= Mizuno Tadashige =

Japanese retainer

- 水野 忠重
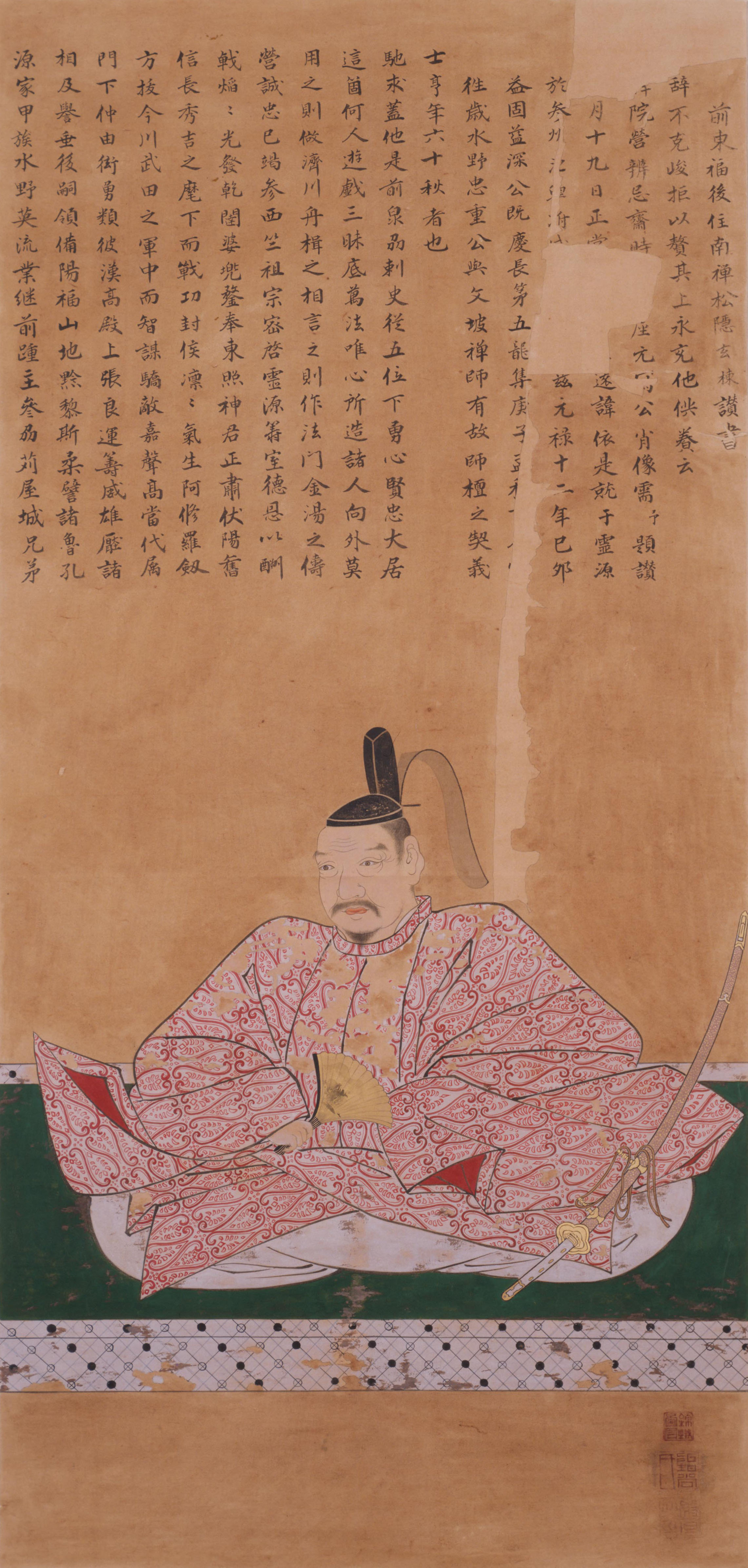

Lord of Kariya
- In office 1576–1600
- Preceded by: Mizuno Nobumoto
- Succeeded by: Mizuno Katsushige

Personal details
- Born: 1541
- Died: 27 August 1600 (aged 58–59) Chiryu, Mikawa Province
- Relations: Mizuno Tadamasa (father); Kayoin (adopted daughter of Okawachi Mototsuna); Mizuno Nobumoto (brother)

Military service
- Allegiance: Tokugawa clan Oda clan
- Unit: Mizuno clan
- Commands: Kariya Castle
- Battles/wars: Battle of Ukino (1558); Battle of Azukizaka (1564); Battle of Anegawa (1570); Siege of Odani Castle (1573); Battle of Mikatagahara (1573); Siege of Takatenjin (1581); Battle of Komaki and Nagakute (1584); Kyūshū Campaign (1586); Siege of Odawara (1590)

Mizuno Tadashige (水野 忠重; 1541 – 17 August 1600) was a vassal of the Oda clan and later the Tokugawa clan following the later years of the Azuchi-Momoyama period of the 16th century.

== Biography ==
Mizuno Tadashige was the son of Mizuno Tadamasa and the brother of Mizuno Nobumoto. His first name was Tadakatsu.

In 1558, Tadashige participated in the Battle of Ukino under the Oda clan in Owari. He was the first to clash with his enemy, breaking through with his spear, and then handed the head over to his brother, Tadatsugu, who took it. When Nobunaga heard this, he was impressed that it was a better deed than taking the head himself.

=== Became Tokugawa clan vassal ===
In 1561, Tadashige became a subordinate of Matsudaira Motoyasu (also known as Tokugawa Ieyasu) at Okazaki Castle in Mikawa. Although the Oda and Matsudaira clans formed an alliance in the spring of the same year through the Kiyosu Alliance , Nobumoto consistently belonged to Nobunaga, and it is believed only around this time Tadashige left Nobumoto and joined Motoyasu. The Honcho Tsugan states that this was due to sibling discord, and the Kansei chofu also states that he was living in seclusion in Washizuka, Mikawa Province, due to discord with his brother.

From 1563, He distinguished himself in the suppression of the Mikawa Ikkō-ikki uprising to the following year. He fought tirelessly, rescuing Sakai Masachika from Nishio Castle and killing the rebel leader Baba Heitayu. He also fought against the rebel leader Hachiya Sadatsugu in the Battle of Kamiwada Castle, but managed to escape. In 1564, he killed the rebel general Ishikawa Shinshichiro at Hosonawe in Anjo during the battle of Azukizaka.

In 1570, Tadashige fought in the Siege of Odani Castle and the Battle of Anegawa, where he distinguished himself in battle.

In 1573, Tadashige participated in the Battle of Mikatagahara against Takeda Shingen. He later rewarded with a head-shaped black lacquered helmet, a motif of the Buddha, and a navy blue armor. According to the Kansei Jushu record, this reward from his Ieyasu was for his deed to serve as Ieyasu's Kagemusha during the battle.

At some points after the battle of Mikatagahara, Ieyasu tried to capture Inui Castle in Tōtōmi Province, but strong resistance from its garrison commander, Amano Kagehira, forced Ieyasu to abort the siege. During their retreat, Kagehira launched a counterattack to pursue Ieyasu, but this was repelled by Tadashige and Torii Mototada, who led the rearguard.

In 1574, Ieyasu attacked Inui Castle in Totomi Province, but was unable to take it. When he retreated, he was attacked by Amano Kagetsura, but Tadashige and Okubo Tadayo served as the rear guard and returned safely.

In 1575, when Takeda Katsuyori attacked Yoshida Castle in Mikawa, Tadashige was defending the castle, but when he went out to fight, he was hit by a bullet in his right shoulder and injured. The bullet was stuck in his flesh and he continued to command with a spear in his left hand. However, because of this injury, he was unable to participate in the next battle of Nagashino.

In the same year, Nobumoto was suspected of colluding with the Takeda clan (for selling military rice to Akiyama Nobutomo of Iwamura Castle in Mino Province ) and fled to Okazaki, but Ieyasu, under Nobunaga's orders, made Nobumoto and his son commit suicide. The Kansei Jushu Shokafu states that this was a slanderous accusation by Sakuma Nobumori, However, this speculation arose from the fact that Nobumoto's Kariya Castle was given to Nobumori.

For about three years from 1579 until 1581, Ieyasu repeatedly besieged Takatenjin Castle against the Takeda clan. Tadashige patticipated each time and Tadashige led reinforcement troops from the Oda clan and was often credited with military success.

In August 1580, when Sakuma Nobumori was expelled from the Oda clan and Kariya Castle in Mikawa was confiscated, Tadashige was given Kariya Castle by Nobunaga and entered the castle on September 23. When Nobumoto's false accusation was revealed, Nobunaga repented and invited Tadashige to succeed as head of the Mizuno clan. Tadashige became Nobunaga's direct vassal and is presumed to have been incorporated into Oda Nobutada's army.

On January 4, 1581, Tadashige was ordered by Nobutada to be sent to guard Yokosuka Castle together with his relative Mizuno Moritaka . After this, he participated in Ieyasu's Siege of Takatenjin (1581) Castle and frequently reported to Nobunaga. On January 25, he received detailed instructions from Nobunaga. In this letter addressed to Mizuno Tadashige, Oda Nobunaga wrote, "It seems that Takatenjin Castle has offered to surrender and open the castle. Accepting this offer would certainly allow us to capture the castle more quickly, and continuing the siege would be extremely difficult. However, Katsuyori is currently in no position to send reinforcements to Takatenjin. If Katsuyori were to refuse reinforcements and the castle were to be destroyed, his prestige would be greatly damaged. I also intend to attack the Takeda clan within the next year or two. Therefore, please inform Ieyasu to carefully consider which course of action is more advantageous. However, since I will not be present at the scene and cannot assess the difficulties Ieyasu and his soldiers will face, please consult with the senior retainers of the Tokugawa household before making a decision." Tadashige is believed to have been assigned to Tokugawa as an inspector or military inspector of the siege forces. The Mizuno clan Genealogy and the Kansei Shoshu Shokafu records stated that during the siege of Takatenjin Castle, Tadashige and his son Katsunari charged into the Ninomaru bailey and fought bravely when the castle fell in March.

In February 1582, Tadashige participated in Nobutada's campaign the Kōshū region against the Takeda clan. After the fall of the Takeda clan, he hosted Nobunaga, who just returned from the conquest, in Mikawa. In June of the same year, when the Honnoji Incident occurred, Tadashige qqs believed to have accompanied Oda Nobutada to Myōkaku-ji Temple and Nijō Onshinzō, but escaped and went into hiding in Kyoto. He escaped and returned to Kariya, Mikawa Province on June 11.army.

=== Battle of Komaki Nagakute ===
On March 10 1584, Toyotomi Hideyoshi invited Mizuno Tadashige, Niwa Ujitsugu, and Takagi Sadatomo, who were on Oda Nobukatsu's faction, to join him as vassals, but they did not accept. That same month, Tadashige served on Nobukatsu side in the Battle of Komaki.

On the 13th, his son Katsunari was ordered to rescue Kobe Castle in Ise. Tadashige attacked the refuge of Okada Yoshitada, the younger brother of Okada Shigetaka (who was executed by Nobukatsu), forcing him to surrender and capturing it. Later, Tadashige participated in the battle of Komaki and Nagakute against Hideyoshi. On April 8, he led the vanguard of the Oda-Tokugawa allied forces, along with Okanaga Nagamori, Osuka Yasutaka, Sakakibara Yasumasa, Honda Hirotaka, and Niwa Ujitsugu. At a military council held at Obata Castle, Tadashige proposed a strategy to avoid the enemy's main force and rather attacking the Toyotomi army's rear. Sakakibara and other generals agreed and commence Tadashige's plan. The next morning, they attacked Miyoshi Hidetsugu's main camp and routed him. In this engagement, Tadashige's family member, Mizuno Buncho, reportedly manage to Kill enemy general Kinoshita Toshimasa. Tadashige berated his son Katsunari for not wearing helmet in battle, while Katsunari argues that he had ailment on his eyes which forcing him to bandage his head and preventing him to wear helmet. (Note: According to Mizuno Katsunari memorandum, he was regarded as "Mizuno Tojuro" here.)

Later, during the main battle at Nagakute, his son Katsunari shared the glory of the victory with Ii Naomasa. However, Mizuno Tadayoshi rather annoyed with his son's conduct of disobeying the central command and took the initiative independently by attacking the enemy before being commanded, thus prompting Tadayoshi to further criticize Katsunari.

In June, he also fought alongside Niwa Ujitsugu at the Battle of Kanie Castle.

In October, Hideyoshi besieged Kuwana Castle, where Oda Nobukatsu was holed up, but Tadashige and his men held out and repelled the attack. During the battle at Kuwana, Tadashige's eldest son, Katsunari, killed Tadashige's vassal, Tominaga Hanbei, claiming that his father had punished him for slander. Tadashige, hearing his father's explanation in Komaki, did not forgive him and banished him.

On November 15, Nobukatsu made a separate peace with Hideyoshi and became his vassal, so Tadashige became a subordinate vassal. In February 1585, when Hideyoshi raised an army to attack Saiga , Nobukatsu ordered him to march on the 12th of the same month. Although the exact date is unclear, it appears that Tadashige became Hideyoshi's direct vassal around this time. In September, Hideyoshi granted him an additional 728 koku of land in Kanda, Toshima County, Settsu Province.

=== Later life and death ===
In 1586, Tadashige participated in the Kyūshū Campaign. On July 29 of the same year, he was appointed Izumi no Kami with the rank of Junior Fifth Rank and given the surname Toyotomi.

In the Siege of Odawara (1590), Tadashige led 250 cavalry. On September 4 of the same year, he was transferred to Kobe Castle in Ise with a fief of 40,000 koku.

In 1592, during the Imjin War, the Matsuura Kojiki records that Mizuno Izuminokami was among the guards stationed at Nagoya Castle in Hizen.

In 1600, he was killed by Kaganoi Shigemochi on August 27 at Chiryu, Mikawa Province, a few days before the Battle of Sekigahara.

== Bibliography ==
- Kusudo Yoshiaki (2009). 戦国名将・智将・梟将の至言. 学研M文庫. 学習研究社. p. 14. ISBN 978-4-05-901239-9.
