= Sieges of Takatenjin =

Takatenjin Castle (高天神城, Takatenjin-jō), in the south of Japan's old Tōtōmi Province, came under siege twice in the 16th century.

- Siege of Takatenjin (1574), Ogasawara Nagatada, a vassal of the Tokugawa, lost the fortress to Takeda Katsuyori
- Siege of Takatenjin (1581), the Takeda lost the fortress to Oda Nobunaga
