= Siege of Takatenjin =

Siege of Takatenjin may refer to:

- Siege of Takatenjin (1574), 1574 siege of Takatenjin fortress, Tōtōmi Province, Japan
- Siege of Takatenjin (1581), 1581 siege of Takatenjin fortress, Tōtōmi Province, Japan
