= Battle of Takatenjin =

1574 Japanese battle between Tokugawa Ieyasu and Takeda Katsuyori

Coordinates: 34.6983°N 138.0347°E

The Battle of Takatenjin (高天神の戦い) was fought in 1574 between the forces of Tokugawa Ieyasu and the forces of Takeda Katsuyori.

Katsuyori captured the Tokugawa fortress of Takatenjin, a feat which his father had unsuccessfully attempted. This attack was also displayed in the Akira Kurosawa film Kagemusha.

== See also ==
- Siege of Takatenjin (1574)
