= List of Nintama Rantarō episodes =

This is a list of the episodes from the anime series Nintama Rantarō based on the manga series, Rakudai Ninja Rantarō, written and illustrated by Sōbē Amako. The anime is produced by Ajia-do Animation Works and is directed by Tsutomu Shibayama. The series has been broadcast on NHK since April 10, 1993.

There are currently twenty five seasons (or story phases), each composed of many episodes. Below are the seasons and the number of episodes, as found on the official Japanese site. There are over 2,000 total episodes, with more in production.

== Episode list ==
=== Season 1 (1993-94) ===
No.	Title	Original release date
1	"Ninjutsu Academy Matriculation"; Transliteration: "Ninjutsu Gakuen Nyūgaku no Dan" (Japanese: 忍術学園入学の段)	10 April 1993
1	"Kunoichi Class Is Horrible"; Transliteration: "Kunoichi Kyōshitsu wa Osoroshii no Dan" (Japanese: くノ一教室はおそろしいの段)	10 April 1993
2	"Weird Ninja"; Transliteration: "Hen na Ninja no Dan" (Japanese: 変な忍者の段)	17 April 1993
2	"Memories of the Headmaster"; Transliteration: "Gakuenchō no Omoi Tsuki" (Japanese: 学園長の思いつきの段)	17 April 1993
3	"Shinbē Disappeared"; Transliteration: "Kieta Shinbē no Dan" (Japanese: 消えたしんべヱの段)	24 April 1993
3	"The Mysterious Delivery Ninja"; Transliteration: "Nazo no Bunshin Ninja no Dan" (Japanese: 謎の分身忍者の段)	24 April 1993
4	"Happy Golden Week"; Transliteration: "Tanoshii Gōrudan Uīku no Dan" (Japanese: 楽しいゴールデンウィークの段)	1 May 1993
4	"Shinbē Is Suspected"; Transliteration: "Shinbē Utagawareru no Dan" (Japanese: しんべヱ疑われるの段)	1 May 1993
5	"Master Fencer Makinosuke Hanabusa"; Transliteration: "Kengō Hanabusa Makinosuke no Dan" (Japanese: 剣豪・花房牧之介の段)	8 May 1993
5	"Who's the Most Amazing?"; Transliteration: "Ichiban Erai no wa Dare no Dan" (Japanese: 一番偉いのは誰の段)	8 May 1993
6	"Even Sneaking into Kunoichi Class"; Transliteration: "Kunoichi Kyōshitsu ni Sennyū Seyo no Dan" (Japanese: くノ一教室に潜入せよの段)	15 May 1993
6	"Shinbē's Disappeared"; Transliteration: "Shinbē ga Inai no Dan" (Japanese: しんべヱがいないの段)	15 May 1993
7	"Sneaky Genius"; Transliteration: "Shinobi no Tensai no Dan" (Japanese: 忍びの天才の段)	22 May 1993
7	"Eliminating the Thief"; Transliteration: "Dōzoku Taiji no Dan" (Japanese: 盗賊退治の段)	22 May 1993
8	"Martial Arts Tournament"; Transliteration: "Budō Taikai no Dan" (Japanese: 武道大会の段)	29 May 1993
8	"Heartwarming Camaraderie"; Transliteration: "Uruwashiki Jōkei no Dan" (Japanese: 麗しき友情の段)	29 May 1993
9	"Covert Courier Shinkurō"; Transliteration: "Misshi Shinkurō no Dan" (Japanese: 密使・新九郎の段)	5 June 1993
9	"Hustle to Nameko Castle"; Transliteration: "Nameko-jō e Hashire no Dan" (Japanese: ナメコ城へ走れの段)	5 June 1993
10	"The Pirate Who Couldn't Swim"; Transliteration: "Oyogenai Kaizoku no Dan" (Japanese: 泳げない海賊の段)	12 June 1993
10	"Love Sickness"; Transliteration: "Koi no Byō no Dan" (Japanese: 恋の病の段)	12 June 1993
11	"Aiming for Yamada-sensei"; Transliteration: "Yamada-sensei Nerawareru no Dan" (Japanese: 山田先生狙われるの段)	19 June 1993
11	"Combined Studies"; Transliteration: "Gōdō Jugyō no Dan" (Japanese: 合同授業の段)	19 June 1993
12	"Practice Traversing Kinokoyama"; Transliteration: "Kinokoyama Jūdan Kunren no Dan" (Japanese: キノコ山縦断訓練の段)	26 June 1993
12	"Master Fencer Makinosuke Hanabusa, Part II"; Transliteration: "Futatabi Kengō Hanabusa Makinosuke no Dan" (Japanese: 再び剣豪・花房牧之介の段)	26 June 1993
13	"Dad's Enemy"; Transliteration: "Chichi no Teki no Dan" (Japanese: 父の敵の段)	3 July 1993
13	"Summer Vacation's Over"; Transliteration: "Natsumi Yasumi ga Nakunaru no Dan" (Japanese: 夏休みがなくなるの段)	3 July 1993
14	"The Principal's Wall Scroll"; Transliteration: "Gakuenchō no Kakejiku no Dan" (Japanese: 学園長の掛け軸の段)	10 July 1993
14	"Revelation from God"; Transliteration: "Kamisama no Otsuge no Dan" (Japanese: 神様のお告げの段)	10 July 1993
15	"The Master of Maitake Castle"; Transliteration: "Maitake-jō no Dono no Dan" (Japanese: マイタケ城の殿の段)	17 July 1993
15	"Steal the Food!"; Transliteration: "Shokuryō o Ubae! no Dan" (Japanese: 食糧を奪え！の段)	17 July 1993
16	"The Boat of Kyōeimaru III"; Transliteration: "Daisan Kyōeimaru no Fune no Dan" (Japanese: 第三協栄丸の船の段)	24 July 1993
16	"Freezing Total Purification"; Transliteration: "Hieta Happō Imi no Dan" (Japanese: ひえた八方斎の段)	24 July 1993
17	"Shinbē's Apology"; Transliteration: "Shinbē no Gomen no Dan" (Japanese: しんべヱのごめんの段)	31 July 1993
17	"A Colorful Autumn"; Transliteration: "Iroiro na Aki no Dan" (Japanese: いろいろな秋の段)	31 July 1993
18	"Worried People"; Transliteration: "Nayameru Hitobito no Dan" (Japanese: 悩める人々の段)	7 August 1993
18	"The Legendary Sword Gokurakumaru"; Transliteration: "Meitō Gokurakumaru no dan" (Japanese: 名刀極楽丸の段)	7 August 1993
19	"The Disappearing Rice Bowl"; Transliteration: "Kieta Chawan no Dan" (Japanese: 消えた茶わんの段)	14 August 1993
19	"The Residence of Shinde Mohashirō"; Transliteration: "Shinde Mohashirō no Yashiki no Dan" (Japanese: 新出茂橋郎の屋敷の段)	14 August 1993
20	"The Amazing Younger Brother"; Transliteration: "Sugureta Oto no Dan" (Japanese: すぐれた弟の段)	21 August 1993
20	"The Phantom Matsutake"; Transliteration: "Maboroshi no Matsutake no Dan" (Japanese: 幻のマツタケの段)	21 August 1993
21	"Summer Vacation Fool"; Transliteration: "Natsuyasumi Boke no Dan" (Japanese: 夏休みボケの段)	28 August 1993
21	"The Rumoured Transfer Student"; Transliteration: "Uwasa no Tenkōsei no Dan" (Japanese: 噂の転校生の段)	28 August 1993
22	"Tensaimaru and Shūsaimaru"; Transliteration: "Tensaimaru to Shūsaimaru no Dan" (Japanese: 天才丸と秀才丸の段)	4 September 1993
22	"A Piercing Autumn Wind"; Transliteration: "Akikaze ga Minishimeru no Dan" (Japanese: 秋風が身にしみるの段)	4 September 1993
23	"Junko and Junichi"; Transliteration: "Junko to Junichi no Dan" (Japanese: ジュンコとジュンイチの段)	11 September 1993
23	"Fast as the Wind, Quiet as the Forest, Daring as Fire, Immovable as the Mountain (Note: This is a reference to Fūrinkazan, a quote from The Art of War by Sun Tzu.)"; Transliteration: "Fūrinkazan no Dan" (Japanese: 風林火山の段)	11 September 1993
24	"The Treasure Jar"; Transliteration: "Takara no Tsubo no Dan" (Japanese: 宝のツボの段)	18 September 1993
24	"Dokechi Failure"; Transliteration: "Dokechi Shippai no Dan" (Japanese: ドケチ失敗の段)	18 September 1993
25	"Ninja Assistance"; Transliteration: "Nintama Sukedachi no Dan" (Japanese: 忍たま助太刀の段)	25 September 1993
25	"The Headmaster's Red Bean Soup"; Transliteration: "Gakuenchō no Oshiruko no Dan" (Japanese: 学園長のお汁粉の段)	25 September 1993
26	"The Treacherous Trip"; Transliteration: "Kiken na Ensoku no Dan" (Japanese: 危険な遠足の段)	2 October 1993
26	"Bandit Brothers"; Transliteration: "Sanzoku Kyōdai no Dan" (Japanese: 山賊兄弟の段)	2 October 1993
27	"Nervous Ninja"; Transliteration: "Uchiki na Ninja no Dan" (Japanese: 内気な忍者の段)	9 October 1993
27	"Nettled Ninja"; Transliteration: "Iraira Ninja no Dan" (Japanese: イライラ忍者の段)	9 October 1993
28	"No Ordinary Dokechi"; Transliteration: "Tada no Dokechi Janai no Dan" (Japanese: ただのドケチじゃないの段)	16 October 1993
28	"The Headmaster's Straw Doll"; Transliteration: "Gakuenchō no Waraningyō no Dan" (Japanese: 学園長のワラ人形の段)	16 October 1993
29	"The First Year's Must Protect the Group!"; Transliteration: "Ichinen wa Kumi o Mamore! no Dan" (Japanese: 一年は組を守れ！の段)	23 October 1993
29	"The Troubled Kirimaru"; Transliteration: "Komatta Kirimaru no Dan" (Japanese: 困ったきり丸の段)	23 October 1993
30	"The Stolen Nameplate"; Transliteration: "Nusumareta Hyōsatsu no Dan" (Japanese: 盗まれた表札の段)	30 October 1993
30	"The Secret of the Nameplate"; Transliteration: "Hyōsatsu no Himitsu no Dan" (Japanese: 表札の秘密の段)	30 October 1993
31	"And the Princess...?"; Transliteration: "Ohime-sama no wa? no Dan" (Japanese: お姫さまは？の段)	30 October 1993
31	"Bandit Part-timer"; Transliteration: "Sanzoku Arubaito no Dan" (Japanese: 山賊アルバイトの段)	30 October 1993
32	"Burnt Bread Warehouse"; Transliteration: "Kurokoge Pankura no Dan" (Japanese: 黒こげパン蔵の段)	6 November 1993
32	"Tatami Scraps"; Transliteration: "Tatami no Kirehashi no Dan" (Japanese: たたみの切れはしの段)	6 November 1993
33	"Mom's Coming to School"; Transliteration: "Kaa-chan Gakuen ni Kiru no Dan" (Japanese: 母ちゃん学園に来るの段)	13 November 1993
33	"Dad's Promoted"; Transliteration: "Tō-chan Shussesuru no Dan" (Japanese: 父ちゃん出世するの段)	13 November 1993
34	"The Poison Under the Floor"; Transliteration: "Yakushita no Dokuyaku no Dan" (Japanese: 床下の毒薬の段)	20 November 1993
34	"Kiri-chan Blunders"; Transliteration: "Kiri-chan Shippai no Dan" (Japanese: きりちゃん失敗の段)	20 November 1993
35	"Shuriken Contest"; Transliteration: "Shuriken Konkũru no Dan" (Japanese: 手裏剣コンクールの段)	27 November 1993
35	"The Awesome Menu"; Transliteration: "Moeru Menyũ no Dan" (Japanese: 燃えるメニューの段)	27 November 1993
36	"It's Fool's Gold!"; Transliteration: "Nisekin Da! no Dan" (Japanese: ニセ金だ！の段)	4 December 1993
36	"Who's the Culprit?"; Transliteration: "Hannin wa Dare? no Dan" (Japanese: 犯人は誰？の段)	4 December 1993
37	"Kiri-chan's Part-time Job"; Transliteration: "Kiri-chan Arubaito no Dan" (Japanese: きりちゃんアルバイトの段)	11 December 1993
37	"Kiri-chan Is a Dokechi"; Transliteration: "Kiri-chan Dokechi no Dan" (Japanese: きりちゃんドケチの段)	11 December 1993
38	"Shinbē is Stroooong"; Transliteration: "Tsuyō Shinbē no Dan" (Japanese: ツヨーイしんべヱの段)	18 December 1993
38	"Washout Ninja"; Transliteration: "Rakudai Ninja no Dan" (Japanese: 落第忍者の段)	18 December 1993
38	"Who's the Best?"; Transliteration: "Ichiban Erai no wa? no Dan" (Japanese: 一番えらいのは？の段)	18 December 1993
39	"The Stolen Pole"; Transliteration: "Nusumareta Teppō no Dan" (Japanese: 盗まれた鉄砲の段)	25 December 1993
39	"Showdown at Dokutake Castle!"; Transliteration: "Taiketsu! Dokutake-jō no Dan" (Japanese: 対決！ドクタケ城の段)	25 December 1993
40	"Supplementary Ninja Exam"; Transliteration: "Nintama Tsuishi no Dan" (Japanese: 忍たま追試の段)	15 January 1994
40	"Goldfish Jealousy!"; Transliteration: "Kingyo Yāi! no Dan" (Japanese: 金魚やーい！の段)	15 January 1994
41	"The Dining Hall Has Been Stolen!"; Transliteration: "Shokudō Torareta! no Dan" (Japanese: 食堂取られた！の段)	22 January 1994
41	"It's an Onsen!"; Transliteration: "Onsen Daa! no Dan" (Japanese: 温泉だあ！の段)	22 January 1994
42	"Hemuhemu Is Gone!"; Transliteration: "Hemuhemu ga Inai! no Dan" (Japanese: ヘムヘムがいない！の段)	29 January 1994
42	"Give Back Hemuhemu!"; Transliteration: "Hemuhemu o Kaese! no Dan" (Japanese: ヘムヘムを返せ！の段)	29 January 1994
43	"To the Sausage!"; Transliteration: "Sōsēji e! no Dan" (Japanese: ソーセージへ！の段)	5 February 1994
43	"Victory to the Second Years!"; Transliteration: "Ninensei ni Katsu! no Dan" (Japanese: 二年生に勝つ！の段)	5 February 1994
44	"The Insanely Strong Band of Thieves"; Transliteration: "Mechatsuyoi Dōzokudan no Dan" (Japanese: メチャ強い盗賊団の段)	12 February 1994
44	"Search for the Weakness!"; Transliteration: "Jakuten o Sagase! no Dan" (Japanese: 弱点をさがせ！の段)	12 February 1994
45	"I'm Stuffed!"; Transliteration: "Onaka ga Ippai! no Dan" (Japanese: おなかがイッパイ！の段)	19 February 1994
45	"The Heart Becomes Fierce!"; Transliteration: "Kokoro o Oni ni! no Dan" (Japanese: 心を鬼に！の段)	19 February 1994
46	"Granny Catches a Cold!"; Transliteration: "Obachan Kaze o Hiku! no Dan" (Japanese: おばちゃん風邪をひく！の段)	12 March 1994
46	"Kirimaru Makes a Killing"; Transliteration: "Kirimaru Õmōke no Dan" (Japanese: きり丸大モウケの段)	12 March 1994
47	"I Want to Become a Teacher"; Transliteration: "Sensei ni Naritai no Dan" (Japanese: 先生になりたいの段)	19 March 1994
47	"A Beautiful Sunrise"; Transliteration: "Utsukushii Hinode no Dan" (Japanese: 美しい日の出の段)	19 March 1994

=== Season 2 (1994-95) ===
No. overall	No. in season	Title	Original release date
48	1	"Ninja with a baby" Transliteration: "Komochi Ninja no Dan" (Japanese: 子持ち忍者の段)	3 October 1994
49	2	"I want a nap" Transliteration: "Hirune o Shitai no Dan" (Japanese: 昼寝をしたいの段)	4 October 1994
50	3	"The Mysterious moneychanger" Transliteration: "Nazo no Ryōgaeya no Dan" (Japanese: 謎の両替屋の段)	5 October 1994
51	4	"Class president is awesome" Transliteration: "Gakkyū Iinchō wa Erai no Dan" (Japanese: 学級委員長は偉いの段)	6 October 1994
52	5	"Shina Yamamoto-sensei's true identity" Transliteration: "Yamamoto Shina-sensei no Shōtai no Dan" (Japanese: 山本シナ先生の正体の段)	7 October 1994
53	6	"Super-class ninja" Transliteration: "Chōichiryū no Ninja no Dan" (Japanese: 超一流の忍者の段)	10 October 1994
54	7	"Who's the sharp-eyed one?" Transliteration: "Surudoi Me wa Dare Da? no Dan" (Japanese: 鋭い目は誰だ？の段)	11 October 1994
55	8	"Lucky Ninja"; Transliteration: "Tsuiteru Ninja no Dan" (Japanese: ツイてる忍者の段)	12 October 1994
56	9	"Hanabusa Makinosuke is never deterred" Transliteration: "Korinai Hanabusa Makinosuke no Dan" (Japanese: こりない花房牧之介の段)	13 October 1994
57	10	"Don't lose to the kunoichi" Transliteration: "Kunoichi ni Makeruna no Dan" (Japanese: くノ一に負けるなの段)	14 October 1994
58	11	"Follow-up lessons" Transliteration: "Hoshūjugyō no Dan" (Japanese: 補習授業の段)	17 October 1994
59	12	"What I taught" Transliteration: "Ore ga Oshieta no Dan" (Japanese: 俺が教えたの段)	18 October 1994
60	13	"It's the face that counts for a ninja" Transliteration: "Ninja wa Kao no Dan" (Japanese: 忍者は顔の段)	19 October 1994
61	14	"I love slimy" Transliteration: "Nurunur Daisuki no Dan" (Japanese: ヌルヌル大好きの段)	20 October 1994
62	15	"Kirimaru's test" Transliteration: "Kirimaru no Tesuto no Dan" (Japanese: きり丸のテストの段)	21 October 1994
63	16	"Wild weed salad" Transliteration: "Nogusa Sarada no Dan" (Japanese: 野草サラダの段)	24 October 1994
64	17	"Mount Uraura's co-op vice-president" Transliteration: "Uraura-yama no Fukukumiaichō no Dan" (Japanese: 裏々山の副組合長の段)	25 October 1994
65	18	"The all-there-is mushroom, is-that-all-there-is mushroom" Transliteration: "Arittake Korettake no Dan" (Japanese: ありっ茸これっ茸の段)	26 October 1994
66	19	"Principal runs away from home" Transliteration: "Gakuenchō no Iede no Dan" (Japanese: 学園長の家出の段)	27 October 1994
67	20	"The maiden's heart" Transliteration: "Otomegokoro no Dan" (Japanese: おとめ心の段)	28 October 1994
68	21	"Anniversary of the school's founding" Transliteration: "Kaikōkinenbi no Dan" (Japanese: 開校記念日の段)	30 October 1994
69	22	"Inside of the Jar"; Transliteration: "Tsubo no Nakami no Dan" (Japanese: 壷の中身の段)	1 November 1994
70	23	"Who's the culprit?" Transliteration: "Hannin wa Dare? no Dan" (Japanese: 犯人は誰？の段)	2 November 1994
71	24	"Changing jobs" Transliteration: "Tenshoku no Dan" (Japanese: 転職の段)	3 November 1994
72	25	"The Diary gone missing" Transliteration: "Nakunatta Nikki no Dan" (Japanese: なくなった日記の段)	4 November 1994
73	26	"The Mysterious sutra mound" Transliteration: "Nazo no Kyōzuka no Dan" (Japanese: 謎の経塚の段)	7 November 1994
74	27	"300-year-old ancestor" Transliteration: "Sambyakunen Mae no Senzo no Dan" (Japanese: 三百年前の先祖の段)	8 November 1994
75	28	"Yamada-sensei gets angry" Transliteration: "Yamada-sensei Okoru no Dan" (Japanese: 山田先生怒るの段)	9 November 1994
76	29	"I Love Disguises!"; Transliteration: "Hensō Daisuki no Dan" (Japanese: 変装大好きの段)	10 November 1994
77	30	"The Do-or-die diet" Transliteration: "Kesshi no Daietto no Dan" (Japanese: 決死のダイエットの段)	11 November 1994
78	31	"Bandit's Lost Goods"; Transliteration: "Sanzoku no Otoshimono no Dan" (Japanese: 山賊の落とし物の段)	14 November 1994
79	32	"Kōchamaru and the Cookie"; Transliteration: "Kōchamaru to Kukkii no Dan" (Japanese: 高茶丸とクッキー太郎の段)	15 November 1994
80	33	"The Kakuzatō band" Transliteration: "Kakuzatō no Dan" (Japanese: 各座党の段)	16 November 1994
81	34	"Shadō-Sensei"; Transliteration: "Shadō-sensei no Dan" (Japanese: 斜堂先生の段)	17 November 1994
82	35	"Frequent Challenger Makinosuke!"; Transliteration: "Saisai Chōsen! Makinosuke no Dan" (Japanese: 再々挑戦！牧之介の段)	18 November 1994
83	36	"Beware of fire (Note: Hi no yōjin (火の用心, "Beware of fire") is the stock phrase shouted by people on fire patrol at night.)" Transliteration: "Hi no Yōjin no Dan" (Japanese: 火の用心の段)	21 November 1994
84	37	"Fraid of fire" Transliteration: "Hi ga Kowai no Dan" (Japanese: 火が怖いの段)	22 November 1994
85	38	"Fire! Fire!"; Transliteration: "Kaji daa! no Dan" (Japanese: 火事だあ！の段)	23 November 1994
86	39	"Not ninja material" Transliteration: "Ninja ni Mukanai no Dan" (Japanese: 忍者にむかないの段)	24 November 1994
87	40	"Overcome stage fright!" Transliteration: "Agari shō o Naose! no Dan" (Japanese: 上がり性をなおせ！の段)	25 November 1994
88	41	"Danzō is gone" Transliteration: "Danzou ga Inai no Dan" (Japanese: 団蔵がいないの段)	28 November 1994
89	42	"Danzō's daddy" Transliteration: "Danzō no Tōchan no Dan" (Japanese: 団蔵の父ちゃんの段)	29 November 1994
90	43	"Yokoyari Irejūrō"; Transliteration: "Yokoyari Nyuu Jūrō" (Japanese: 横槍入十郎の段)	30 November 1994
91	44	"Shinbē's papa is here" Transliteration: "Shinbē no Papa ga Kita no Dan" (Japanese: しんべヱのパパが来たの段)	1 December 1994
92	45	"Pursue the ice thief" Transliteration: "Kōri dorobō o Oe no Dan" (Japanese: 氷泥棒を追えの段)	2 December 1994
93	46	"Password loathing" Transliteration: "Aikotoba nanka Daikirai no Dan" (Japanese: 合い言葉なんか大嫌いの段)	5 December 1994
94	47	"Happōsai's aim" Transliteration: "Happōsai no Nerai no Dan" (Japanese: 八方斎の狙いの段)	6 December 1994
95	48	"Kirimaru imperiled" Transliteration: "Kiri-chan Ayaushi no Dan" (Japanese: きりちゃん危うしの段)	7 December 1994
96	49	"Takiyashamaru-senpai"; Transliteration: "Takiyashamaru Senpai no Dan" (Japanese: 滝夜叉丸先輩の段)	8 December 1994
97	50	"Very Accurate Fortune-Telling"; Transliteration: "Yoku Ataru Uranai no Dan" (Japanese: よく当たる占いの段)	9 December 1994
98	51	"Man with the Bad Shave"; Transliteration: "Higezori ga Heta na Otoko no Dan" (Japanese: ヒゲ剃りが下手な男の段)	12 December 1994
99	52	"First-Year vs. Second-Year"; Transliteration: "Ichinensei Tai Ninensei no Dan" (Japanese: 一年生対二年生の段)	13 December 1994
100	53	"The Fight Against Weakness"; Transliteration: "Nigate to Tatakae no Dan" (Japanese: 苦手と戦えの段)	14 December 1994
101	54	"Shinbei's Cold"; Transliteration: "Shinbei no Kaze no Dan" (Japanese: しんべヱの風邪の段)	15 December 1994
102	55	"A silly fight" Transliteration: "Komatta Kenka no Dan" (Japanese: 困った喧嘩の段)	16 December 1994
103	56	"Daisankyōei-maru's New Year's gift" Transliteration: "Daisankyōeimaru no Oseibo no Dan" (Japanese: 第三協栄丸のお歳暮の段)	19 December 1994
104	57	"Mysterious accident" Transliteration: "Nazo no jiko no dan" (Japanese: 謎の事故の段)	20 December 1994
105	58	"The Sad bandit" Transliteration: "Kanashiki sanzoku no dan" (Japanese: 哀しき山賊の段)	21 December 1994
106	59	"Top secret memo" Transliteration: "Maruhi memo no dan" (Japanese: マル秘メモの段)	22 December 1994
107	60	"New teacher" Transliteration: "Atarashii sensei" (Japanese: 新しい先生の段)	23 December 1994
108	61	"Grand year-end house-cleaning" Transliteration: "Ōsoji no dan" (Japanese: 大掃除の段)	26 December 1994
109	62	"Winter break" Transliteration: "Fuyuyasumi no dan" (Japanese: 冬休みの段)	27 December 1994
110	63	"The real ninjutsu" Transliteration: "Honto no ninjutsu no dan" (Japanese: ホントの忍術の段)	28 December 1994
111	64	"Mochi-pounding"; Transliteration: "Mochitsuki no dan" (Japanese: もちつきの段)	29 December 1994
112	65	"Ishikawa Gojūemon"; Transliteration: "Ishikawa Gojūemon no dan" (Japanese: 石川五十ヱ門の段)	30 December 1994
113	66	"Kite-flying tournament" Transliteration: "Takoage taikai no dan" (Japanese: 凧上げ大会の段)	4 January 1995
114	67	"Can't go home" Transliteration: "Kaerenai no dan" (Japanese: 帰れないの段)	5 January 1995
115	68	"Yummy boiled octopus" Transliteration: "Oishii yudedako no dan" (Japanese: おいしい茹でダコの段)	6 January 1995
116	69	"It's New Year's and already at it?" Transliteration: "Oshōgatsu sōsō no dan" (Japanese: お正月そうそうの段)	9 January 1995
117	70	"Takeuma master" Transliteration: "Takeuma meijin no dan" (Japanese: 竹馬名人の段)	10 January 1995
118	71	"Ninjutsu whiz-girl" Transliteration: "Tensai ninja shōjo no dan" (Japanese: 天才忍術少女の段)	11 February 1995
119	72	"Emergency staff meeting" Transliteration: "Kinkyū shokuin kaigi no dan" (Japanese: 緊急職員会議の段)	13 February 1995
120	73	"Collection"; Transliteration: "Korekushon no dan" (Japanese: コレクションの段)	14 February 1995
121	74	"Snow is falling" Transliteration: "Yuki ga furu no dan" (Japanese: 雪が降るの段)	15 February 1995
122	75	"Wrong person" Transliteration: "Hitochigai no dan" (Japanese: 人ちがいの段)	18 February 1995
123	76	"Father's employment" Transliteration: "Chichiue no shūshoku" (Japanese: 父上の就職の段)	19 February 1995
124	77	"Sunrise"; Transliteration: "Hinode no dan" (Japanese: 日の出の段)	25 February 1995
125	78	"Two birds with one stone" Transliteration: "Isseki nichō no dan" (Japanese: 一石二鳥の段)	1 March 1995
126	79	"I just love rakkyō scallions" Transliteration: "Rakkyō daisuki" (Japanese: ラッキョウ大好きの段)	2 March 1995
127	80	"Hurry to Kinrakuji temple" Transliteration: "Kinrakuji e isoge no dan" (Japanese: 金楽寺へ急げの段)	6 March 1995
128	81	"The flight jutsu technique" Transliteration: "Hikō no jutsu no dan" (Japanese: 飛行の術の段)	7 March 1995
129	82	"Scolded"; Transliteration: "Shikararete no dan" (Japanese: 叱られての段)	8 March 1995
130	83	"Shinbē's morning hair" Transliteration: "Shinbē no neguse no dan" (Japanese: しんべヱの寝ぐせの段)	9 March 1995
131	84	"Hemu-Hemu's blunder" Transliteration: "Hemuhemu shippai no dan" (Japanese: ヘムヘム失敗の段)	10 March 1995
132	85	"Hemu-Hemu's barking" Transliteration: "Hemuhemu no nakigoe no dan" (Japanese: ヘムヘムの鳴き声の段)	8 April 1995
133	86	"Ninja's secret scroll" Transliteration: "Ninja hidensho no dan" (Japanese: 忍術秘伝書の段)	9 April 1995
134	87	"Mister bandit's generosity" Transliteration: "Sanzaku san no gokōi no dan" (Japanese: 山賊さんのご好意の段)	13 April 1995
135	88	"Learn the body movement by drill" Transliteration: "Karada de oboeru no dan" (Japanese: 体で覚えるの段)	14 April 1995
136	89	"Matsutake Castle's young lord" Transliteration: "Matsutakejō no wakasama no dan" (Japanese: マツタケ城の若様の段)	19 April 1995
137	90	"Thee are two young lords" Transliteration: "Wakasama ga futari no dan" (Japanese: 若様が二人の段)	20 April 1995
138	91	"Shizukadake"; Transliteration: "Shizukadake no dan" (Japanese: シズカダケの段)	29 April 1995
139	92	"Abominable snowman who can't stand the cold" Transliteration: "Samugari no yukiotoko no dan" (Japanese: 寒がりの雪男の段)	30 April 1995
140	93	"Smiley face is important" Transliteration: "Egao ga daiji no dan" (Japanese: 笑顔が大事の段)	5 May 1995
141	94	"Daisankyōei-maru's nuisance" Transliteration: "Daisankyōeimaru no meiwaku no dan" (Japanese: 第三協栄丸の迷惑の段)	6 May 1995
142	95	"The pirates enemies are who?" Transliteration: "Kaizoku no teki wa? no dan" (Japanese: 海賊の敵は？の段)	20 May 1995
143	96	"Bait for Sazaemon"; Transliteration: "Sazaemon no esa no dan" (Japanese: サザエ門のエサの段)	25 May 1995
144	97	"A flabberghasting challenge" Transliteration: "Akireta chōsen no dan" (Japanese: 呆れた挑戦の段)	26 May 1995
145	98	"Fine and well!" Transliteration: "Genki desu! no dan" (Japanese: 元気です！の段)	1 June 1995
146	99	"Graffiti"; Transliteration: "Itazura gaki no dan" (Japanese: いたずら書きの段)	2 June 1995
147	100	"Happōsai's scheming" Transliteration: "Happōsai no takurami" (Japanese: 八方斎の企みの段)	3 June 1995
148	101	"Happōsai undone" Transliteration: "Komatta Happōsai no dan" (Japanese: 困った八方斎の段)	4 June 1995
149	102	"Toothache"; Transliteration: "Ha ga itai no dan" (Japanese: 歯が痛いの段)	7 June 1995
150	103	"Ninjutsu Academy visiting tour" Transliteration: "Ninjutsu Gakuen kengaku no dan" (Japanese: 忍術学園見学の段)	14 June 1995
151	104	"What about Hatsutake Castle?"; Transliteration: "Hatsutakejō wa? no dan" (Japanese: ハツタケ城は？の段)	21 June 1995
152	105	"A bored samurai lord" Transliteration: "Taikutsu na tonosama no dan" (Japanese: 退屈な殿様の段)	28 June 1995
153	106	"Reverse and opposite" Transliteration: "Abekobe hantai no dan" (Japanese: あべこべ反対の段)	29 June 1995
154	107	"Helpful Buddhist statue" Transliteration: "Arigatai butsuzō no dan" (Japanese: ありがたい仏像の段)	6 July 1995
155	108	"Let's make up" Transliteration: "Nakanaori shitai no dan" (Japanese: 仲直りしたいの段)	13 July 1995
156	109	"Unkokusai the conjurer" Transliteration: "Genjutsu tsukai Unkokusai no dan" (Japanese: 幻術使い雲黒斎の段)	20 July 1995
157	110	"Don't look at the right hand" Transliteration: "Migite o miruna" (Japanese: 右手を見るなの段)	27 July 1995
158	111	"Rikichi's plan" Transliteration: "Rikichi no sakusen no dan" (Japanese: 利吉の作戦の段)	August 3, 1995
159	112	"Pop training drill" Transliteration: "Nukiuchi kunren no dan" (Japanese: 抜き打ち訓練の段)	4 August 1995
160	113	"Kirimaru's secret" Transliteration: "Kirimaru no himitsu no dan" (Japanese: きり丸の秘密の段)	10 August 1995
161	114	"Nannosono Koreshiki"; Transliteration: "Nannosono Koreshiki no dan" (Japanese: 南野園是式の段)	19 August 1995
162	115	"Daredarō"; Transliteration: "Daredarō no dan" (Japanese: 駄礼田郎の段)	TBA
163	116	"The Sleeping fire jutsu technique" Transliteration: "Nemuribi no jutsu no dan" (Japanese: 眠り火の術の段)	TBA
164	117	"The Firefly's glow jutsu technique" Transliteration: "Hotarubi no jutsu no dan" (Japanese: 蛍火の術の段)	TBA
165	118	"The dangerous jutsu technique" Transliteration: "Kiken na jutsu no dan" (Japanese: 危険な術の段)	TBA
166	119	"Half-price sale" Transliteration: "Hangaku sēru no dan" (Japanese: 半額セールの段)	TBA
167	120	"Fireworks"; Transliteration: "Uchiage hanabi no dan" (Japanese: 打ち上げ花火の段)	TBA

=== Season 3 (1995-96) ===
There are 120 episodes in Season 3.

=== Season 4 (1996) ===
There are 120 episodes in Season 4.

=== Season 5 (1997-98) ===
There are 100 episodes in Season 5.

=== Season 6 (1998) ===
There are 60 episodes in Season 6.

=== Season 7 (1999) ===
There are 80 episodes in Season 7.

=== Season 8 (2000) ===
There are 80 episodes in Season 8.

=== Season 9 (2001) ===
There are 80 episodes in Season 9.

=== Season 10 (2002) ===
There are 80 episodes in Season 10.

=== Season 11 (2003) ===
There are 80 episodes in Season 11

=== Season 12 (2004) ===
There are 80 episodes in Season 12.

=== Season 13 (2005) ===
There are 56 episodes in Season 13.

=== Season 14 (2006) ===
There are 50 episodes in Season 14.

=== Season 15 (2007) ===
There are 50 episodes in Season 15.

=== Season 16 (2008) ===
There are 100 episodes in Season 16.

=== Season 17 (2009) ===
There are 90 episodes in Season 17.

=== Season 18 (2010) ===
There are 90 episodes in Season 18.

=== Season 19 (2011) ===
There are 90 episodes in Season 19.

=== Season 20 (2012) ===
There are 90 episodes in Season 20.

=== Season 21 (2013) ===
There are 75 episodes in Season 21.

=== Season 22 (2014-15) ===
There are 75 episodes in Season 22

=== Season 23 (2015-16) ===
There are 70 episodes in Season 23.

No. overall	No. in season	Title	Original release date
1814	1	"First Year Hagumi's New Semester"; Transliteration: "Ichinen Hagumi no Shin Gakki no Dan" (Japanese: 一年は組の新学期の段)	March 30, 2015
1815	2	Transliteration: "Hatago-ya no Kettō no Dan" (Japanese: はたご屋の決闘の段)	March 31, 2015
1816	3	"I'm Not a Ninja!"; Transliteration: "Ninja Janai! no Dan" (Japanese: 忍者じゃない！の段)	April 1, 2015
1817	4	"The Late at Night Class"; Transliteration: "Shinya no Jugyō no Dan" (Japanese: 深夜の授業の段)	April 2, 2015
1818	5	"Save Onigumomaru"; Transliteration: "Onigumomaru o Sukue no Dan" (Japanese: 鬼蜘蛛丸を救えの段)	April 3, 2015
1819	6	Transliteration: "Ayashī Aikotoba no Dan" (Japanese: 怪しい合言葉の段)	April 6, 2015
1820	7	"Denko Yamada's Pride"; Transliteration: "Yamada Denko no Puraido no Dan" (Japanese: 山田伝子のプライドの段)	April 7, 2015
1821	8	"Buddhist Priest-sama is a Ninja?"; Transliteration: "Oshō-sama wa Ninja? no Dan" (Japanese: 和尚様は忍者？の段)	April 8, 2015
1822	9	"The Beautiful Cleaning Duty"; Transliteration: "Utsukushī Sōji Tōban no Dan" (Japanese: 美しい掃除当番の段)	April 9, 2015
1823	10	"It's a Yōkan Case"; Transliteration: "Yōkan Jiken dayo no Dan" (Japanese: ようかん事件だよの段)	April 10, 2015
1824	11	Transliteration: "Maitake-jō no kengaku-kai no Dan" (Japanese: マイタケ城の見学会の段)	April 13, 2015
1825	12	Transliteration: "Kiken na Banbanjī! ? no Dan" (Japanese: 危険なバンバンジー！？の段)	April 14, 2015
1826	13	"The Delicious Shadou-sensei"; Transliteration: "Oishī Shadou-sensei no Dan" (Japanese: おいしい斜堂先生の段)	April 15, 2015
1827	14	"Gourmet Yamabuki"; Transliteration: "Gurume na Yamabuki no Dan" (Japanese: グルメな山ぶ鬼の段)	April 16, 2015
1828	15	Transliteration: "Otakara o Mitsuke Dase no Dan" (Japanese: お宝を見つけ出せの段)	April 17, 2015
1829	16	"A Too Strong Old Lady"; Transliteration: "Tsuyo Sugiru Obāsan no dan" (Japanese: 強すぎるおばあさんの段)	April 20, 2015
1830	17	"Let's Follow Ran, Kiri, and Shin"; Transliteration: "Ran Kiri Shin o Bikō seyo no Dan" (Japanese: 乱きりしんを尾行せよの段)	April 21, 2015
1831	18	"A Lunch? B Lunch?"; Transliteration: "Ē Ranchi? Bī Ranchi? no Dan" (Japanese: Aランチ？Bランチ？の段)	April 22, 2015
1832	19	"The Secret Basement"; Transliteration: "Himitsu no Chikashitsu no Dan" (Japanese: 秘密の地下室の段)	April 23, 2015
1833	20	"Mr. Komatsuda is a Genius!"; Transliteration: "Komatsuda-san wa Tensai! no Dan" (Japanese: 小松田さんは天才！の段)	April 24, 2015

=== Season 24 (2016) ===
There are 70 episodes in Season 24.

== Spin-offs ==
=== Ninjaboys: Quest for the Cosmic Front ===
Ninjaboys: Quest for the Cosmic Front (忍たま乱太郎の宇宙大冒険 with コズミックフロントNEXT) is a collaboration with the program Cosmic front ☆ NEXT (コズミックフロント☆NEXT) that aired in 2016.

No.	Title	Original release date
1	"Friends in the Solar System" (Japanese: 忍たま乱太郎の宇宙大冒険 with コズミックフロントNEXT 太陽系のお友だちの段)	February 11, 2016
2	"Moon Rabbit and His Craters" (Japanese: 忍たま乱太郎の宇宙大冒険 with コズミックフロントNEXT 月ウサギがクレーターをかけるの段)	March 5, 2016
3	"Finding A Baby Star on the Milky Way" (Japanese: 忍たま乱太郎の宇宙大冒険 with コズミックフロントNEXT 天の川で赤ちゃん星を見つけた!の段)	December 23, 2016
4	"Journey to the Black Hole" (Japanese: 忍たま乱太郎の宇宙大冒険 with コズミックフロントNEXT ブラックホールで危機一髪!?の段)	December 24, 2016
