= Futamata Castle =

Japanese castle

- 二俣城
- Tenryū-ku, Hamamatsu, Shizuoka prefecture, Japan
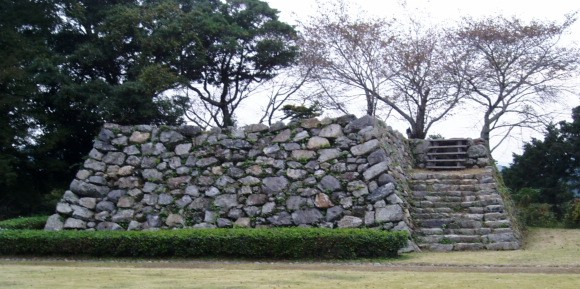
- Ruins of Futamata Castle

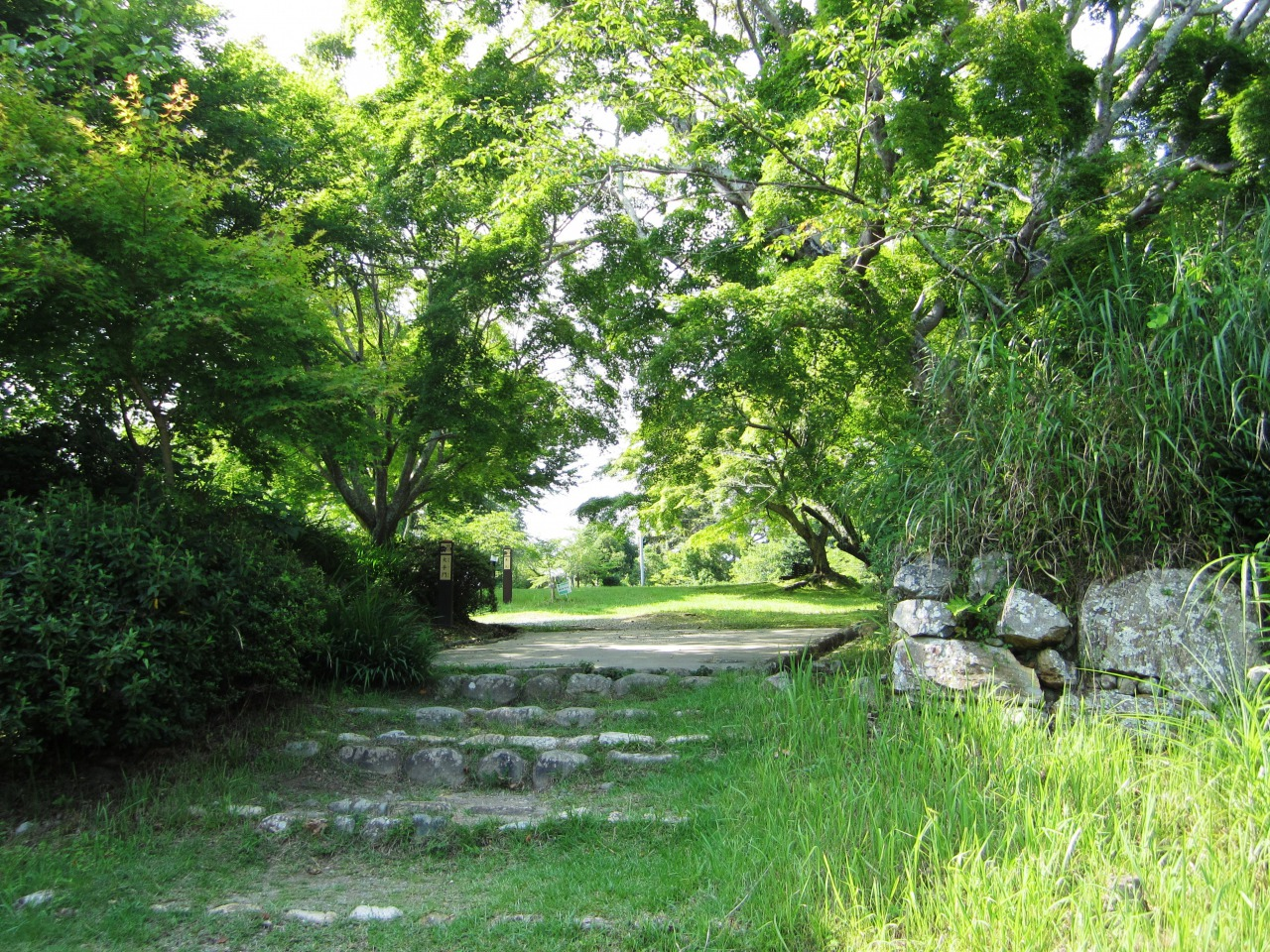
- Tobayama Castle Site

Site information
- Type: Yamajiro-style Japanese castle
- Open to the public: yes
- Condition: ruins

Location
- Location within Shizuoka Prefecture Location within Japan
- Coordinates: 34°51′43.29″N 137°48′32.16″E

Site history
- Built: 1503
- Built by: Imagawa clan
- In use: Sengoku period
- Demolished: 1600

Futamata Castle (二俣城, Futamata-jō) was a Japanese castle located in Toyoda county of Tōtōmi Province, in what is now part of Tenryū-ku in the city of Hamamatsu, Shizuoka Prefecture, Japan. It was built in the Sengoku period and is noted as the site of the death of Tokugawa Ieyasu's son Matsudaira Nobuyasu in 1579. In 2018, the ruins were recognized as a National Historic Site together with adjacent Tobayama Castle (鳥羽山城, Tobayama-jō).

== Futamata Castle ==
Futamata Castle is located on a narrow hill at the confluence of the Tenryū River with the smaller Futamata River. Surrounded in three directions by rivers, the site was a natural fortification, but was also located in a strategic area guarding the entry into southern Shinano Province.

Futamata Castle was originally built by the Imagawa clan in 1503 and was assigned to their vassals, the Matsui clan. In 1560, Imagawa Yoshimoto was defeated and killed at the Battle of Okehazama as was the castellan of Futamata, Matsui Munenobu (1515–1560). His son, Matsui Munetsune, held the castle for Yoshimoto's son, Imagawa Ujizane, but the weakened clans were unable to withstand a combined attack from their former ally Takeda Shingen and Tokugawa Ieyasu in 1569. Ieyasu occupied both Hamamatsu Castle and Futamata Castle, and assigned Futamata to his ally, Udono Ujinaga. However, fearing that Udono was indifferent towards the Takeda clan, Ieyasu soon replaced him with a fudai vassal, Nakane Masateru.

In October 1572, Takeda Shingen launched a massive invasion and overran Tōtōmi Province, capturing Futamata after a siege of one month. The Takeda forces defeated the Tokugawa clan at the Battle of Mikatagahara. However, due to the sudden death of Takeda Shingen in 1573, the invasion collapsed, and the Takeda armies retreated back to Kai Province. Over the next few years, his successor, Takeda Katsuyori, contested Tokugawa Ieyasu for control of Tōtōmi Province, but was defeated at the Battle of Nagashino by a coalition of Tokugawa Ieyasu and Oda Nobunaga. Futamata Castle remained under the control of the Takeda clan following the battle, and after a siege over six months, finally surrendered to the Tokugawa at the end of 1575.

Futamata Castle was then entrusted to Ieyasu's general Ōkubo Tadayo. In 1579, Ieyasu's son and heir, Matsudaira Nobuyasu, was ordered to relocate to Futamata Castle from Hamamatsu, where after a couple of months he was forced to commit seppuku, His mother (and Ieyasu's official wife), Lady Tsukiyama was executed as well. The official charges were that of conspiracy with the Takeda clan, but the precise reasons for this event are not entirely clear. Oda Nobunaga feared that the talented Matsudaira Nobuyasu posed a threat to his own son, Oda Nobutada, and Lady Tsukiyama was from the Imagawa clan and also had connections with the Takeda.

Nobunaga's successor, Toyotomi Hideyoshi, ordered that the Tokugawa relocate to the Kantō region in 1590, and gave both Futamata and Hamamatsu's castles to his own general, Horio Yoshiharu. Yoshiharu reformed the castle with stone walls and a main keep, but was subsequently transferred to Izumo Province in 1600, at which time the castle was abandoned. In 1896, a Shinto shrine dedicated to the war dead of the First Sino-Japanese War was constructed on the site of the northern kuruwa enclosure. It was subsequently rededicated to include the war dead of the Russo-Japanese War and the Pacific War.

== Tobayama Castle ==
Tobayama Castle is located on the next hill from Futamata Castle, separated by the narrow Futamata River. It was originally built in 1572 by the Tokugawa forces laying siege to Futamata Castle, but was later expanded and rebuilt by Horio Yoshiharu as a residential castle, as Futamata Castle had only limited space to build a large residence.

The inner bailey of Tobayama Castle is a 100-meter-square space surrounded by stone walls with a masugata (composite gate) guarded by large stones.

The two castles were operated as one by Horio Yoshiharu and Tobayama Castle was also abandoned in 1600. Half broken stone walls remain at the site of its inner bailey.

== See also ==
- List of Historic Sites of Japan (Shizuoka)
