= Ōkubo Tadataka =

- 大久保 忠教
- Born: 1560; Kamiwada, Mikawa Province
- Died: April 2, 1639 (aged 78–79)
- Occupation: Hatamoto
- Writing career
- Subject: History
- Notable work: Mikawa Monogatari

Ōkubo Tadataka (大久保 忠教) or Ōkubo Hikozaemon (大久保 彦左衛門; Japanese pronunciation: [ò̞ó̞.kɯ̈́.bó̞ (|) çi̥.kó̞.(d͡)zä́.è̞.mò̞ɴ̀, -é̞.mó̞ɴ́, ó̞ó̞-], 1560 – 2 April 1639) was a Japanese warrior in the Sengoku and Edo periods. He was the eighth son of Ōkubo Tadakazu, a vassal of the Tokugawa clan. Tadataka wrote the Mikawa Monogatari (三河物語), a work he wrote for his descendants, telling the way a warrior should live, mixed with a chronicle of the accomplishments of the Tokugawa and Ōkubo clans.

== Biography ==
Tadataka was born in Kamiwada, Mikawa Province, the son of Tokugawa retainer Ōkubo Tadakazu. His older brother was Ōkubo Tadayo. He joined Tadayo at age 17 for his first campaign, during the subjugation of Tōtōmi Province. Tadataka's first battle was the siege of Inui Castle. From then on, he fought in many battles, under Tadayo or his other brother, Ōkubo Tadasuke. Tadataka served with distinction at the Battle of Takatenjin Castle, taking the head of enemy general Okabe Motonobu. He also fought at the siege of Ueda Castle. After the Siege of Odawara, when Tokugawa Ieyasu moved to the Kantō Region, he granted Tadataka land assessed at 3,000 koku, and appointed him yari-bugyō (magistrate of spears) in the Tokugawa main battle camp.

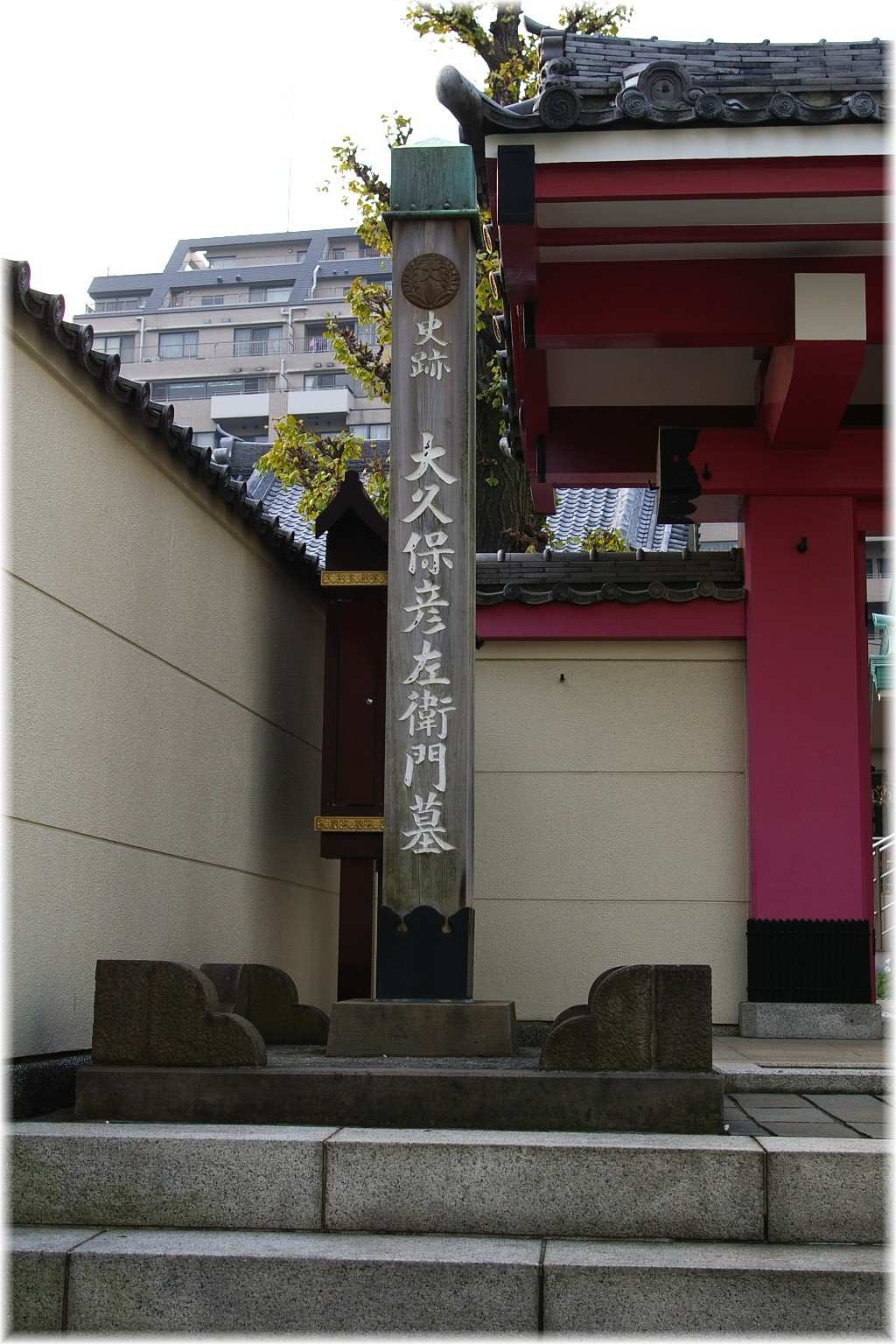
Site of Tadataka's grave at Ryūgyō-ji

Tadataka also served at Sekigahara and the Siege of Osaka; his service stretched over the careers of the first three Tokugawa shōguns.

Tadataka died at age 80. His graves are in Okazaki, Kyoto, and at Ryūgyō-ji, a temple in Minato, Tokyo.
