= Battle of Ukino =

1558 battle between the forces of Oda Nobunaga and his cousin, Oda Nobukata

Coordinates: 35°16′31″N 136°52′38″E

- Part of the Sengoku period
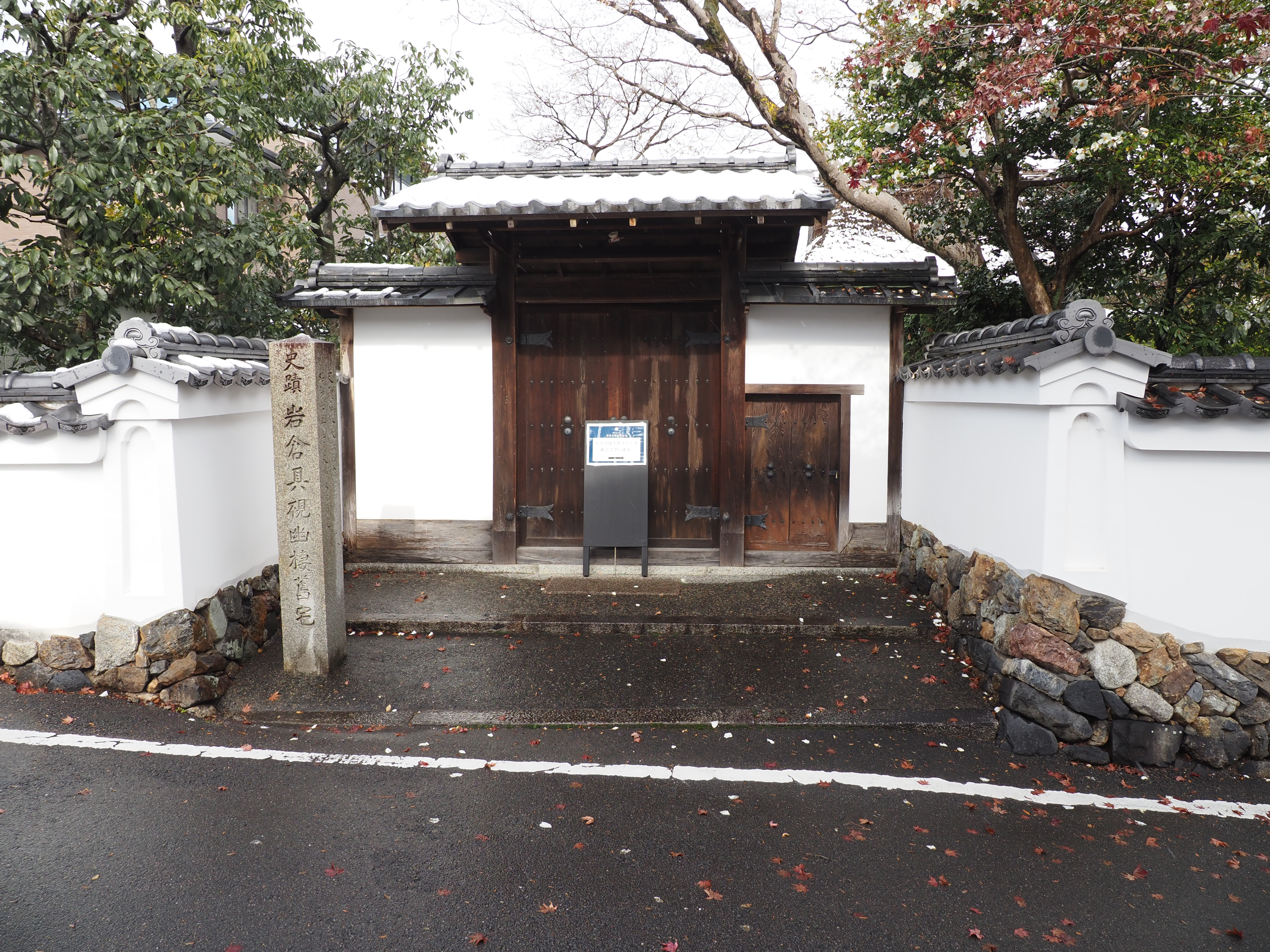
- Iwakura House
Date	August 24th, 1558 (Gregorian calendar)
Location	Iwakura, Owari Province, Japan
Result	Oda Nobunaga victory
Territorial changes	In 1559. Oda Nobunaga captured the provincial capital of Iwakura and united whole of Owari province.

Belligerents
Oda clan of Nagoya Castle	Oda clan of Iwakura Castle

Commanders and leaders
Oda Nobunaga; Oda Nobukiyo; Maeda Toshiie; Niwa Nagahide; Mizuno Tadashige	Oda Nobukata

Strength
2,000+1,000 Nobukiyo reinforcement	3,000

Casualties and losses
light	1,250
- Location within Aichi Prefecture Battle of Ukino (Japan)

Battle of Ukino (July 12, 1558) was the final victory of Oda Nobunaga in his struggle to unite the province of Owari against his cousin, Oda Nobukata, deputy governor of northern Owari.

== Background ==
Places in the provinces of Owari and Mikawa around 1558 on the map of Aichi Prefecture. Places under the control of Oda Nobunaga are marked in red.

After defeating the Imagawa clan of Suruga in the Battle of Muraki and capturing the southern provincial capital of Kiyosu (both in 1554), Oda Nobunaga united the Southern Owari under his rule. In 1555, Saitō Dōsan, Nobunaga's father-in-law and ally retired as the lord of Mino Province (north of Owari) for his eldest son, Saitō Yoshitatsu. However, on January 4, 1556 Yoshitatsu killed his two brothers, leading to a military conflict with his father. Nobunaga supported Dōsan, but Yoshitatsu defeated and killed Dōsan in battle in April 1556.

Seeing the fall of Nobunaga's father-in-law as an opportunity, Oda Nobuyasu of Iwakura Castle allied with Yoshitatsu and opened hostilities against Nobunaga.

Nobunaga defeated his younger brother, Oda Nobuyuki who was supported by Oda Nobuyasu, in the Battle of Inō in 1556. He resolved the internal struggle and rebellion in his own family and was firmly established as the ruler of the southern Owari. The northern part of the province was still the domain of his cousin, Oda Nobukata (successor of Oda Nobuyasu), deputy governor of the northern Owari.

== Battle ==
Mizuno Tadashige of Nobunaga side was the first to clash with the Nobukata forces, breaking through with his spear, and then handed the head over to his brother, Sakai Tadatsugu, who took it.

Nobunaga defeated the forces of Oda Nobukata at Ukino in Owari on August 24, 1558 with the support of his cousin, Oda Nobukiyo of Inuyama. (Japanese calendar date: Eiroku era: 1st year, 7th month, 12th day). As a result, Oda Nobukata retreated to Iwakura Castle.

== Aftermath ==
In 1559, Nobunaga besieged, captured, and razed Iwakura Castle to the ground, ending the Iwakura branch of the Oda family and finally uniting the whole province of Owari under his rule. Later that year Nobunaga visited Kyoto and was received by Shogun Ashikaga Yoshiteru, gaining the formal appointment of deputy governor (shugodai) of Owari.

== Literature ==
- Chaplin, Danny (2018). Sengoku Jidai. Nobunaga, Hideyoshi, and Ieyasu : three unifiers of Japan. Createspace Independent Publishing Platform. pp. 55–63. ISBN 978-1-9834-5020-4. OCLC 1111714915.
- Ōta, Gyūichi (2011). The chronicle of Lord Nobunaga. J. S. A. Elisonas, Jeroen Pieter Lamers. Leiden: Brill. p. 3. ISBN 978-90-04-20456-0. OCLC 743693801.
- Turnbull, Stephen R. (2005). Samurai commanders. Oxford: Osprey Publishing. p. 6. ISBN 1-84176-743-3. OCLC 60834971.
- Turnbull, Stephen R. (2002). War in Japan 1467-1615. Oxford: Osprey. p. 18. ISBN 1-84176-480-9. OCLC 50564411.
