= Takatenjin Castle =

Castle in Kakegawa City, Shizuoka Prefecture, Japan

- 高天神城
- Kakegawa, Shizuoka, Japan
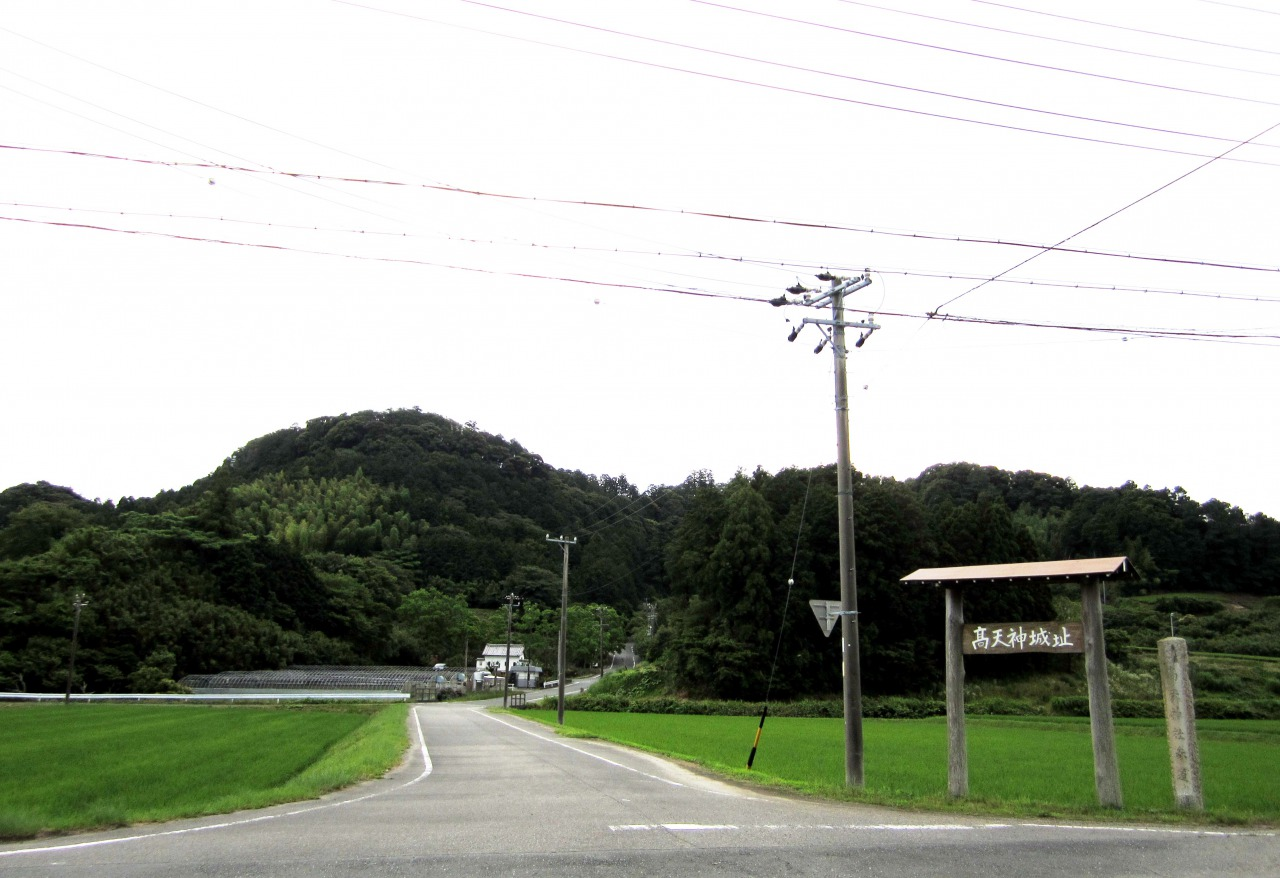
- Takatenjin Castle ruins

Site information
- Type: yamashiro-style Japanese castle
- Controlled by: Imagawa clan, Takeda clan
- Condition: Ruins

Location
- Location within Shizuoka Prefecture Location within Japan
- Coordinates: 34°41′54.59″N 138°2′6.98″E

Site history
- Built: Year Unknown
- In use: until 1581

Takatenjin Castle (高天神城, Takatenjin-jō) was a Sengoku period yamashiro-style Japanese castle located in the Kamihijikata and Shimohijikata neighborhoods of the city of Kakegawa, Shizuoka prefecture. The ruins have been protected as a National Historic Site since 1975, with the area under protection extended in 2007.

== Overview ==
Takatenjin Castle is located in the southeast part of the center of modern Kakegawa on the road towards the eastern seaside area of Tōtōmi province. Located on Mount Kakuo, a 200-meter mountain with sheer cliffs accessible only by a narrow pathway, the castle was traditionally held to be the "key" to securing Tōtōmi Province and the Tōkaidō highway, which is eleven kilometers to the south. The layout of the castle is that of a letter "Z" consisting of the eastern and western peaks of a mountain with the saddle in between. the eastern peak was the original fortification, containing the inner bailey and both peaks are protected by terraces with dry moats and earthen ramparts. The western peak was added at a later time when the castle was under the control of the Takeda clan. The connecting saddle area is 50 meters long, but only 10 meters wide. The total length of the castle was 400 meters by 200 meters wide. Although the castle did not have stone walls, the mountain has very steep slopes and the castle was considered almost impregnable.

== History ==
The origins of Takatenjin Castle are obscure. It may have been built at some point in the 15th century by the Kushima clan, a minor local clan who were retainers of the Imagawa clan. Kushima Masashige (1492-1521) led the Imagawa army during a failed invasion of Kai province, reaching the approaches to Kōfu before being defeated by the Takeda clan under Takeda Nobutora. The clan was later suppressed during the reign of Imagawa Yoshimoto for siding with his enemies during an internal power struggle. Imagawa Yoshimoto gave the castle to the Ogasawara clan. Although the Imagawa were defeated by a coalition between Oda Nobunaga and Tokugawa Ieyasu and the Tokugawa clan gained control of the castle, Ieyasu left Ogasawara Nagatada as castellan at the time of the Battle of Anegawa in 1570.

In 1571, Takeda Shingen laid siege to Takatenjin Castle with 20,000 men. Although he captured most of Tōtōmi Province, he was unsuccessful in taking this castle. However, during the Siege of Takatenjin (1574) Takatenjin fell to the forces of Takeda Katsuyori. Katsuyori gained great prestige in the capture of a castle where his famous father had failed. However, this glory was short-lived, as the following year the Takeda clan suffered severe losses against the Oda-Tokugawa alliance and found it impossible to keep the supply lines to Takatenjin Castle open. Nevertheless, the defenders of Tatatenjin continued to put up a stubborn resistance, and by 1580, Ieyasu had given up on attempts to capture the castle by assault, but instead built six bases around the castle to keep it isolated. When the defenders ran out of supplies by March 1581, the castellan Okabe Motonobu led his remaining 700 men on a charge against the Oda lines in an attempt to break the siege known as the Siege of Takatenjin (1581), but all were killed. The castle was abandoned soon afterwards.

The castle was listed as one of the Continued Top 100 Japanese Castles in 2017.

The city of Kakegawa maintains the ruins and several hiking courses on the mountain. On the summit is a Shinto shrine and monuments to the war dead from the Satsuma Rebellion and First Sino-Japanese War. A faux tenshu was constructed on the summit before World War II, but was subsequently destroyed by lightning and only a concrete base remains.

== See also ==
- List of Historic Sites of Japan (Shizuoka)
- Sieges of Takatenjin
