= Motonobu =

- Gender: Male

Origin
- Origin: Japanese
- Meaning: Different meanings depending on the kanji used

Motonobu (written: 元信, 基信 or 仁重) is a masculine Japanese given name. Notable people with the name include:

- Endō Motonobu (遠藤 基信) (1532–1585), Japanese samurai
- Kanō Motonobu (狩野 元信) (1476–1559), Japanese painter
- Okabe Motonobu (岡部 元信) (died 1581), Japanese samurai
- Suzuki Motonobu (鈴木 元信) (1555–1620), Japanese samurai
- Motonobu Tako (田光 仁重) (born 1972), Japanese footballer
- Motonobu Tanishige (谷繁 元信) (born 1970), Japanese baseball player
