= Munenobu =

- Gender: Male

Origin
- Origin: Japanese
- Meaning: Different meanings depending on the kanji used

Munenobu (written: 宗宣 or 宗信) is a masculine Japanese given name. Notable people with the name include:

- Hōjō Munenobu (北条 宗宣) (1259–1312), Japanese noble
- Matsui Munenobu (松井 宗信) (1515–1560), Japanese samurai
