= Nobumoto =

Nobumoto (written: 信本) is a Japanese surname. Notable people with the surname include:

- Keiko Nobumoto (信本 敬子) (born 1964), Japanese anime screenwriter

Nobumoto (written: 信元) is also a masculine Japanese given name. Notable people with the name include:

- Mizuno Nobumoto (水野 信元) (died 1576), Japanese daimyō
