= Kagemusha =

1980 film directed by Akira Kurosawa

- Theatrical poster
- Directed by: Akira Kurosawa
- Screenplay by: Akira Kurosawa; Masato Ide
- Produced by: Akira Kurosawa; Tomoyuki Tanaka
- Starring: Tatsuya Nakadai
- Cinematography: Takao Saito; Shoji Ueda
- Edited by: Akira Kurosawa (uncredited)
- Music by: Shin'ichirō Ikebe
- Production companies: Kurosawa Production; Toho
- Distributed by: Toho (Japan); 20th Century-Fox (International)
- Release date: April 26, 1980 (Japan)
- Running time: 180 minutes
- Country: Japan
- Language: Japanese
- Budget: ¥2.3 billion; ($11 million) or $7.5 million or $6 million
- Box office: $33.4 million (worldwide)

Kagemusha (影武者; Shadow Warrior) is a 1980 Japanese epic jidaigeki film directed by Akira Kurosawa. It is set in the Sengoku period of Japanese history and tells the story of a lower-class petty thief who is taught to impersonate the dying daimyō Takeda Shingen to dissuade opposing lords from attacking the newly vulnerable clan. Kagemusha is the Japanese term for a political decoy, literally meaning "shadow warrior". The film ends with the climactic 1575 Battle of Nagashino.

Kagemusha was released to critical acclaim. The film won the Palme d'Or at the 1980 Cannes Film Festival (tied with All That Jazz). It was also nominated for the Academy Award for Best Foreign Language Film and received other honours. In 2009 the film was voted at No. 59 on the list of The Greatest Japanese Films of All Time by Japanese film magazine Kinema Junpo.

== Plot ==
During the Sengoku period, in 1571, Takeda Shingen, daimyō of Kai province from the Takeda clan, meets a thief his brother Nobukado has spared from crucifixion due to the thief's uncanny resemblance to Shingen. The brothers agree that he would prove useful as a double, and they decide to use the thief as a kagemusha, a political decoy. Later, while the Takeda army lays siege to a castle belonging to Tokugawa Ieyasu, Shingen is shot while listening to a flute playing in the enemy camp. He orders his forces to withdraw and, before succumbing to his wound, commands his generals to keep his death a secret for three years. Meanwhile, Shingen's rivals Oda Nobunaga, Tokugawa Ieyasu, and Uesugi Kenshin puzzle over the reason for Shingen's withdrawal, unaware of his death.

Nobukado presents the thief to Shingen's generals, proposing to have him impersonate Shingen full-time. Although the thief is unaware of Shingen's death initially, he eventually finds Shingen's preserved corpse in a large jar, having believed it to contain treasure. The generals then decide they cannot trust the thief and release him. Later, the jar is dropped into Lake Suwa, which spies working for the Tokugawa and Oda forces witness. Suspecting that Shingen has died, the spies go to report their observation, but the thief, having overheard the spies, returns to the Takeda forces and offers to work as a kagemusha. The Takeda clan preserves the deception by announcing that they were simply making an offering of sake to the god of the lake, and the spies are ultimately convinced by the thief's performance.

Returning home, the kagemusha convinces Shingen's retinue by imitating the late warlord's gestures and learning more about him. When the kagemusha must preside over a clan meeting, he is instructed by Nobukado to remain silent until Nobukado brings the generals to a consensus, whereupon the kagemusha will simply agree with the generals' plan and dismiss the council. However, Shingen's son Katsuyori is incensed by his father's decree of the three year subterfuge, which delays his inheritance and leadership of the clan. Katsuyori thus decides to test the kagemusha in front of the council, as the majority of the attendants are still unaware of Shingen's death. He directly asks the kagemusha what course of action should be taken, but the kagemusha is able to answer convincingly in Shingen's own manner, which further convinces the generals.

In 1573, Nobunaga mobilizes his forces to attack Azai Nagamasa, continuing his campaign in central Honshu to maintain his control of Kyoto against the growing opposition. When the Tokugawa and Oda forces launch an attack against the Takeda, Katsuyori begins a counter-offensive against the advice of his generals. The kagemusha is then forced to lead reinforcements in the Battle of Takatenjin, and he helps inspire the troops to victory. However, in a later fit of overconfidence, the kagemusha attempts to ride Shingen's notoriously temperamental horse, and falls off. When those who rush to help him see that he does not have Shingen's battle scars, he is revealed as an impostor, and is driven out in disgrace, allowing Katsuyori to take over the clan. Sensing weakness in the Takeda clan leadership, the Oda and Tokugawa forces are emboldened to begin a full-scale offensive into the Takeda homeland.

By 1575, now in full control of the Takeda army, Katsuyori leads a counter-offensive against Nobunaga in Nagashino. Although courageous in their assault, several waves of Takeda cavalry and infantry are cut down by volleys of gunfire from Oda arquebusiers deployed behind wooden stockades, effectively eliminating the Takeda army. The kagemusha, who has followed the Takeda army, desperately takes up a spear and charges toward the Oda lines before being shot himself. Mortally wounded, the kagemusha attempts to retrieve the fūrinkazan banner, which had fallen into a river, but succumbs to his wounds and is carried away by the current.

== Cast ==
- Tatsuya Nakadai as Takeda Shingen (武田 信玄) and the Kagemusha (影武者)
- Tsutomu Yamazaki as Takeda Nobukado (武田 信廉), Shingen's younger brother.
- Kenichi Hagiwara as Takeda Katsuyori (武田 勝頼), Shingen's son and heir.
- Jinpachi Nezu as Tsuchiya Sohachiro (土屋 宗八郎), chief bodyguard for Takeda Shingen and the Kagemusha.
- Hideji Ōtaki as Yamagata Masakage (山縣 昌景), Shingen's most experienced general.
- Daisuke Ryu as Oda Nobunaga (織田 信長), one of Shingen's chief rivals for control of Japan.
- Masayuki Yui as Tokugawa Ieyasu (徳川 家康), Nobunaga's strongest ally.
- Kaori Momoi as Otsuyanokata (お津弥の方), one of Shingen's concubines.
- Mitsuko Baisho as Oyunokata (於ゆうの方), another one of Shingen's concubines.
- Hideo Murota as Baba Nobuharu (馬場 信春), one of the chief generals in the Takeda Clan's army.
- Takayuki Shiho as Naitō Masatoyo (内藤 昌豊), another important general in the Takeda Clan's army.
- Kōji Shimizu as Atobe Katsusuke (跡部 勝資)
- Noburo Shimizu as Hara Masatane (原 昌胤)
- Sen Yamamoto as Oyamada Nobushige (小山田 信茂)
- Shuhei Sugimori as Kōsaka Masanobu (高坂 昌信)
- Takashi Shimura as Taguchi Gyobu (田口刑部)
- Eiichi Kanakubo as Uesugi Kenshin (上杉 謙信), Shingen's other chief rival for control of Japan.
- Francis Selleck as Priest
- Jirō Yabuki as Equestrian
- Kamatari Fujiwara as Doctor

== Production ==
Kurosawa's own artwork

George Lucas and Francis Ford Coppola are credited at the end of the film as executive producers in the international version. This is because they persuaded 20th Century-Fox to make up a shortfall in the film's budget when the original producers, Toho Studios, could not afford to complete the film. In return, 20th Century-Fox received the international distribution rights to the film. Coppola and Kurosawa appeared together in Suntory whisky commercials to raise money for the production.

Kurosawa originally cast the actor Shintaro Katsu in the title role. Katsu left the production, however, before the first day of shooting was over; in an interview for the Criterion Collection DVD, executive producer Coppola states that Katsu angered Kurosawa by arriving with his own camera crew to record Kurosawa's filmmaking methods. It is unclear whether Katsu was fired or left of his own accord, but he was replaced by Tatsuya Nakadai, a well-known actor who had appeared in a number of Kurosawa's previous films. Nakadai played both the kagemusha and the lord whom he impersonated.

Kurosawa wrote a part in Kagemusha for his longtime regular actor Takashi Shimura, and Kagemusha was the last Kurosawa film in which Shimura appeared. However, the scene in which he plays a servant who accompanies a Catholic missionary and doctor to a meeting with Shingen was cut from the foreign release of the film. The Criterion Collection DVD release of the film restored this scene as well as approximately another eighteen minutes in the film.

According to Lucas, Kurosawa used 5,000 extras for the final battle sequence, filming for a whole day, then he cut it down to 90 seconds in the final release. Many special effects, and a number of scenes that filled holes in the story, landed on the "cutting-room floor".

== Release ==
Kagemusha was released theatrically in Japan on April 26, 1980, where it was distributed by Toho. It was released in the United States theatrically on October 6, 1980, where it was distributed by Twentieth Century-Fox. The theatrical version in the United States had a 162-minute running time. It was released on home video in the United States with a 180-minute running time in 2005.

== Reception ==
=== Box office ===
Kagemusha was the number one Japanese film on the domestic market in 1980, earning ¥2.7 billion in distribution rental income. It earned $8 million within ten days of release at 217 Japanese theaters. The film grossed a total of ¥5.5 billion ($26 million) in Japanese box office gross receipts.

Overseas, the film grossed $4 million in the United States (equivalent to over $14 million adjusted for inflation in 2021) from 1.5 million ticket sales. In France, where it released on 1 October 1980, the film sold 904,627 tickets, equivalent to an estimated gross revenue of approximately €2,442,500 ($3,401,000). This brings the film's total estimated worldwide gross revenue to approximately $33,401,000 (equivalent to $131,000,000 in 2025).

=== Critical response ===
Kagemusha has an approval rating of 89% on review aggregator website Rotten Tomatoes, based on 27 reviews, and an average rating of 7.6/10. The website's critical consensus states: "Epic in scope and awash with striking color, Kagemusha marks Akira Kurosawa's successful return to the samurai epic". Metacritic assigned the film a weighted average score of 84 out of 100, based on 15 critics, indicating "universal acclaim".

=== Accolades ===
Kagemusha won numerous honours in Japan and abroad, marking the beginning of Kurosawa's most successful decade in international awards, the 1980s. At the 1980 Cannes Film Festival, Kagemusha shared the Palme d'Or with All That Jazz. At the 53rd Academy Awards, Kagemusha was nominated for Best Art Direction (Yoshirō Muraki) and Best Foreign Language Film.

Award	Date of ceremony	Category	Recipient(s)	Result	Ref(s)
Academy Awards	March 31, 1981	Best Foreign Language Film	Akira Kurosawa	Nominated	
Academy Awards	March 31, 1981	Best Art Direction	Yoshirō Muraki	Nominated	
British Academy Film Awards	March 22, 1981	Best Film	Akira Kurosawa, Tomoyuki Tanaka	Nominated	
British Academy Film Awards	March 22, 1981	Best Direction	Akira Kurosawa	Won	
British Academy Film Awards	March 22, 1981	Best Cinematography	Takao Saito, Shôji Ueda	Nominated	
British Academy Film Awards	March 22, 1981	Best Costume Design	Seiichiro Momosawa	Won	
Cannes Film Festival	May 23, 1980	Palme d'Or	Akira Kurosawa	Won	
César Awards	January 31, 1981	Best Foreign Film	Akira Kurosawa	Won	
David di Donatello	September 26, 1981	Best Foreign Director	Akira Kurosawa	Won	
David di Donatello	September 26, 1981	Best Foreign Producer	Francis Ford Coppola, George Lucas	Won	
Golden Globe Awards	January 31, 1981	Best Foreign Language Film	Akira Kurosawa	Nominated	
Mainichi Film Awards	1980	Best Film	Akira Kurosawa	Won	
Mainichi Film Awards	1980	Best Director	Akira Kurosawa	Won	
Mainichi Film Awards	1980	Best Actor	Tatsuya Nakadai	Won	
Mainichi Film Awards	1980	Best Art Direction	Yoshirô Muraki	Won	
Mainichi Film Awards	1980	Best Music	Shin'ichirō Ikebe	Won	
National Board of Review	January 26, 1981	Top Foreign Films	Akira Kurosawa	Won	

In 2016, The Hollywood Reporter ranked the film 10th among 69 counted winners of the Palme d'Or to date, concluding "Set against the wars of 16th-century Japan, Kurosawa's majestic samurai epic is still awe-inspiring, not only in its historical pageantry, but for imagery that communicates complex ideas about reality, belief and meaning."

== See also ==
- List of submissions to the 53rd Academy Awards for Best Foreign Language Film
- List of Japanese submissions for the Academy Award for Best Foreign Language Film
