= Mizuno Nobumoto =

Japanese daimyō

Mizuno Nobumoto (水野 信元; 1537 – January 27, 1576) was a Japanese daimyō of the Sengoku period. He was Tokugawa Ieyasu's uncle through Matsudaira Hirotada's marriage to his sister, Odai no Kata.

== Biography ==
He was a son of Mizuno Tadamasa, and brother of Mizuno Tadashige.

In 1542, Nobumoto sided with Oda Nobuhide, but later served to Tokugawa Ieyasu.

In 1543, he succeeded his father as lord of Kariya Castle.

In 1554, the Imagawa clan came to the west and built the Muraki Castle in the southeast of Owari, besieging Mizuno Nobumoto at his castle of Ogawa. Mizuno Nobumoto informed about the situation to Oda Nobunaga. Later, Nobunaga marched his army north and attacked the Imagawa forces in the Battle of Muraki Castle.

In 1576, under Ieyasu, he was assigned to defend Kariya Castle. However, in that same year, he betrayed Tokugawa Ieyasu and was killed. His brother, Mizuno Tadashige succeeded him and helped Tokugawa Ieyasu during the Battle of Sekigahara in 1600 before getting killed by Kaganoi Shigemochi, ending the family line.
