= Siege of Futamata =

1572 siege in Japan

- Part of the Sengoku period
Date	1572
Location	Futamata fortress, Tōtōmi Province, Japan
Result	garrison surrenders; Takeda victory

Belligerents
forces of Takeda Shingen	forces of Tokugawa Ieyasu

Commanders and leaders
Takeda Katsuyori	Makane Masateru

Futamata fortress was Takeda Shingen's first objective in his campaign against Tokugawa Ieyasu. In 1572 he left the siege of Futamata in the hands of his son and heir Takeda Katsuyori.

== Description ==
The fortress was built on the edge of a cliff, overlooking the Tenryū river; Katsuyori noticed that the garrison's water supply was obtained via a complex system of dropping wooden buckets to the river and pulling them back up. He decided to send unmanned rafts down the river; these smashed into the well-tower and toppled it. Deprived of their water supply, the Tokugawa garrison quickly surrendered.

The Takeda would press on past Futamata towards the major Tokugawa fortress at Hamamatsu, where they would fight the Battle of Mikatagahara two months later.
