= Battle of Muraki Castle =

1554 battle between the forces of Oda Nobunaga and Imagawa clan

Coordinates: 34°59′48″N 136°58′8″E

- Part of the Sengoku period
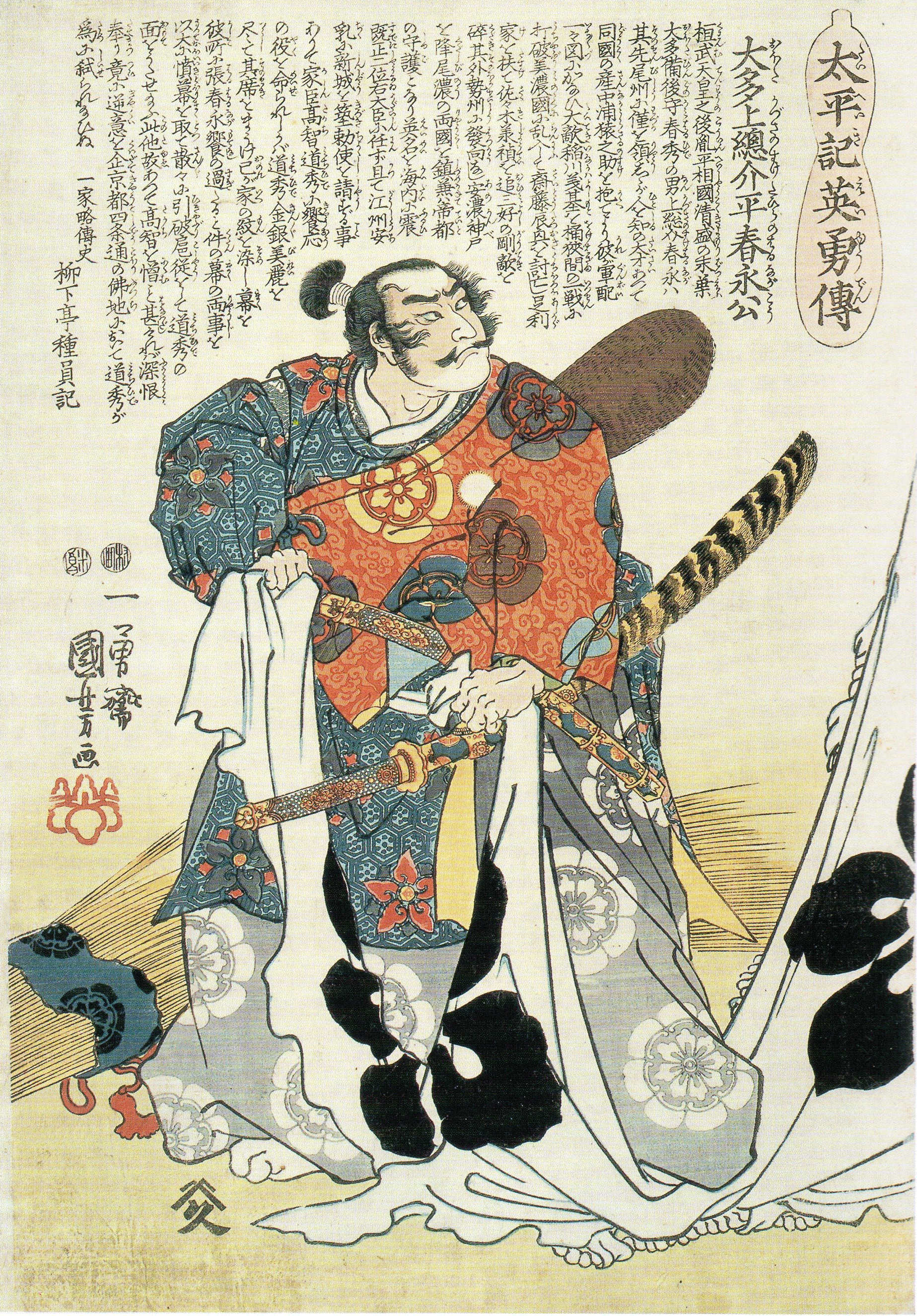
- Oda Nobunaga (1534-1582) was but a minor young daimyo at the time of the battle.
Date	January 24, 1554
Location	Chita Peninsula, Owari Province, Japan
Result	Oda victory
Territorial changes	Oda Nobunaga recaptured parts of eastern Owari Province from Imagawa clan of Suruga

Belligerents
Imagawa clan	Oda clan Mizuno clan

Commanders and leaders
Imagawa Yoshimoto; Sessai Chōrō	Oda Nobunaga; Oda Nobumitsu; Mizuno Nobumoto; Mizuno Tadawake

Strength
1,000	1,300: 800 Spear ashigaru; 500 Arquebusier ashigaru

Casualties and losses
Heavy	400
- Location within Aichi Prefecture Battle of Muraki Castle (Japan)

The Battle of Muraki Castle (January 24, 1554) was one of the first victories of the young Oda Nobunaga in his struggle to unite the province of Owari against the powerful Imagawa Yoshimoto, whose army had invaded the eastern parts of Owari.

== Background ==
Places in the provinces of Owari and Mikawa around 1554 on the map of Aichi Prefecture. Places under the control of Oda Nobunaga are marked in red.

In the spring of 1552, the seventeen-year-old Oda Nobunaga inherited family estates in the southwestern part of Owari Province (around Nagoya Castle). The southern parts of the province were ruled by his cousins, Oda from Kiyosu Castle. The eastern parts were ruled by the powerful Imagawa Yoshimoto, who at the time also ruled the neighboring provinces of Mikawa, Totomi and Suruga, and by their vassals, the Matsudaira clan (later Tokugawa) from Mikawa.

Also in the spring of 1552, a civil war began between Oda Nobunaga and Oda of Kiyosu in Owari. In response, the Imagawa clan moved west and built Muraki Castle in the southeast of Owari, besieging one of Nobunaga's vassals, Mizuno Nobumoto (uncle of Tokugawa Ieyasu), in his castle of Ogawa. Another vassal was persuaded to surrender the castle of Terumoto, cutting off Ogawa from the rest of the Nobunaga's territory.

== Battle ==
Oda Nobunaga enlisted the help of his father in law Saito Dosan, lord of the province of Mino. Dosan immediately sent him 1,000 samurai, which Nobunaga left to protect Nagoya from the Oda of Kiyosu, and Nobunaga embarked his army 800 ashigaru armed with long spears and 500 ashigaru with arquebuses (which at that time were still new weapons in Japan only imported in 1543) on the ships in Atsuta port south of Nagoya and sailed 13 miles along Ise Bay, landing southwest of Ogawa Castle.

After personally marching to Ogawa Castle to be informed by Mizuno Nobumoto about the situation, Nobunaga marched his army north and attacked the Imagawa forces in Muraki Castle.

The battle of Muraki was the first to demonstrate Nobunaga's military talent. Not only was the naval landing on the Chita Peninsula well organized, Nobunaga's arquebusiers employed a coordinated reloading and volley fire tactic in rotating platoons, which kept the ramparts of the castle under continuous fire. The ferocity of the gunfire frightened defenders so much that they surrendered on the first call. The next day Nobunaga took Terumoto Castle in the same way, burnt it to the ground and executed its owners, in order to show his vassals the consequence of betrayal. Then he retreated to Nagoya Castle and gave his thanks to Dosan's troops under Ando Morinari. later Morinari and his troops returned to Mino.

== Aftermath ==
Defeating the threat of the powerful Imagawa clan, Nobunaga gained a great reputation in Owari and got a free hand for the final showdown with Oda Nobutomo of Kiyosu. Three months later, Oda Nobunaga took Kiyosu Castle by treachery and united southern half of Owari

It is said Nobunaga shed tears at the scene of mayhem, because at least 400 of his retainers and soldiers killed in this battle.

== Literature ==
- Chaplin, Danny (2018). Sengoku Jidai. Nobunaga, Hideyoshi, and Ieyasu : three unifiers of Japan. pp. 55–63. ISBN 978-1-9834-5020-4. OCLC 1111714915.
- Ōta, Gyūichi (2011). The chronicle of Lord Nobunaga. J. S. A. Elisonas, Jeroen Pieter Lamers. Leiden: Brill. p. 3. ISBN 978-90-04-20456-0. OCLC 743693801.
- Turnbull, Stephen R. (2005). Samurai commanders. Oxford: Osprey Publishing. p. 6. ISBN 1-84176-743-3. OCLC 60834971.
- Turnbull, Stephen R. (2002). War in Japan 1467-1615. Oxford: Osprey. p. 18. ISBN 1-84176-480-9. OCLC 50564411.
