= Mizuno Tadamasa =

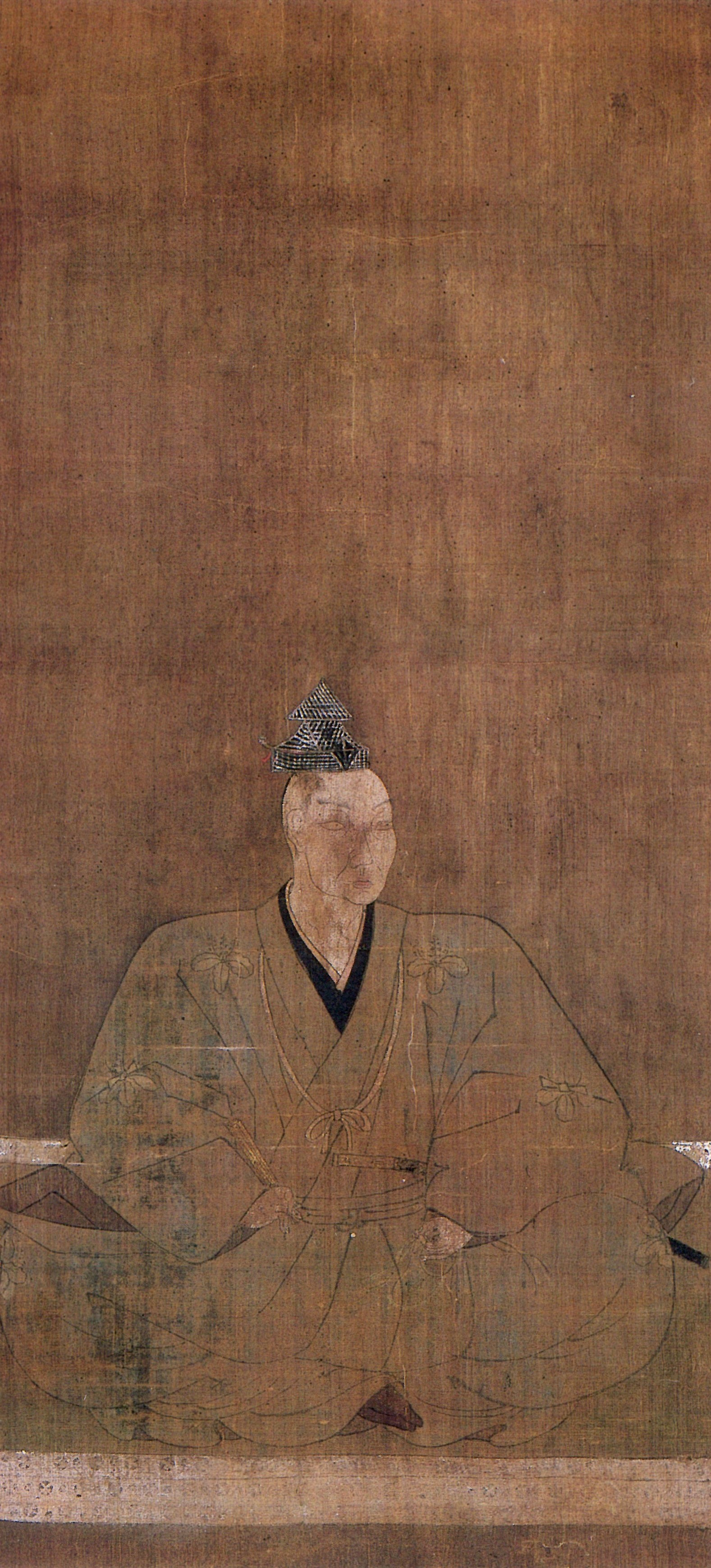
Mizuno Tadamasa

Mizuno Tadamasa (水野 忠政, 1493 – 22 August 1543) was a Japanese samurai lord and daimyo of the Sengoku period. He was the father of Odai no Kata, the mother of shōgun Tokugawa Ieyasu. He was a member of the Mizuno clan.

In 1533, Mizuno Tadamasa built and ruled Kariya Castle. Tadamasa was the father of Mizuno Nobumoto and Mizuno Tadashige.

== Literature ==
- Sadler, AL: Shogun: The Life of Tokugawa Ieyasu . Tuttle Publishing, 1978. ISBN 978-4-8053-1042-7 . (In English)
