= Siege of Kanbara =

1569 siege during the Sengoku period

- Part of the Sengoku period
| Date | 1569 |
| Location | Kanbara castle, Suruga province |
| Result | Siege successful, Takeda victory |

Belligerents
| Forces of Takeda Shingen | Forces of Hōjō Ujiyasu |

Commanders and leaders
| Takeda Katsuyori | Hōjō Ujinobu † |

Strength
| Unknown | 1,000 |

The 1569 siege of Kanbara was one of many sieges undertaken by the Takeda clan against the territories of the Hōjō clan during Japan's Sengoku period.

Takeda Katsuyori, the son of clan head Takeda Shingen, led the siege against Kanbara castle in Suruga province, which was held by a garrison of 1,000 men under the command of Hōjō Genan's son, Hōjō Ujinobu. The castle fell on 6 December 1569, and Ujinobu was forced to kill himself.
