= Fūrinkazan =

War banner of Japanese daimyo Takeda Shingen

Fūrinkazan banner

Fūrinkazan (Japanese: 風林火山; "Wind, Forest, Fire, Mountain") is a popularized version of the battle standard used by the Sengoku period daimyō Takeda Shingen. The banner quoted four phrases from Sun Tzu's The Art of War: "be like a wind in a rapid march, a woods in a steady march, a fire in a raid, a mountain in a standoff."

== Original version ==
The original version of the banner is mentioned in the Kōyō Gunkan, a record of the military exploits of the Takeda clan. It is based on four phrases from Sun Tzu, which in the original Chinese appear in two consecutive passages:

Chapter 7, passage 17: "故其疾如風，其徐如林" Let your rapidity be that of the wind, your gentleness that of the forest.

Chapter 7, passage 18: "侵掠如火，不動如山" In raiding and plundering be like fire, be immovable like a mountain.

== Four-character version ==
The four-character version (yojijukugo) appears to be a later invention. Historian Masaya Suzuki, citing the work of an authority on the military insignia of the time, argues that there is no evidence in the historical record for the four-character phrase, and that it became popular with the publication of a historical novel of the same name by Yasushi Inoue in 1953.

== Use in popular culture ==
Takeda Shingen and his "shadow" are the main characters of Akira Kurosawa's Kagemusha (1980). The battle standard and its message are prominent aspects of the film.

The character Ryu from the video game series Street Fighter has the Furinkazan on his belt as well as highly stylised versions of the Japanese characters on his gloves. The characters can also be seen to the left of the character's stage in the game Street Fighter II.

The mascot of Yamanashi Prefecture in Central Japan, a samurai Kai Ken dog named Takeda Hishimaru, carries a gunbai (war fan) with the four-character version of the phrase in homage to Takeda Shingen.

The character Sanada Genichirō, a tennis player with a kendo background from the manga series Prince of Tennis employs a set of techniques in his style of tennis named after the Furinkazan; "Fū" is an extremely fast swing that is based on a sword-drawing technique that makes the ball invisible to the eye, "Rin" is a slice that neutralizes the spin on the ball, "Ka" is an extremely powerful shot to overwhelm the opponent and "Zan" is Sanada's "Iron Wall of Defence" in a figurative sense, allowing him to return any ball the opponent may hit towards him.

Popular Japanese Enka singer Hachirō Kasuga included a song titled "Fuurinkazan" in his album "Byakko Kasuga Hachirou no Subete Original Hit Vol.3".

== See also ==
- Fūrin Kazan (TV series)
