= Matsui Munenobu =

Matsui Munenobu (松井 宗信, 1515 – June 12, 1560) was a Japanese samurai of the Sengoku period. He was also known as Matsui Gohachirō. Born the son of Matsui Sadamune, he was a retainer of the Imagawa clan. After the death of his brother in the year Eiroku-2 (1559), he became lord of Futamata Castle in Tōtōmi Province. The next year, he joined Imagawa Yoshimoto's army on its march to Kyoto, and was killed en route by Oda forces at the Battle of Okehazama in 1560.

His son, Munetsune, would go on to serve the Takeda Clan.

== Family ==
- Matsui Sadamune (Ja:松井貞宗): Father
- Matsui Nobushige (Ja:松井 信薫): Brother
- Matsui Munetsune (Ja:松井 宗恒): Son
