= Kaganoi Shigemochi =

Japanese samurai

Kaganoi Shigemochi (加賀井 重望; 1561 – August 27, 1600) was a Japanese samurai of the Azuchi-Momoyama period, who served the Oda clan. He ruled Kaganoi Castle in Mino Province. During the Battle of Komaki and Nagakute, Shigemochi fought under his father Shigemune, who was attached to the forces of Oda Nobukatsu. Soon after, Kaganoi Castle was surrounded by the forces of Toyotomi Hideyoshi; Shigemune surrendered, and Shigemochi was employed by Hideyoshi as a messenger, receiving a stipend of 10,000 koku. He also possessed a blade made by Muramasa, which Hideyoshi bestowed on him in 1598.

On 27 August 1600, a few days before the Battle of Sekigahara, Shigemochi was at a drinking party with Mizuno Tadashige and Horio Yoshiharu. Shigemochi killed Tadashige in a drunken rage, and was himself promptly killed by Yoshiharu. This worked to Tokugawa Ieyasu's favor, as Shigemochi (whose territory was in the path of Ieyasu's planned march) was close to Ishida Mitsunari. With Shigemochi's death, the Kaganoi family line became extinct.

== Notes ==
- (in Japanese) https://web.archive.org/web/20081012073920/http://wolfpac.press.ne.jp/daimyo02.html (5 August 2008)
