= Odai no Kata =

Mother of Tokugawa Ieyasu

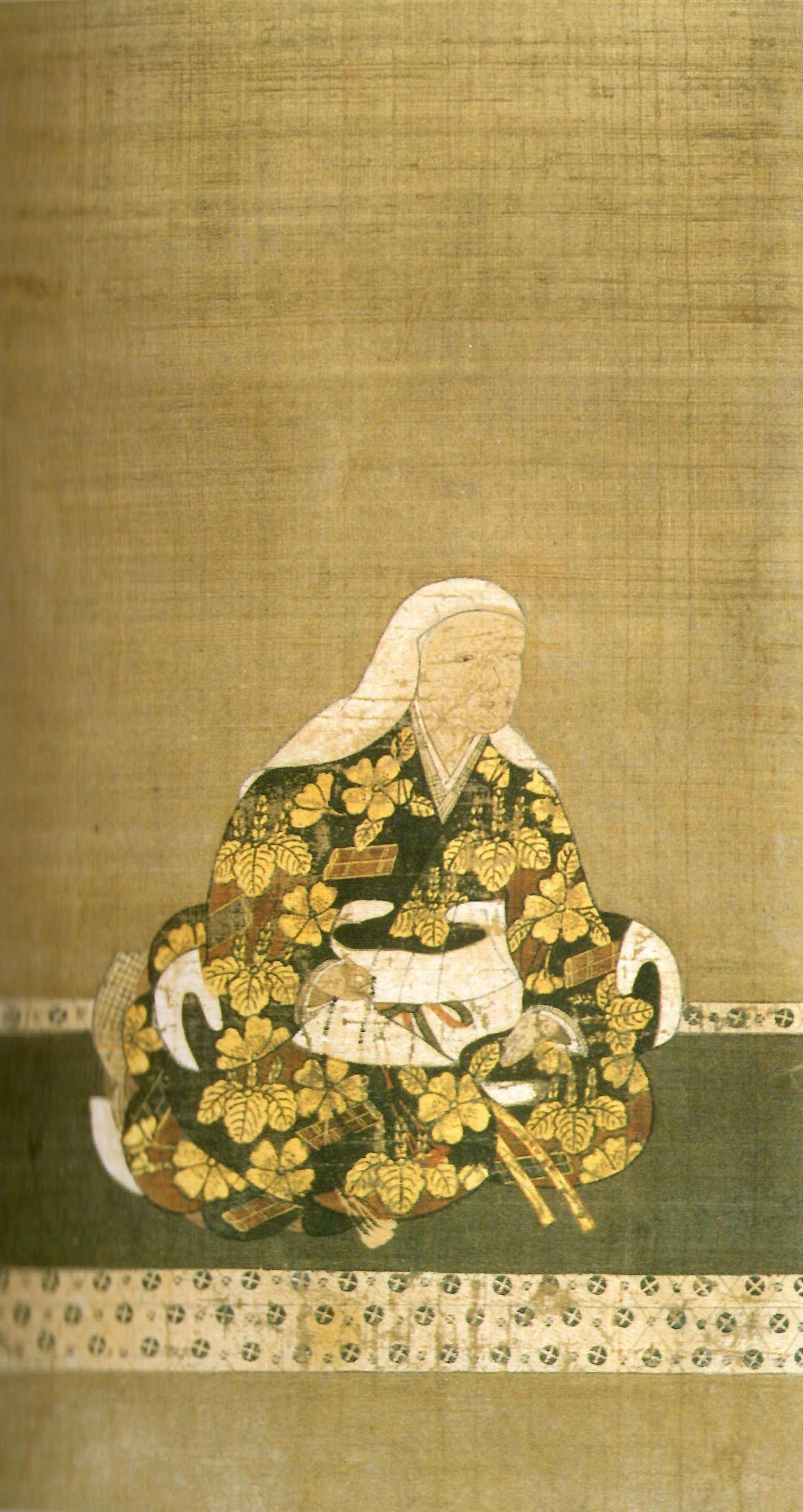
Odai no Kata portrait

Odai no Kata (於大の方, 1528–1602), also known as Dai, Daishi, and Denzûin, was a Japanese noblewoman from the Sengoku period.

She was the mother of Tokugawa Ieyasu, founder of the Tokugawa Shogunate. She was the daughter of Mizuno Tadamasa, the lord of Kariya Castle. She was married to Matsudaira Hirotada in 1541 and gave birth to Ieyasu two years later. After the Mizuno clan betrayed Hirotada in 1544, he divorced her and remarried.

== Biography ==
Odai was born in 1528 as the daughter of Mizuno Tadamasa in Ogawa (present-day Higashiura). Odai's older brother Mizuno Nobumoto, who succeeded the Mizuno clan after the death of Tadamasa, broke relations with the Imagawa clan, who was the master of the Matsudaira family, and followed Oda clan. In 1544, Odai was divorced by Hirotada, who worried about relations with the Imagawa family, and returned to Kariya Castle of the Mizuno family in Mikawa Province. In 1547, Odai remarried Toshikatsu, the lord of Agoya Castle in Chita-gun according to the wish of Nobumoto. Toshikatsu had married a daughter of the Mizuno clan, but did not have good relationship with the Mizuno family or the Matsudaira family after her death, and he strengthened relations with the Mizuno clan in his struggle against the Matsudaira family. She bore Toshikatsu three sons and three daughters. She maintained regular correspondence with Ieyasu during this time.

After the Battle of Okehazama, Ieyasu became independent from the Imagawa clan and allied with the Oda family, gave the family name Matsudaira to the three sons of Toshikatsu and Odai, made them his retainers, and welcomed Odai as his mother. Odai underwent tonsure and called herself Denzuin after the death of her husband, Toshikatsu.

In 1602, after the Battle of Sekigahara, she had an audience with the widow of Hideyoshi, Kodaiin and Emperor Goyozei, and visited Toyokuni-jinja Shrine in Kyoto to show that the Tokugawa clan had no hostility toward the Toyotomi clan. In the same year, she died in Fushimi Castle in Kyoto, where Ieyasu was staying. Her ashes were buried at Denzu-in Temple in Koishikawa, Edo. Her posthumous Buddhist name is Denzuinden Yoyokogaku Chiko Daizenjoni. Her family temples were built in various locations.

Odai's birthplace of Higashiura-cho constructed 'Odai Park' in Ogawa in her memory and holds an 'Odai Festivals' every year.

== Honours ==
- Junior First Rank (1850; posthumous)

== Sources ==
- Ishin Shiryô Kôyô 維新史料綱要, vol 1 (1937), 280.
