= Mizuno clan =

Japanese clan

Mizuno clan 水野
- (Mon) of the Mizuno clan
- Home province: Owari
- Parent house: Taira clan
- Titles: Various
- Founder: Mizuno Kiyofusa
- Final ruler: Mizuno Tadamoto
- Current head: Unknown
- Founding year: 14th century
- Dissolution: Still extant
- Ruled until: 1871 (Abolition of the han system)

The Mizuno clan, a prominent Japanese clan, held the esteemed positions of samurai and nobility. Throughout the tumultuous Sengoku period, they were the rulers of Kariya Castle in Mikawa Province, which also served as the ancestral home of Tokugawa Ieyasu's mother, Odai no Kata (Denzuin). Following the Battle of Okehaza, the Mizuno clan pledged their allegiance to Ieyasu and became one of the Fudai Daimyo during the Edo period. Known for their loyalty and service, the Mizuno clan played a significant role in the shogunate, often appointing senior members to key positions. Tadakuni Mizuno, in particular, gained widespread recognition for spearheading the Tenpo Reforms. The Mizuno family was one of the five families that continued to hold power until the abolition of domains and the establishment of prefectures in the early Meiji period. The other families included the Shimousa Yuki clan, the Kazusa Kikuma clan, the Kazusa Tsurumaki clan, the Omi Asahiyama clan, and the Kii-Shingu Domain, all of whom were chief retainers of the Kishu Domain. Following the implementation of the Peerage Ordinance, the Mizuno clan was granted the title of viscounts, while the retainers of the retainers were bestowed with the title of barons, solidifying their status within the Japanese nobility.

== History ==
The Mizuno clan's origins are documented in the "Kansei Chushū Shōka Kefu" as the Seiwa-Genji Yashima clan line. The military base was established by Minamoto no Mitsumasa, who served as the shogun of the base. Mitsumasa's 7th grandson, Shigefusa Ogawa, resided in Ogawa, Akugo, Owari Chita District, and identified himself as a member of the Ogawa clan. Shigefusa's son, Shigekiyo, lived in Kasugai District. It is believed that Shigekiyo temporarily resided in Mizunogo, which led to the adoption of the name Mizuno. In Mizuno-go, Kasugai District (Mizuno, Seto City), where the family name is associated with, there are various lineages such as Kanbuhei clan, Yoshikane line, Nagata clan, and the Mizuno clan. It is possible that there were marital connections between the Ogawa clan, the Mizuno clan, and the Minamoto clan. Another theory mentioned in the "Kanseifu" suggests that the Mizuno clan's alternate surname originated from the village of Mizuno in Saga, Kyoto. This theory states that the son of Michitsune Konoe, who held the position of Minister of the Right, resided in Mizuno-mura, Nishi-Sagano (Kazuno District), Yamashiro Province, and adopted the Mizuno family name. However, due to the early birth of Tomoshige, the son of Ogawa Shigekiyo, he was adopted by Kiyofusa and the family name was changed accordingly. This tradition is believed to be one of the reasons why the Mizuno clan later became known as the Konoe family of the Fujiwara Kita family. Subsequently, Kiyofusa Masatsune's son, was appointed as the headman of Ogawa, Abigo, and served as a gokenin and land steward in Ogawa, Chita District until the era of Masafusa.

== Muromachi Period ==
The Mizuno clan's rise to power can be traced back to the Sengoku period in the mid-15th century. It was during this time that Mizuno Sadamori, the 14th generation of the Ogawa clan, constructed Ogawa Castle in Owari Province. This marked the beginning of the clan's expansion, as they also established Kariya Castle in Aoumi District, Mikawa Province. These two strongholds, situated across the Sakaigawa River and the Aizuma River, served as the foundation for the Mizuno clan's growing influence. As the Mizuno clan continued to assert their power, they found themselves engaged in rivalries with other prominent clans in the region. They competed with the Saji clan in Ono, Chita District, and the Toda clan in Atsumi District. In addition to Ogawa Castle and Kariya Castle, the Mizuno clan came to possess several other castles, including Otaka Castle, Tokoname Castle, Kamezaki Castle, Miyazu Castle, and Washizuka Castle. These strategic strongholds further solidified their control and allowed them to exert their influence over the surrounding territories. Under the leadership of Mizuno Tadamasa, the head of the Mizuno clan, the family took control of Ogawa Castle and Kariya Castle. This marked a significant milestone, as these were the first castles to be held by the clan since Sadamori's time. With their power base secured, the Mizuno clan expanded their territory by moving southward to the Chita Peninsula. This move put pressure on the Saji and Toda clans, while also allowing the Mizuno clan to oppress the Kira clan of Nishio Castle in Mikawa. During this period, the Mizuno clan enjoyed a close relationship with the Imagawa clan and the Matsudaira clan, who were based in the nearby area. Intermarriage between the Mizuno and Matsudaira clans was common, and the Mizuno clan's influence rivaled that of the powerful Matsudaira clan. The Mizuno clan held a position of equal power to the Matsudaira clan during this particular era. As a result of this prevailing trend, Tokugawa Ieyasu's mother, Dentsuin, who happened to be the daughter of Mizuno Tadamasa, was transferred to the Matsudaira clan.

== Orimizu Alliance and Destruction ==
Following Tadamasa's demise, his second son, Mizuno Nobumoto, assumed control. However, he deviated from his previous pro-Imagawa stance and instead forged an alliance with Oda Nobuhide, known as the Omizu Alliance. This shift in allegiance had significant consequences, particularly for Nobumoto's sister, Odai, who was married to Matsudaira Hirotada, the patriarch of the Matsudaira family and father of Tokugawa Ieyasu. As a result of the alliance, Odai divorced Hirotada and returned to Kariya, where she resided in the Shiinoki mansion near Kariya Castle for several years until her marriage into the Hisamatsu family. However, the alliance between the Matsudaira clan and the Mizuno clan was primarily led by Hirotada's uncle, Matsudaira Nobutaka, who served as Hirotada's guardian. Due to conflicts and disagreements, Nobutaka was ostracized by Hirotada and other senior vassals. This strained the relationship between the Mizuno clan, which had been collaborating with Nobutaka, and the Matsudaira clan. Consequently, there are theories suggesting that the alliance could not be sustained. Additionally, Mizuno Nobumoto, being a samurai situated on the border between the Imagawa clan and the Oda clan, occasionally aligned himself with the Imagawa side when the Imagawa clan expanded into Nishi-Mikawa. This occurred around 1551 when Nobumoto assumed leadership of the Mizuno clan and aimed to regain control over Chita County. Furthermore, there is evidence indicating that the Tokoname Mizuno clan, a branch of the Mizuno clan, maintained communication with the Imagawa clan even after these events took place.

== See also ==
- Japanese name
- Japanese clans
