= Okabe Motonobu =

Samurai (d. 1581)

Okabe Motonobu (岡部 元信, d. April 25, 1581), also known as Naganori, was a Japanese samurai of the Sengoku period, in the service of the Imagawa clan. The second son of Okabe Chikatsuna, he became a senior retainer of the Imagawa, following in his father's footsteps.

In 1560, after his lord Imagawa Yoshimoto was killed at the Battle of Okehazama, he kept fighting and even retrieved his lord's corpse. Following the clan's collapse, he switched his allegiance to the Takeda clan and defended Takatenjin Castle.

In 1581, he died in the Siege of Takatenjin against Honda Tadakatsu when he and his troops were attacked by Tokugawa Ieyasu's forces.
