= Siege of Takatenjin (1581) =

Second siege of the castle

Second Siege of Takatenjin
- Part of the Sengoku period
Date	1580 - March 22, 1581
Location	Takatenjin fortress, Tōtōmi Province, Japan 34°41′54″N 138°02′07″E
Result	Siege succeeds; Oda-Tokugawa victory
Territorial changes	Fortress falls to Oda-Tokugawa

Belligerents
forces loyal to Takeda Katsuyori	forces loyal to Oda Nobunaga and Tokugawa Ieyasu

Commanders and leaders
Okabe Motonobu †	Tokugawa Ieyasu; Honda Tadakatsu; Matsudaira Ietada (Fukōzu); Ii Naomasa; Mizuno Tadashige; Mizuno Katsushige

Strength
1,000 men	5,000 men

Casualties and losses
680 killed	130 killed
- Location within Shizuoka Prefecture Siege of Takatenjin (1581) (Japan)

The second siege of Takatenjin began only six years after Takeda Katsuyori had taken the fortress. Lasting from 1580 until 22 March 1581, the siege ended within four months and resulted in the deaths of 680 of Okabe Motonobu's garrison.

== Siege ==
Positions of the Takatenjin Castle and the six forts 1.Ogasayama Fort, 2.Nogasaka Fort, 3.Higamine Fort,4. Shishigahana Fort, 5.Nakamura Fort, 6.'Mitsuiyama Fort, 7.Takatenjin Castle

In 1580, during the conflict between Tokugawa clan against Takeda clan, Tokugawa Ieyasu built up around five fortresses in order to isolate the Takatenjin castle from external supplies and reinforcements. Those new fortresses consisted of:

- Higamine fort located 1,5 km northeast of Takatenjin castle.
- Shishigahana Fort located 3 kilometers east of Takatenjin Castle.
- Nakamura Fort located 3 kilometers southeast of Takatenjin Castle
- Mitsuiyama Fort located 3 kilometers south of Takatenjin Castle.
- Nogasaka Fort located 2 kilometers north-northeast of Takatenjin Castle.

In addition of those 5 new fortresses, Ieyasu renovated an old castle located 4 km north of Takatenjin castle. This castle was named Ogasayama fort, which was originally built by Ieyasu far before during the conquest of Tōtōmi Province against Imagawa clan to capture Kakegawa Castle. As these six fortresses were completed, Ieyasu assigned Ishikawa Yasumichi to garrison the Ogasayama fort, Honda Yasushige to garrison Nogasaka fort, Osuga Yasutaka to garrison Higamine fort, Shishigahana Fort & Nakamura Fort, while Sakai Ietada was appointed to garrison Mitsuiyama fort.

With the completion of those cluster of castles which referred as "six fortress of Takatenjin", the Takatenjin castle which defended by Okabe Motonobu immediately suffered starvations as they deprived any sources or supply to sustain the population inside the castle, while the siege outside the castle by Oda-Tokugawa forces intensified. In response, Motonobu tried to negotiate truce with Ieyasu by offering Takisakai Castle and Koyama Castle to be given for Ieyasu in exchange that Takatenjin castle spared from the siege. However, Oda Nobunaga refused the plea from Motonobu.

== Battle ==
On January 3, 1581, Ieyasu was informed that a force under the command of Takeda Katsuyori was approaching. Oda Nobunaga got the same information and immediately sent Oda reinforcements led by Mizuno Tadashige.

In March 1581, Takatenjin Castle ran out of food, and the castle's soldiers ate plants to survive hunger. Motonobu decided that he should break the siege and gave a party with his remaining soldiers at night before they went out to try to launch an assault against Ieyasu's blockade. Shortly after 10 pm. on March 22, Motonobu led his remaining soldiers in an assault on Mitsuiyama fort, which was defended by Ishikawa Yasumichi, as it was considered to be the weakest fortress among the six Tokugawa blockade fortresses. However, as they launched the attack towards Mitsuiyama, Yasumichi was immediately reinforced by Ōkubo Tadayo and Osuga Yasutaka, which resulted in a fierce battle, where Motonobu was killed. Meanwhile, as the battle phased out with the army of Motonobu routed, Ōkubo Tadataka led a detachment to pursue any fleeing enemies.

== Aftermath ==
The siege was quite advantageous for Oda Nobunaga, as it significantly weakened his enemy, the Takeda clan; the Battle of Tenmokuzan the following year would come to be known as Takeda Katsuyori's last stand and the fall of the distinguished Takeda of Kai.

According to the Shinchō Kōki by Ōta Gyūichi, "in all, 688 soldiers of various rank joined the commander of the castle in a desperate attack out onto the besiegers, and they were killed".

In Matsudaira Ietada (Fukōzu)'s diary Ietada nikki, he wrote that; "among our own we lost about 130 in total, while the enemy lost more than 600".

== Appendix ==
=== Bibliography ===
- Rekishi Gunzo Editorial Department (2007). 戦国驍将・知将・奇将伝 ― 乱世を駆けた62人の生き様・死に様 [Sengoku Generals, Chishos, and Strange Shoguns: The lives and deaths of 62 people who lived through turbulent times] (in Japanese). 学習研究社.

== See also ==
- Siege of Takatenjin (1574)
