= Takeda Katsuyori =

Japanese warlord (1546–1582)

- 武田 勝頼
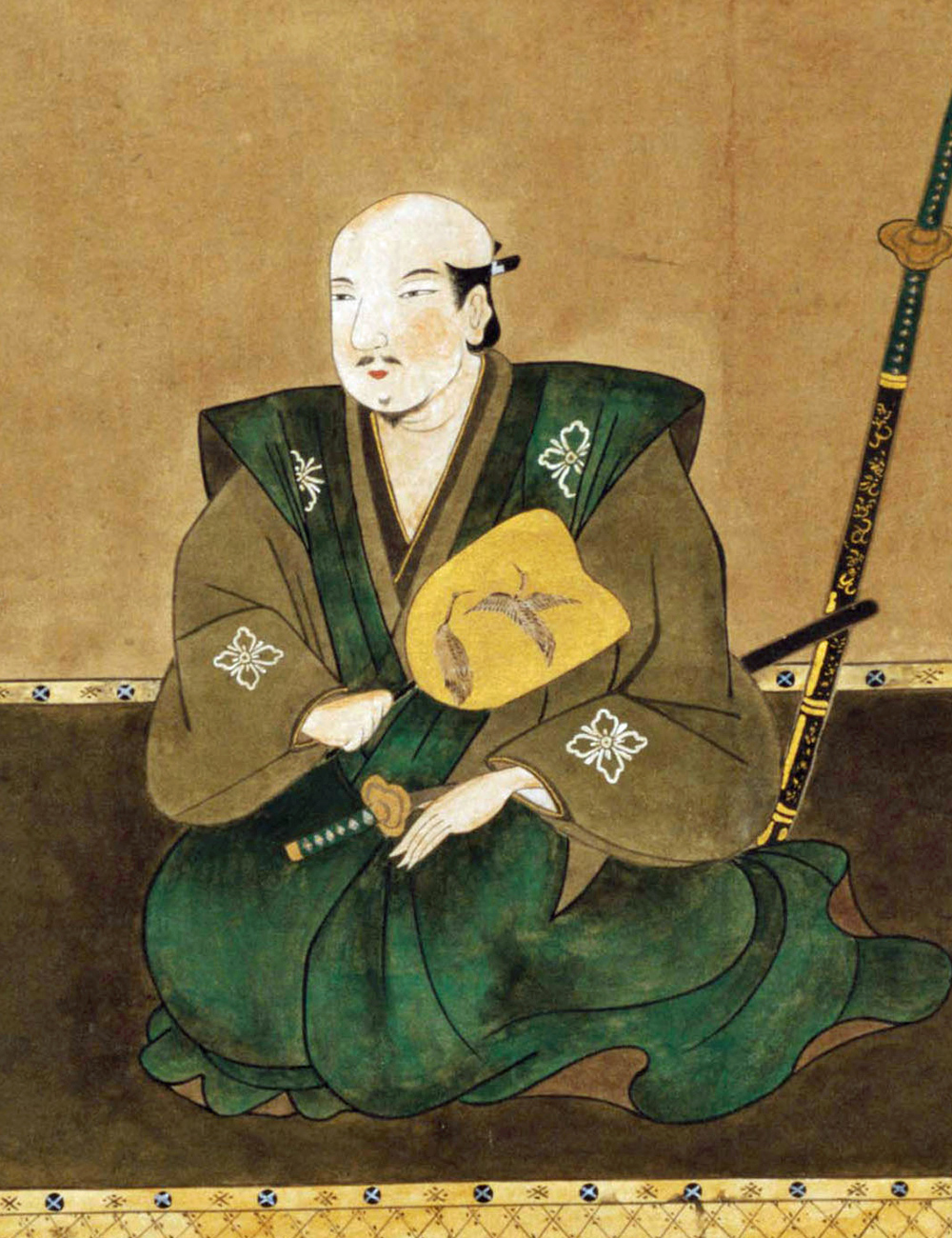

Head of Takeda clan
- In office 1573–1582
- Preceded by: Takeda Shingen

Personal details
- Born: 1546 Kai Province
- Died: 11 March 1582 (aged 35–36) Tenmoku Mountain, Kai Province
- Spouse(s): Toyama Fujin; Keirin'in
- Children: Takeda Nobukatsu; Takeda Katsuchika; Tei-hime; Kougu-hime
- Parents: Takeda Shingen (father); Suwa Goryōnin (mother)
- Relatives: Takeda Yoshinobu (brother); Takeda Nobuchika (brother); Nishina Morinobu (brother); Hōjō Ujiyasu (father-in-law)

Military service
- Allegiance: Suwa clan Takeda clan
- Rank: Daimyo
- Commands: Shinpu Castle
- Battles/wars: Siege of Kanbara; Siege of Futamata; Battle of Mikatagahara; Siege of Takatenjin; Siege of Yoshida; Battle of Nagashino; Battle of Omosu; Battle of Tenmokuzan †

Takeda Katsuyori (武田 勝頼; 1546 – 11 March 1582) was a Japanese daimyō (military lord) of the Sengoku period, who was famed as the head of the Takeda clan and the successor to the legendary warlord Takeda Shingen. He was son-in-law of Hojo Ujiyasu, daimyō of Hojo clan.

== Early life ==
He was the son of Shingen by the daughter of Suwa Yorishige (posthumous name: Suwa-goryōnin (諏訪御料人; real name, Koihime)). Shingen led a campaign to take Suwa territory in 1542 and defeated Yorishige, who later committed suicide. Shingen took Yorishige's daughter as a concubine. Katsuyori's children included Takeda Nobukatsu and Katsuchika.

Katsuyori, first known as Suwa Shirō Katsuyori (諏訪四郎勝頼), succeeded to his mother's Suwa clan and gained Takatō Castle as the seat of his domain.

After his elder brother Takeda Yoshinobu died, Katsuyori's son Nobukatsu became heir to the Takeda clan, making Katsuyori the de facto ruler of the Takeda clan. Takeda Katsuyori built Shinpu Castle, a new and larger castle at Nirasaki and transferred his residence there in 1581.

== Military life ==
In 1569, Katsuyori defeated Hojo Ujinobu at Siege of Kanbara

In 1572, Katsuyori successfully took a Tokugawa clan possession in the Siege of Futamata, and participated in the Battle of Mikatagahara against the Oda-Tokugawa alliance.

In 1573, Katsuyori took charge of the Takeda family after the death of Shingen and fought the Tokugawa clan.

In 1574, he captured Takatenjin castle, which even his father had not managed to do. This gained him the support of other members of the Takeda clan.

In 1575, he suffered a major loss at the Battle of Nagashino, defeated by one of the earliest recorded uses of volley fire by Oda Nobunaga's 3,000 muskets, and losing a large part of his forces as well as a number of Takeda's generals and retainers.

In 1578, Katsuyori incurred the wrath of the Hōjō family by helping Uesugi Kagekatsu against Uesugi Kagetora who was Hōjō Ujiyasu's seventh son, adopted by and heir to Uesugi Kenshin, leading to the Battle of Omosu in 1580 against Hojo Ujimasa.

In 1581, Katsuyori lost Takatenjin fortress to Tokugawa Ieyasu. The siege ended with the deaths of 680 men of Okabe Motonobu's garrison.

In 1582, Katsuyori lost Takatō castle to Oda Nobutada, the only Takeda stronghold in Shinano province to put up any resistance to Nobunaga's final invasion of Takeda domain. The castle was taken on March the 2nd 1582.

== Death ==
After Katsuyori lost Takatenjin fortress and Takatō castle, many clans like Kiso and Anayama withdrew their support for Takeda. The Oda-Tokugawa alliance advanced into Kai Province, and laid siege to Shinpu Castle. Katsuyori was unable to hold the castle with his remaining 300-400 men, so he set fire to Shinpu Castle and fled into Tenmoku mountain. Later, his forces were destroyed by the combined armies of Oda Nobunaga and Tokugawa Ieyasu at the Battle of Tenmokuzan, after which Katsuyori, his wife, and his son committed seppuku. It was the end of Takeda clan.

The nun Rikei wrote an account of his wife's suicide and, pitying them, wrote several verses in their honour.

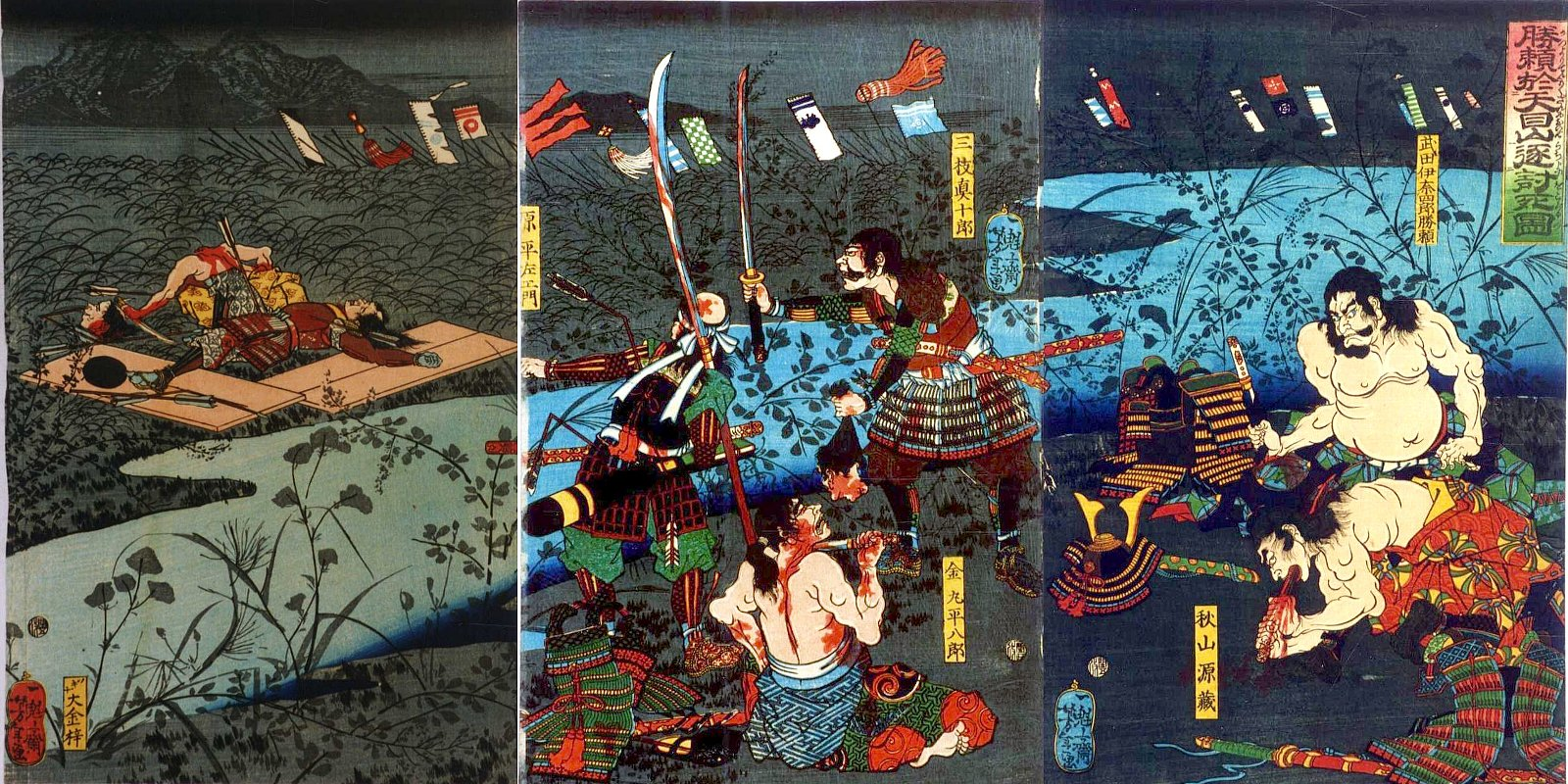
Ukiyoe of Takeda Katsuyori at Tenmokuzan

== Spouse ==
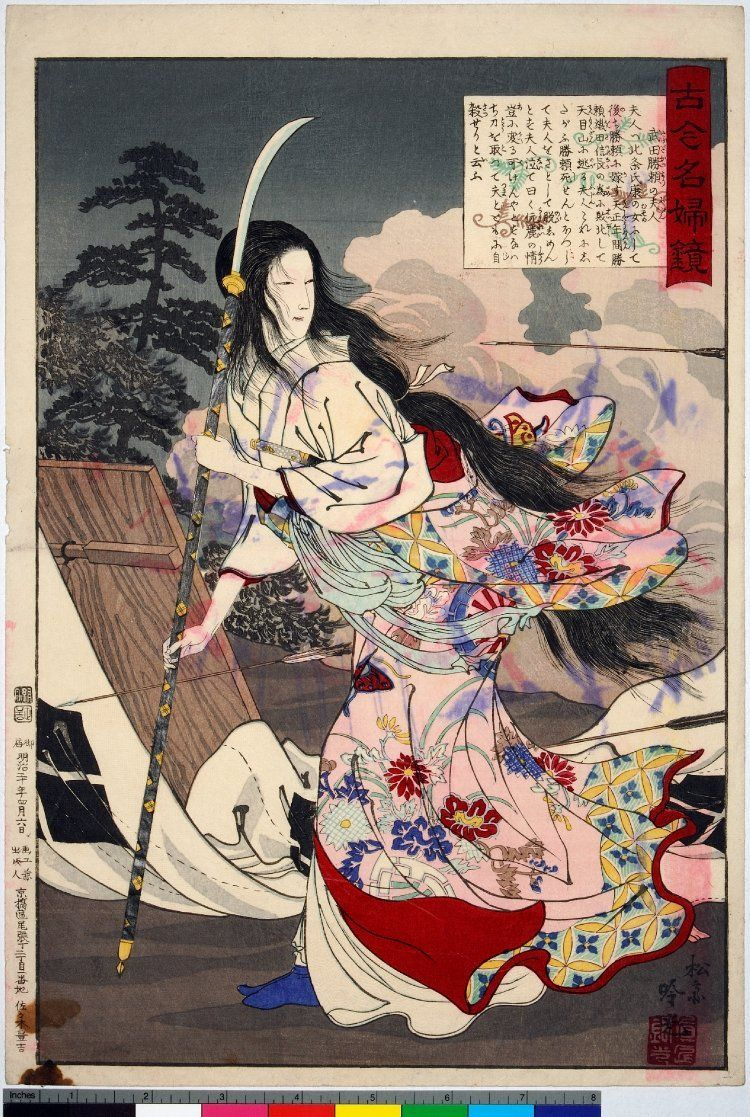
Keirin'in (Katsuyori's wife) carrying a naginata in the Battle of Tenmokuzan.

=== Toyama Fujin ===
Takeda Katsuyori married Toyama Fujin, the adopted daughter of Oda Nobunaga. She died while giving birth to their son Nobukatsu in 1567.

=== Keirin'in ===
Katsuyori later married Keirin'in, daughter of Hojo Ujiyasu. They had a son and two daughters. In 1582, when Keirin'in was 19, Katsuyori was decisively defeated by Oda Nobunaga, and they had to flee. However, Katsuyori was resigned to die and urged her to leave him. She refused and killed herself (jigai), along with Katsuyori in the Battle of Tenmokuzan. Both of his sons died in the battle.

== Family ==
Father: Takeda Shingen (1521–1573)

Sons:

- Takeda Nobukatsu (1567–1582)
- Takeda Katsuchika (1580–1582)

Wives:

- Toyama Fujin
- Keirin'in

Daughters:

- Tei-hime, married Miyahara Yoshihisa
- Kougu-hime, married Naitō Tadaoki
