= Siege of Takatenjin (1574) =

Coordinates: 34.6983°N 138.0347°E

First Siege of Takatenjin
- Part of the Sengoku period
Date	1574
Location	Takatenjin fortress, Tōtōmi Province, Japan
Result	Siege succeeds; Takeda victory
Territorial changes	Fortress falls to the Takeda

Belligerents
forces loyal to the Takeda family	forces of Tokugawa Ieyasu

Commanders and leaders
Takeda Katsuyori	Ogasawara Nagatada (surrendered)

Strength
25,000	11,000

The first siege of Takatenjin was a military battle that occurred in May 1574, when it was attacked by the forces of Takeda Katsuyori. The garrison was commanded by Ogasawara Nagatada, who held the fortress for Tokugawa Ieyasu.

The siege ended in the capture of Takatenjin Castle by Takeda Katsuyori, moving control of the stronghold from the Tokugawa clan to the Takeda clan.

== History ==
In the 1570s, Tōtōmi province was a border area between the territories of the Takeda and the Tokugawa clan.

Takeda Shingen died in 1573. His son, Takeda Katsuyori succeeded him as leader of the Takeda clan. Takeda had previously attempted to capture Takatenjin Castle but he was unsuccessful. In May 1574, Katsuyori launched a campaign targeting that same location.

Takatenjin castle was a yamashiro situated on Mount Tsurugabu. It contained steep terrain, cliffs and multiple defensive enclosures.

== Events ==
Takeda forces surrounded the base of Mount Tsurugabu to cut off supply lines and communication to the castle. Tokugawa Ieyasu called for assistance from his ally Oda Nobunaga. However, the forces were involed in military actions somewhere else, and no external forces arrived to relieve the fortress. As resources ran out, Ogasawara Nagatada gave up the castle to Katsuyori. In return, Nagatada was given new land in Suruga Province and joined the Takeda group.

== See also ==
- Siege of Takatenjin (1581)
