= 1582 =

1582 in various calendars
- Gregorian calendar: 1582; MDLXXXII
- Ab urbe condita: 2335
- Armenian calendar: 1031; ԹՎ ՌԼԱ
- Assyrian calendar: 6332
- Balinese saka calendar: 1503–1504
- Bengali calendar: 988–989
- Berber calendar: 2532
- English Regnal year: 24 Eliz. 1 – 25 Eliz. 1
- Buddhist calendar: 2126
- Burmese calendar: 944
- Byzantine calendar: 7090–7091
- Chinese calendar: 辛巳年 (Metal Snake); 4279 or 4072 — to — 壬午年 (Water Horse); 4280 or 4073
- Coptic calendar: 1298–1299
- Discordian calendar: 2748
- Ethiopian calendar: 1574–1575
- Hebrew calendar: 5342–5343
- Hindu calendars
- Vikram Samvat: 1638–1639
- Shaka Samvat: 1503–1504
- Kali Yuga: 4682–4683
- Holocene calendar: 11582
- Igbo calendar: 582–583
- Iranian calendar: 960–961
- Islamic calendar: 989–990
- Japanese calendar: Tenshō 10 (天正１０年)
- Javanese calendar: 1501–1502
- Julian calendar: Gregorian minus 10 days
- Korean calendar: 3915
- Minguo calendar: 330 before ROC 民前330年
- Nanakshahi calendar: 114
- Thai solar calendar: 2124–2125
- Tibetan calendar: ལྕགས་མོ་སྦྲུལ་ལོ་ (female Iron-Snake); 1708 or 1327 or 555 — to — ཆུ་ཕོ་རྟ་ལོ་ (male Water-Horse); 1709 or 1328 or 556

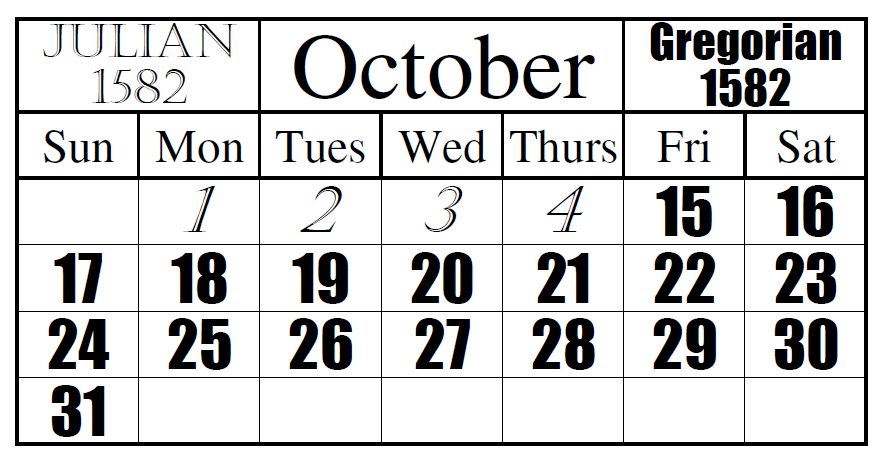
October 15: The day after October 4, 1582, is designated October 15 by order of Pope Gregory XIII

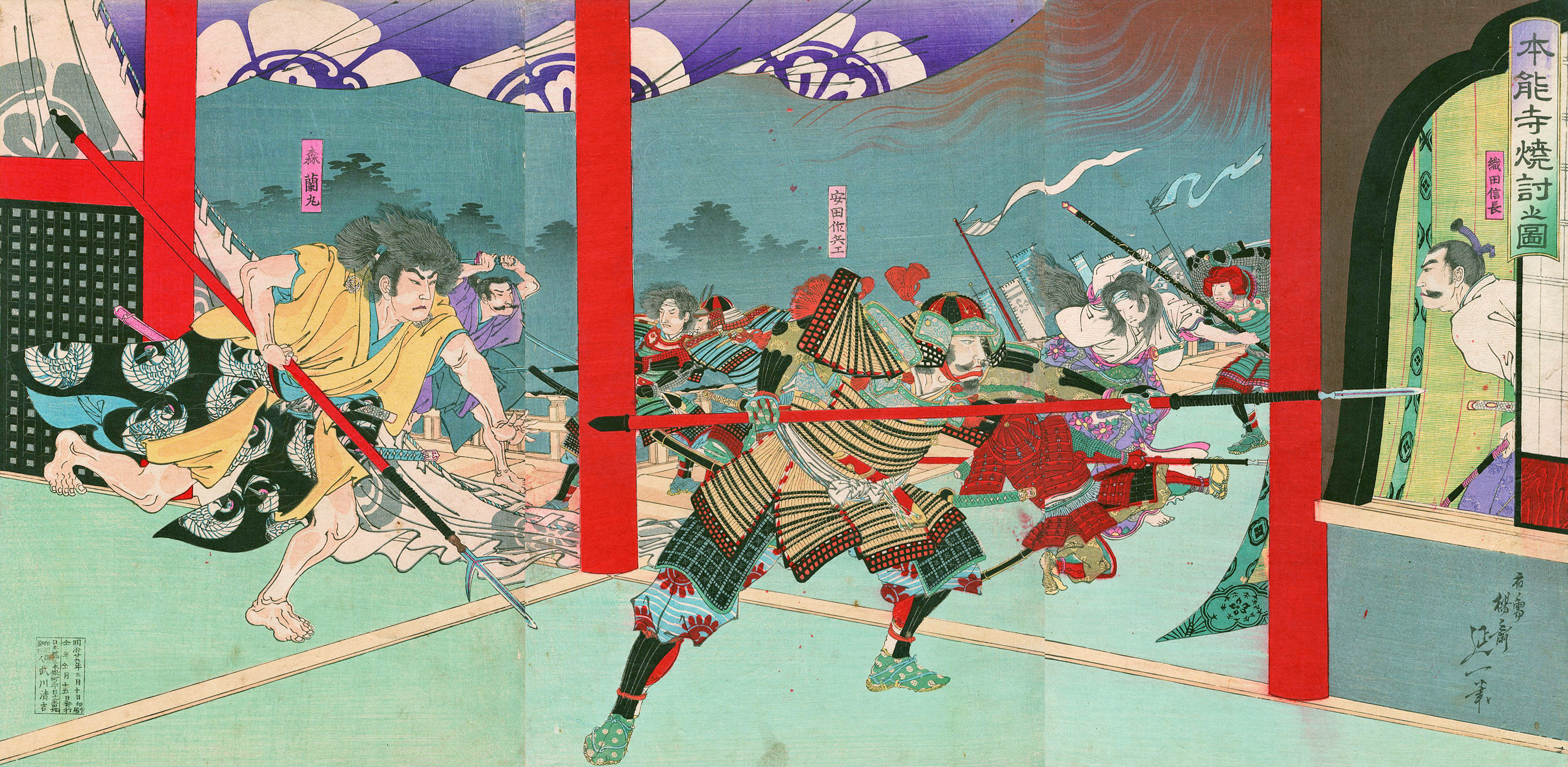
June 21: Japanese warlord Oda Nobunaga assassinated in "incident at Honnō-ji"

1582 (MDLXXXII) was a common year starting on Monday in the Julian calendar, and a common year starting on Friday (link will display full calendar) of the Proleptic Gregorian calendar. This year saw the beginning of the Gregorian calendar switch, when the papal bull Inter gravissimas introduced the Gregorian calendar, adopted by Spain, Portugal, the Polish–Lithuanian Commonwealth and most of present-day Italy from the start. In these countries, the year continued as normal through Thursday, October 4; the next day became Friday, October 15, like a common year starting on Friday. France followed two months later, letting Sunday, December 9 be followed by Monday, December 20. Other countries continued using the Julian calendar, switching calendars in later years, and the complete conversion to the Gregorian calendar was not entirely done until 1923.

== Events ==
=== January–March ===
- January 2 – The University of Würzburg is refounded.
- January 15 – Russia cedes its conquered areas in Livonia (Northern Latvia and Southern Estonia), to the Polish–Lithuanian Commonwealth.
- February 10 – François, Duke of Anjou, arrives in the Netherlands, where he is personally welcomed by William the Silent.
- February 24 (Julian) (March 6 Gregorian) – Pope Gregory XIII proclaims the Gregorian calendar, to come into effect in October. Under the order, the date on the Julian calendar will be advanced by 10 days in order to synchronize the calendar date back to the equinoxes and solstices, since the gap has been increasing by one day every 100 years since the 6th century and is 10 days off schedule.
- March 9 – Scryer Edward Kelley arrives at John Dee's house in London. They practice angelic magic together and Dee develops the Enochian language.
- March – The New Testament of the Douai Bible, the translation into English by Father Gregory Martin from Latin of the New Testament, for use in the Roman Catholic Church, is published. Martin had started his work on October 16, 1578.

=== April–June ===
- April 2 – 1582 Ancuancu earthquake: Ancuancu (in modern-day La Paz Department, Bolivia) is struck by an earthquake that reportedly buries all of the inhabitants, except for one chief, who reportedly loses the ability to speak. On the place where the village had stood, the Jacha Kalla (Achocalla) valley is formed as a result of the earthquake.
- April 3 – Battle of Temmokuzan: Unable to reverse the collapse of Takeda clan, Takeda Katsuyori and his household commit suicide.
- April 14 – King James VI of Scotland signs a charter creating the Tounis College, which becomes the University of Edinburgh.
- April 16 – Spanish conquistador Hernando de Lerma founds the settlement of Salta, Argentina.
- April 17 – Siege of Takamatsu: In Japan, Toyotomi Hideyoshi departs from the Himeji Castle in the modern-day Hyōgo Prefecture and begins his march westward with 20,000 soldiers to the Bitchū Province in the modern-day Okayama Prefecture. Along the way, he stops at the Kameyama Castle where he makes a rendezvous with the Ukita clan and 10,000 additional forces before proceeding toward the Takamatsu Castle.
- May 17 – The Siege of Takamatsu begins as Hideyoshi attacks the forces of Shimizu Muneharu, who has twice as many soldiers. Hideyoshi orders an engineering project to block the Ashimori River and divert its waters to flood Takamatsu Castle.
- June 8 – Siege of Takamatsu: Heavy rains and the dikes built by Hideyoshi's forces turn the area around Takamatsu Castle into a lake.
- June 21 – (2nd day of the sixth month, Tenshō 10) The Honnō-ji Incident occurs in Kyoto in Japan, as Japanese warlord Oda Nobunaga, on the verge of unifying Japan under his rule, is assassinated following a betrayal by a rebel subject, Akechi Mitsuhide.
- June 23 – Shimizu Muneharu surrenders Takamatsu Castle to Toyotomi Hideyoshi and, in return for the pledge that the castle's defenders will be spared, commits the ritual suicide of seppuku.

=== July–September ===
- July 2 – Battle of Yamazaki: Counterattacking forces led by Toyotomi Hideyoshi decisively defeat Akechi Mitsuhide's smaller army; Akechi is killed while retreating to his domain.
- July 26 – Battle of Ponta Delgada (War of the Portuguese Succession): Spanish admiral Santa Cruz decisively defeats a larger mercenary fleet from France, England, supporters of the Portuguese claimant António, Prior of Crato, and the Dutch Republic, under Filippo di Piero Strozzi (who is killed) off the Azores, the first engagement between large fleets of galleons, operating at any great distance from the mainland.

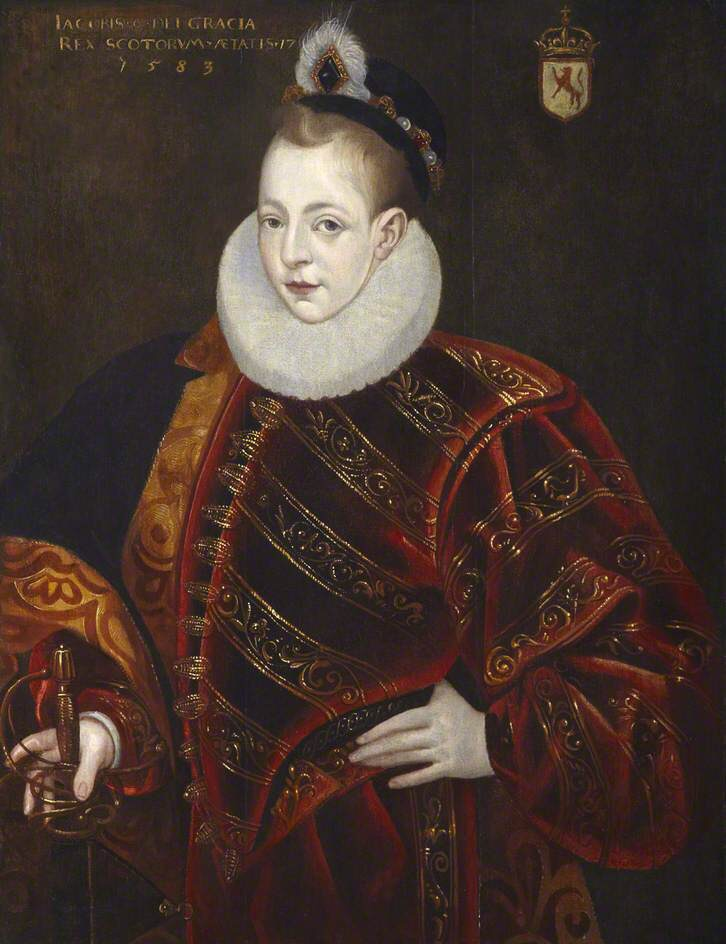
Young King James, taken hostage

- August 23 – Raid of Ruthven in Scotland: Presbyterian nobles led by William Ruthven, 1st Earl of Gowrie kidnap King James VI of Scotland, the kingdom's 16-year-old ruler, while he is hunting in Perthshire. The Earl of Gowrie imprisons the King at Ruthven Castle as part of a coup d'etat to reform the Scottish government.
- September 28 – Ruthven and his co-conspirators arrange for John Maxwell, 8th Lord Maxwell, heir to former regent James Douglas, 4th Earl of Morton, to be installed as Scotland's regent. Douglas had been executed in 1581 for the 1567 murder of Henry Stuart, Lord Darnley, husband of Mary, Queen of Scots, and father of King James VI, who is imprisoned at Ruthven's castle.

=== October–December ===
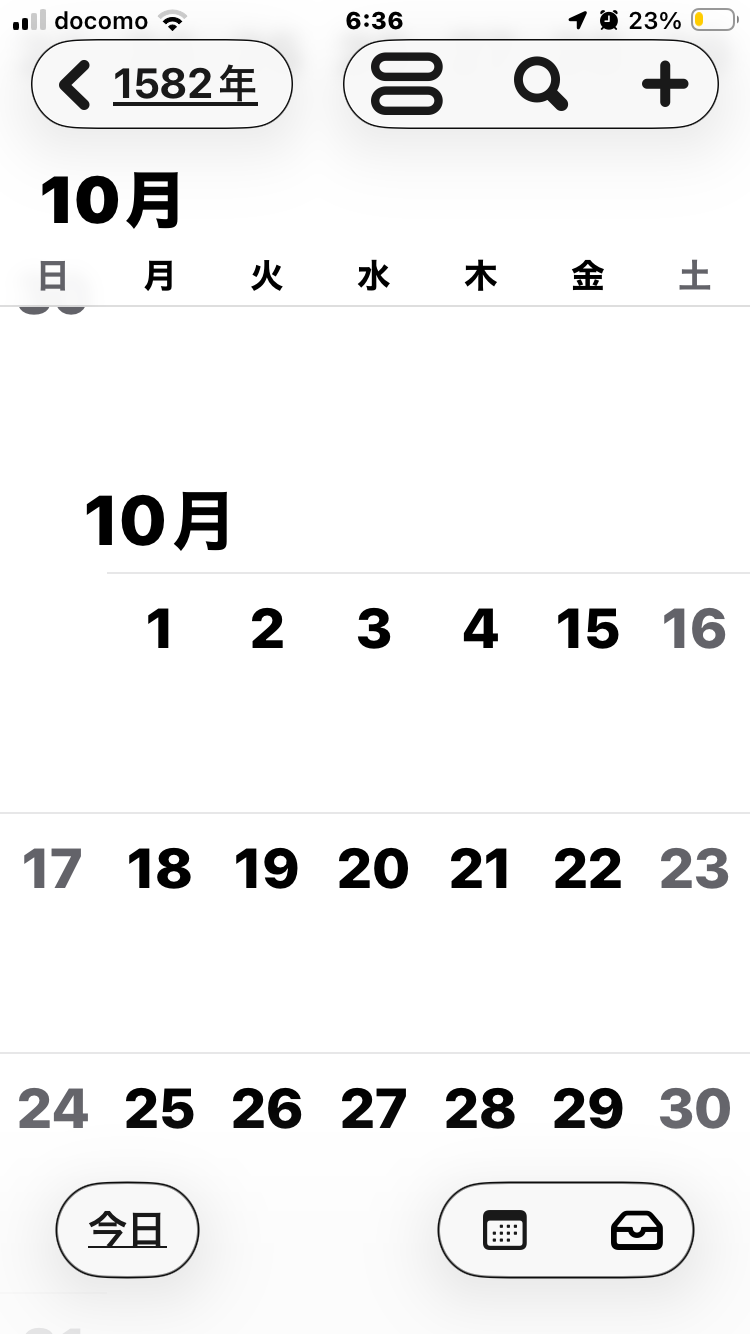
Year 1582 Oct. calendar on a Japanese iPhone showing the ten day skip implemented during the transition from Julian calendar to Gregorian calendar

- October 4 (Julian) (October 14 Gregorian) – The Julian calendar is discarded at the end of the day in Italy, Poland, Portugal, and Spain as Pope Gregory XIII implements the Gregorian calendar. In the nations where the calendar is accepted, Thursday, October 4 is followed the next day by Friday, October 15.
- October 26 (Julian) (November 5 Gregorian) – General Yermak Timofeyevich completes the Russian conquest of Siberia in the Battle of Chuvash Cape as Kuchum Khan abandons Qashliq, the capital of the Khanate of Sibir. The Qashliq fortress will be torn down and a new town, Tobolsk will be built 11 miles (18 km) further up the Irtysh river.
- November 29 – Ten years before he begins writing his first known plays, William Shakespeare, 18 years old, marries pregnant 26-year-old Anne Hathaway in England.
- December 9 (Julian) (December 19 Gregorian) – France discards the Julian Calendar at the end of the day and adopts the Gregorian Calendar at midnight. Sunday, December 9 is followed the next day in France by Monday, December 20.

=== Date unknown ===
- The temple complex of Kumbum is founded in Tibet.
- In Ming dynasty China:
  - Jesuit Matteo Ricci is allowed to enter the country.
  - The earliest reference is made to the publishing of private newspapers in Beijing.
- The sultanate of Morocco begins to press southward, in search of a greater share of the trans-Saharan trade.
- The Cagayan battles in the Philippines, the only recorded clashes between Spanish regular soldiers and samurai warriors.

== Births ==
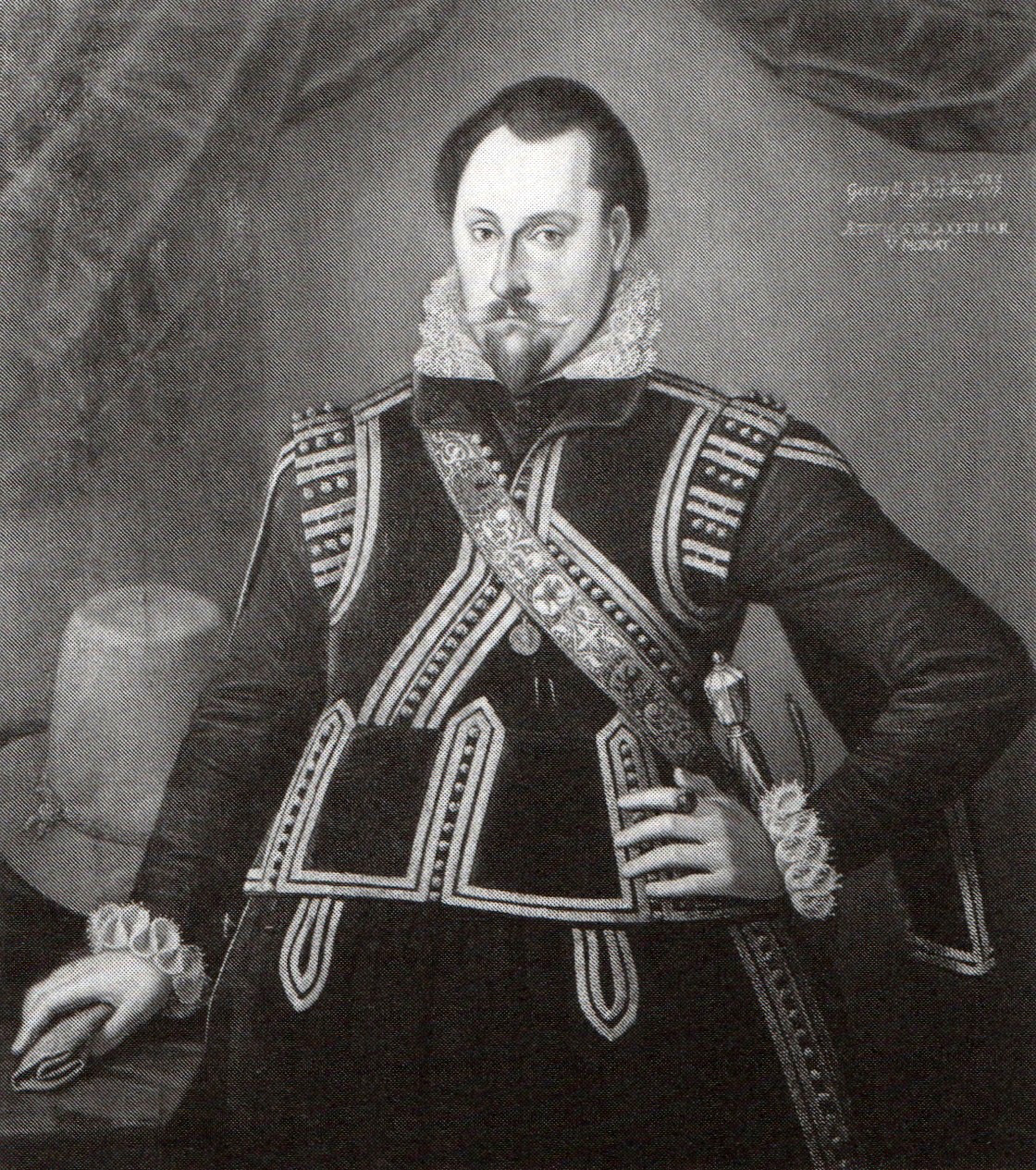
George II, Duke of Pomerania

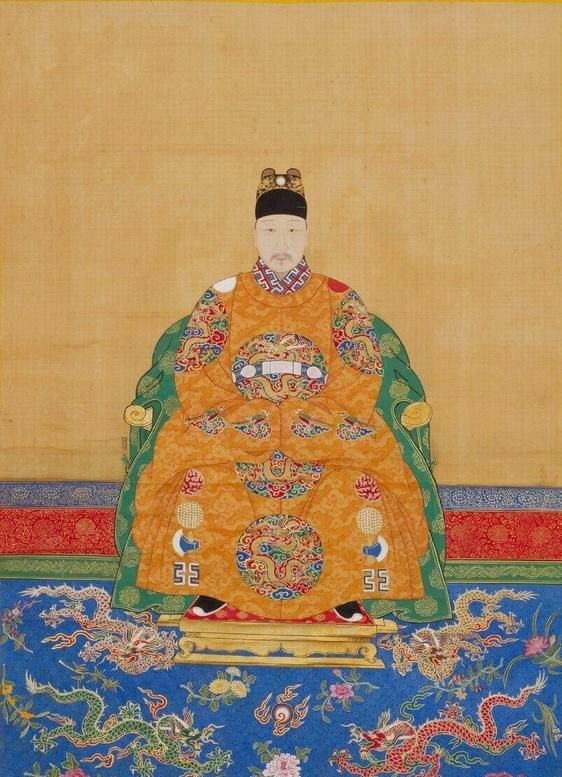
Taichang Emperor

- January 6
  - Alonso de Contreras, Spanish privateer and writer (d. 1641)
  - Jaroslav Borzita of Martinice, Bohemian noble (d. 1649)
- January 7 – Magdalene of Brandenburg, Landgravine consort of Hesse-Darmstadt (1598–1616) (d. 1616)
- January 26 – Giovanni Lanfranco, Italian painter (d. 1647)
- January 28 – John Barclay, Scottish satirist and Latin poet (d. 1621)
- January 30 – George II, Duke of Pomerania (d. 1617)
- February 8 – Matthias Bernegger, German philologist (d. 1640)
- February 17 – George, Duke of Brunswick-Lüneburg (d. 1641)
- February 22 – John Ratcliffe, English politician and soldier (d. 1627)
- March 15
  - Daniel Featley, English theologian and controversialist (d. 1645)
  - Deodat del Monte, Flemish painter, architect (d. 1644)
- March 22 – John Williams, Welsh clergyman and political advisor to King James I (d. 1650)
- March 31 – Duchess Sophie of Prussia, Duchess consort of Courland (1609–1610) (d. 1610)
- April 8 – (bapt.) Phineas Fletcher, English poet (d. 1650)
- April 11 – Justus de Harduwijn, Dutch Catholic priest and poet (d. 1636)
- May 1 – Marco da Gagliano, Italian composer of the early Baroque era (d. 1643)
- May 5 – John Frederick, Duke of Württemberg (1608–1628) (d. 1628)
- June 26 – Johannes Schultz, German composer (d. 1653)
- June 28 – William Fiennes, 1st Viscount Saye and Sele, English nobleman and politician (d. 1662)
- July 27 – Sir John Isham, 1st Baronet, English Member of Parliament (d. 1651)
- August 11 – Sabina Catharina of East Frisia, Countess of Rietberg (1586–1618) (d. 1618)
- August 17 – John Matthew Rispoli, major Maltese philosopher of great erudition (d. 1639)
- August 26 – Humilis of Bisignano, Italian Franciscan friar and saint (d. 1637)
- August 27 – Maria Amalia of Nassau-Dillenburg, German noble (d. 1635)
- August 28
  - Taichang Emperor, of the Ming Dynasty of China (d. 1620)
  - Hans Meinhard von Schönberg, German military commander (d. 1616)
- September 25 – Archduchess Eleanor of Austria (d. 1620)
- September 26 – Eitel Frederick von Hohenzollern-Sigmaringen, German Catholic cardinal (d. 1625)
- October 2 – Augustus, Count Palatine of Sulzbach, Count Palatine of Neuburg (1614–1632) (d. 1632)
- October 17 – Johann Gerhard, Lutheran church leader (d. 1637)
- October 19 – Dmitri Ivanovich, Russian Tsarevich (d. 1591)
- October 21 – John Ernest of Nassau-Siegen, German general (d. 1617)
- October 22 – Francesco Piccolomini, Italian Jesuit (d. 1651)
- November 2 – Elizabeth Jane Weston, English Czech poet (d. 1612)
- November 21 – François Maynard, French poet (d. 1646)
- November 27 – Pierre Dupuy, French historian (d. 1651)
- November 30 – Anselm Casimir Wambold von Umstadt, Archbishop of Mainz (d. 1647)
- December 10 – William Chappell, Irish bishop (d. 1649)
- December 16 – Robert Bertie, 1st Earl of Lindsey, English adventurer and soldier (d. 1642)
- December 23 – Severo Bonini, Italian composer (d. 1663)
- date unknown
  - Giovanni Francesco Abela, Maltese writer (d. 1655)
  - Giulio Alenio, Italian Jesuit missionary (d. 1649)
  - Gregorio Allegri, Italian composer (d. 1652)
  - John Bainbridge, English astronomer (d. 1648)
  - Richard Corbet, English poet and bishop (d. 1635)
  - William Juxon, Archbishop of Canterbury (d. 1663)
  - Thomas Moulson, Lord Mayor of London (d. 1638)
  - David Teniers the Elder, Flemish painter (d. 1649)
  - Francis Windebank, English politician (d. 1646)
  - Jacomina de Witte, politically influential Dutch woman (d. 1661)
  - Jakub Zadzik, Polish nobleman and diplomat (d. 1642)
- probable – Sigismondo d'India, Italian composer (d. 1629)

== Deaths ==
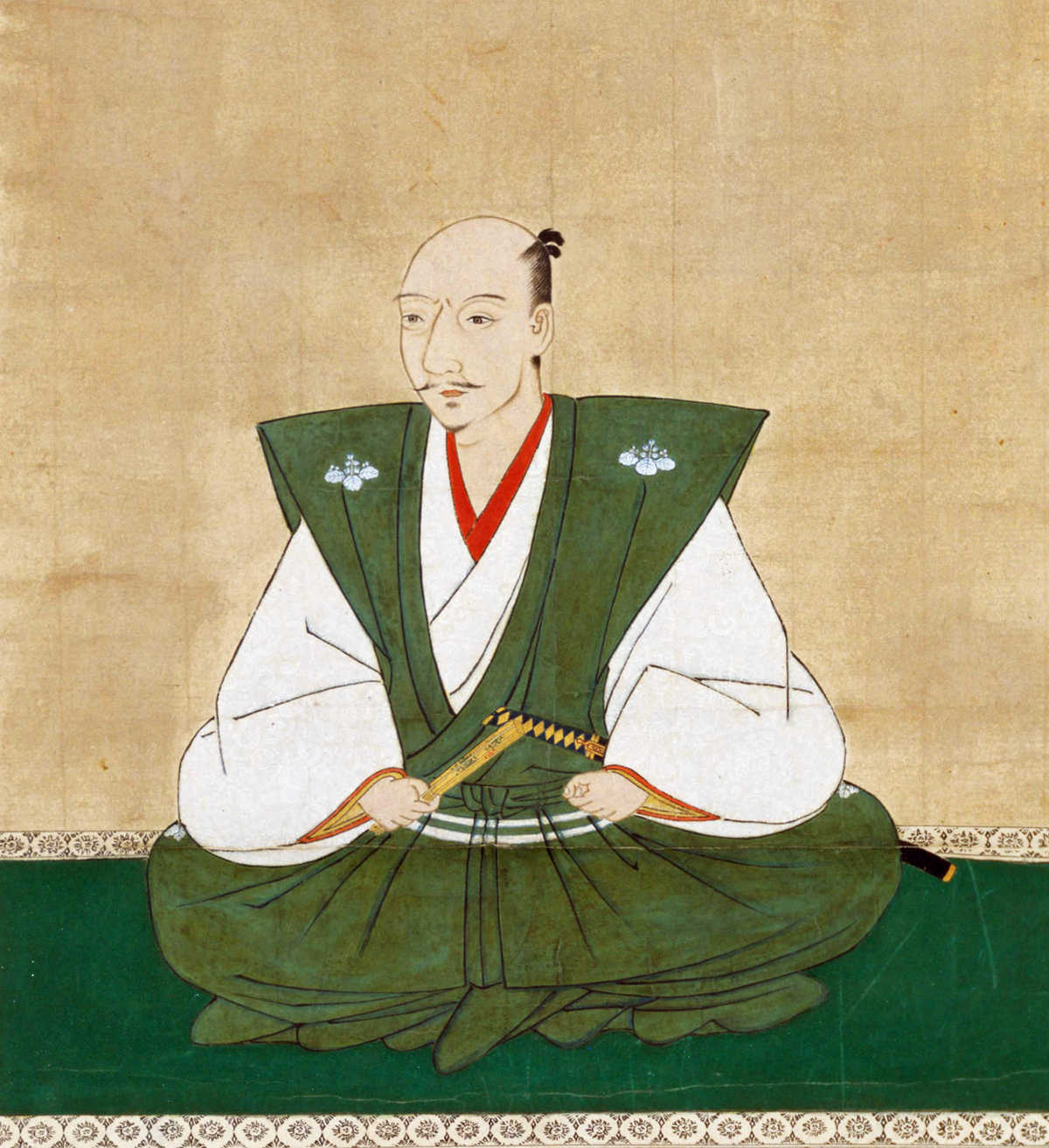
Oda Nobunaga

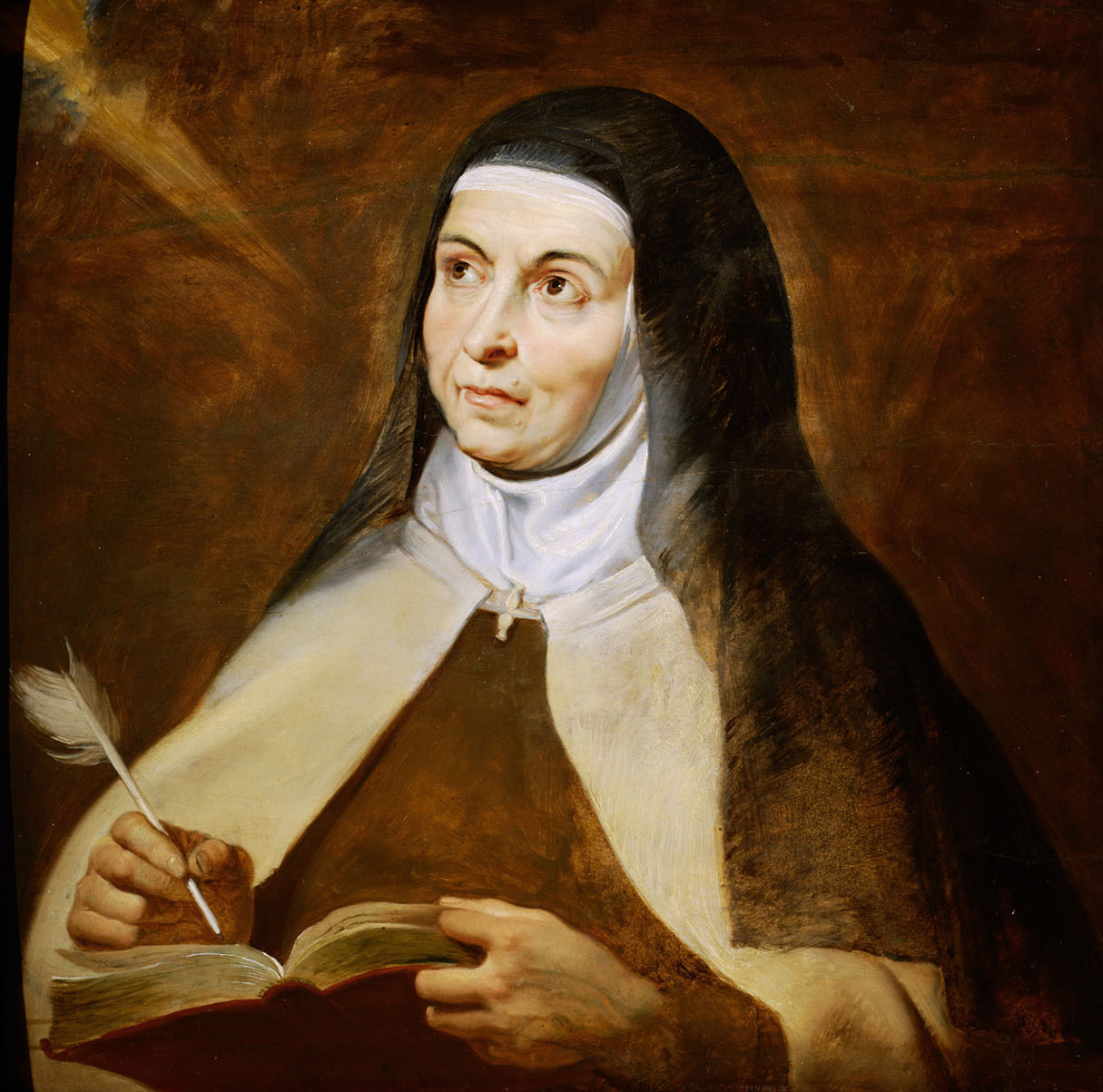
Saint Teresa of Avila

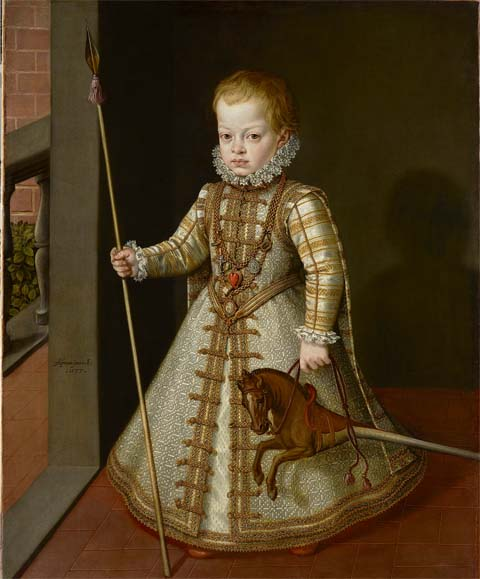
Diego, Prince of Asturias

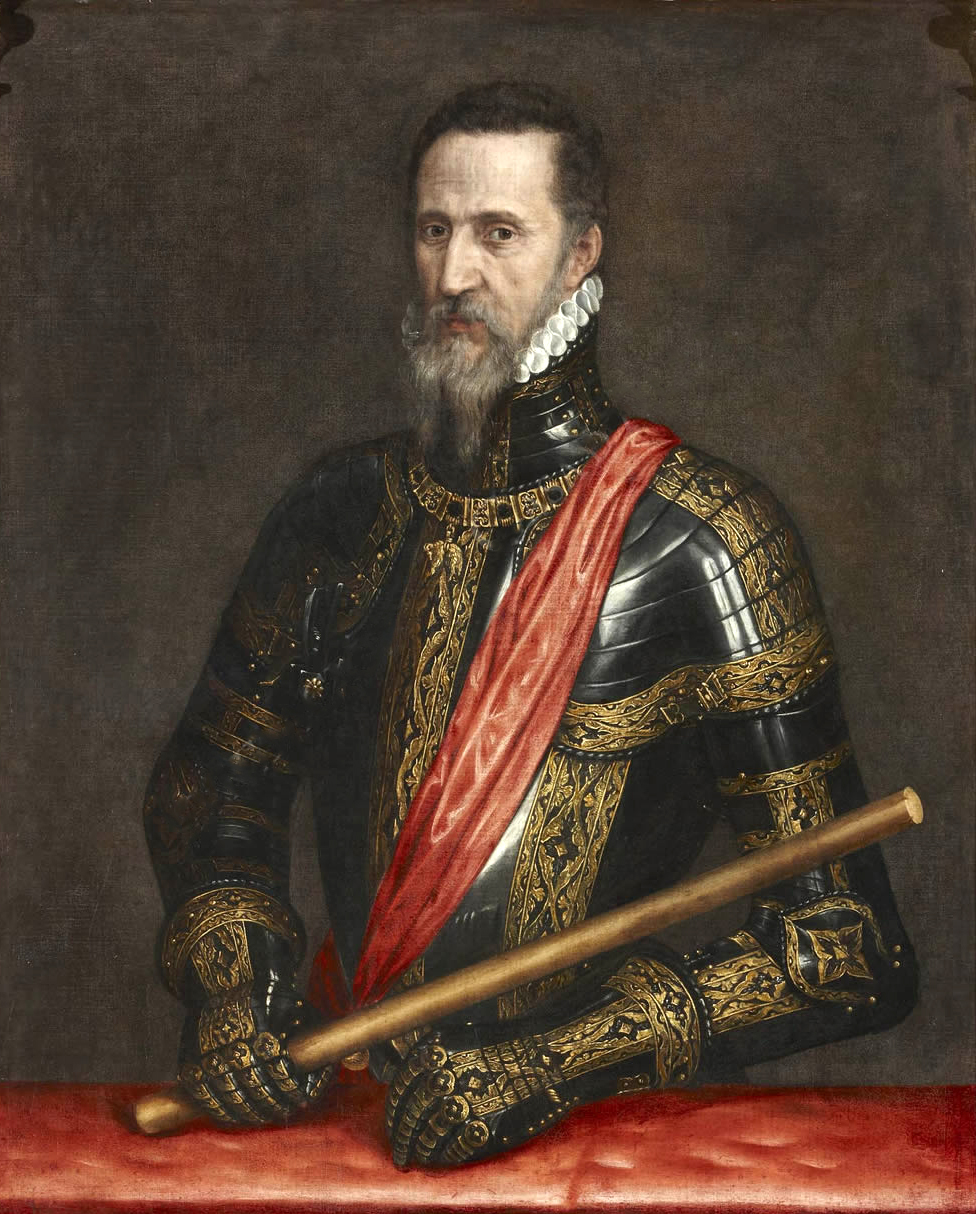
Fernando Álvarez de Toledo

- January 23 – Jean Bauhin, French physician (b. 1511)
- January 26 – Thomas Platter, Swiss humanist scholar (b. 1499)
- February 1 – Ukita Naoie, Japanese daimyō of Ukita clan. (b. 1529
- February 18 – Sakuma Nobumori, Japanese retainer and samurai (b. 1528)
- March 14 – Elisabeth of Hesse, Electress Palatine by marriage (1576-1582) (b. 1539)
- March 18 – Juan Jauregui, attempted assassin of William I of Orange (b. 1562)
- March 22 – Daniel Brendel von Homburg, Roman Catholic archbishop (b. 1522)
- March 29 – Philip de' Medici, Italian noble, Grand Prince of Tuscany (b. 1577)
- April 3 – Takeda Katsuyori, Japanese daimyō of Takeda Clan (b. 1546)
- April 16 – Oyamada Nobushige, Japanese samurai (b. 1545)
- April 21 – Francisco de Toledo, Spanish soldier and politician (b. 1515)
- May 3 – Giorgio Mainerio, Italian composer (b. 1530)
- May 5 – Charlotte of Bourbon, Princess consort of Orange, married to William I of Orange (b. 1547)
- June 13 – Matteo Tafuri, Italian alchemist (b. 1492)
- June 21
  - Oda Nobunaga, Japanese daimyō of the Oda Clan (b. 1534) (forced suicide)
  - Oda Nobutada, Japanese samurai, oldest son of Nobunaga (b. 1557) (forced suicide)
  - Anayama Nobukimi, Japanese military commander (b. 1541)
- June 23 – Shimizu Muneharu, Japanese military commander (b. 1537)
- July 2 – Akechi Mitsuhide, Japanese samurai and warlord (b. 1528)
- July 3 – James Crichton, Scottish scholar (b. 1560)
- July 7 – Kawajiri Hidetaka, Japanese samurai (b. 1527)
- July 17 – Jacques Peletier du Mans, French mathematician (b. 1517)
- September 23 – Louis, Duke of Montpensier (b. 1513)
- September 28 – George Buchanan, Scottish humanist scholar (b. 1506)
- October 4 – Teresa of Ávila, Spanish Carmelite nun, poet and saint (b. 1515)
- October 21 – Laurent Joubert, French physician (b. 1529)
- November 21 – Diego, Prince of Asturias, Portuguese prince (b. 1575)
- December 11 – Fernando Álvarez de Toledo, 3rd Duke of Alba, Spanish general (b. 1507)
- Date unknown:
  - Wu Cheng'en, Chinese novelist and poet of the Ming dynasty
  - Hans Hendrik van Paesschen, Flemish architect (b. 1510)
  - Zhang Juzheng, Ming dynasty official (b. 1525)
  - Takeda Nobukado, Japanese samurai (b. 1529)
  - Sen Soulintha, Laotian king of Lan Xang (b. 1511)
