= 1529 =

1529 in various calendars
- Gregorian calendar: 1529; MDXXIX
- Ab urbe condita: 2282
- Armenian calendar: 978; ԹՎ ՋՀԸ
- Assyrian calendar: 6279
- Balinese saka calendar: 1450–1451
- Bengali calendar: 935–936
- Berber calendar: 2479
- English Regnal year: 20 Hen. 8 – 21 Hen. 8
- Buddhist calendar: 2073
- Burmese calendar: 891
- Byzantine calendar: 7037–7038
- Chinese calendar: 戊子年 (Earth Rat); 4226 or 4019 — to — 己丑年 (Earth Ox); 4227 or 4020
- Coptic calendar: 1245–1246
- Discordian calendar: 2695
- Ethiopian calendar: 1521–1522
- Hebrew calendar: 5289–5290
- Hindu calendars
- Vikram Samvat: 1585–1586
- Shaka Samvat: 1450–1451
- Kali Yuga: 4629–4630
- Holocene calendar: 11529
- Igbo calendar: 529–530
- Iranian calendar: 907–908
- Islamic calendar: 935–936
- Japanese calendar: Kyōroku 2 (享禄２年)
- Javanese calendar: 1447–1448
- Julian calendar: 1529; MDXXIX
- Korean calendar: 3862
- Minguo calendar: 383 before ROC 民前383年
- Nanakshahi calendar: 61
- Thai solar calendar: 2071–2072
- Tibetan calendar: ས་ཕོ་བྱི་བ་ལོ་ (male Earth-Rat); 1655 or 1274 or 502 — to — ས་མོ་གླང་ལོ་ (female Earth-Ox); 1656 or 1275 or 503

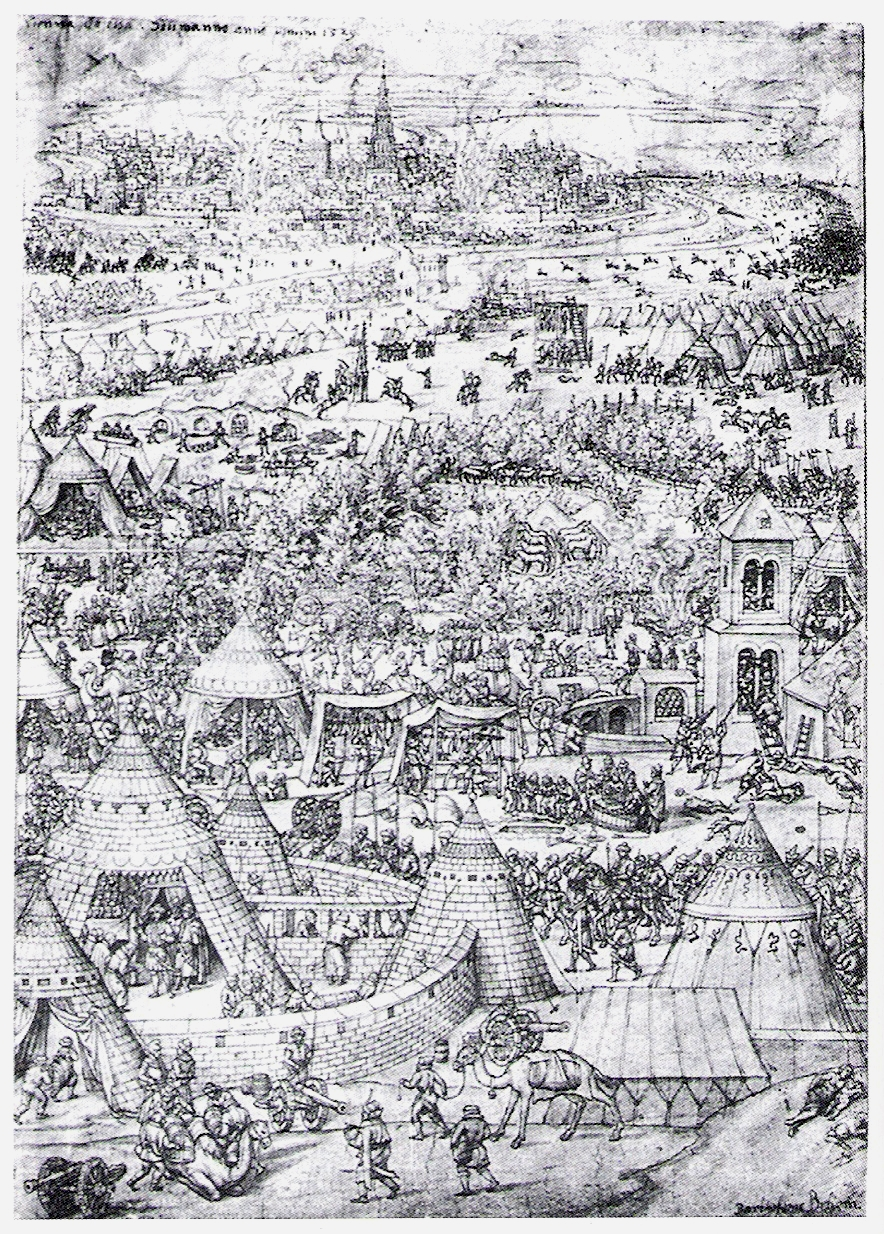
September 23: The Siege of Vienna starts.

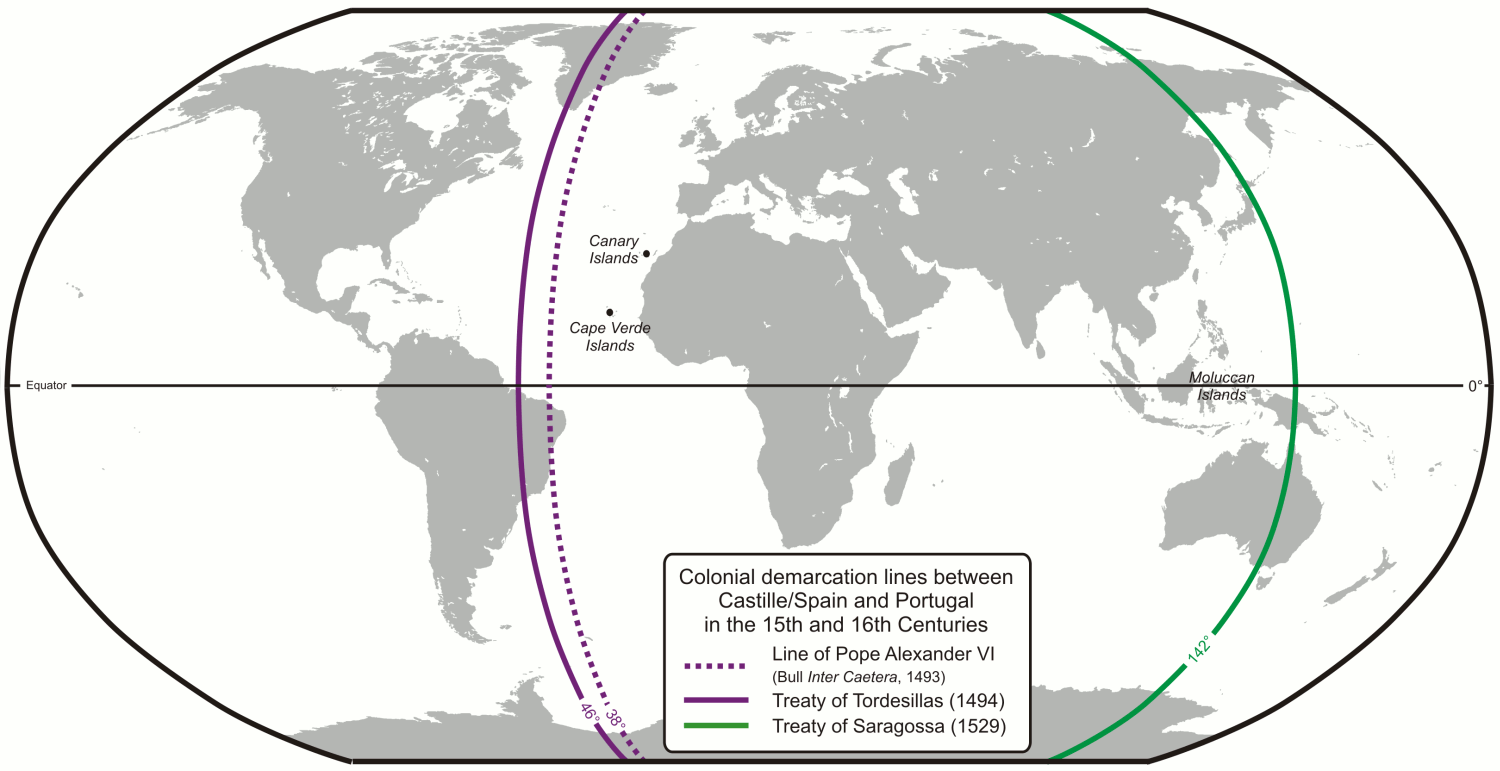
April 22: The Treaty of Zaragoza is signed, dividing the Portuguese and Spanish Empires

Year 1529 (MDXXIX) was a common year starting on Friday of the Julian calendar.

== Events ==
=== January–March ===
- January 6 – Basarab VI is installed as the new Prince of Wallachia (now in Romania) in the capital at Târgoviște, days after the assassination of the Voivode Radu of Afumați by the other boyars (Wallachian nobles). Basarab's reign lasts only a month and he is removed on February 5.
- January 8 – Zhang Qijie becomes the most powerful woman in Ming dynasty China as the primary wife of the Jiajing Emperor, shortly after the death of the Empress Xiaojiesu.
- January 20 – In India, the Mughal Emperor Babur departs from the capital at Agra toward Ghazipur to fight the Rajputs and the rebel Afghans who had captured the city.
- January 28 – Peter Vannes, the Italian-born envoy for England's King Henry VIII, arrives in Rome on a mission to get Pope Clement VII to give a dispensation for King Henry to divorce one wife and marry another, with both marriages to be declared valid. The mission fails.
- February 2 – The Örebro Synod provides the theological foundation of the Swedish Reformation, following the economic foundation of it, after the Reduction of Gustav I of Sweden.
- March 9 – The Battle of Shimbra Kure is fought in Ethiopia as the Imam Ahmad ibn Ibrahim al-Ghazi, with 12,000 men, including special forces armed with matchlock firearms, defeats the 200,000 man army of the Emperor Dawit II.
- March 25 – A blood libel is carried out against the Jewish community of Bosen in Hungary (now Pezinok in Slovakia), on the first day of Passover, after a boy in the town disappears. Three Jews are accused and killed. The boy is later discovered alive, having been kidnapped for the benefit of the scheme.

=== April–June ===
- April 8 – The Flensburg Disputation is held, a debate attended by Stadtholder Christian of Schleswig-Holstein (later King Christian III of Denmark), between Lutherans (led by Hermann Fast) and the more radical Anabaptists (led by Melchior Hoffman). Johannes Bugenhagen, a close associate of Martin Luther, presides. The Disputation marks the rejection of radical ideas by the Danish Reformation.
- April 9 – The Westrogothian rebellion breaks out in Sweden.
- April 19 – Diet of Speyer: A group of rulers (German: Fürst) and independent cities (German: Reichsstadt) protest the reinstatement of the Edict of Worms, beginning the Protestant movement.
- April 22 – The Treaty of Zaragoza divides the eastern hemisphere between the Spanish and Portuguese empires, stipulating that the dividing line should lie 297.5 leagues or 17° east of the Moluccas.
- May 10 – The Ottoman army under Suleiman I leaves Constantinople, to invade Hungary once again.
- May 31–July – Cardinal Thomas Wolsey, Archbishop of York, opens a legatine court at Blackfriars, London, to rule on the legality of King Henry VIII of England's marriage to Catherine of Aragon. The court lasts until July 16.
- June 21 –
  - War of the League of Cognac – Battle of Landriano: French forces in northern Italy are decisively defeated by Spain.
  - King Henry VIII and Queen consort Catherine of Aragon appear in person before the Blackfriars court, with Catherine making a pathetic display before the court and her husband, and the king making a speech about his uneasiness about his marriage.

=== July–September ===
- July 23 – The Blackfriars court is adjourned after word is received that Pope Clement VII has revoked its charter.
- July 30 – The only continental outbreak of English sweating sickness reaches Lübeck, spreading from there into Schleswig-Holstein in the next few months.
- August 5 – Charles V, Holy Roman Emperor, and Francis I of France sign the Treaty of Cambrai, or Ladies' Peace in the War of the League of Cognac: Francis abandons his claims in Italy, but is allowed to retain the Duchy of Burgundy. Henry VIII of England accedes on August 27.
- September 1 – Sancti Spiritu, the first European settlement in Argentina, is destroyed by local natives.
- September 8
  - Buda is recaptured by the invading forces of the Ottoman Empire.
  - The city of Maracaibo, Venezuela is founded by Ambrosius Ehinger.
- September 27 – Vienna is besieged by the Ottoman Turks commanded by Suleiman the Magnificent.

=== October–December ===
- October 15 – With the season growing late, Suleiman abandons the Siege of Vienna (a turning point in the Ottoman wars in Europe).
- October 26 – Cardinal Thomas Wolsey falls from power in England, due to his failure to obtain an annulment of Henry VIII's marriage and to prevent Habsburg expansion in Europe. Thomas More succeeds him as Lord Chancellor.
- November 4 – The English Reformation Parliament is first seated.
- December 17 – The first session of the Reformation Parliament ends.

=== Date unknown ===
- Aylesbury is granted the county town of Buckinghamshire, England by King Henry VIII.
- Stephen Báthory becomes governor of Transylvania.
- Borommarachathirat IV succeeds Ramathibodi II as king of Ayutthaya.
- Fluorite is first described, by Georg Agricola.
- Giorgio Vasari visits Rome.
- Pietro Bembo becomes historiographer of Venice.
- Heinrich Bullinger becomes pastor of Bremgarten, Switzerland.
- German polymath Heinrich Cornelius Agrippa publishes Declamatio de nobilitate et praecellentia foeminei sexus ("Declamation on the Nobility and Preeminence of the Female Sex"), a book pronouncing the theological and moral superiority of women.
- A summit level canal between Alster and the Trave in Germany opens to navigation.

== Births ==
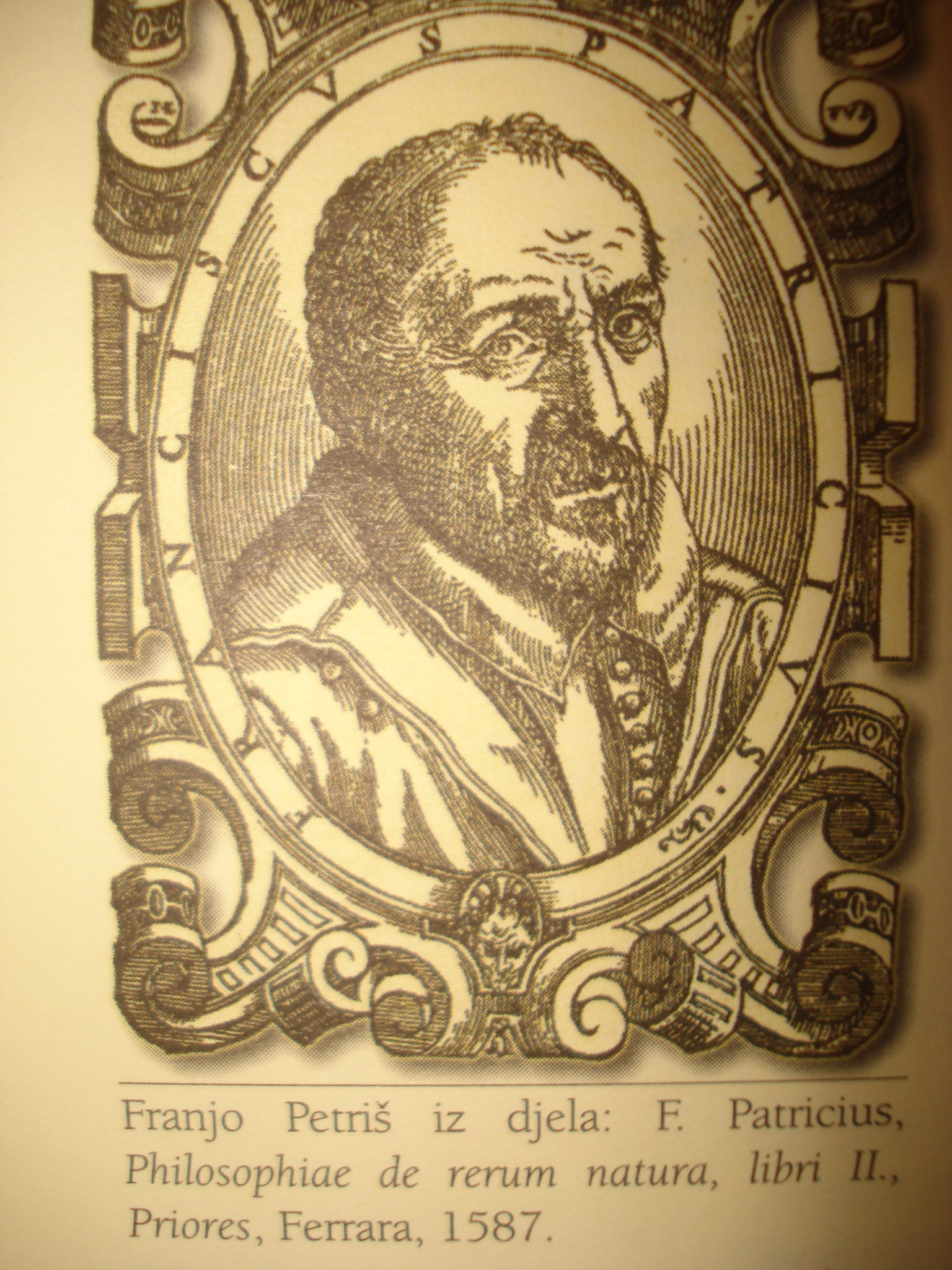
Franciscus Patricius

- January 8 – John Frederick II, Duke of Saxony (d. 1595)
- January 13 – Ebba Lilliehöök, aka Ebba Månsdotter, Swedish noble (d. 1609)
- February 14 – Markus Fugger, German businessman (d. 1597)
- February 23 – Onofrio Panvinio, Augustinian historian (d. 1568)
- April 3 – Michael Neander, German mathematician and historian (d. 1581)
- April 25 – Francesco Patrizi, Italian philosopher and scientist (d. 1597)
- May 12 – Sabina of Brandenburg-Ansbach, German princess (d. 1575)
- June 7 – Étienne Pasquier, French lawyer, poet and author (d. 1615)
- June 14 – Ferdinand II, Archduke of Austria, regent of Tyrol and Further Austria (d. 1595)
- July 16 – Petrus Peckius the Elder, Dutch jurist, writer on international maritime law (d. 1589)
- July 20 – Henry Sidney, lord deputy of Ireland (d. 1586)
- July 24 – Charles II, Margrave of Baden-Durlach (d. 1577)
- August 10 – Ernst Vögelin, German publisher (d. 1589)
- September 1 – Taddeo Zuccari, Italian painter (d. 1566)
- September 25 – Günther XLI, Count of Schwarzburg-Arnstadt (d. 1583)
- October 26 – Anna of Hesse, Countess Palatine of Zweibrücken (d. 1591)
- December 11 – Fulvio Orsini, Italian humanist historian (d. 1600)
- December 16 – Laurent Joubert, French physician (d. 1582)
- date unknown
  - Titu Cusi, Inca ruler of Vilcabamba (d. 1571)
  - Giambologna, Italian sculptor (d. 1608)
  - Michał Wiśniowiecki, Ruthenian prince at Wiśniowiec (d. 1584)
  - George Puttenham, English critic (d. 1590)

== Deaths ==
Baldassare Castiglione

- January 7 – Peter Vischer the Elder, German sculptor (b. 1455)
- January 9 – Wang Yangming, Chinese Neo-Confucian scholar (b. 1472)
- January 29 – Ōuchi Yoshioki, Japanese daimyo (b. 1477)
- February 2 – Baldassare Castiglione, Italian writer and diplomat (b. 1478)
- February 4 – Ludwig Haetzer, German Protestant reformer (executed) (b. 1500)
- March 28 – Philipp II, Count of Hanau-Münzenberg (b. 1501)
- April 20 – Silvio Passerini, Italian cardinal and lord of Florence (b. 1469)
- May 12 – Cecily Bonville, 7th Baroness Harington (b. c. 1460)
- June 21 – John Skelton, English poet (b. c. 1460)
- September 6 – George Blaurock, Swiss founder of the Anabaptist Church (b. 1491)
- September 27 – George of the Palatinate, German nobleman; Bishop of Speyer (1513–1529) (b. 1486)
- November 20 – Karl von Miltitz, German papal nuncio (b. c. 1490)
- date unknown
  - Krishnadevaraya, Vijaynagar emperor
  - Richard Pynson, Norman-born English printer (b. 1448)
  - Andrea Sansovino, Italian sculptor (b. 1467)
  - Petrus Särkilahti, Finnish Lutheran and scientist
  - Paulus Aemilius Veronensis, Italian historian (b. 1455)
- probable – Lo Spagna, Italian painter
- possible – La Malinche, Nahua (native Mexican) interpreter and translator for Hernán Cortés, during the Conquest of Mexico
