= Nobunaga o Koroshita Otoko =

Japanese manga series

- Nobunaga o Koroshita Otoko: Honnoji no Hen 431-nenme no Shinjitsu
- First tankōbon volume cover

信長を殺した男～本能寺の変 431年目の真実～ (Nobunaga o Koroshita Otoko: Honnoji no Hen 431-nenme no Shinjitsu)
- Genre: Historical
- Created by: Kenzaburō Akechi
- Manga
- Written by: Yutaka Tōdō
- Published by: Akita Shoten
- Imprint: Young Champion Comics
- Magazine: Bessatsu Young Champion
- Original run: August 2, 2016 – July 7, 2020
- Volumes: 8 + 1
- Manga

Nichirin no Demarcation
- Written by: Yutaka Tōdō
- Published by: Akita Shoten
- Imprint: Young Champion Comics
- Magazine: Bessatsu Young Champion
- Original run: February 2, 2021 – present
- Volumes: 10

Nobunaga o Koroshita Otoko: Honnoji no Hen 431-nenme no Shinjitsu (信長を殺した男～本能寺の変 431年目の真実～) is a Japanese manga series written and illustrated by Yutaka Tōdō. It was serialized in Akita Shoten's seinen manga magazine Bessatsu Young Champion from August 2016 to July 2020. The series is an adaptation of The Honnoji Incident: The Truth 431 Years Later by Kenzaburō Akechi.

== Synopsis ==
The series is a retelling of the Honnō-ji Incident from the perspective of Mitsuhide Akechi.

== Publication ==
Written and illustrated by Yutaka Tōdō, Nobunaga o Koroshita Otoko: Honnouji no Hen 431-nenme no Shinjitsu was serialized in Akita Shoten's seinen manga magazine Bessatsu Young Champion from August 2, 2016, to July 7, 2020. The series is an adaptation of The Honnoji Incident: The Truth 431 Years Later novel by Kenzaburō Akechi. Its chapters were collected into eight tankōbon volumes from May 19, 2017, to October 20, 2020.

A sequel manga, titled Nobunaga o Koroshita Otoko: Nichirin no Demarcation, began serialization in the same magazine on February 2, 2021. The sequel's chapters have been collected into ten tankōbon volumes as of August 2026.

=== Volumes ===
No.	Release date	ISBN
1	May 19, 2017	978-4-253-14191-8
2	October 20, 2017	978-4-253-14192-5
3	October 19, 2018	978-4-253-14193-2
4	September 20, 2018	978-4-253-14192-5
5	March 19, 2019	978-4-253-14195-6
6	September 19, 2019	978-4-253-14196-3
Ex	December 20, 2019	978-4-253-14190-1
7	March 19, 2020	978-4-253-14197-0
8	October 20, 2020	978-4-253-14198-7

=== Nichirin no Demarcation ===
No.	Release date	ISBN
1	October 20, 2021	978-4-253-30255-5
2	May 19, 2022	978-4-253-30256-2
3	November 18, 2022	978-4-253-30257-9
4	May 18, 2023	978-4-253-30258-6
5	November 20, 2023	978-4-253-30259-3
6	June 19, 2024	978-4-253-30260-9
7	February 19, 2025	978-4-253-30261-6
8	July 18, 2025	978-4-253-30262-3
9	January 8, 2026	978-4-253-00963-8
10	August 20, 2026	978-4-253-01903-3

== Reception ==
By October 2020, the series had over 1.6 million copies in circulation. By November 2023, the series had over 2.7 million copies in circulation.
