= Sadakatsu =

- Gender: Male

Origin
- Origin: Japanese
- Meaning: Different meanings depending on the kanji used

Sadakatsu (written: 定勝 or 貞勝) is a masculine Japanese given name. Notable people with the name include:

- Hisamatsu Sadakatsu (久松 定勝; 1560–1624), Japanese daimyō
- Murai Sadakatsu (村井 貞勝; 1528–1582), Japanese samurai
