= Takamatsu Castle (Bitchū) =

- 高松城
- Okayama, Okayama Prefecture, Japan
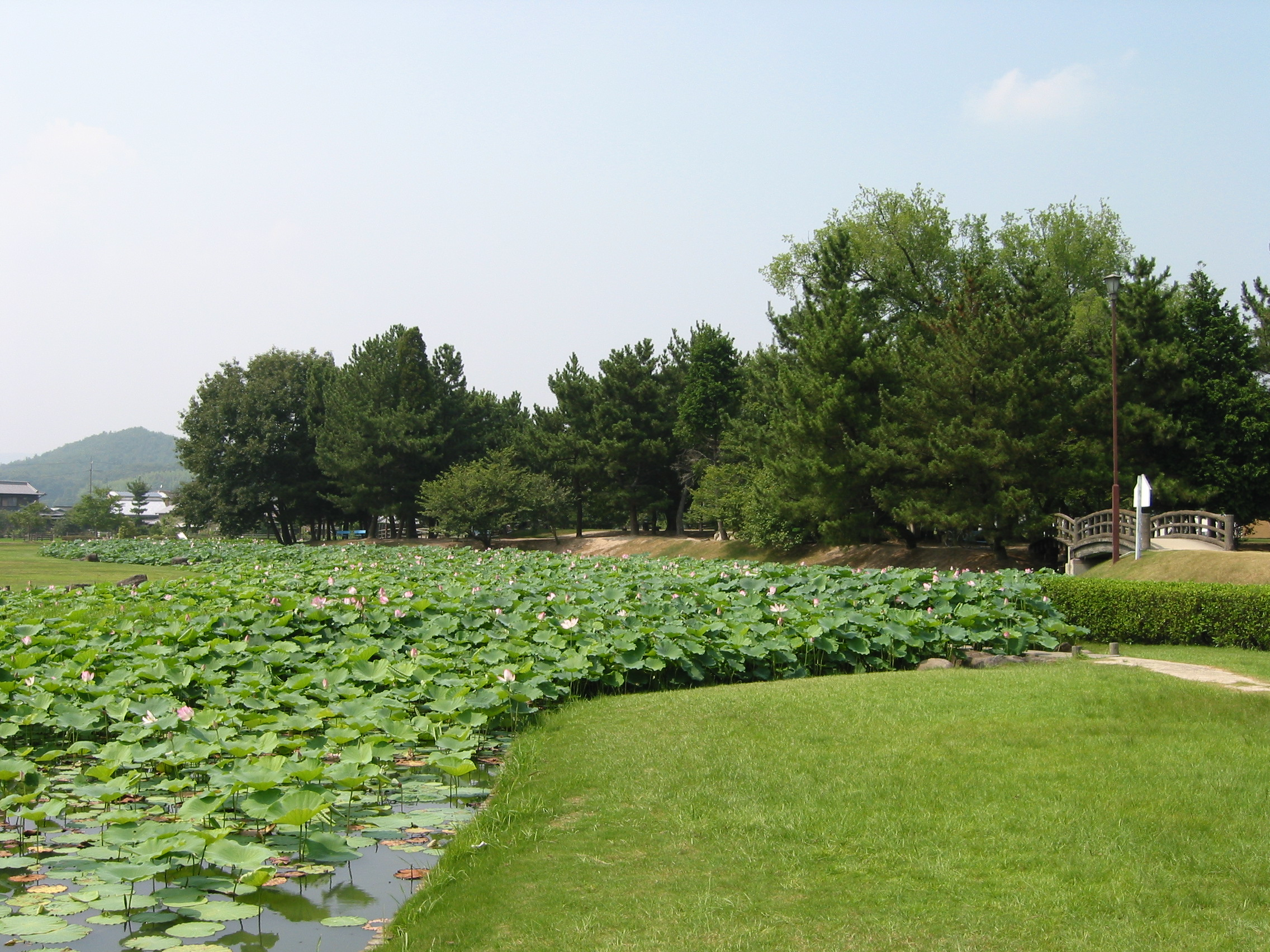
- Honmaru Base and Moat of Takamatsu Castle

Site information
- Type: Azuchi-Momoyama castle
- Controlled by: Ishikawa clan (until 1575), Mōri clan (1575–1582), Toyotomi Hideyoshi (1582–1598), Hanabusa clan (c. 1598 – mid-17th century)
- Condition: ruins

Location
- Takamatsu Castle Takamatsu Castle (Japan)
- Coordinates: 34°41′34.8″N 133°49′19.36″E

Site history
- Built: late 16th century
- Built by: Mimura clan
- In use: late 16th to mid-17th centuries
- Materials: Wood, stone, plaster
- Battles/wars: Siege of Takamatsu (1582)

Garrison information
- Past commanders: Shimizu Muneharu (c. 1575–1582); Hanabusa Masanari

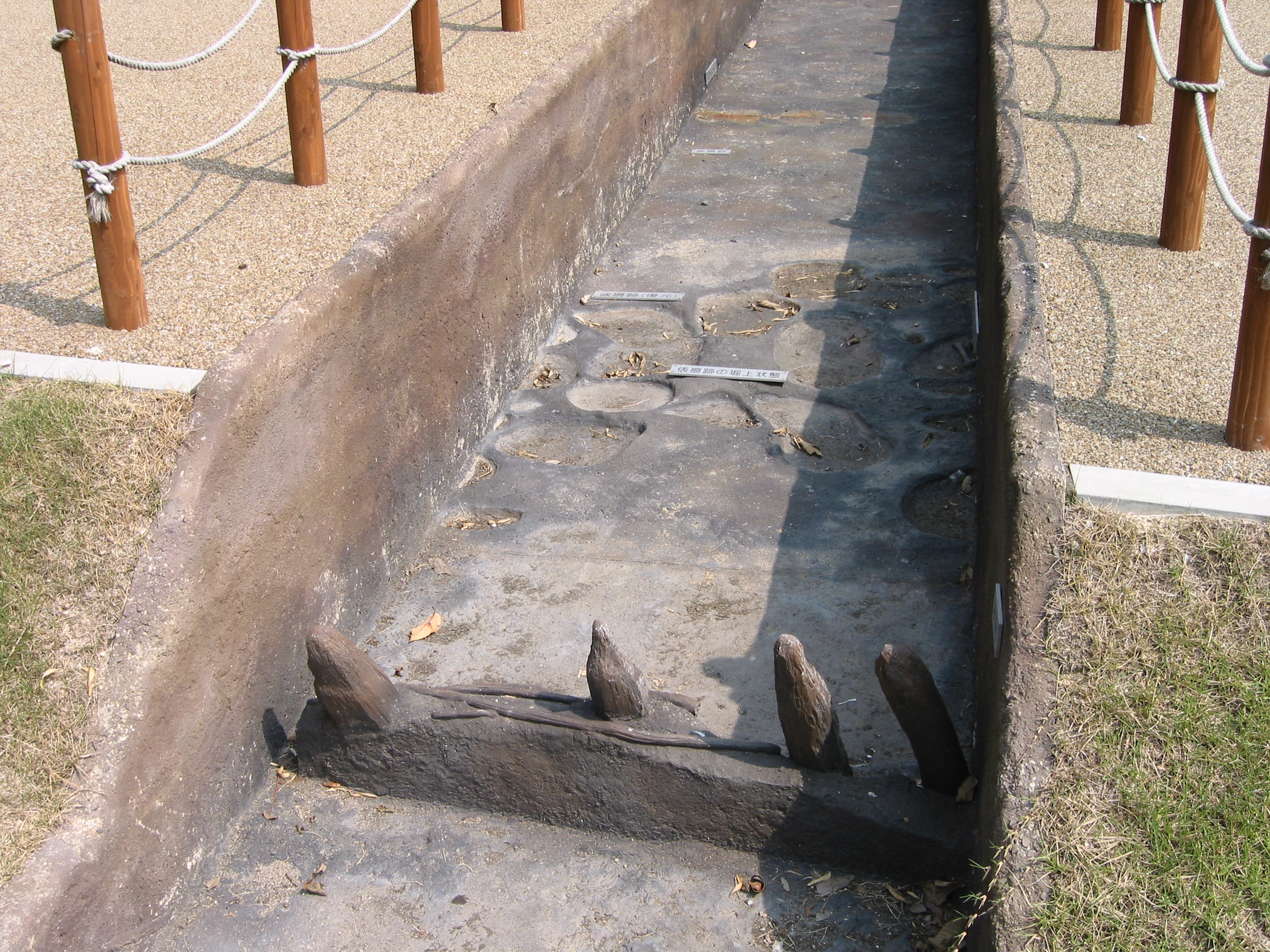
An excavated portion of the dike and embankment base constructed by Toyotomi Hideyoshi in his 1582 siege of the castle

Takamatsu Castle (高松城, Takamatsu-jō) of Bitchū Province was a Sengoku period Japanese castle located in what is today the Kayo neighborhood of Kita-ku, Okayama in Okayama Prefecture. The style of the castle was a hirajō (flatland castle) with no stone walls, but only earthen walls. The castle was surrounded by marshes, which formed a natural moat. Its ruins have been protected by the central government as a National Historic Site since 1902.

== History ==
It is not clear when a castle was built at this location, which is located between central Okayama city and the Takahashi River. Historically this area had been a granary area and the main base of ancient Kingdom of Kibi. The route of the San'yōdō highway which connected Kyoto with Shimonoseki passed through natural levee just at south of the castle. During the early Sengoku period, the Mimura clan ruled the entire Bitchu region from Bitchu-Matsuyama Castle, and the Mimura ordered their vassals, the Ishikawa clan, to build a fortification at this site. The Ishikawa and Mimura were destroyed by the Mōri clan in 1575, and the castle was awarded to Shimizu Muneharu, a senior vassal of the Ishikawa who had defected to the Mōri. In 1582, Hashiba Hideyoshi was ordered to conquer western Japan by Oda Nobunaga and laid siege to Takamatsu Castle. As Takamatsu Castle was surrounded by marshes, it was considered impregnable to a normal assault and was expected to be able to withstand a prolonged siege. However, Hideyoshi adopted an innovative approach at the suggestion of his strategist Kuroda Kanbei. By paying extravagant amounts of money for round-the-clock efforts, he completed a three-kilometer long dike, damming the outlets to the marshes within 11 days. Aided by the arrival of the rainy season, the castle was soon flooded. Shimizu Muneharu was forced to surrender, committing seppuku in exchange for the lives of his troops.

Following this siege, and the rise of Toyotomi Hideyoshi to power after the assassination of Oda Nobunaga, the castle became part of the territory of Ukita Hideie, who assigned it to his karō, Hanabusa Masashige. Following the Battle of Sekigahara in 1600, the Ukita clan sided with the losing Western army; however, the Hanabusa clan fought alongside the Eastern Army of Tokugawa Ieyasu, and were awarded hatamoto status as direct retainers of the Tokugawa shogunate. Some years later the Hanabusa relocated from Takamatsu to Abe, in what is today Sōja city and the castle was abandoned.

Today, only a portion of the dam built by Hideyoshi and a small part of the castle's masonry has survived, and almost no trace of the castle remains. The ruins include the alleged burial mounds for Shimizu Muneharu's head, and for his body. The site has been maintained as the Takamatsu Castle Siege Historic Site Park (高松城水攻め史跡公園, Takamatsu-jō mizuzeme shiseki kōen), with markers, such as wooden posts, show the area where the castle, dikes, and siege equipment were once located and where Shimizu Muneharu committed suicide.

On April 6, 2017 Bitchu Takamatsu Castle was designated by the Japanese Castle Foundation as Okayama Prefecture's only entry on the Continued Top 100 Japanese Castles (続日本100名城). The list adds to the original Top 100 list totaling 200 castles. Bitchu Takamatsu Castle is listed as #171. The castle ruins are a ten minutes walk from JR West Kibi Line Bitchu-Takamatsu Station.

== In popular culture ==
Takamatsu Castle was featured in the video game Soulcalibur by Namco, used as the fighting stage for the character Heishiro Mitsurugi. The game contains two versions of the stage, one set during the siege and the other set in the winter following it.

== See also ==
- List of Historic Sites of Japan (Okayama)

== Literature ==
- De Lange, William (2021). An Encyclopedia of Japanese Castles. Groningen: Toyo Press. pp. 600 pages. ISBN 978-9492722300.
- Sansom, George (1961). A History of Japan: 1334–1615. Stanford, California: Stanford University Press
- Turnbull, Stephen (1998). The Samurai Sourcebook. London: Cassell & Co.
