= Shimizu Muneharu =

Japanese military commander for the Mōri Clan (1537 – 1582)

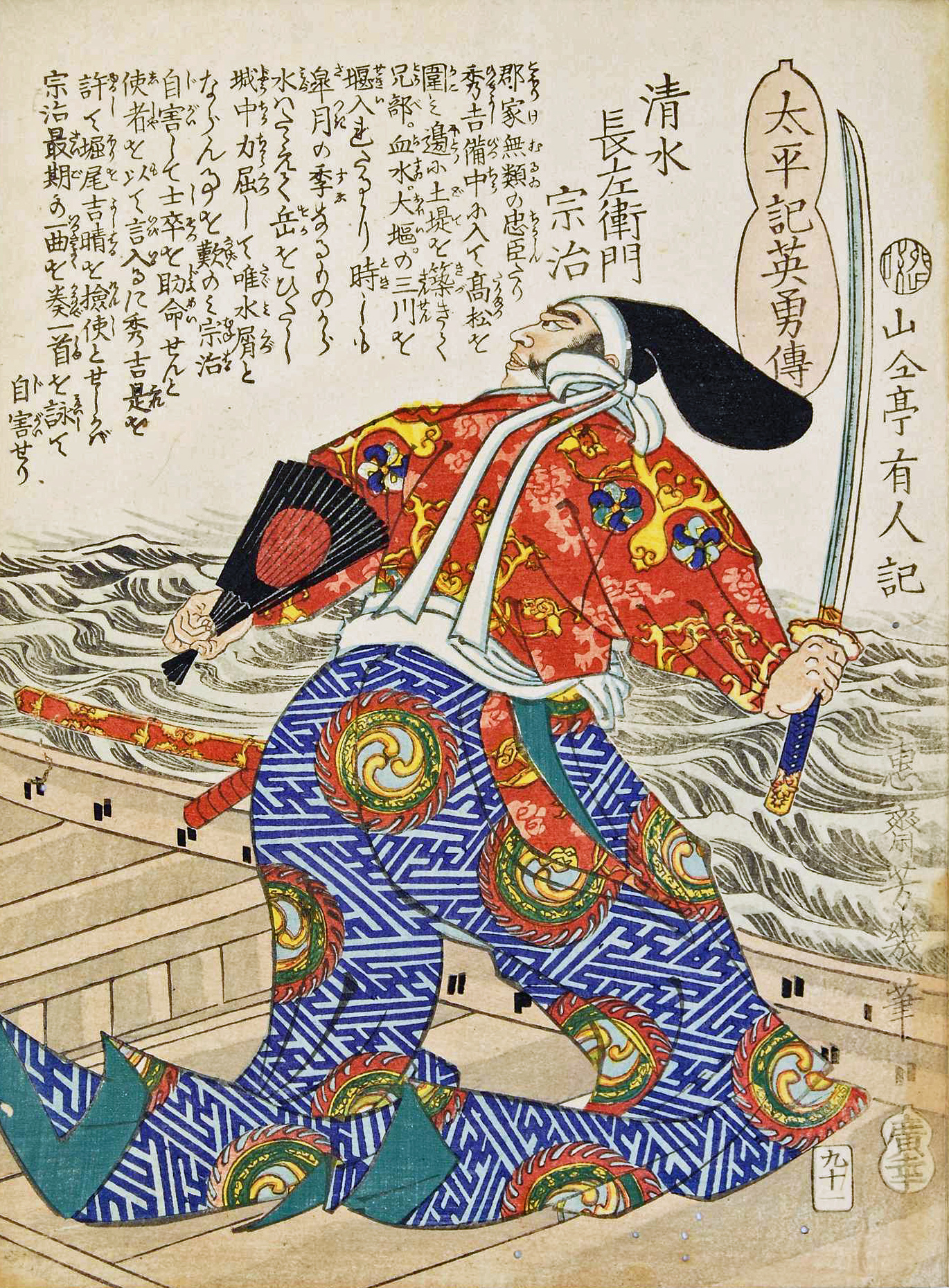
Shimizu Muneharu

Shimizu Muneharu (清水 宗治; 1537 – June 23, 1582), also known as Shimizu Chōzaemon (清水 長左衛門), was a military commander during the Sengoku period. He served the Mōri clan (one of the powerful clans in Bitchu Province) as a retainer to Kobayakawa Takakage and took part in the expedition to unify the Chūgoku region. He was lord of Shimizu castle at Bitchu Province, and became the lord of the Bitchu Takamatsu Castle after he captured it in 1565. His father was Shimizu Munenori.

Hashiba Hideyoshi (later Toyotomi Hideyoshi), a retainer of Oda Nobunaga, went on an expedition to the Chūgoku region to reunify Japan in 1582. Muneharu resisted Hideyoshi, locking himself in Bitchu Takamatsu Castle. Hideyoshi advised Muneharu to surrender on the condition that Muneharu give him Bitchu Province, but Muneharu refused. Takamatsu Castle was flooded by Hideyoshi and nearly fell.

In June, during the flooding, Nobunaga died in the Incident at Honnōji in Kyoto. Having heard about Nobunaga's death, Hideyoshi made peace overtures on the condition that Muneharu commit seppuku (suicide).

Shimizu's grave is at Seikyō-ji, Hikari, Yamaguchi Prefecture.
