= Yasuda Kunitsugu =

- 安田 国継
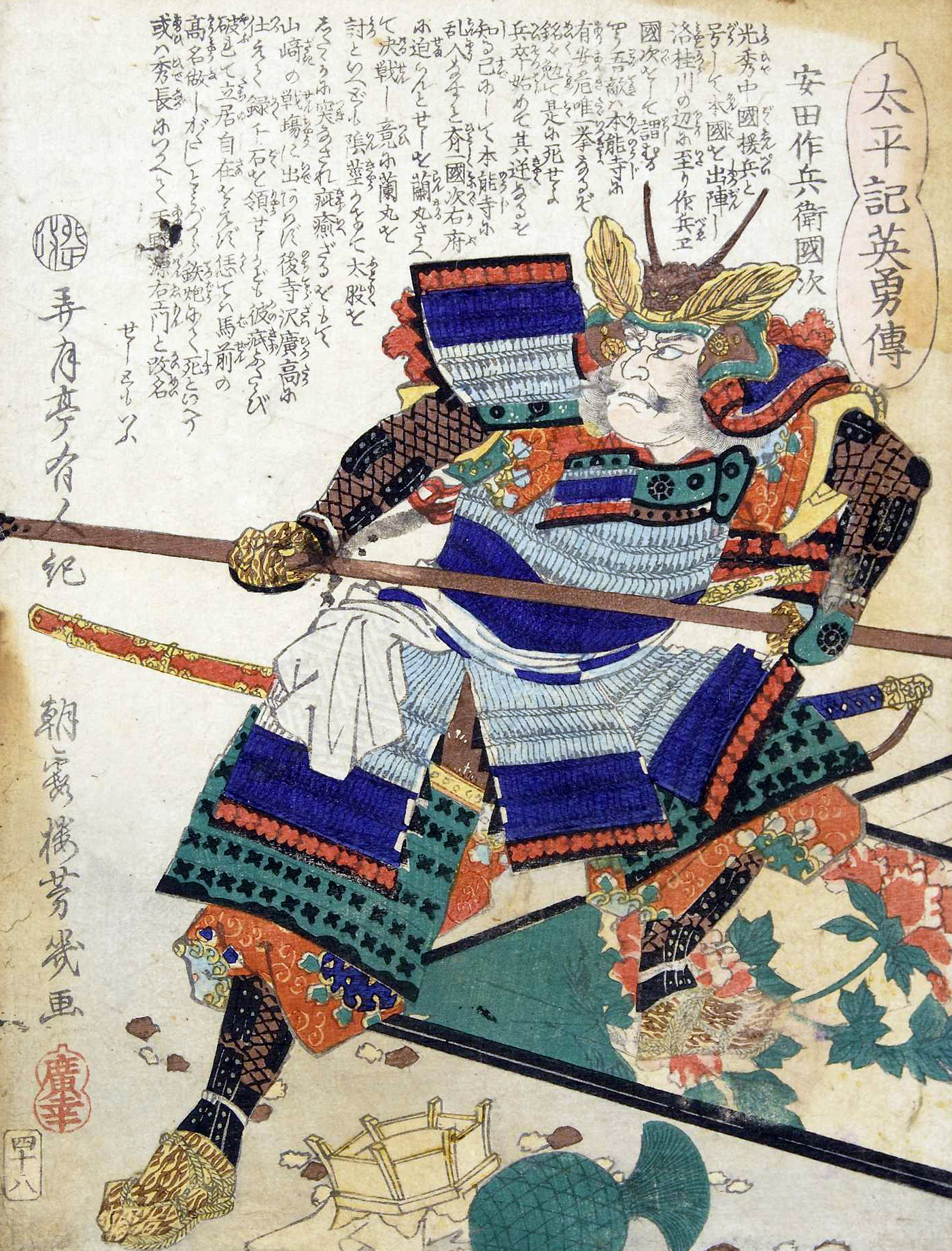
- Taihei-ki Eiyūden: Yasuda Kunitsugu by Utagawa Yoshiiku
- Born: 1556
- Died: July 16, 1597 (aged 40–41)
- Other name: Sakubei
- Occupation: samurai lord

Yasuda Kunitsugu (安田 国継; 1556 - July 16, 1597) was a Japanese samurai lord during the Sengoku and Azuchi-Momoyama period. In kōdan, he is known as Yasuda Sakubei.

== Life ==
Kunitsugu was born in Yasuda, Mino Province in 1556.

He first served Saitō Toshimitsu, a subordinate of Oda clan's chief vassal, Akechi Mitsuhide. In 1582, during the Honnō-ji Incident, he was sent to fight against Mitsuhide's lord, Oda Nobunaga. He attacked Nobunaga with a spear, but Mori Ranmaru blocked his way and pierced his lower abdomen with a cross-shaped spear. However, there is a heroic story that Kunitsugu was successful in killing Nobunaga.

He then went on to serve Tachibana Muneshige, and was successful in the Kyushu Campaign by Toyotomi clan. In addition, during the Imjin War, he went to Korea.

Lastly, he served Terazawa Hirotaka and received 8,000 koku.

Kunitsugu died on July 16, 1597, at the age of 42. His cause of death is said to be a suicide after suffering from a worsening cheek tumor. The day he died was the same day as Oda Nobunaga's death, and it was rumored that he had stabbed Nobunaga. His resting place is Jōdai-ji Temple in Karatsu, Saga Prefecture. His Dharma name is Zenjin Zenmon.
