= Paulus Aemilius Veronensis =

Italian historian

Paulus Aemilius Veronensis (Italian: Paolo Emilio da Verona) (c. 1455 – 1529) was an Italian historian.

He was born in Verona. He obtained such a reputation in his own country that he was invited to France c. 1489 in the reign of Charles VIII, in order to write in Latin the history of the kings of France, and was presented to a canonry in Notre Dame de Paris. He enjoyed the patronage and support of Louis XII. He died in Paris on 5 May 1529, before he could finish this work. His work De Rebus gestis Francorum was translated into French in 1581, and has also been translated into Italian and German.
