= Severo Bonini =

Italian composer (1582–1663)

Severo Bonini (23 December 1582 – 5 December 1663) was an Italian composer, organist, and writer on music.

He was born in Florence and became a Benedictine monk. He studied singing with Giulio Caccini. He served as organist in Forlì from 1613 and held a number of other posts before returning to Florence in 1640 where he was maestro di cappella and organist at Santa Trinita until his death. He died in Florence.

He published several books of music, including motets and madrigals. He wrote music in the new monodic style. His treatise Prima parte de' discorsi e regole sovra la musica (1649–1650) is an important source of information on contemporary composers and the rise of monody and opera.
