= Murai Sadakatsu =

Japanese samurai (1528–1582)

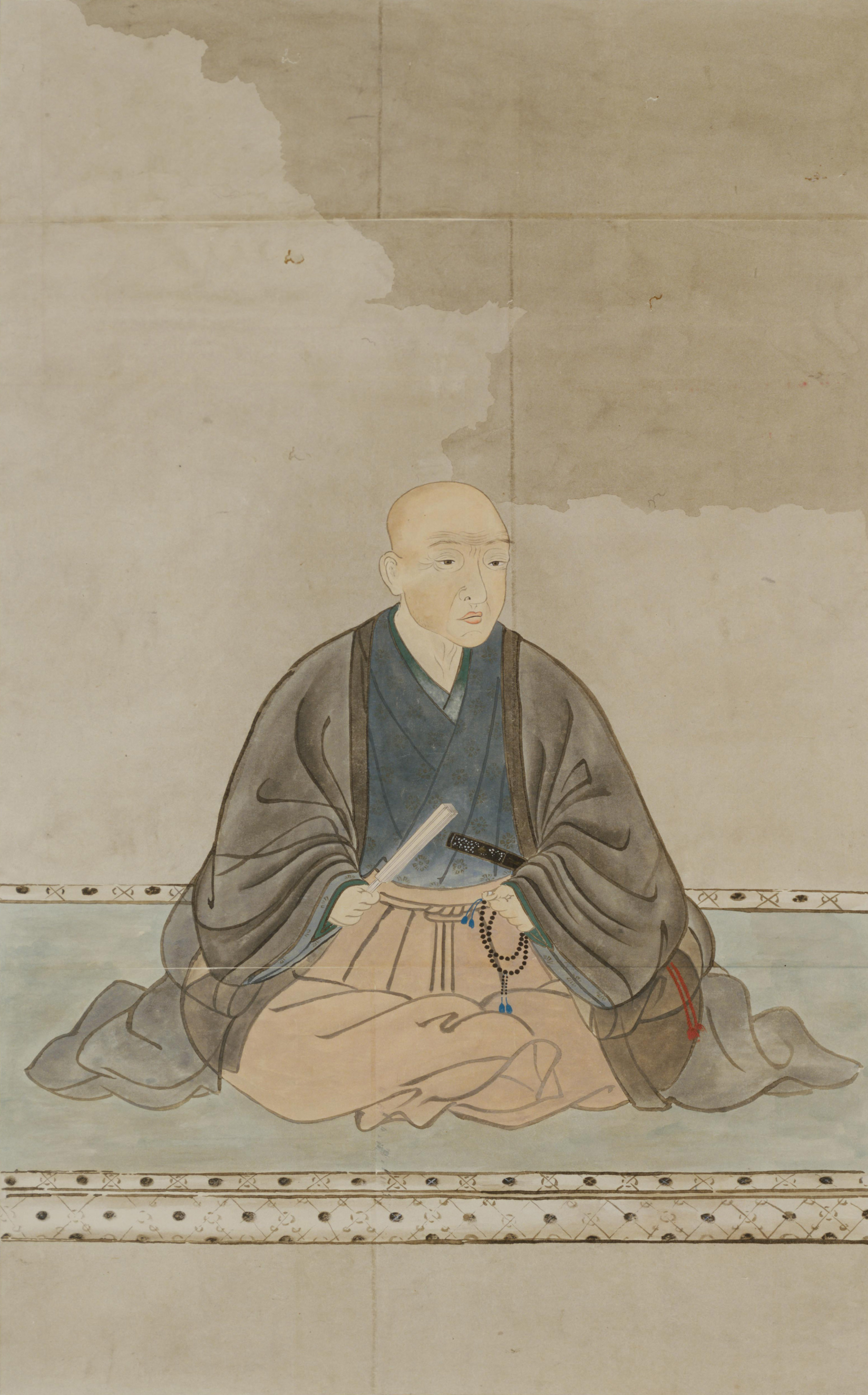
Murai Sadakatsu

Murai Sadakatsu (村井 貞勝, 1528 – June 21, 1582) was a Japanese samurai of the Sengoku period through early Azuchi-Momoyama period, who served the Oda clan. He was active in the Oda clan's administration in Kyoto.

In the Siege of Shiga in September of 1570, he entered the fort of Anota with Sakuma Nobumori, Akechi Mitsuhide, Kawajiri Hidetaka, and Sassa Narimasa.

Sadakatsu died in 1582, during the Incident at Honnō-ji.
