= Siege of Takamatsu =

1582 event during Japan's Sengoku period

- Part of the Sengoku period
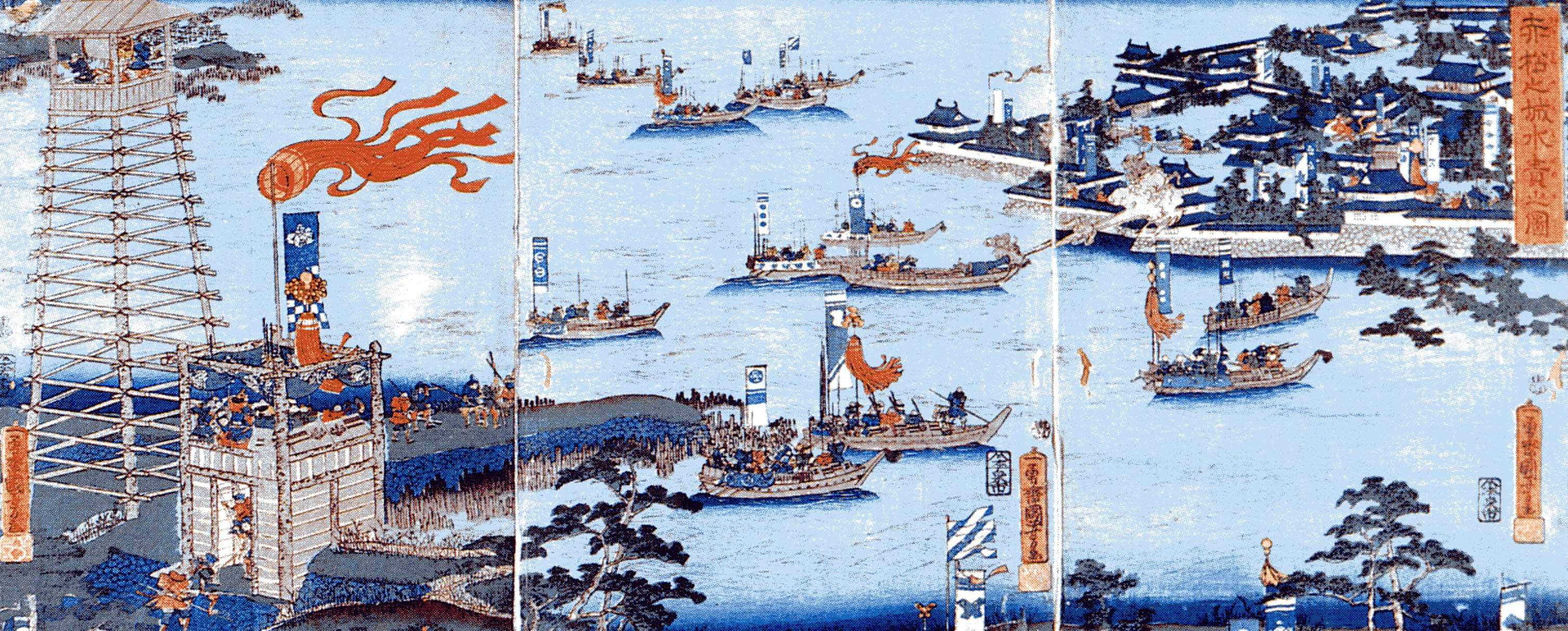
- Edo period portrait of Takamatsu submerged in water
Date	April – June 1582
Location	Takamatsu Castle, Bitchū Province 34°41′35″N 133°49′19″E
Result	Peace negotiation; Oda's forces withdraw due to the Honnō-ji Incident

Belligerents
Forces of Oda Nobunaga	Forces of Mōri Terumoto

Commanders and leaders
Hashiba Hideyoshi; Ukita Tadaie; Hachisuka Koroku; Kuroda Kanbei; Horio Yoshiharu; Asano Nagamasa; Konishi Yukinaga; Kato Kiyomasa; Ishida Mitsunari; Otani Yoshitsugu	Castle Garrison : Shimizu Muneharu (executed); Nanba Denbe; Suechika Saemon; Mori Reinforcement : Kikkawa Motoharu; Kobayakawa Takakage; Ankokuji Ekei

Strength
20,000 Oda troops 10,000 Ukita troops total: 30,000 men	castle garrison: 5,000 men Mori reinforcement: 40,000 men total: 45,000 men
- Location within Okayama Prefecture Siege of Takamatsu (Japan)

In the 1582 siege of Takamatsu (備中高松城の戦い, Bitchū Takamatsu-jō no tatakai), Toyotomi Hideyoshi laid siege to Takamatsu Castle, which was controlled by the Mōri clan. He diverted a nearby river with dikes to surround and flood the castle. He also constructed towers on barges from which his gunmen could keep up a constant rate of fire and be unhindered themselves by the flooding.

== Background ==
On the order of Oda Nobunaga, Hashiba Hideyoshi conquered Chūgoku region, and besieged Takamatsu Castle, defended by Mori's vassal, Shimizu Muneharu, in Bitchu Province in the territory of the Mori clan.

== Prelude ==
On April 17, 1582, Hideyoshi at last left Himeji Castle for Bitchu in his departure for the front with his 20,000 soldiers. On the way, he watched for the movement of the Ukita clan in Kameyama Castle, where the Ukita clan had resided, making sure that the Ukita clan would take sides with the Oda forces, and entered into Bitchu with 30,000-strong troops, with the addition of Ukita's 10,000 soldiers.

== Siege ==
On May 17, the Hideyoshi forces besieged the Takamatsu castle with an army of as many as 30,000 troops, led by the Ukita forces. Though they attacked the castle two times, they lost in the face of counterattacks by castle garrisons.

As the battle grew more intense, the Takamatsu garrison received reinforcements from Mōri Terumoto, who brought an army two times larger than Hideyoshi's. Additionally, with the 40,000 support troops led by "Mori's Two Rivers" approaching, Hideyoshi dispatched a messenger to request aid from Oda Nobunaga, who had just defeated the Takeda clan in Kai Province, to send over support troops. In response, Nobunaga mobilized six of his commanders including Akechi Mitsuhide, whom he planned to lead the resultant army. But Nobunaga gave Hideyoshi strict orders to conquer Takamatsu Castle as soon as possible. Later, Kuroda Yoshitaka offered an idea of using inundation tactics.

Adopting this tactic, Hideyoshi immediately started building an embankment, under the direction of Kuroda Yoshitaka, with support from Hachisuka Masakatsu, Ukita Tadaie, Horio Yoshiharu, Ikoma Chikamasa, Kuwayama Shigeharu, and Toda Masaharu. Meanwhile Asano Nagamasa and Konishi Yukinaga assembled boats and boatmen to make preparations for attacking the castle when it would be floating on a lake.

On June 3rd, a commander within the Mōri clan, Uehara Motosuke, defected to Hideyoshi's side, Hideyoshi proceeded to grant him a shuinjo (vermillion letter) that promised Motosuke the ownership of Bingo Province. The letter was composed a day after Nobunaga's death (the content was discovered through an auction and was publicly revealed on 20 November 2025).

On June 8th, which happened to be in the rainy season, the long-lasting rain swelled the Ashimori river, developing a lake and rendered Takamatsu Castle a solitary island. Takamatsu Castle was flooded by Hideyoshi and nearly fell. This made the provisions of rice for the garrison army decline by cutting their supply lines, and Mori's support troops were unable to move. In addition, Asano Nagamasa and Konishi Yukinaga were in charge of naval bombardment on the north side of the castle.

Mori decided to make peace with Hideyoshi. They sent Ankokuji Ekei, for Kuroda Yoshitaka to offer peace negotiations.

== Aftermath ==
Hideyoshi soon learned of the Incident at Honnōji and the death of Nobunaga, which encouraged him to end the siege. Hideyoshi made peace overtures with Mori's forces, on the condition that Muneharu commit seppuku. Later, Shimizu Muneharu, the castle's commander, was forced to commit suicide in a boat on the artificial lake created by the flooding, in full view of both sides.

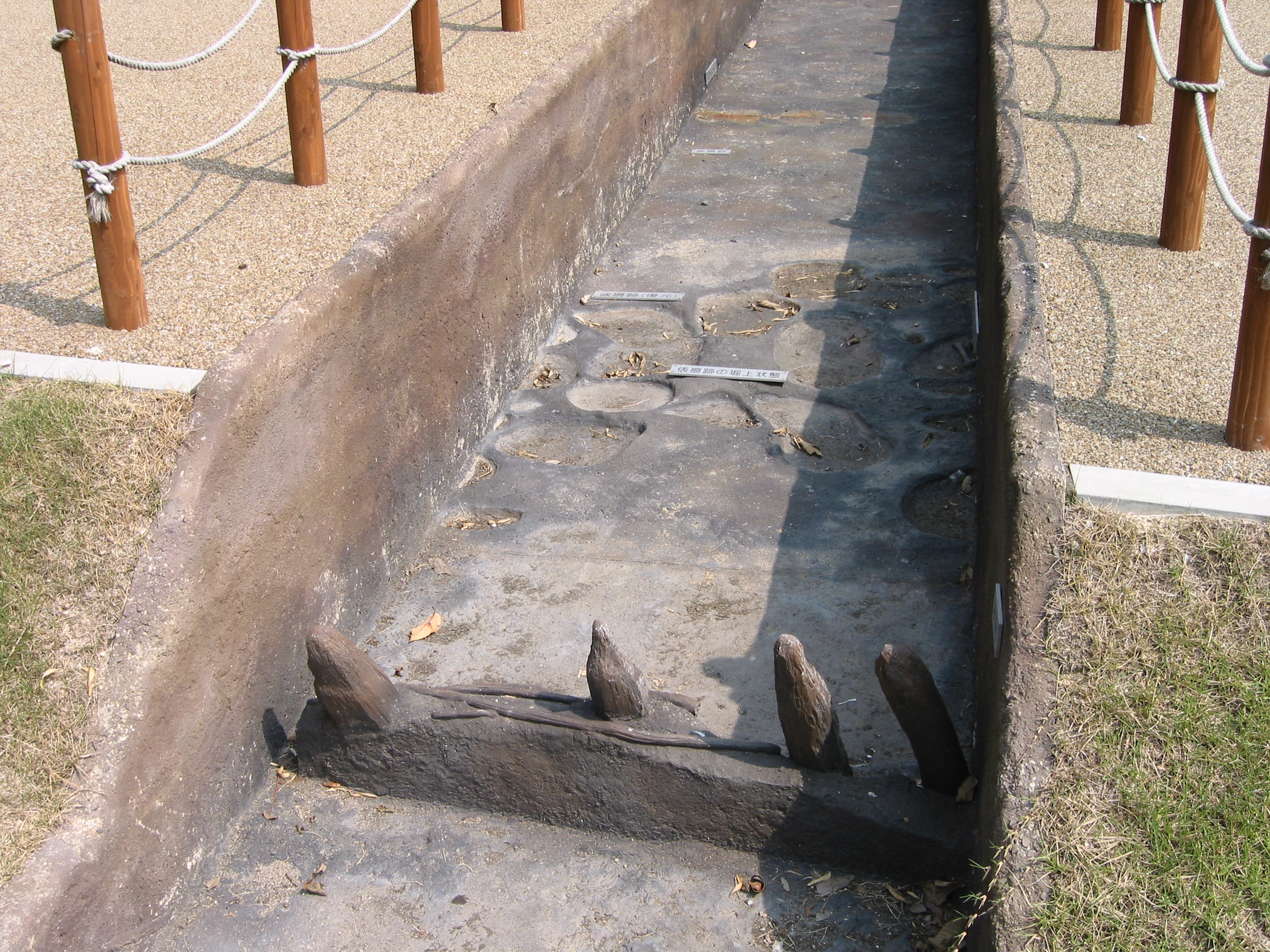
Part of the excavated levee formed by Hideyoshi to flood the castle

== Cultural references ==
The siege is described and dramatized in the novel Taiko: An Epic Novel of War and Glory in Feudal Japan, written by Eiji Yoshikawa and translated to English by William Scott Wilson.

== Literature ==
- De Lange, William (2021). An Encyclopedia of Japanese Castles. Groningen: Toyo Press. pp. 600 pages. ISBN 978-9492722300.
