= Ochimusha =

"Fallen warrior" in Japanese folklore

An ochimusha (落ち武者) means "fallen warrior" in the sense that a samurai on the defeated side has fallen out of his retinue. Such Ochimusha were often hunted, a practice called ochimushagari (落ち武者狩り), after their army was defeated and they could no longer be protected among their men, and their mission was to make it back to their side safely.

The word comes from the greatest massacre of the defeated Heike clan samurai by the victorious Minamoto clan, the Heike no Ochudo (平家の落人) that happened right after the Genpei War in the Heian Period.

Fallen out of their retinue, ochimusha were hunted by peasants who wanted back the expensive samurai equipment paid with exorbitant peasant taxes, or take their severed heads to the opposing side after a battle, which was often encouraged with bounties. For example, in the Sengoku period, the act of hunting down ochimusha by the local peasants had been officially recognized. In some cases some even elevated in social rank from hunting down such samurai.

A book, the Kefukigusa (1638), records the haiku 秋風に露や落武者薄のほ which led to the vernacular adage, "Even crop kernels scare the Ochimusha," (落ち武者は薄の穂にも怖ず) referring to the frightened state of such samurai terrified of peasant vengeance.

Instead of only occurring during battle times, samurais and aristocrats whose support is no longer needed can also become an ochimusha, if attacked by the townspeople of the region. There are records of samurai mansions being plundered, even in the peaceful Edo period. Such events are called uchikowashi (打ちこわし).

A criminal banished into exile is also subject to becoming an ochimusha.

In some areas of Nagano and Gifu Prefecture, ochimusha are referred to as daikō (だいこう). They also used to be called ochipuwaa (おちぷはあ) in some parts of Kansai, but this term is no longer in use due to derogatory connotations.

== Appearance ==
The iconography usually represents the ochimusha with the crown of his head shaved and the rest of the hair long and loose, a dissolved chonmage (topknot). The dissolved chonmage would then mean losing the social status of the samurai. Arrows stuck in the body is also a common motif.

== Modern usage ==
In modern times, the term is used to refer to politicians that lose an election, while the term "ochimusha hunting" is used in regard to a candidate caught cheating in an election or to corrupt politicians that have been arrested.

Sometimes, the term is also used to refer to people with a bald top head and stretched hair on the sides.

== See also ==
- Rōnin
