= Laurent Joubert =

French physician

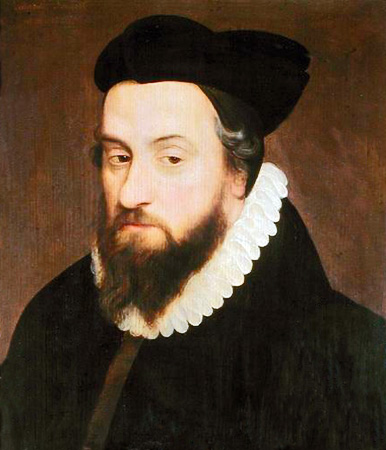
Painting of Laurent Joubert

Laurent Joubert (16 December 1529 – 21 October 1582) was a French physician. He travelled to Montpellier at the age of 21 to study medicine, and became a student of Guillaume Rondelet, the chancellor of the Medical Faculty at the University of Montpellier. Soon after Rondelet's death in 1556, Joubert succeeded him as chancellor. He was later summoned by Catherine de' Medici, the queen consort of France, to be her personal physician. Joubert went on to become one of the physicians to Henry III of France. Joubert was married to Louise Guichard, the sister of the doctor to the King of Navarre.

== Biography and works ==
Born in Dauphiné, France, Joubert was a significant figure in a movement that sought to challenge medical superstitions and ignorance in France. In his two-volume Erreurs Populaires of 1578, he made clear, for example, that it was untrue that male children were born at full moon and female children at new moon. On the other hand, he erroneously suggested that a male child could be conceived at certain times of night or the month. Joubert's stated aim was to raise physicians and surgeons from their "routine illiterate practice" and to inform the people how better to look after themselves. In this endeavour, he made use of the growing influence of the press, contributing to the transfer from an oral to a printed tradition in medical knowledge.

Joubert and his colleagues met with opposition from those who, regarding the classical Greek and Latin medical texts as sacrosanct, were suspicious of medical advice written in French. Joubert argued that those who sought to deny people the knowledge to maintain their own health were no better than those who denied them the right to read religious texts in their own language. In effect, he was challenging closely guarded monopolies on medical knowledge, though he insisted that patients would be more likely to follow doctors' orders if they could understand them.

In Erreurs Populaires, Joubert addressed a series of popular errors in turn, which he documented and then discussed by reference to his own experience and practice. Of one local custom, he wrote: "Is it a good idea to sit a woman in labour on a hot cauldron, or to put her husband's hat on her stomach, as do the good women of the villages around Montpellier? The hat probably will not help much, except perhaps to serve as a compress and help expulsion".

Joubert wrote numerous medical texts in both Latin and French. Several of these were only published a few years before his death, and others continued to be published after he died, with the last work being published in 1603. His edition of Grande Chirurgie, a work by the 14th-century surgeon Guy de Chauliac, was a translation into French from the original Latin, making the work more accessible to contemporary surgeons.

- Traitté des Arcbusades (1574)
- Grande Chirurgie de M. Guy de Chauliac (1578)
- Erreurs populaires (1578)
- Question vulgaire (1578)
- Traité du Ris (1579)
- Pharmacopea (1579)
- Traité des eaux (1603)

He died near Montpellier, France.

== External links and sources ==
- The Laurent Joubert website, maintained by Gregory de Rocher of the University of Alabama
- Laurent Joubert of Montpellier (1529-82) and his Erreurs Populaires, Peter M. Dunn, Arch Dis Child Fetal Neonatal Ed 2000;82:F255-F256
- Gigou, Laure. "Cabinet de Joubert, Laurent". curiositas.org (in French).
