= Honnō-ji Incident =

1582 attempted assassination of Oda Nobunaga

- Part of the Sengoku period
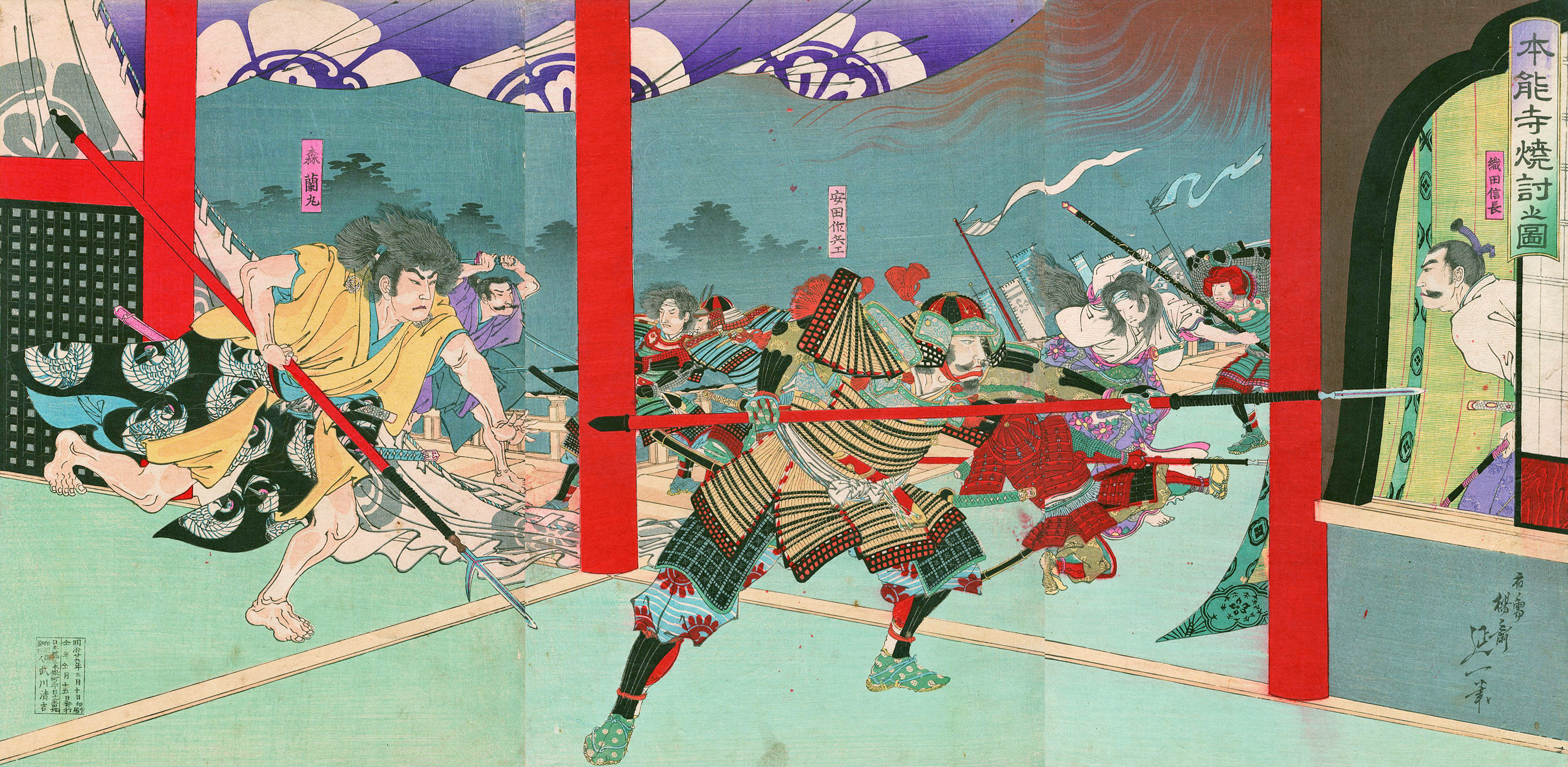
- Incident at Honnō-ji, Meiji-era print
Date	21 June 1582
Location	Honnō-ji and Nijō Palace, Kyoto, Japan 35.005833°N 135.753889°E
Result	Akechi victory
Territorial changes	Beginning of Akechi's short-lived reign

Belligerents
Oda forces under Akechi Mitsuhide's command	Inhabitants and garrison of Honnō-ji, courtiers, merchants, artists, and servants of Oda Nobunaga

Commanders and leaders
Akechi Mitsuhide; Akechi Hidemitsu; Akechi Mitsutada; Ise Sadaoki; Saitō Toshimitsu; Shiōden Masataka; Yasuda Kunitsugu	Oda Nobunaga ‡‡; Oda Nagamasu; Oda Nobutada ‡‡; Oda Katsunaga †; Mori Ranmaru †; Murai Sadakatsu †; Maeda Gen'i

Strength
13,000	70

Casualties and losses
Unknown, presumably minimal	Oda Nobunaga, Mori Ranmaru, Oda Nobutada, and many others

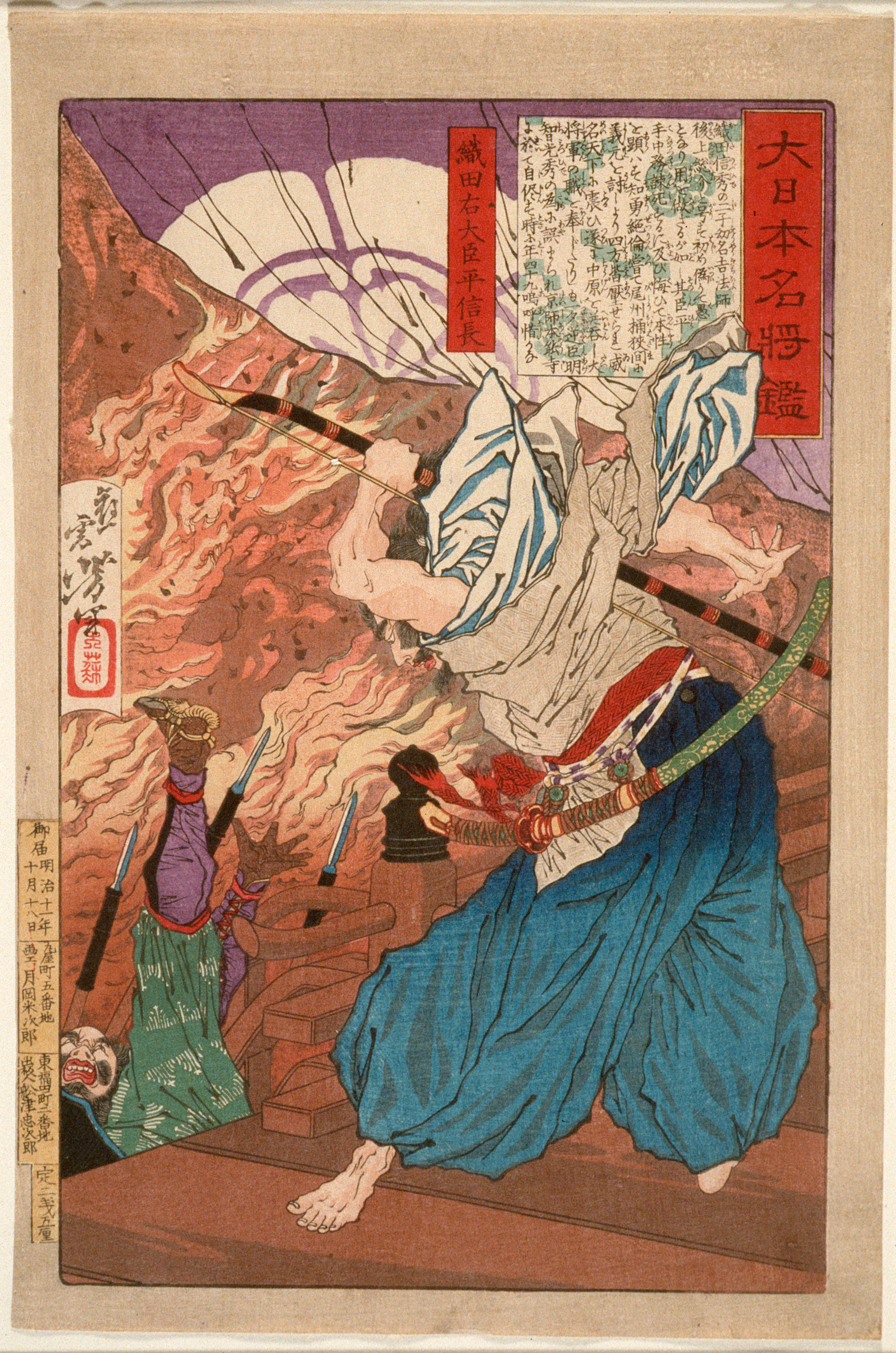
An ukiyo-e by Yoshitoshi depicting Nobunaga fighting in the Honnō-ji Incident.

The Honnō-ji Incident (本能寺の変, Honnō-ji no Hen) was the attempted assassination of Japanese daimyo Oda Nobunaga at Honnō-ji in Kyoto in 1582. Nobunaga was on the verge of unifying the country, but died by seppuku in the unexpected rebellion of his vassal Akechi Mitsuhide.

Nobunaga only had a few guards and retainers with him when he was attacked, ending his Sengoku period campaign to unify Japan under his power. Nobunaga's death was avenged two weeks later when his retainer Toyotomi Hideyoshi defeated Mitsuhide in the Battle of Yamazaki, paving the way for Hideyoshi to complete the unification of Japan.

Mitsuhide's motive for assassinating Nobunaga is unknown, though there are multiple theories for his betrayal.

== Background ==
By 1582, Oda Nobunaga was the most powerful daimyo in Japan. He was pursuing a campaign of unification amid the political upheaval of the Sengoku period. Earlier that year, he had destroyed the Takeda clan, at the Battle of Tenmokuzan, leaving central Japan firmly under his control; his rivals, the Mōri clan and the Uesugi clan, were both weakened by internal strife. The death of Uesugi Kenshin had left the Uesugi clan torn by an internal conflict between his two adopted sons. The Mōri clan was also facing near-certain defeat and had offered to cede five provinces in a peace proposal to Hashiba Hideyoshi. The nearly decade-long Ishiyama Hongan-ji War had already ended with the defeat of the Ikkō-ikki.

It was at this point that Nobunaga began sending his generals aggressively in all directions to continue his military expansion. Nobunaga ordered Hashiba Hideyoshi to attack the Mōri clan in the Chūgoku region; Niwa Nagahide to prepare for an invasion of Shikoku; Takigawa Kazumasu to watch the Hōjō clan from Kōzuke Province and Shinano Province; and Shibata Katsuie to invade Echigo Province, the home domain of the Uesugi clan.

Nobunaga, who was confident of unifying the country after destroying the Takeda clan, returned to Azuchi in high spirits. Tokugawa Ieyasu went to Azuchi Castle to thank Nobunaga for giving him the Suruga province. However, around this time, the Mōri clan launched a large-scale counteroffensive in the Chūgoku region, and Nobunaga received a request for reinforcements from Hashiba Hideyoshi, whose forces were stuck besieging the Mōri-controlled Takamatsu Castle.

Nobunaga immediately ordered Akechi Mitsuhide to go to the Chūgoku region to support Hideyoshi, and he himself followed soon after. Nobunaga began his preparations and headed for Honnō-ji in Kyoto, his usual resting place when he stopped by the capital.

Nobunaga was unprotected at Honnō-ji, deep within his territory, with the only people he had around him being court officials, merchants, upper-class artists, and dozens of servants. He had dispatched most of his soldiers to take part in various campaigns, with only a small force left to protect himself. There was little fear that anyone would dare strike Nobunaga; taking advantage of the weak security measures, Mitsuhide suddenly turned against his master.

== Mitsuhide's betrayal ==
Upon receiving the order, Mitsuhide returned to Sakamoto Castle and moved to his base in Tanba Province. He engaged in a session of renga with several prominent poets, using the opportunity to make clear his intentions of rising against Nobunaga. Mitsuhide saw an opportunity to act when Nobunaga was not only resting in Honnō-ji and unprepared for an attack, but all the other major daimyō and the bulk of Nobunaga's army were occupied in other parts of the country. Mitsuhide led his army toward Kyoto under the order of Nobunaga. It was not the first time that Nobunaga had demonstrated his modernized and well-equipped troops in Kyoto, so Mitsuhide's men marching toward Kyoto did not raise any suspicion. Before dawn, Mitsuhide, leading 13,000 soldiers, suddenly changed course in the middle of his march and attacked Honnō-ji, where Nobunaga was staying.

There's a legend that when crossing the Katsura River, Mitsuhide announced to his troops that "The enemy awaits at Honnō-ji!" (敵は本能寺にあり, Teki wa Honnō-ji ni ari). However, this story first appeared in Oda Nobunaga-fu (織田信長譜) by Hayashi Razan (1583–1657) then in Nihon Gaishi by Rai San'yō, a kangakusha of the late Edo period, and is most likely a creation, not a statement by Mitsuhide himself. According to Luís Fróis's "History of Japan" and testimonies from surviving soldiers, Mitsuhide was only the commander of the Oda army's area forces, and since it was the Oda clan to whom the soldiers owed allegiance, he did not reveal his purpose to anyone except his officers, fearing that informants might appear. Even when the attack actually began, the soldiers did not know who they were attacking, and some thought it was Ieyasu.

=== Chronology of the incident ===
The situation at the time was recorded by Gyū-ichi Ota, the author of "Shinchō Kōki", who interviewed the ladies-in-waiting who were at the scene soon after the incident.

Nobunaga had come to Kyoto to support Hashiba Hideyoshi and stayed at Honnō-ji on this day. This was because Nobunaga had avoided building a castle in Kyoto so that he could maintain distance from the Imperial Court. Nobunaga had ordered his generals to go into battle, so only about 150 men were escorting him at Honnō-ji. Akechi Mitsuhide was leading 13,000 fully armed soldiers, creating a perfect opportunity for Mitsuhide to attack Honnō-ji. Honnō-ji was a fortified temple with stone walls and a moat, and it had a reasonable defense capability, but it was helpless when surrounded by a large army.

On that day, Kyoto seemed to be in the midst of bad weather due to the combination of abnormal weather and the rainy season. The attack began early in the morning. Mitsuhide's forces finished encircling Honnō-ji around 6:00 a.m. and began to invade the temple from all sides.

According to Shinchō Kōki, Nobunaga and the pages at first thought that someone had started a fight in the street. But when the enemy raised a battle cry and started shooting, they realized it was a rebellion. Nobunaga asked, "Whose scheme is this?", and Mori Ranmaru replied, "It appears to be Akechi's". Nobunaga did not ask back, but simply said, "There is no need to discuss the pros and cons. There is no choice." (是非に及ばず, Zehi ni oyobazu), and began to fight back with bows and arrows at the edge of the palace. When his bowstring broke, he kept shooting arrows while changing bows, and when he ran out of spare bows, he fought with his spear. When Nobunaga was eventually unable to fight after being hit in the elbow by an enemy spear, he retreated and told the nyōbō-shū (Note: Court ladies.) there, "I don't care, you ladies hurry up and get out of here". It was said that Nobunaga then entered the back room of the palace, closed the door of the storage room, and committed seppuku in the burning temple. The Akechi forces lifted the siege around 8:00 a.m.

Meanwhile, Oda Nobutada, who was at Myōkaku-ji Temple, received news of Mitsuhide's rebellion and attempted to go to Honnō-ji to rescue his father. However, as he was leaving the temple, Murai Sadakatsu and his sons stopped him. Murai said that Honnō-ji had already burned down and the enemy would soon attack us, and advised Nobutada to hunker down in the fortified Nijō Gosho. Upon entering the Nijō Gosho, Nobutada ordered Maeda Geni to flee with his infant son, Sanpōshi (Oda Hidenobu), going from Gifu Castle in Mino to Kiyosu Castle in Owari. Nobutada had all the people escape, including the kugyō and the nyōbō-shū, and then he began his war council. Some advised Nobutada to escape and head for Azuchi, but he said, "An enemy who has committed such a rebellion will not let us escape so easily. It would be a disgrace for me to be killed by common soldiers while fleeing", and decided to stay in Kyoto and fight. In the meantime, Akechi forces completed the siege of Nijō Gosho, making it impossible to escape. Later, Nobutada committed seppuku. Kamata Shinsuke, who assisted Nobutada in his suicide, hid his head and body according to his instructions.

== Aftermath ==
Akechi Mitsuhide was eager to find Nobunaga's body in the burnt ruins of Honnō-ji, but he was unable to locate it. Due to Nobunaga's body remaining undiscovered, no one knew if he was alive or dead, which created a problem for Mitsuhide. Even though the fate of Nobunaga was uncertain, if there was even a chance he was alive, Mitsuhide was more likely to be defeated. It was incredibly difficult for Mitsuhide to gain support from people who feared Nobunaga's retaliation. Hideyoshi even sent a letter to Nobunaga's vassals claiming that Nobunaga was still alive in order to persuade them to help defeat Mitsuhide. However, if Mitsuhide obtained Nobunaga's head, he could publicly confirm his death and encourage forces to join his side. Meanwhile, Mitsuhide was also using the death of Nobunaga to persuade Oda's vassals around Kyoto to respect his authority. Then, Mitsuhide used Nobunaga's Azuchi Castle east of Kyoto to begin sending messages to the Imperial Court. Mitsuhide was attempting to use these messages to increase his rank and force other members of the Imperial Court to respect him; however, no one responded.

Hashiba Hideyoshi received the first news the day after the incident. Hideyoshi responded by immediately making peace with the Mōri clan, attempting to keep Nobunaga's death under wraps, and returning to the Kinai region with a forced and incredibly fast type of march known as Chūgoku Ōgaeshi (the Great Return from the Chugoku Region). He returned in roughly a week with an army of nearly 30,000 troops over 200 km. Hideyoshi also joined forces with Niwa Nagahide and Oda Nobutaka in Osaka and headed for Kyoto. Using this momentum, Hideyoshi defeated Mitsuhide in the Battle of Yamazaki, and while on the run, Mitsuhide was killed due to an ochimushagari. (Note: A medieval Japanese custom in which local samurai, farmers, and bandits hunt fleeing samurai for bounty and the valuables they wear.)

The Kiyosu Conference was then held to determine the successor to the Oda clan, consisting of four vassals of the Oda clan, Shibata Katsuie, Niwa Nagahide, Ikeda Tsuneoki, and Hashiba Hideyoshi. Three possible successors were discussed; Nobukatsu, the second son; Nobutaka, the third son; and Hidenobu (Sanhōshi), Nobutada's eldest son, or Nobunaga's three-year-old grandson.

=== Nobunaga's corpse ===
After defeating Mitsuhide, Hideyoshi searched for Nobunaga's body but was unable to locate it. In October 1582, Hideyoshi held Nobunaga's funeral at Daitoku-ji Temple in Kyoto. To represent his missing body, Hideyoshi used a life-size wooden statue of Nobunaga, then cremated and put the ashes in an urn.

Without any doubt, the thing Nobunaga feared most while preparing to die was not death, but how his body would be treated. Nobunaga must have understood that if his body had fallen into Mitsuhide's hands, his severed head would surely have been gibbeted, disgraced as a criminal, and that Mitsuhide would use Nobunaga's death as public justification for his rebellion. In case of such a situation, Nobunaga came up with some solutions. He could have had his body cremated so that it could not be identified; instead, he could be buried outside Honnō-ji, or he would have someone he trusts carry it away from the temple, even though Mitsuhide could steal it on the way to a new burial site. There are several theories regarding why no bodies were found in the burnt ruins of Honnō-ji. One theory is that Nobunaga could not be identified due to the bodies being unrecognizable; another theory is that there were simply too many bodies, and a third theory was that the fire was so intense that his body was completely consumed by the flames. (Note: The missionary Luis Frois wrote in his "History of Japan" that even the bones were burned to ashes.)

There are also several stories claiming that Nobunaga's body and head were carried out of Honnō-ji. There are a large number of tombs in various parts of Japan said to be Nobunaga's, but there is no evidence of his remains lying inside.

== Tokugawa's escape to Mikawa ==
When Tokugawa Ieyasu heard the news in Hirakata, Osaka, he only had a few companions with him. Ieyasu and his party chose the shortest route back to Mikawa Province by crossing Iga Province despite the danger posed on that route by groups of peasants engaging in ochimusha-gari, a practice of hunting warriors who were cut off from their main force. While it was claimed that such groups were formed for self-defense, in reality, they often robbed and killed defeated samurai or soldiers during conflicts.

Accounts of Ieyasu's journey to Mikawa vary across primary sources such as the Tokugawa Nikki and Mikawa Todai-Hon:

- The Tokugawa Nikki theory stated that Ieyasu took the roads to Shijonawate and Son'enji and then followed the stream of the Kizu river until they spent the night at Yamaguchi castle. The next day, they reached a stronghold of the Kōka ikki clan of the Tarao, who allowed them to take refuge for the night. Then on the last day, the Ieyasu group used a ship from Shiroko to reach Okazaki Castle. However, the Tokugawa Nikki theory was doubted by modern historians, since it was not the shortest route for Ieyasu to reach Mikawa from his starting position at Sakai, while on the other hand, it was also considered by historians as a very risky path due to the existence of Iga ikki groups, which were hostile to the Oda and Tokugawa clans.
- The Mikawa Toda-Hon stated that Ieyasu went north from Ogawadate, crossed Koka, and entered Seishu Seki (from Shigaraki, passed through Aburahi, and entered Tsuge in Iga). This theory was supported by Modern Japanese historians such as Tatsuo Fujita from Mie University, who takes this material to formulate three different theories about the details of Ieyasu's trek that he propagated. This theory is also supported by a group of historians of Mie city, who happened to be the descendants of the Kōka ikki clans. They stated that by taking this path, before Ieyasu's group reached the Kada pass, where they could be escorted by the Kōka clan Jizamurai, Ieyasu mostly depended on protection from his high-ranking vassals, particularly the four Shitennō (Tokugawa clan) generals of the Tokugawa clan, rather than the popular theory about the help of the "Iga Ninja" clans. In 2023, during the conference of the "International Ninja Society" at Chubu Centrair International Airport, a passionate debate occurred which involved Chris Glenn (a D.J. and Japanese history enthusiast and author), Uejima Hidetomo (a history book author from Nara), Watanabe Toshitsune (former chairman of the Koga Ninjutsu Research Society), and Sakae Okamoto (Mayor of Iga city). At this conference, Toshitsune challenged the common theory about the Iga route, advanced by Hidetomo, who argued that Ieyasu took the Kōka route, which he viewed as more plausible.

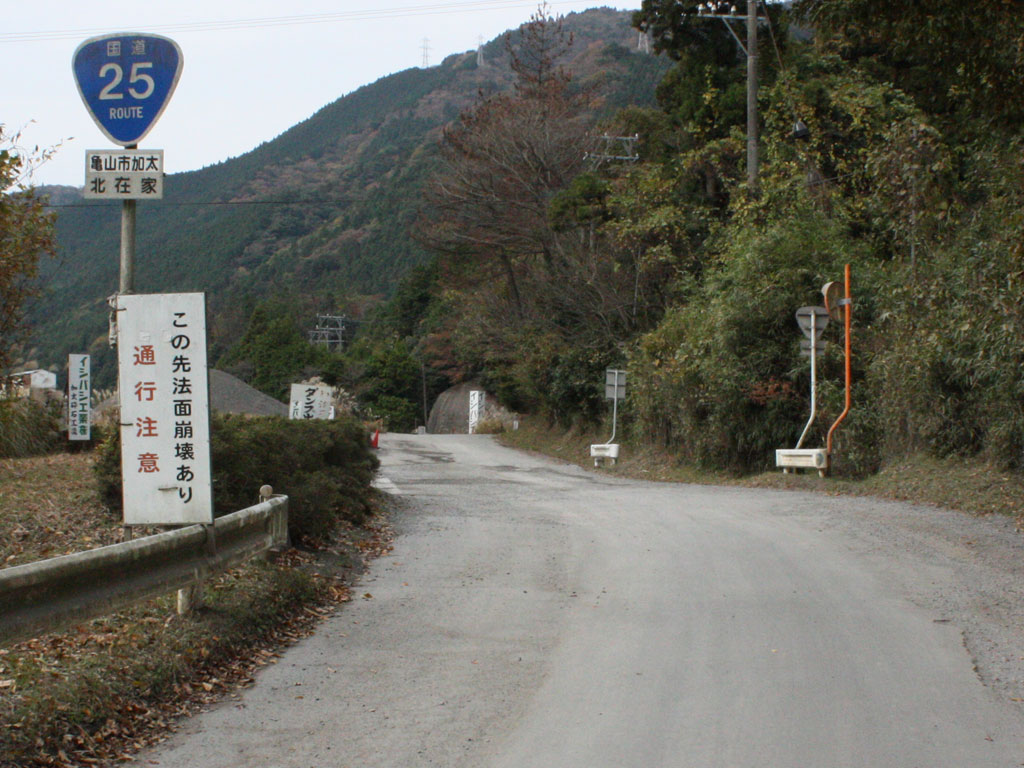
Kada Pass is believed to be the road that was taken by Ieyasu Tokugawa to return to Mikawa province.

Regardless of which theory is true, historians agree that the track ended at Kada (a mountain pass between Kameyama town and Iga), and that the Tokugawa group suffered a last attack by the Ochimusha-gari outlaws at the Kada pass, where they reached the territory of the Kōka ikki clans of Jizamurai, which were friendly to the Tokugawa clan. The Koka Ikki Jizamurai assisted Ieyasu in eliminating the threats of the Ochimusha-gari outlaws and escorted them until they reached Iga Province, where they were further protected by other friendly groups of Iga ikki, which accompanied the Ieyasu group until they safely reached Mikawa. 34 recorded Tokugawa vassals survived this journey, such as Sakai Tadatsugu, Ii Naomasa, Honda Tadakatsu, Sakakibara Yasumasa, and many others. Other than those four Shitennō generals, Matsudaira Ietada recorded in his journal, Ietada nikki (家忠日記), the escorts of Ieyasu during the journey in Iga consisted of:

- Ishikawa Kazumasa
- Honda Masamori
- Ishikawa Yasumichi
- Hattori Masanari
- Hiromasa Takagi
- Torii Tadamasa
- Suganuma Sadamitsu
- Hisano shūchō
- Honda Nobutoshi
- Abe Masakatsu
- Makino Yasunari
- Miyake Masatsugu
- Kōriki Kiyonaga
- Ōkubo Tadasuke
- Watanabe Moritsuna
- Naruse Masatora
- Tada Miyoshi
- Hanai Yoshitaka
- Torii Omatsu
- Naitō Shingorō
- Tsudzuki Kamezō
- Matsudaira Harushige
- Suganuma Sadatoshi
- Nagai Naokatsu
- Nagata Sebei
- Matsushita Mitsutsuna
- Tsuzuki Chozaburo
- Miura Okame
- Aoki Chōzaburō
- Ōkubo Tadachika

Ietada Nikki also recorded that the escorts of Ieyasu suffered around 200 casualties during their journey.

However, not all of the escaping parties managed to escape alive. Anayama Nobutada, a former Twenty-Four Generals of Takeda Shingen member who was now an ally to the Tokugawa and Nobunaga clan, was ambushed by the Ochimusha-gari during the journey, and killed along with some of his retainers.

=== Iga Ninja theory's controversy ===
It was reported by Edo-period traditional records that Hattori Hanzō, a Tokugawa vassal from Iga, negotiated with Iga ninjas to hire them as guards along the way to avoid the ochimusha-gari. The local Koka-Ikki ninjas and Iga-Ikki ninjas under Hanzo, who helped Ieyasu to travel to safety, consisted of 300 ninjas. Furthermore, Uejima Hidetomo, a researcher of Iga Ninja history, has stated that there is research that revealed that Hattori Yasuji, one of the ninjas who accompanied Ieyasu on his journey in Iga province, also served as a bodyguard and espionage officer under Muromachi Shogun Ashikaga Yoshiaki.

However, a modern scholar such as Tatsuo Fujita doubted the credibility of Hattori Hanzō's ninja army theory, since it first appeared in the Iga-sha yuishogaki record, which circulated in the Edo period during the rule of Shogun Tokugawa Yoshimune. During his rule, Yoshimune was known for establishing the Oniwaban secret police institution, whose members hailed from the confederation clans of Koka and Iga. It has been argued that the circulation of the myth about Hattori Hanzō's ninja army helping Ieyasu was created as propaganda to increase the prestige of the Iga and Koka clan confederations in the Tokugawa Shogunate.

On the other hand, Chaya Shirōjirō, a wealthy merchant in Kyoto, wrote that he went ahead and gave silver coins to local people and asked them to guide and escort the group, an account that also appears in Jesuit historical documents of the same period. However, the existence of Chaya Shirōjirō during this period itself is also doubted by historians, since it was recorded that Shirōjirō was born in 1600, so it was unlikely he existed during Ieyasu's travels in Iga province in 1582.

== Mitsuhide's betrayal theories ==
The Honnō-ji Incident is a major historical event, but no definitive conclusion has been reached regarding Akechi Mitsuhide's motives, and the truth remains unknown. More than 50 theories have been proposed over the years, and new theories emerge with each discovery of a new historical document or announcement of the results of an excavation.

=== Betrayal motivation ===
There are several theories regarding the motivation of the betrayal:

- Mitsuhide was abused by Nobunaga, including being humiliated and dismissed as a host for a visit of Tokugawa Ieyasu. (Note: In the "History of Japan" compiled by Luís Fróis, it is suggested that this is because Nobunaga, who did not like Mitsuhide's reception of Tokugawa Ieyasu, gave him a kick.) The prevailing theory during the Edo period was that the incident was caused by Mitsuhide's resentment of various unreasonable punishments he received from Nobunaga. The main reasons were as follows. However, historian Tetsuo Owada considered such history, including Mitsuhide's alleged letter to Kobayakawa Takakage expressing his feelings about Nobunaga, as unreliable.
- Nobunaga had treated him unfairly. His fiefdom in the San'in region was unilaterally confiscated. Such a theory includes the indication of preferential treatment for Oda Nobunaga's relatives. The theory is that Mitsuhide felt threatened by the fact that Nobunaga, who had previously adopted a merit-based system for his vassals and had appointed them according to their abilities regardless of their origins, began to favor his relatives. Furthermore, some theorize that Nobunaga forcibly transferred Mitsuhide from his territorial control of Sakamoto and Tanba into the yet-to-be-conquered regions of Izumo and Iwami. However, this theory was also dismissed by Owada as it was a usual custom for Nobunaga to bestow non-pacified territories to his vassals as a promise.
- His mother, who was a hostage of the Hatano clan, was killed because of Nobunaga. During the siege of Yakami Castle in 1579, Mitsuhide offered his mother as hostage to the Hatano clan, in an effort to convince Hatano Hideharu to submit to Nobunaga. However, Nobunaga instead executed Hideharu and his brother by crucifixion, prompting the Hatano clan to retaliate by crucifying Mitsuhide's mother in response. However, there is no such mention in "Nobunaga Koki," a primary source. According to the book, Mitsuhide besieged Yakami Castle for a year, starving the enemy, and eventually captured the three Hatano brothers, but there is no mention of his mother being crucified afterwards. Furthermore, recent research has shown that she had died of natural causes before the siege of Yakami. Modern historian Watanabe Daimon explained that this theory was traced from Toyama Nobuharu's work "Sōkenki" written around 1658; "Kashiwazaki Monogatari"; and also "Nobunaga-ki" (Shinchō Kōki); which Daimon also doubted their credibility due to many embellishments and additions that were not found in the primary sources.

Thus, these stories were largely deemed by historians as unreliable, including the story of Mitsuhide's betrayal from "Akechi-gunki" and "Kōyō Gunkan".

Other new theories from 20th-century historians, which involve the Ashikaga Shogunate, also emerged:

- A theory emerged that Mitsuhide was a loyalist to the imperial court or a shogunate vassal of the Ashikaga shogunate. Historian Kuwata Tadachika put forth the reason that Mitsuhide had a personal grudge, and there was another theory that Mitsuhide did not enjoy the cruelty of Nobunaga. Another indication was when Mitsuhide began his march toward Chugoku, he held a renga session at the shrine on Mount Atago. The beginning line, Toki wa ima, ame ga shita shiru satsuki kana (時は今 雨がした滴る皐月かな), translates to "The time is now, the fifth month when the rain falls." However, there are several homonyms in the line, such that it could be taken as a double entendre. An alternate meaning, without changing any of the pronunciations, would be: 時は今 天が下治る 皐月かな. Thus, it has also been translated as "Now is the time to rule the world: It's the fifth month!" In this case, the word toki, which means "time" in the first version, sounds identical to Akechi's ancestral family name, "Toki" (土岐).
- Ashikaga Shogunate restoration, Tatsuo Fujita points out that Mitsuhide's handwritten letter addressed to the Kishu daimyo named Shigeharu Dobashi shows that Mitsuhide had a clear plan to welcome Yoshiaki to Kyoto after the Honnoji Incident and restore the Muromachi Shogunate.

=== Alleged collaborators ===
The mastermind theory that someone behind the incident manipulated Mitsuhide to carry out Nobunaga's assassination is surprisingly new and has emerged since the 1990s. It all started when the well-known historian who specialized in Japanese medieval history, Akira Imatani, published a book advocating a conflict between the Imperial Court and Nobunaga. The theory is that the existence of an emperor with high authority was becoming a hindrance to Nobunaga, who wanted to be an absolute monarch. At the time, when the new emperor was about to ascend to the throne, the emperor system was the subject of much debate in the historical academia. Although Imatani himself did not claim that the Imperial Court was involved in the Honnō-ji Incident, various conspiracy theories were developed, mainly by influential historical researchers who were inspired by Imatani's theory.

There are several theories about the collaborator of Mitsuhide's act in Honnō-ji:

- Hashiba (Toyotomi) Hideyoshi theory
  - The reason is that Hideyoshi's Chugoku Ogaeshi was too fast. However, only the cavalry warriors were able to turn back at breakneck speed, and the infantry arrived late. Many of the soldiers did not make it in time for the "Battle of Yamazaki" with Mitsuhide. While it might be a stretch to designate Hideyoshi as the mastermind, many historians have pointed out the strong possibility that he anticipated this situation.
- Tokugawa Ieyasu theory
  - The reason is: "Nobunaga, who was on the verge of unifying the country, felt that Ieyasu, his ally, stood in his way. He planned to kill Ieyasu first. However, Mitsuhide, who was becoming increasingly dissatisfied with Nobunaga's policies, conversely informed Ieyasu of the plot and drew him into his side, thus killing Nobunaga by surprise." It is a leap of faith to assume that Mitsuhide and Ieyasu, who had not interacted with each other before, were able to conspire in Nobunaga's city, Azuchi Castle Town, and there is no historical support for this idea.
- Ankokuji Ekei (the Mōri) theory
  - The theory is that Ankokuji Ekei, a diplomatic monk of the Mōri, who was facing an existential crisis as Nobunaga himself was about to launch a full-scale offensive, arranged for Nobunaga's assassination on condition of the Mōri's full cooperation with Mitsuhide and Hideyoshi, and had it carried out.
- Buddhist power theory
  - The theory that Buddhist powers such as Hiei-zan Enryaku-ji and Ishiyama Hongan-ji, which were suppressed by Nobunaga and held a strong grudge against him, were the masterminds behind the situation.
- Imperial Court/Kuge power theory
  - This is the theory that Prince Masahito, Konoe Sakihisa, Yoshida Kanemi, and others forced Mitsuhide to defeat Nobunaga because Nobunaga forced Emperor Ōgimachi to abdicate. In reality, however, the Imperial Court was rather desperate to curry the favor of its sponsor, Nobunaga, since Nobunaga's financial support had dramatically improved its financial situation, which was in danger. Emperor Ōgimachi was also unable to abdicate due to a lack of funding for the abdication ceremony.
- Ashikaga Shogun (Muromachi Shogunate) theory
  - The theory is that Ashikaga Yoshiaki, the 15th shogun, exiled by Nobunaga, formed an anti-Nobunaga alliance with Mori Terumoto, Uesugi Kagakatsu, and other powerful Daimyo, and forced Mitsuhide to stage a coup d'état. However, the Shogun did not have much authority at the time, and Uesugi and Mori did not cooperate with Akechi.
- Jesuit theory
  - The theory is that the Jesuits of the Catholic Church, who dispatched missionaries to Japan, were the masterminds. The Jesuits supported Nobunaga militarily and economically, and Nobunaga also protected Christianity, but Nobunaga tried to become independent from the Jesuits by deifying himself, so the Jesuits had Mitsuhide defeat Nobunaga and then had Hashiba (Toyotomi) Hideyoshi defeat Mitsuhide, according to this theory. However, while it is true that Nobunaga protected Christianity, there is no historical record of the Jesuits assisting Nobunaga on either the Japanese or Jesuit side, and in fact, the finances of the Japanese branch of the Jesuits were so tight that they could not afford to do so.

In the 2010s, a Shikoku theory was proposed that Mitsuhide, who valued his relationship with Chōsokabe Motochika, rose up to avoid Nobunaga's attack on Shikoku. Mitsuhide was entrusted by Nobunaga to negotiate with Chōsokabe, and the Akechi family and Chōsokabe had deep ties in relation to marriage. In 2020, NHK aired a program called "Honnoji Incident Summit 2020". Seven historians debated various theories, with the "Shikoku theory" garnering the most support.

== In popular culture ==
- Honnōji Hotel is a 2017 comedy mystery drama that takes place around the Honnō-ji Incident.
- The incident is closely portrayed in the first act of the 2025 video game Assassin's Creed Shadows.

== See also ==
- Tainei-ji incident – a similar coup in 1551, where a powerful daimyō of western Japan was forced to commit suicide

== Appendix ==
=== Bibliography ===
- de Lange, William (2020). Samurai Battles: The Long Road to Unification. Toyo Press. ISBN 9789492722232.
- Naramoto Tatsuya (1994). Nihon no Kassen. Tokyo: Shufu to Seikatsusha.
