= Tenshō-Jingo war =

1582 battle in Japan

- Part of Sengoku period
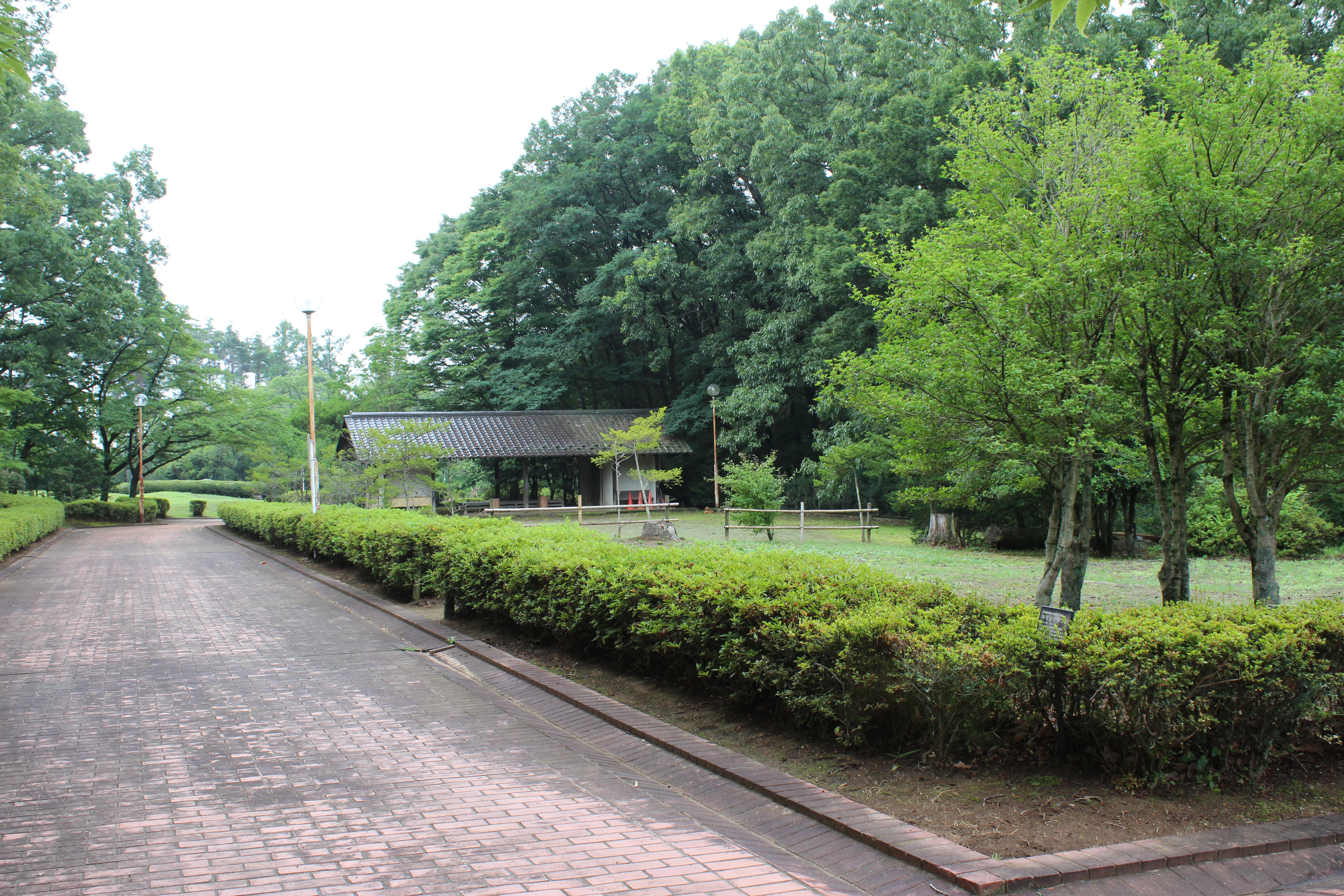
- Ruins of Wakamiko castle, the site where of Hōjō army faced Tokugawa army in a stalemate during the conflict.
Date	June 1582 – February 10, 1583
Location	Kai Province; Shinano Province; Kōzuke Province; Izu Province, Shizuoka Prefecture
Result	Truce between Tokugawa and Hōjō clan; Tokugawa clan gains significant portions of Kai and Shinano provinces; Uesugi clan withdrawn from the conflict

Belligerents
Hōjō clan Satomi clan	Tokugawa clan Oda clan	Uesugi clan

Commanders and leaders
Hōjō Ujinao; Hōjō Ujimasa; Hōjō Ujikatsu; Daidōji Masashige Satomi clan: Satomi Yoshiyori Former Takeda clan: Hoshina Masatoshi (Hōjō → Tokugawa); Hoshina Masanao (Hōjō → Tokugawa); Kiso Yoshimasa (Hōjō → Tokugawa); Obata Nobusada (Hōjō → Tokugawa)	Tokugawa Ieyasu; Sakai Tadatsugu; Torii Mototada; Ii Naomasa; Ōkubo Tadayo; Sakakibara Yasumasa; Mizuno Katsunari; Hattori Hanzō; Honda Shigetsugu Oda clan: Kawajiri Hidetaka †; Takigawa Kazumasu (Battle of Kanagawa) Former Takeda clan: Yoda Nobushige; Sone Masatada; Okabe Masatsuna	Uesugi Kagekatsu; Ogasawara Dōsetsusai Former Takeda clan: Sanada Masayuki (Uesugi → Hōjō → Tokugawa); Sanada Nobuyuki (Uesugi → Hōjō → Tokugawa); Sanada Nobutada (Uesugi → Hōjō → Tokugawa)

Strength
55,000 (Hōjō army); 10,000 (Satomi army)	8,000 (Tokugawa army); 3,800–3,900 (Former Takeda clan warriors)	Unknown

Casualties and losses
Unclear; Battle of Kurokoma: 300	Unclear	Unclear

Tenshō-Jingo war

Japanese name
- Kanji: 天正壬午の乱
- Hiragana: てんしょうじんごのらん
Transcriptions
- Romanization: Tenshō-Jingo no ran

Tenshō-Jingo War (天正壬午の乱, Tenshō-Jingo no ran) or more simply, the Battle of Jingo (壬午の役, Jingo no eki), (Note: The name of "Tenshō-Jingo War" was coined by Tashiro Takashi in 1980.) was a three-way military conflict in 1582 AD (10th year of Tenshō) between Hōjō clan, Tokugawa clan, and Uesugi clan.

The conflict occurred due to the three clans' bid to gain control of former Takeda clan territories at Kai, Kōzuke, and Shinano province post Oda Nobunaga's death. The conflict ended with peace negotiation in 1583 with the Hōjō clan sent Hōjō Ujinobu as representative, while the Tokugawa sent Ii Naomasa as representative

== Background ==
In 1582, after the extermination of Takeda clan in Kai Province at the battle of Tenmokuzan, Nobunaga gave Ieyasu the right to govern Suruga Province in recognition of his service in the fight against the Takeda clan.

However, soon enough Oda Nobunaga was assassinated at Honnō-ji, a temple in Kyoto, on 21 June 1582 (2nd day of the sixth month, Tenshō 10), by his own vassal Akechi Mitsuhide. Tokugawa Ieyasu, Nobunaga's ally, heard the news of The death of Oda Nobunaga while he was at Hirakata, Osaka, but at the time, he had only a few companions with him.

The Tokugawa group escaped the chaos through Kada Pass, where they reached the territory of the friendly Kōka ikki clans of Jizamurai. The Koka ikki assisted Ieyasu in eliminating the threats of the Ochimusha-gari outlaws and escorted them until they reached Iga Province, where they were further protected by other friendly groups of Iga ikki which accompanied the Ieyasu group until they safely reached Mikawa. After Ieyasu reached Mikawa, he immediately moved to shift his focus to former Takeda clan territory as he expected unrest there. As a preemptive measure, Ieyasu dispatched Honda Nobutoshi to contact Kawajiri Hidetaka, who ruled Suwa District as a vassal of the Oda clan, to request cooperation, While at that moment, ex Takeda clan vassal Yoda Nobushige pledges his allegiance to Ieyasu.

At the same time, Uesugi and the Hōjō clans also mobilized their forces to invade Shinano Province, Kōzuke Province, and Kai Province (currently Gunma Prefecture), which were ruled by the remnants of the many small clans that formerly served the Takeda clan, when they learned of the death of Nobunaga. This caused a triangular conflict between those three factions.

== Preliminary movements ==
At first, the Hōjō clan, who ruled the Kantō region, led an army of 55,000 men to invade the Shinano Province through Usui, as they aimed to prevent a Tokugawa incursion of Kai.

On June 5, Kawajiri Hidetaka instructed Yonekura Tadatsugu and Orii Tsugumasa to work to get the Kai warriors to join the Tokugawa side and to wait for Ieyasu to invade Kai.

Following this, Ieyasu also transmit similar instructiom for Orii Tsugumasa and Yonekura Tadatsugu, who both hailed from Takekawa clan of Kai province and hiding in Kiriyama, Tōtōmi Province, to proceed with the work of enticing the Kai samurai to the Tokugawa side. The next day, Ieyasu also sent a letter to Masatsuna instructing him to begin the construction of a castle at Shimoyama, Minobu Town in the Kai Kawachi domain, the former base of Anayama Nobutada, one of Tokugawa's retainers who was killed by outlaws during his escape after the Honnō-ji Incident. Suganuma Castle (Terazawa, Minobu Town) was built along the Fuji River and the Suruga Highway (Kawachi Road). After the death of Nobutada and the senior members of the Obikane clan, to which they had pledged loyalty, the Anayama clan was left leaderless, so they decided to pledge allegiance to Ieyasu.

== Conflict chronology ==
Ieyasu immediately marched his 8,000 soldiers to the disputed regions and then split his army into two parts, with the separate detachment led by Sakai Tadatsugu and Ogasawara Nobumine going to pacify the Shinano Province, while Ieyasu took the main force to pacify Kai. Tadatsugu and Nobumine met with unexpected resistance from Suwa Yoritada, a former Takeda vassal who was now allied with the Hōjō clan. (Note: According to the "Tales of Mikawa," Tokugawa's senior vassal, Sakai Tadatsugu, came to Shinano to win over the Shinano clan, but when he publicly declared, "If you give me Shinano, I will also subdue Suwa Yoritada," the Suwa clan became angry and sided with the Hojo clan.)

Tadatsugu's force then beaten by Yoritada, who were then reinforced by the Hōjō clan, forcing Tadatsugu to retreat. As Tadatsugu's forces retreated, they were pursued by 43,000 men of the Hōjō clan army. Okabe Masatsuna, a member of the Suruga clan samurai who once served under Baba Nobuharu, took the initiative to defend the rear of Tadatsugu's army from the enemy charges and repelled them. As they successfully retreated without further losses, they rejoined Ieyasu's main forces in the area of Wakamiko in Suwamachi (modern day Yamanashi Prefecture). Ieyasu then dispatched Sone Masatada, formerly one of Shingen Takeda's three most prominent generals, (Note: the other two were said to be Yamagata Masakage and Sanada Masayuki.) to the Erinji area with 500 men to confront a Hōjō force that numbered 3,000 men. Masatada managed to defeat them and inflicted between 600 and 700 casualties.

On April 3, Oda Nobukatsu wrote to Ieyasu about the situation at Ise Province, while Ieyasu reported that he had pacified the Ogata and Saku District, Shinano Province. The two maintained close contact from then.

By 11 June, the Hōjō started constructing Misaka Castle at Fujinoki, Misaka-cho, Fuefuki City, or in Kawaguchi, Minamitsuru District, Yamanashi In June 12, Masatada joined forces with another former Takeda vassal, Okabe Masatsuna, and a senior Tokugawa general, Osuga Yasutaka. The same day, Yoda Nobushige set off to Saku District and rallied around 3,000 Takeda clan retainers as Ieyasu instructed. Several days later, Osuga Yasutaka, a senior Tokugawa vassal, inspected Masatada's troops, where he commended the cooperation of Masatada lieutenant, Kubota Masakatsu. By June 13, the Hōjō clan had captured Iwadono Castle in Tsuru District and instructed Watanabe Shozaemon, a local magistrate from the Tsuru District, to assist them in their conquest. Subsequently, Sanada Masayuki led his army and captured the Numata Castle for the Uesugi clan.

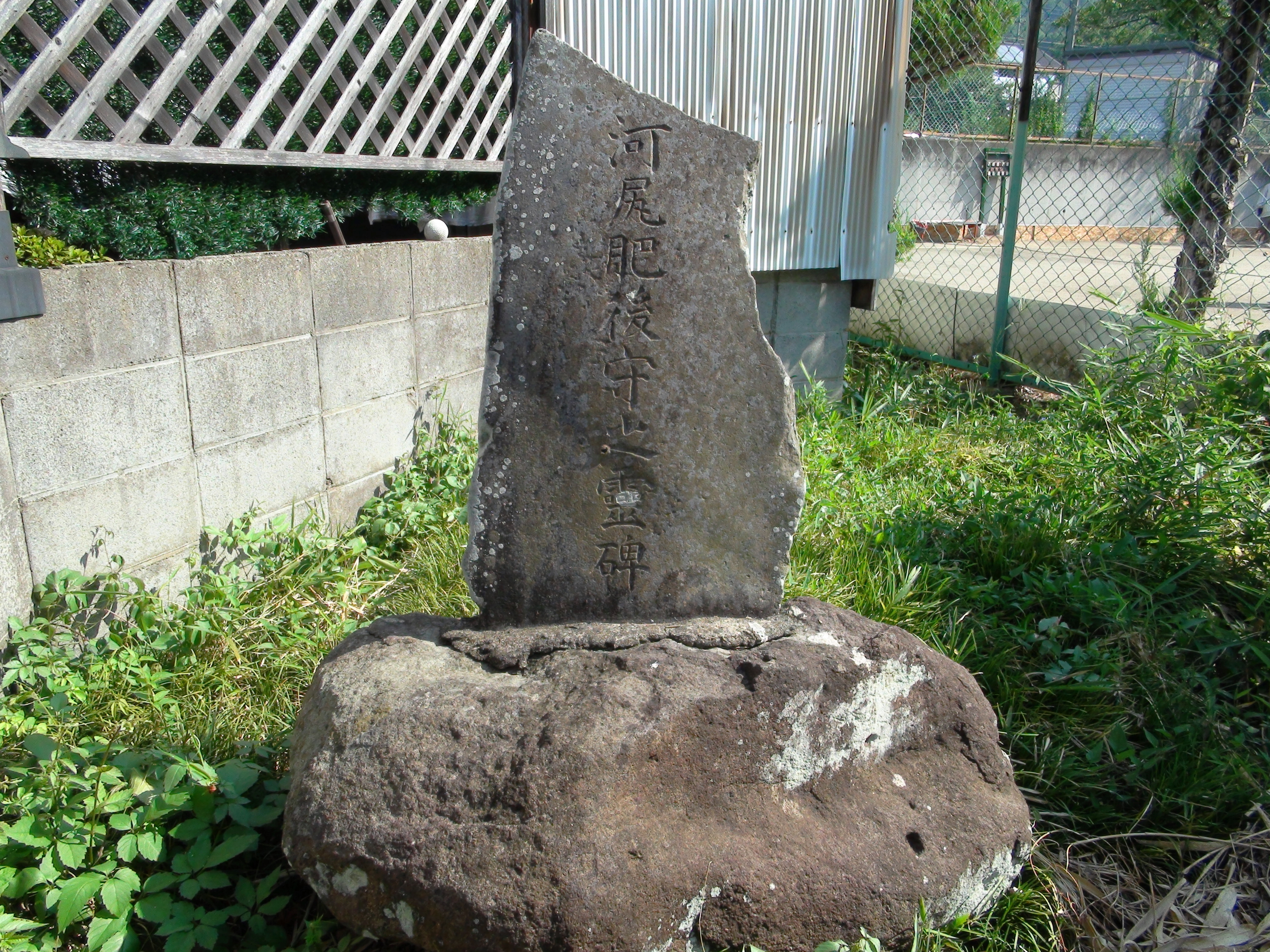
Tomb of Hidetaka Kawajiri, where his body was said to be buried upside-down.

On June 14 however, Kawajiri Hidetaka killed Honda Nobutoshi. This was followed by an uprising from many of the clans in Kai province against Hidetaka the following day, which resulted in Hidetaka being killed on June 18. It is said that after his death, Hidetaka's body was buried in unusual way, upside down with his head at the bottom. This was because his tyrannical rule in Kai Province made its people despise him so much. For this reason, Kawajirizuka, which is believed to be his grave, is also known as Sakasazuka.

As the triangular battle was underway between the three factions, order was restored in Owari province as the rebellion of Akechi Mitsuhide had already been suppressed in the Battle of Yamazaki. Ieyasu also informed the Oda clan of the developments in Shinano and Kai. On 19 June, Hideyoshi informed Ieyasu that order in Kamigata area has been restored as there is nothing to be worried About. In response, Ieyasu return to Hamamatsu. Meanwhile, Takigawa Kazumasu also defeated by Hōjō Ujinao at the battle of Kanagawa.

Later, the Hōjō also gained support from the Hoshina clan, which was a former Takeda vassal, led by Hoshina Masatoshi and his sons Hoshina Masanao and Naitō Masaaki. On the other hand, the Tokugawa clan gained support from the Tomohisa clan. (Note: The Tomohisa clan was a powerful clan that ruled the Ryuto area (left bank of the Tenryu River) in Shimoina during the medieval era. They were originally from Chikuzawa (modern day Minowa Town, Kamiina District, Nagano) and were said to be one of the branches of the Suwa clan. During the Tensho-Jingo war, the Tomohisa was the ruler of Chikudaira Castle, located in Chikudaira, Shimo-Kuken, Iida City.)

=== Uesugi clan's movement ===
Uesugi Kagekatsu of the Uesugi clan also made his move by supporting former Takeda clan forces under the leadership of Ogasawara Dōsetsusai from the Ogasawara clan and Yashiro Hidemasa at Chikuma and the Nishina clan of Azumino. They defeated and expelled Kiso Yoshimasa, who had been granted the control of both Chikuma and Azumino by Oda Nobunaga. They then faced another branch of Ogasawara clan which was led by Ogasawara Sadayoshi and his retainers which opposed the steps taken by Dōsetsusai. Sadayoshi's group appealed to the Tokugawa clan and offered their allegiance to Ieyasu. Kagekatsu assigned Yamaura Kagekuni, son of Murakami Yoshikiyo, to control the counties of Sarashina, Hanishina, Takai , and Minauchi. Meanwhile, Sanada Masayuki and his brother, Sanada Nobutada, also submitted to the Uesugi clan and was assigned to Makinoshima Castle.

Starting from 23 June onwards, Ieyasu's vassal Osuga Yasutaka worked together with former Takeda clan vassals such as Sone Masatada, Masasuke Ariizumi, and Okabe Masatsuna distributing letter of intents about fiefs appointment in Shinano.

On June 24, Kagekatsu advanced into northern Shinano and entered Naganuma castle. In the same day, Masayuki submitted to Uesugi Kagekatsu.

On June 28, Ieyasu further dispatched another detachments led by Okubo Tadayo, Ishikawa Yasumichi, and Honda Hirotaka and his son Yasushige to Kai as reinforcements in an attempt to win over the local samurai clans in Kai and Shinano which still remained neutral. Subsequently, Ieyasu also dispatched the Anayama clan to resist the Hōjō clan. He also sent his generals Ōkubo Tadayo, Ishikawa Yasumichi and Honda Hirotaka along with his son Yasushige as reinforcements for them to resist the Hōjō. By the end of June, the Hōjō clan had secured all of the territory except for the areas controlled by the Sanada in Numata and Agatsuma.

On July 7, as the Oda clan learned of the defeat of Takigawa Kazumasu by the Hōjō clan at the Battle of Kanagawa, Toyotomi Hideyoshi sent a letter to Ieyasu to give him authorization to lead military operations to secure the two provinces of Kai and Shinano from the Hōjō and Uesugi clans. (Note: Ieyasu's position and actions here are not those of an independent feudal lord, but as a feudal lord under the Oda regime, with the aim of defeating the Hojo clan) Ieyasu then deployed his forces to various fortresses in the Kōfu Basin to oppose Ujinao, who had camped his army in the area of present-day Hokuto City. Hattori Hanzō led Iga clan warriors to Katsuyama Castle (Kamisone-cho, Kofu City), Minakuchi Castle, and Kotohirayama Castle (Misakuchi-cho, Kofu City), where he monitored the Nakamichi road connecting Kai and Suruga.

=== Uesugi withdrawal ===
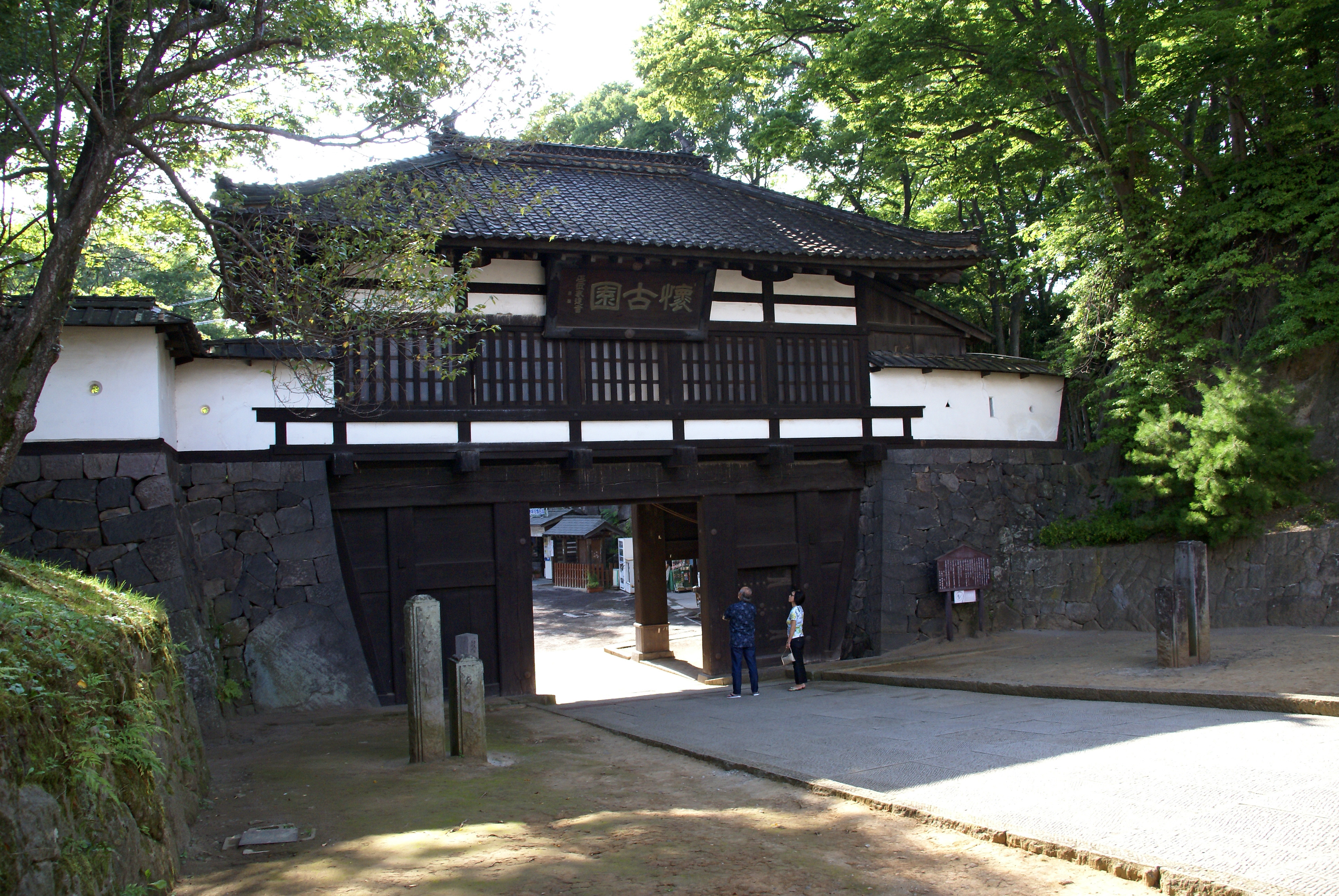
Komoro Castle, The place where Yoda Nobushige negotiate with Takigawa Kazumasu and Kiso Yoshimasa in June. Also used by Nobushige as a base to resist the Hōjō invasion.

On July 9, Masayuki changed his allegiance from the Uesugi to the Hōjō when he surrendered to Hōjō Ujinao, and began building a system of fortifications to station his vassals in Ueno Province. His brother, Nobutada, also submitted to the Hōjō on the same month. However, Nobutada expelled from his castle by Hōjō's representative, Yamada Ukon-no-jo, who refused the negotiation term with Nobutada.

Subsequently on July 12, as the troops under Hōjō Ujinao advanced across the Usui Pass, Nobushige resisted them, but then he abandoned the Komoro Castle and retreated to a fortress which he deemed more suitable to defend against the Hōjō army. Later on July 16, Sadayoshi launched an attack on Fukashi Castle, forcing Dōsetsusai along with Hidemasa to surrender. Ujinao advanced his troops while leaving the siege against the castle to his general, Daidōji Masashige. Meanwhile, the Hōjō negotiated a truce with the Uesugi in July 19, so they could focus their front towards the Tokugawa in Kai province, much to the dismay of Masayuki, as he had hoped to secure his territory in Numata instead of from the Uesugi.

The resistances of local warlords against Hōjō increased further this time, as an Ogasawara clan branch in Mishima Izu province under Ogasawara Hirokatsu also defied the Hōjō clan. The Hōjō clan defeat them in a battle where Hirokatsu's father was killed. Thus, Hirokatsu retreated to Mitsuba Castle in Suruga province. Meanwhile, the Enoshita clan, another local clan subject to the former Takeda clan, which was led by Enoshita Norikiyo, also showed their resistance against the Hōjō when they fought and beat a detachment of Hōjō troops at the Battle of Sakaguchi.

=== Stalemate ===
On August 6, the main body of the Tokugawa army led by Ieyasu met with the Hōjō clan's main army that was stationed at Wakamiko castle. Ieyasu deployed Matsudaira Kiyomune, Torii Mototada, Naitō Nobunari, and Mizuno Katsunari to guard the area. This place became known by historians as "Wakamiko face-off", where 8,000 Tokugawa soldiers atands against approximately 50,000 Hojo soldiers led by Hōjō Ujinao. As Ieyasu's forces lined up at Shinpu and Nomi Castles to the north and fortified their defenses, various skirmishes broke out, where the smaller Tokugawa forces managed to stall the much larger Hōjō forces. In the middle of these engagements, Sakakibara Yasumasa stormed a castle which occupied by the Hōjō, while Matsudaira Ietada was harassing the Hōjō food supplies.

The Tokugawa forces then engaged in the battle of Kurokoma village against the large Hōjō army who had recently received reinforcements from the Satomi clan, with 10,000 fresh soldiers led by Satomi Yoshiyori, the ruler of the Awa Province (Chiba). To break the stalemate on the frontline, Hōjō Ujinao ordered a 10,000 troop detachment led by Hōjō Ujitada, who was based at Tanimura Castle, to march around the periphery of Kurokoma Through the Misaka Pass, to encircle the Tokugawa army.

Ieyasu realized the Hōjō plan to encircle him, and dispatched Mizuno Katsunari and Torii Mototada to lead 2,000 soldiers to intercept them, where they managed to rout the Hōjō troops and prevent the encirclement. Katsunari along with Yasusada Miyake caused panic among the Ujinao soldiers with their assault. Hōjō Ujikatsu saw this and went to reinforce and rescue Ujitada. In response, Katsunari and Miyake took the initiative to intercept the incoming Ujikatsu's reinforcements. Despite quarrels with Mototada who viewed Katsunari as being reckless and not following orders, Katsunari was praised for his outstanding performance and received rewards. Due to this daring raid by Mototada and Katsunari, the Hōjō army ultimately failed to encircle to Tokugawa army.

Historian Koichiro Hamada reported that according to Mikawa Monogatari (三河物語), after this battle Mototada publicly displayed the 300 heads of Hōjō soldiers killed in this clash to demoralize the Hōjō army. In the end, the Tokugawa clan managed to force a stalemate, as the alliance of the Hōjō and the Satomi clans which far outnumbered the Tokugawa could not dislodge them from Kurokoma.

=== Hōjō clan setbacks ===
On August 12, after a series of Tokugawa clan victories over the Hōjō clan, former Takeda clan generals including Kiso Yoshimasa, Hoshina Masanao, Yoda Nobushige, and many others, gained the confidence to openly declare their allegiance to Ieyasu. As the Hoshina clan observed the situation, Masanao's father Masanao, along with other Masanao's brothers Masatoshi and Masaaki also defected to Tokugawa. In response, Ieyasu assigned his Hatamoto officer, Shibata Yasutada, to be a military inspector under Nobushige.

Up to this point, Ieyasu was generally still at a disadvantage in the war. In the Saku district, he only had Yoda Nobushige who was struggling by himself in guerilla warfare against the Hōjō, as the bulk of new Tokugawa supporters such as the Takekawa and Tsugane clans of Kai also suffered from a shortage of provisions while the number of anti-Hōjō forces continued to grow. In response, Yoda Nobushige took the initiative by contacting Masayuki to entice him to the Tokugawa side. By taking advantage of the Hōjō setbacks, Masayuki had placed Yazawa Tsunayori in Numata Castle and his son Sanada Nobuyuki in Iwabitsu Castle, as he started to collude with Ieyasu and Nobushige in secret.

In the middle of this conflict, Naomasa further managed to recruit more samurais that had formerly served various Takeda generals such as Ichijō Nobutatsu, Yamagata Masakage, Masatsune Tsuchiya, and Hara Masatane with the help of former Takeda clan retainer named Kimata Morikatsu who organized the contacts of those samurais with Naomasa. Furthermore, Naomasa also received another letter of submission from Obata Nobusada, the leader of the Takeda clan's red armored cavalry troops. (Note: different person than Obata Masamori Nobusada, who already died at that moment.) Aside from military service, Naomasa played diplomatic role during this conflict as he received around 41 letters from many former Takeda clan's vassals to submit to Ieyasu. Overall, the duration of Tokugawa force stand-off against the Hōjō and the Satomi clan up in the area around Wakamiko to this point already reached 80 days, and his ranks gradually swelled as more than 800 former vassals of the Takeda clan (900 according to Susumu Shimazaki) from Kōfu joined the Tokugawa clan to oppose the Hōjō.

In early September, a Tokugawa army detachment from the Iga Province commanded by Hattori Hanzō invaded the Saku District, where they were aided by local Shinano samurai warriors from the Tsugane clan led by Öbi Sukemitsu. Hattori Hanzō and Öbi Sukemitsu launched a night attack on Egusuku Castle (also known as Shishiku Castle), capturing it. Later, Hanzō also captured Sanogoya Castle in Izu Province under the cover of heavy rain, causing Ieyasu to elicit praise for this achievement. In the same month, in Yamanashi Prefecture, former Takeda clan vassals led by Kōno Morimasa managed to defeat the Hōjō clan at Misaka Pass. (Note: A mountain pass between Minamitsuru District and Misaka, Yamanashi)

In September 25, in an attempt to overcome this difficult situation and secure a supply line from the Suruga area, Hōjō Ujimasa personally led troops from Odawara Castle to attempt to capture Sanmaebashi Castle ( located in Numazu City, Shizuoka Prefecture in 21st century), but his troops was repulsed by fierce resistance from Tokugawa generals such as Matsudaira Yasuchika, Ogasawara Nobumoto, and Honda Shigetsugu in a clash Near by Mishima, Shizuoka. However, Nobumoto was slain in this battle. Nevertheless, the Hōjō troops forced to retreat into Yamanaka Castle.

=== Sanada clan betrayal ===
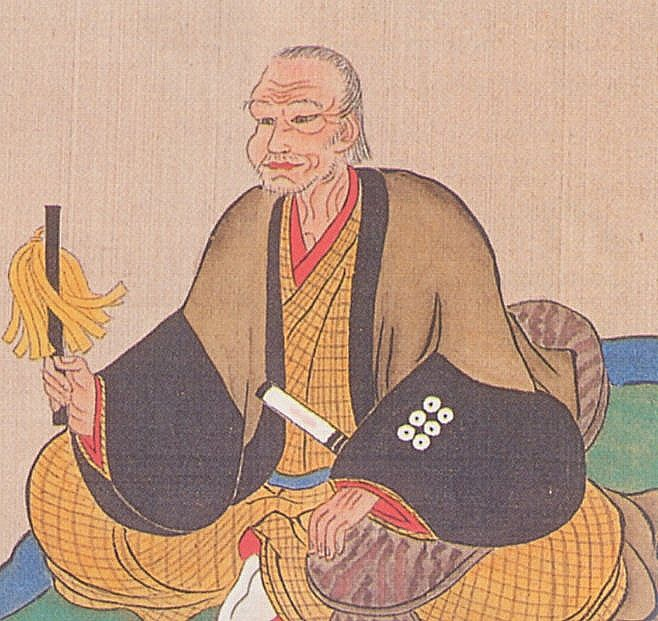
Sanada Masayuki changed his allegiance twice during the war

By September, Sanada Nobutada also briefed Masayuki to switch allegiance to the Tokugawa clan.

On October 19, Sanada Masayuki openly declared his allegiance to the Tokugawa clan by attacking Nezu Masatsuna, a lieutenant of Hōjō Ujinao, and cooperated with Yoda Nobushige to resist the Hōjō clan forces around Komoro, as Ieyasu instructed. It was believed by historians that information about Masayuki's defection had reached the Hōjō clan in early October, as there are documents and letters from Sone Masatada and Yoda Nobushige praising Sanada Masateru for his success to convince Masayuki to join the Tokugawa side.

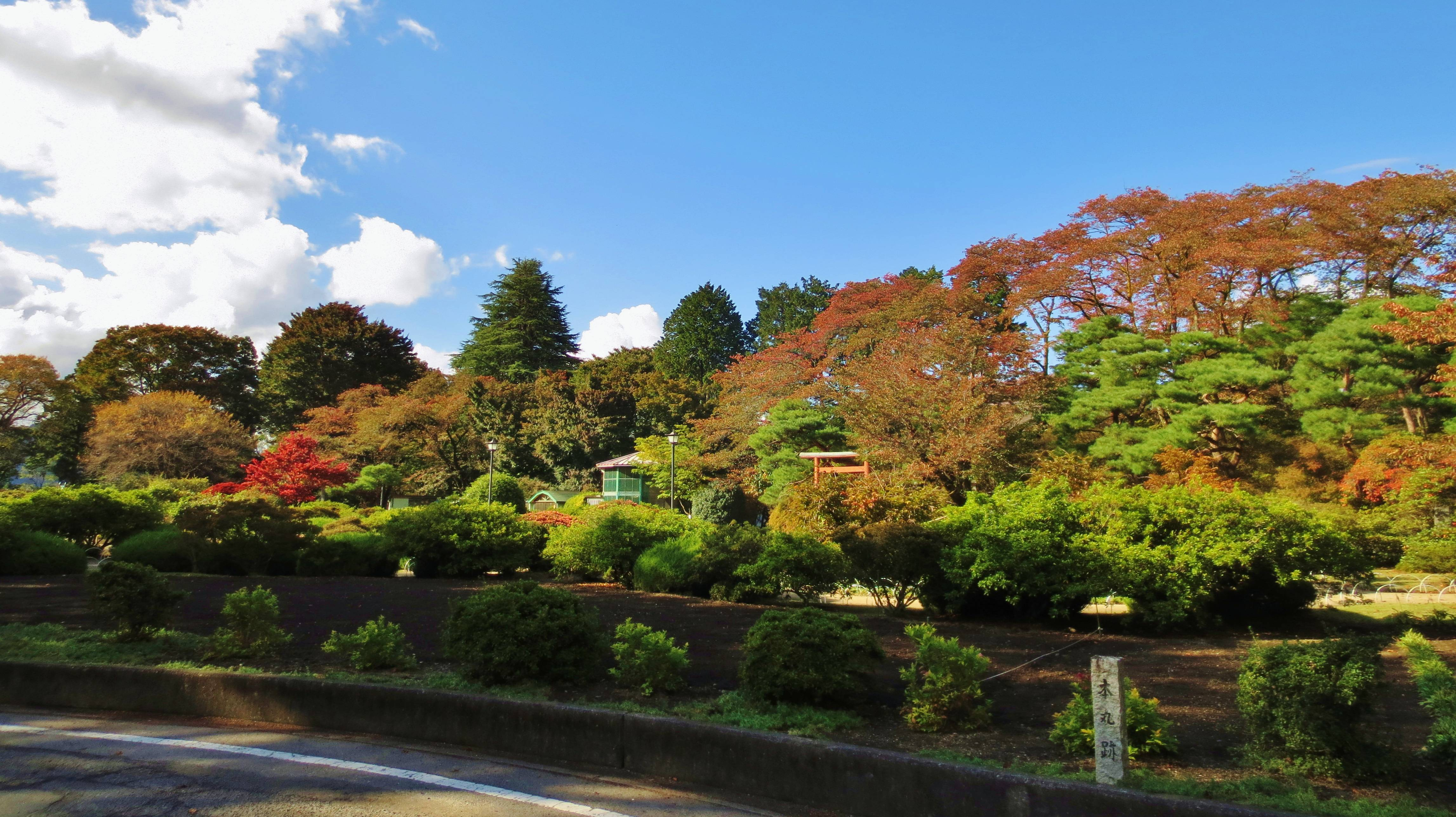
Numata Castle ruins, now become a park in modern day.

With the encouragement of Yoda Nobushige and Masayuki's brother Sanada Nobutada, Sanada Nobuyuki led his forces outside their fortress and recapture Numata Castle from the Hojo forces. In response to Masayuki's betrayal, a commander of Hōjō forces named Fujita Ujikuni tried to recapture Numata castle again. However, he failed to do so as Masayuki repelled his attempt.

On October 21, the Tokugawa troops in the Saku district managed to capture Mochizuki Castle. In response, the Hōjō side recalled Hōjō Tsunanari and others from Kai Province, and ordered Nyudo Urano, Lord of Ooto Castle in Agatsuma County, to immediately attack Iwabitsu Castle. Masayuki and Yoda Nobutaka then cut off communication between Komoro Castle and Tomono Castle.

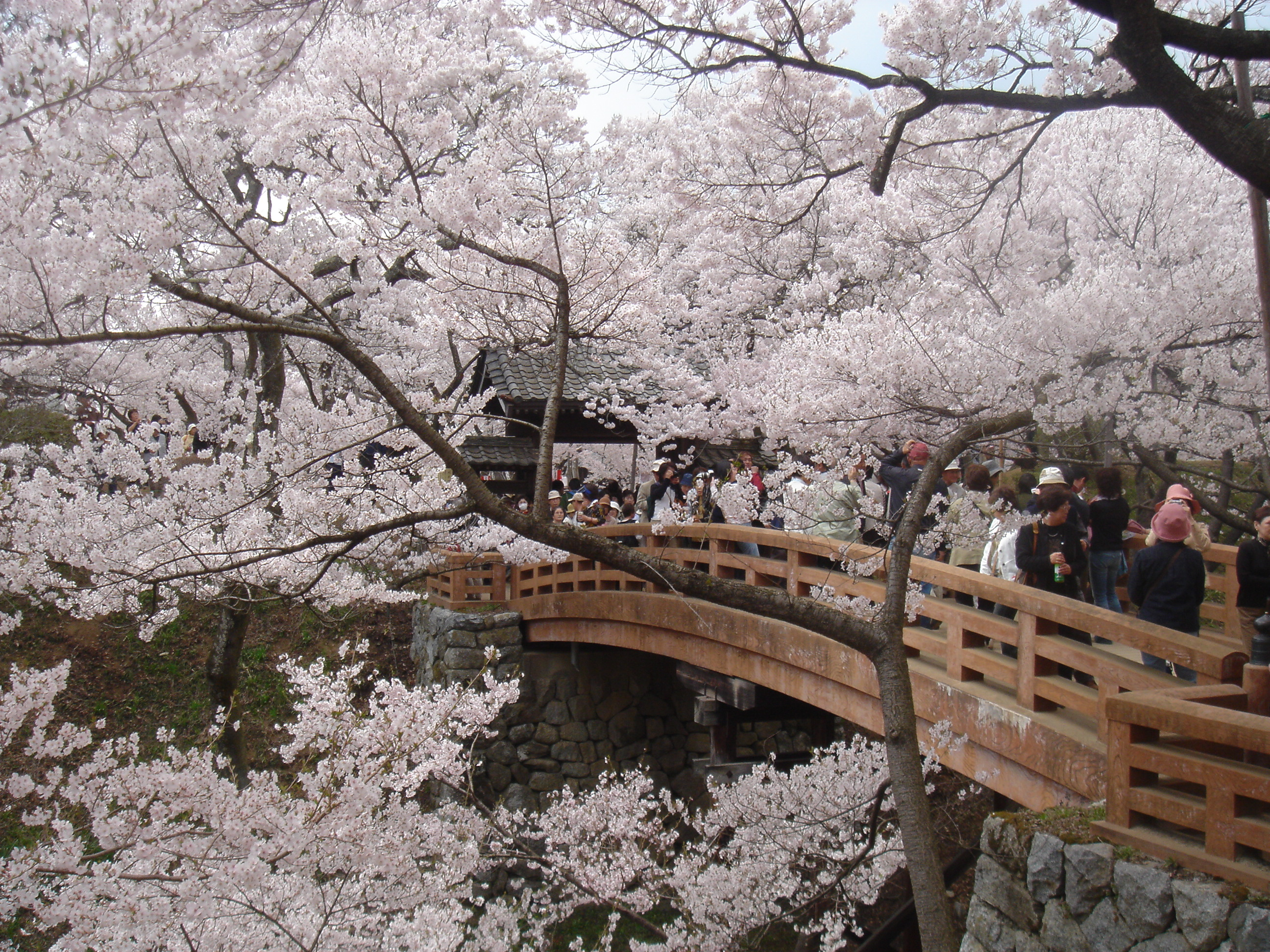
Takatō Castle. Its controller, the Naito clan, defected to Tokugawa clan during this conflict.

Later on October 24, Ieyasu issued a Shuinjō (Red Seal Permit) to Masanao which granted him control of half of Ina district. This forced the Naito clan that had remained in Takatō Castle to switch their allegiance to the Tokugawa side. In November, Masanao attacked Minowa Castle, and caused the lord of the castle, Fujisawa Yorichika, who was on the side of Hōjō, to commit suicide. Masanao also expelled his grandson and annexed the Minowa territory. As a result, Masanao took control of the Kamiina district around Takato Castle. On October 26, the Tokugawa clan managed to capture Ashida Castle, while Masayuki provided military supplies to secure the castle. Nobushige also captured Uchiyama Castle, successfully cutting off the Hōjō army's supply route. Eventually, together with Masayuki, they occupied Usui Pass, and then captured Iwamurata Castle. The battle in the Saku district was then in Tokugawa's favor, and Masayuki retreated to his main territory.

Between November 1582 to January 1583, in conjunction with the main battles at Wakamiko and Kurokoma which were still ongoing, Komai Masanao worked together with Torii Mototada and Ii Naomasa, along with Suwa Yoritada, who had joined the Tokugawa rank, to attack the Chikuma District which was controlled by Ogasawara Sadayoshi. On February 10, Sadayoshi submitted to the Tokugawa clan.

=== End of the conflict ===
The problems for the Hōjō clan increased by the day as Ieyasu established contact with daimyo lords from north-east Japan including the Satake, Yuki, and Utsunomiya clans, who threatened to invade the Hōjō from behind while the Hōjō were still engaging Ieyasu in battle. Ieyasu, for his part, establish cooperation with those distant Hōjō enemies—the northern Kantō daimyo lords who later involved in the battle of Numajiri fighting the Hōjō.

As the war turned in favor of Ieyasu, combined with the defection of Sanada Masayuki to the Tokugawa side, the Hōjō negotiated a truce with Ieyasu.

== Aftermath ==
"One copy: At the Wakamiko Plain in Kai Province, Hōjō Ujimasa and our Shinso (lit. 'Divine Lord', referring Tokugawa Ieyasu) mutually reconciled and reached an accord; the five articles penned by Lord Naomasa, upon which Ujimasa nodded in approval and signed..."

Recorded draft of the reply from Ii Naomasa for Hōjō Ujimasa, 28 October 1582, Kimata clan document.

The Hōjō clan sent Hōjō Ujinobu as representative, while the Tokugawa sent Ii Naomasa as representative for the preliminary meetings. Representatives from the Oda clan, Oda Nobukatsu, Oda Nobutaka, and Toyotomi Hideyoshi who mediated the negotiation from October 1582, also assisted the ratification of the truce. Sanada Nobutada, a younger brother of Sanada Masayuki, was given 5,000 koku of territory by Ieyasu, and Okabe Masatsuna was rewarded with a 7,600 koku domain in between Kai and Shinano provinces. In the aftermath of the war, Ieyasu once again sent Tadatsugu to subdue Suwa Yoritada at Suwa in Shinano in December, where Tadatsugu defeated Yoritada and secured his surrender to the Tokugawa clan.

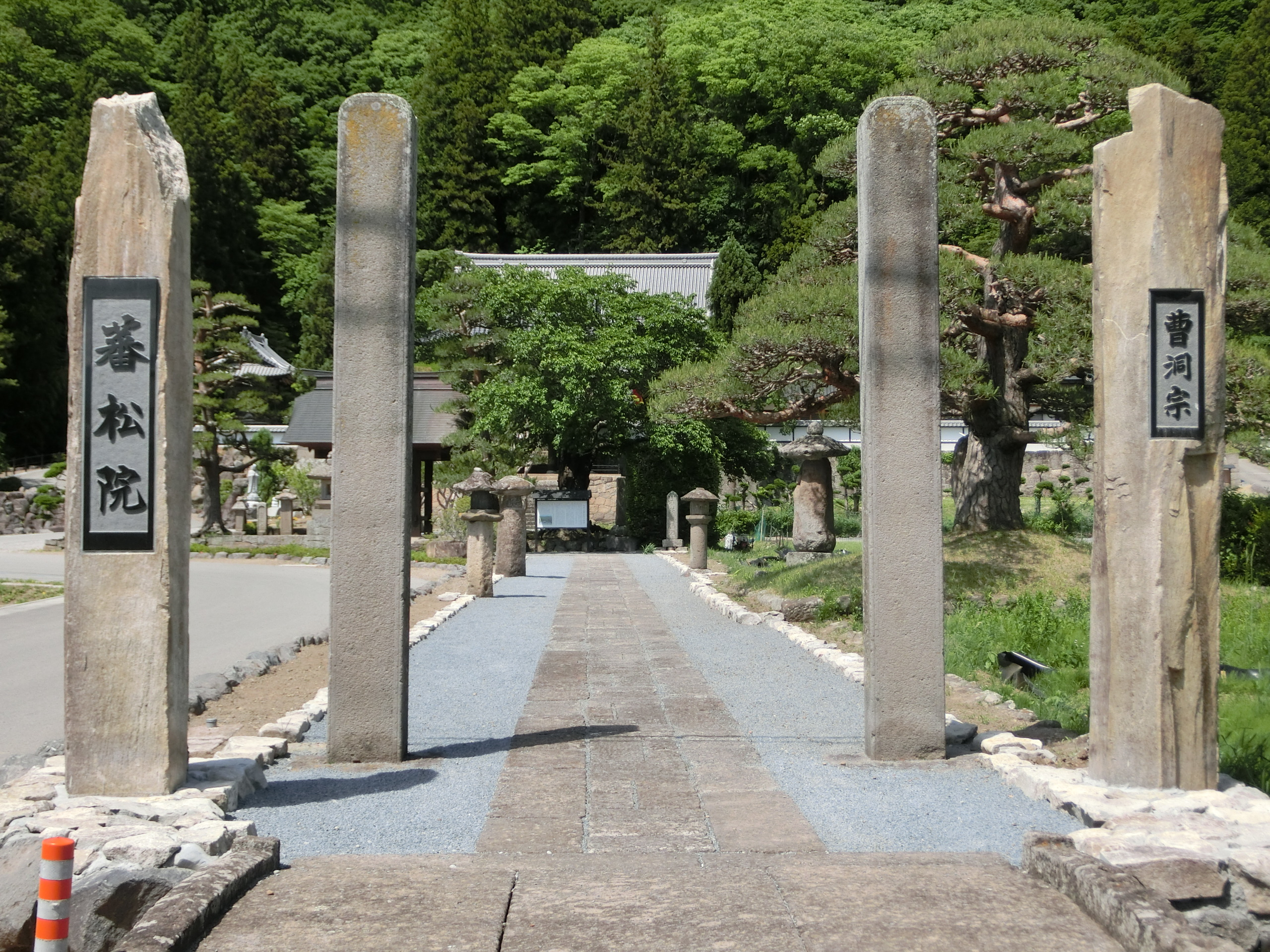
Grave of Yoda Nobushige, former Takeda clan general and benefactor of Ieyasu during the Tenshō-Jingo War.

In 1583, Ieyasu had a detachment of Ii Naomasa's troops subdue the Takatō area in Shinano, which had still not submitted to the Tokugawa clan. Meanwhile, Nobushige led the attack against the Tomono clan, and defeated them. The Tomono later also submitted and joined Tokugawa. In January, Nobushige further secured the submission of more Shinano local lord, the Mochizuki clan.

However, Yoda Nobushige was killed in action in the middle of operation. Yoda Yasukuni, who succeeded him as head of the Yoda clan, was given the surname Matsudaira and Komoro Castle. The territory he was allowed to inherit was 60,000 koku, one of the largest for any of Ieyasu's vassals at the time. Yashiro Hidemasa, who surrendered to Ogasawara Sadayoshi, also joined the Tokugawa clan later on April 1, 1584, together with his younger brother Ogasawara Mitsutoshi.

With the end of the Tensho Jingo War, Ieyasu now ruled over five provinces, including Kai and southern Shinano, in addition to his original territories of Mikawa, Totomi, and Suruga.

Ieyasu did not take a side during the Toyotomi Hideyoshi and Shibata Katsuie conflict, where Hideyoshi defeated Katsuie at the Battle of Shizugatake.

== Legacy ==
In March 1583, according to the Meishō genkō-roku record, Ieyasu organized a kishōmon (blood oath ritual) which historically known as Tenshō-Jingo kishōmon, with many samurai clans, local lords, low rank officials, ninja mercenaries, and even noble ladies that were formerly vassals of the Takeda clan in order to put them under the command of Tokugawa clan retainers.

During the process of the oath-taking Tokugawa, Ieyasu planned to give control of most of the former Takeda samurai to Ii Naomasa to command, having consulted and reached agreement with Sakai Tadatsugu, a senior Tokugawa clan vassal. However, Ieyasu's decision garnered protest from Sakakibara Yasumasa, who went so far as to threaten Naomasa. Tadatsugu immediately defended Ieyasu's decision in response and warned Yasumasa that if he did any harm to Naomasa, Tadatsugu would personally slaughter the Sakakibara clan; Yasumasa backed down and did not protest further. As there were no more protests, Ieyasu decided to assign the new recruits to various commands, as following:

- 70 former Takeda samurai from Tsuchiya clan, and also the clan of Ishiguro Shōgen to Ii Naomasa. (another source mentioned that total of 120 Takeda samurai warriors came under the command of Naomasa.)
- 11 former Takeda samurai from Komai clan led by Komai Masanao to Sakakibara Yasumasa.
- 60 former Takeda samurai of Asari clan led by Asari Masatane to Honda Tadakatsu.
- The largest number of Takeda clans vassals were under the direct control of Ieyasu himself. This group includes Sanada Nobutada; who became Tokugawa clan hatamoto and was given 5,000 koku fief under the Tokugawa clan, clans which were led by Yoda Nobushige or Hoshina Masanao (along with the local daimyo lords from Shinano who followed Masanao), the Kurihara clan of Kurihara Nobumori, 49 samurai from the Jō clan led by father and son Jō Kageshige and Jō Masashige, samurai who formerly guarded the frontiers of Takeda clan led Watanabe Hitoyanosuke, and many others. Among those who were assigned as Hatamoto, or direct vassal of Ieyasu, they were allowed to retain their positions, and even increased the revenue from the domains they controlled, particularly from the new territories which the Tokugawa clan conquered. This was apparent from the Saegusa clan, where the son of the clan leader, Saegusa Masayoshi, retained his territory, while his father Saegusa Torayoshi was appointed as one of four magistrates in the Tokugawa clan.

Aside from the already established workforces from the former Takeda clan, Ieyasu also established new offices such as the Hachiōji sen'nin-dōshin, which formed from a patchwork membership of nine small clans of Takeda retainers. This group continued to serve the Tokugawa clan faithfully until they were disbanded during the Meiji Restoration in 1868. (Note: At first, their members were 250 men. Later expanded to 500 after Ieyasu transferred into the Kantō region. Later, they were appointed as guardians of Hachiōji Castle, and their memberships expanded from 500 to 1,000. This is why they were called "Hachiōji sen'nin-dōshin" (Hachiōji's 1,000 officers).)

Furthermore, Anayama Nobutada's adopted daughter, Otsuma no Kata (Shimoyamadono), also became Ieyasu's concubine, and later she will bore Takeda Nobuyoshi.

Territorial jurisdiction speaking, the kishomon established Tokugawa governance of former Takeda clan domains such as Kozuke Toyooka Domain, Mito Domain, Kishiwada Domain, Takatō Domain, Kōfu Domain, Iida Domain and Kokura Domain among others.

=== Tokugawa clan consolidation ===
Historian Masaru Hirayama argued that the Tenshō-Jingo War, with the resulting absorption of Takeda clan followers, was not only a factional conflict in the eastern provinces, but a war that determined the future unification of Japan, as it pushed Tokugawa Ieyasu into a key position of the Toyotomi government.

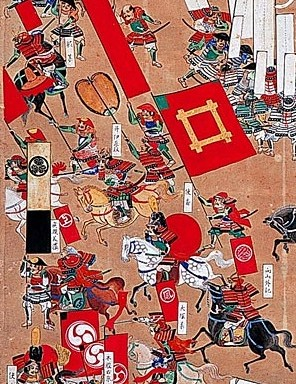
Edo period depiction of the "Red Guards" (Akazonae) of the Ii clan

Historian Michifumi Isoda opined that one factor why the Tokugawa clan could conquer Japan was the incorporation of former Takeda clan vassals into the service of Ieyasu's military regime, particularly under the command of his general Ii Naomasa. The elite samurai unit under Naomasa which nicknamed "Red Demons" (赤鬼, Akaoni), or Red Guards (赤備え, akazonae), was formed from the remnants of Yamagata Masakage's red armored cavalry, and Obata Nobusada's own Red cavalry. This red armored unit would play important roles in the future battles of Tokugawa Ieyasu such as the battle of Komaki and Nagakute, battle of Sekigahara, and siege of Osaka.

Historian Watanabe Daimon also stated that the Kai province samurai greatly influenced Ieyasu's domination of Japan. According to an anecdote from "Meisho Genkoroku" (Collection of words and deeds of great commanders in Japanese history), when Nobunaga sent Takeda Katsuyori's head to Ieyasu, Ieyasu proclaimed in the front of the former Takeda clan followers that although Katsuyori was a biological son of Shingen, Ieyasu himself was the "spiritual successor" of Shingen.

The statecraft doctrine which Ieyasu practiced and learned from Shingen's former vassals greatly benefited him in the long run, such as when Ieyasu moved his power base to the Kantō region in 1590.

== Historiography ==
The record of Hōjō Godaiki referred to this conflict as the standoff at Wakamiko (若御子対陣, Wakamiko Taijin). However, modern Japanese historians in 1980s started to refer the conflict as "Tenshō-Jingo" to cover the broader scope of the entire conflicts, not just the 80-day engagement at Wakamiko.

There is a theory that from the perspective of the conflict zone's local powers, the Tenshō-Jingo war still continued even after the Tokugawa-Hōjō truce. There is evidence that even after the Tokugawa Ieyasu's transfer to the Kantō region following the fall of the Hōjō clan in 1590 and the assignment of the provinces, some local lords still resist the authority of either Toyotomi and Tokugawa, which continued until the transfer of Uesugi Kagekatsu to Aizu, where the local daimyo were separated from their former territory and the establishment of control by the Azuchi–Momoyama period.

Nevertheless, In 2014, Japanese historian Hiroshi Ishikawa pointed out that the Kai Kokushi (Kai province historical record document) no longer used honorifics when referring to the traditional local lords of Kai Province, such as the Takeda and Yanagisawa clans after the Tenshō-Jingo Kishomon pact which occurred after the war ended. However, it does address Tokugawa Ieyasu as "divine master"(神祖). this historiography of the cessation of war in 1583 was supported by historian Masaru Hirayama, who cited the Tashiro manuscript as a source, redefined it in his book "Nomi Castle Ruins" as a general term for the military conflicts that occurred in the Kai, Shinano, Kozuke, and Suruga provinces, where those provinces were generally safe from collateral damages of the war between ruling daimyos, except for 1582, the moment when mass unrests within those provinces occurred. Hirayama also noted that the recorded anomaly of intensive chaos in those provinces also ceased after October 1582.

== See also ==
- Battle of Mikatagahara
- Battle of Nagashino
- Kōyō Gunkan
- Twenty-Four Generals of Takeda Shingen
- Tenshō Iga War

== Bibliography ==
- Hirayama, Masaru (2011), 武田遺領をめぐる動乱と秀吉の野望 [Takeda's Territory and Hideyoshi's Ambitions], 戎光祥出版, ISBN 978-4-86403-035-9
- Hirayama, Masaru (2015). 天正壬午の乱 [Tensho-Jingo war] (増補改訂版 ed.). 戎光祥出版. ISBN 978-4-86403-170-7.
- Hirayama, Masaru (2016-09-15). 真田信之 父の知略に勝った決断力 [Sanada Nobuyuki: Decisiveness that outdid his father's wisdom] (in Japanese). 株式会社ＰＨＰ研究所.
- Kanie, Seiji (1990). 日本全史:ジャパン. クロニック Japan Chronik (in Japanese). Kodansha/講談社. ISBN 9784062039949.
- Katagiri, Akihiko (2017), 松代, 村上（山浦）景国の家中・知行と海津城, vol. 31, 長野市 教育委員会 文化財課
- Kazuhiro Marushima (丸島和洋) (2015). "北条・徳川間外交の意思伝達構造" [The structure of communication in diplomacy between the Hojo and Tokugawa]. 国文学研究資料館紀要. 11 (11). 国文学研究資料館. doi:10.24619/00001469. ISSN 1880-2249.
- Kazuhiro Marushima (丸島和洋); Shunroku Shibatsuji (柴辻俊六); Masaru Hirayama (平山優); Motoki Kuroda (黒田基樹) (2015). "Yashiro Hidemasa". 北条・徳川間外交の意思伝達構造 [Biographical Dictionary of the Takeda Clan's Retainers]. Tokyodo Publishing.
- Miya, Eiji; Yamada, Hideo, eds. (1986), 新潟県の地名 [Place Names of Niigata Prefecture], 日本歴史地名大系, 平凡社, ISBN 978-4-582-91007-0
- Nishimoto, Keisuke (2010). Keisuke家康 (ポビラポケット文庫伝記). Papura Publications. ISBN 978-4591117385.
- Noda, Hiroko (2007). "徳川家康天下掌握過程における井伊直政の役割" [The role of Ii Naomasa in the process of Tokugawa Ieyasu taking control of the country]. 彦根城博物館研究紀要. 18. Hikone Castle Museum.
- Saito, Shinichi (2005). 戦国時代の終焉. 中公新書 1809. 中央公論新社. ISBN 4121018095.
- Seiji Kobayashi (1994). 秀吉権力の形成 書札礼・禁制・城郭政策 [Formation of Hideyoshi's power: Calligraphy, prohibition, and castle policy] (in Japanese). 東京大学出版会. ISBN 9784130260596.
- Shibatsuji Shunroku (1996), 真田昌幸 [Sanada Masayuki], 人物叢書, 吉川弘文館, ISBN 464205202X
- Toshikazu Komiyama (2002). 井伊直政家臣団の形成と徳川家中での位置 [Formation of Ii Naomasa's vassals and their position within the Tokugawa clan]. 学習院史学 (Thesis). Gakushuin University Historical Society. pp. 50～66. hdl:10959/988.
- Turnbull, Stephen R. (1998). The Samurai Sourcebook. Arms & Armour Press. ISBN 1-85409-523-4.
- Turnbull, Stephen R. (1977). The samurai: a military history (1st American ed.). New York: Macmillan. ISBN 978-0-02-620540-5. in Davis 1999.
  - —— (2011). Samurai: The World of the Warrior. Bloomsbury Publishing. ISBN 978-1-84908-996-8.
  - ——; Rava, Giuseppe (2012). Tokugawa Ieyasu: leadership, strategy, conflict. Command. Oxford, UK: Osprey Publishing. ISBN 978-1-84908-574-8.
- Yamamoto, Dai; Owada, Tetsuo, eds. (1985), 戦国大名系譜人名事典 [Dictionary of Genealogies and Names of Sengoku Daimyo], vol. 東国編, 新人物往来社, ISBN 978-4-404-01293-7
