= Siege of Takatō (1582) =

Takeover of the Takeda clan by Oda Nobunaga's forces

- Part of the Sengoku period
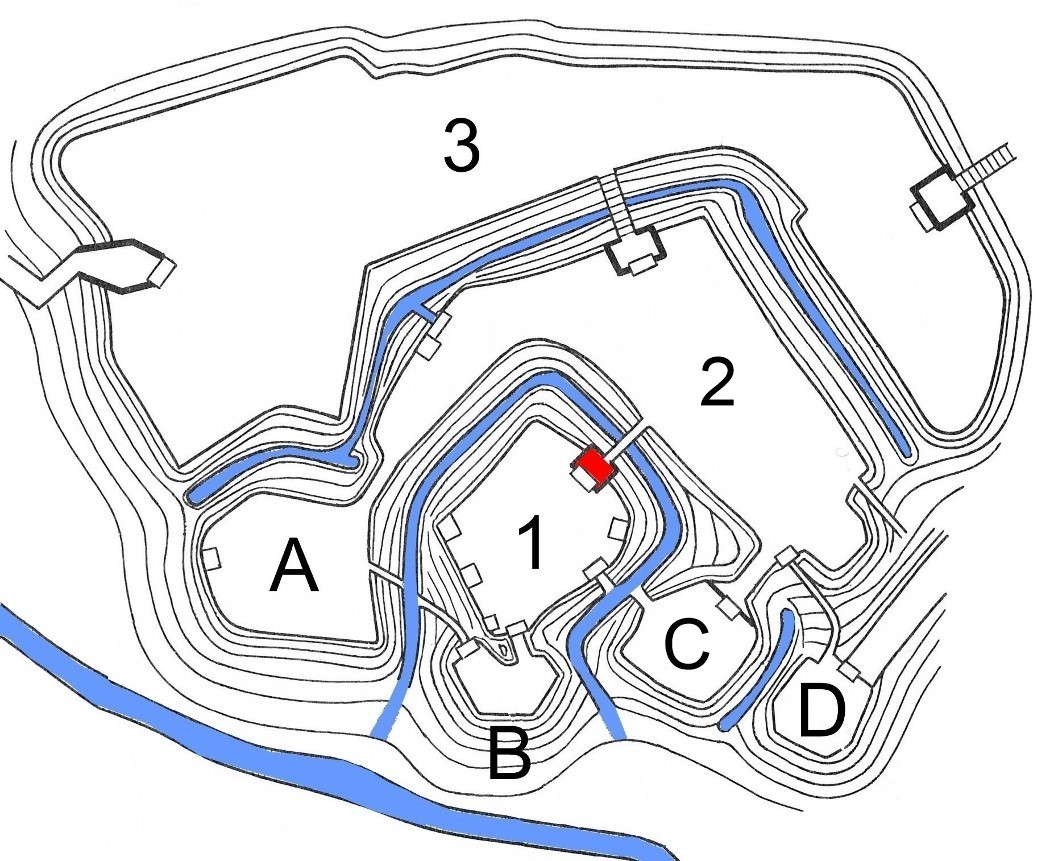
- Map of Takato castle
Date	March 1–2, 1582 (Lunar calendar)
Location	Takatō castle, Shinano Province 35°50′00″N 138°03′45″E
Result	Oda victory

Belligerents
Forces of Oda Nobunaga	Forces of Takeda clan

Commanders and leaders
Oda Nobutada; Oda Nagamasu; Takigawa Kazumasu; Kawajiri Hidetaka; Mori Nagayoshi; Hori Hidemasa	Takeda Morinobu †; Hoshina Masanao; Oyamada Masayuki

Strength
30,000	400

Casualties and losses
Significant	Entire garrison, many civilians
- Location within Nagano Prefecture Siege of Takatō (1582) (Japan)

In the history of Japan, the 1582 siege of Takatō (高遠城の戦い) was one of the final battles of the Takeda clan against the forces of Oda Nobunaga. The only Takeda stronghold in Shinano province to put up any resistance to Nobunaga's final invasion of Takeda domain (in February 1582), the castle was taken by storm on March the 2nd 1582.

== Prelude ==
The war of the Takeda clan against Oda Nobunaga began in 1572 with the battle of Mikatagahara, where Takeda Shingen, overlord of Kai, Shinano and Suruga provinces, defeated the combined forces of Oda Nobunaga and Tokugawa Ieyasu in Totomi province. Shingen's heir Takeda Katsuyori was decisively defeated in the battle of Nagashino (1575), losing more than 10,000 men and the core of his generals. However, thanks to Oda Nobunaga's engagement on other fronts (mostly his war against Ikko-Ikki 1570–1580), Takeda Katsuyori managed to preserve his family domain and by 1582 the Takeda clan was still considered a regional power in Eastern Japan, holding provinces of Kai, Shinano and Suruga. However, by that time their strength was very much spent by more than 10 years of war with Oda Nobunaga and Tokugawa Ieyasu, their eastern neighbors: their warriors thinly stretched in tiny garrisons over vast borders, their serfs exhausted by conscription and over-taxation, and their retainers and allies disillusioned and uncertain. So, when the time of Nobunaga's final offensive finally came, he had 15 of the richest provinces in Japan against the three poor and devastated provinces of Takeda.

=== Oda-Tokugawa's offensive in Shinano province ===
On February 1, 1582 (Lunar calendar) Kiso Joshimasa, one of the Takeda vassals in Shinano, defected to Oda Nobunaga. On February 2, Takeda Katsuyori and his generals left their capital near Kofu in Kai and entered Shinano with some 15,000 men. In response, on February 3, Oda Nobunaga decided to invade the Takeda domain from all sides: Tokugawa Ieyasu was to invade Suruga province, Hojo Ujimasa was to attack from Kanto, and Oda Nobutada from Mino. Takeda forts on the Mino border had fallen by treachery on February 6, and on February 12 Oda Nobutada entered Shinano province, leading troops from Mino and Owari, advancing to the north-east. Along the way, Takeda castles of Matsuo and Iida surrendered without a fight (February 14) with some commanders defecting to Nobutada, the first of them Ogasawara Nobumine of Matsuo. The only fight was put up at Yagohara castle (February 16), where Takeda lost some 40 samurai. Oshima Castle further north-east fell without a fight, while villagers and lesser gentry (ji-samurai) of Shinano province flocked to Nobutada's army and greeted them as liberators. In the meantime, on February 25, the main Takeda fortress in Suruga surrendered to Tokugawa Ieyasu through treachery of its commander, Anayama Baisetsu, Takeda Shingen's nephew, who was considered one of the principal pillars of the house of Takeda. As Oda forces reached the middle of Shinano province with no opposition to speak of, and the main Takeda supporters in Shinano and Suruga defected to Oda, on February 28 Takeda Katsuyori retreated from Shinano to his home province of Kai, seeking to defend his castle of Shinpu, the new capital of the Takeda clan. Katsuyori moved his seat to Shinpu Castle in December 1581, as the old Takeda capital in Kofu was practically undefendable, not a castle but a simple one-story daimyo residence defended by a single moat (built by Takeda Nobutora in 1519), as Takeda chieftains of former generations relied on their army for protection.

== Battle ==
On the March 1st, Oda Nobutada's army reached the Takeda castle of Takato in eastern Shinano, which was a sturdy mountain fort protected by steep cliffs on three sides (except the rear) and the Fujisawa River that covered the eastern and northern approach: the road leading to the main gate was barely passable even to a single rider.

Takeda Morinobu (also known as Nishina Morinobu), the fifth son of the famed Takeda Shingen, fortified himself and his forces within the Takatō castle. Oda Nobutada ordered that a priest be sent to Morinobu to mediate, but Morinobu responded by cutting off the unfortunate man's nose and ears, and sending him back to Nobutada.

Although the defenders relied heavily on the natural defenses of the castle, Oda forces had former Takeda turncoats on their side. The traitor Ogasawara Nobumine of Matsuo led the attackers to a ford in the Fujisawa river downstream, and showed them a way to the least protected rear side of the castle. At dawn of March 2, 1582, while some of the Oda forces attacked the main gate to divert the defenders, the rest of the Oda army attacked the castle's postern. After a battle of several hours in front of the main gate, the remaining defenders fled inside the castle. In the meantime, Oda Nobutada with his bodyguards tore down the palisade at the postern and breached inside the castle. A fierce battle ensued in the bailey and the castle's buildings, and the defenders fought to the last, including women and children (the wife of Suwa Shoemon was noted in The Chronicle of Lord Nobunaga for her unprecedented fighting with a sword, while a boy shot numerous attackers with his bow from a narrow passage of the castle kitchen). In the final stand, the ranking samurai of Takeda killed their wives and children, and charged to the enemy, fighting to the death. According to The Chronicle of Lord Nobunaga, more than 400 enemy heads were taken (including Takeda Morinobu, whose head was sent to Oda Nobunaga in Gifu), while the attackers suffered heavy losses in dead and wounded.

== Aftermath ==
After the fall of Takato Castle on March 2, remaining Takeda garrisons in Shinano Province surrendered without a fight, and Oda Nobutada's army reached eastern border of Takeda home province of Kai. At the same time, Tokugawa Ieyasu burst into Kai from Suruga Province on the south, taking Takeda traitor Anayama Genba along as a guide. In the meantime, Takeda Katsuyori and his army of 10–15,000 in Shimpu Castle had calculated that Takato Castle would hold for some time, so the swift fall of that mighty fortress in only a day caused massive panic among Takeda supporters. Both generals and common soldiers were distracted by the urge to evacuate their families and children as the enemy armies of 40–50,000 invaded Kai from the south and the east, so no plans for defense were made, but entire Takeda army dispersed in panic: no more than 500-600 samurai remained with Takeda Katsuyori in Sinpu. So at dawn of the March 3rd (at the Hour of The Rabbit, around 6 a.m) Katsuyori set fire to Sinpu Castle and fled west with his family, leaving a great many hostages from noble families of his domain to perish in the flames. Their party was overtaken and destroyed by Oda forces eight days later, in the battle of Tenmokuzan (March 11, 1582) and Takeda clan had fallen. In the meantime, Oda Nobutada occupied the old Kai capital of Kofu on March 7, 1582. and had all of Takeda Katsuyori's family, relations and house elders hunted down and executed. All the remaining samurai of the three provinces of Suruga, Kai and Shinano flocked to Kofu and proclaimed their allegiance to Nobutada, presenting hostages, and the neighboring province of Kozuke surrendered without a fight.
