= Oda Nobutada =

16th-century Japanese samurai, son of Oda Nobunaga

- 織田 信忠
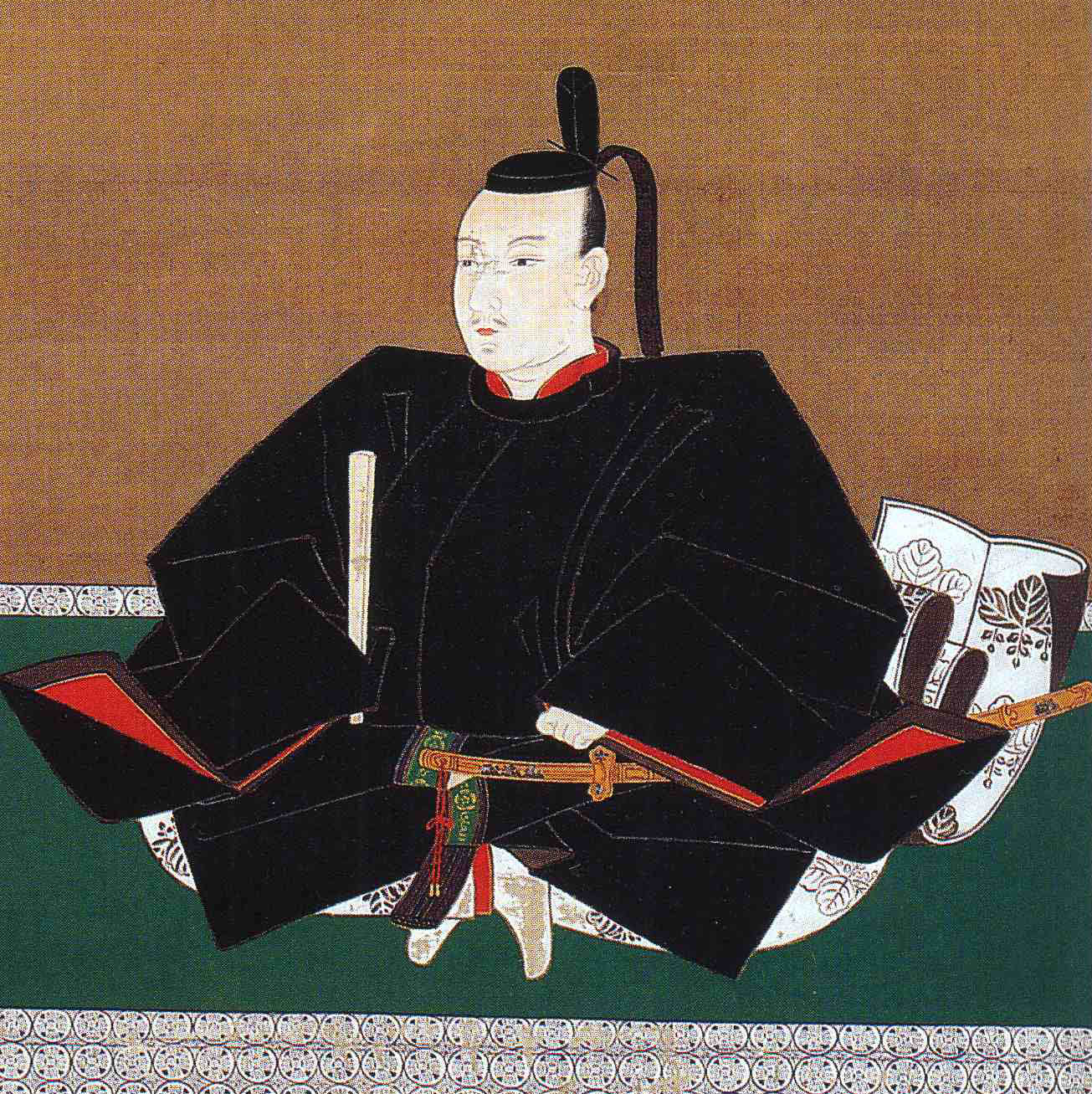

Head of Oda clan
- In office 1575–1582
- Preceded by: Oda Nobunaga
- Succeeded by: Oda Hidenobu

Personal details
- Born: 1557
- Died: June 21, 1582 (aged 24–25) Honnōji
- Relations: Oda Nobunaga (father); Kitsuno (mother); Nohime (adoptive mother); Oda Nobukatsu (brother); Oda Nobutaka (brother); Matsuhime (wife); Oda Hidenobu (son)

Military service
- Allegiance: Oda clan
- Years of service: 1575 - 1582
- Unit: Oda clan
- Battles/wars: Siege of Odani Castle; Sieges of Nagashima; Siege of Iwamura; Siege of Shigisan; Siege of Itami; Siege of Takato; Battle of Tenmokuzan; Honnō-ji Incident

Oda Nobutada (織田 信忠; 1557 – June 21, 1582) was a samurai and the eldest son of Oda Nobunaga, who fought in many battles during the Sengoku period of Japan. He commanded armies under his father in battles against Matsunaga Hisahide and against the Takeda clan.

== Biography ==
Oda Nobutada was born in Owari Province (尾張国) around 1557 as the eldest son of Oda Nobunaga (織田信長) (the second son if Oda Nobumasa actually exists). His nanny was Jotoku-In, daughter of Takigawa Kazumasu (滝川一益), who was one of the senior vassals of Oda Nobunaga. There is also a theory that Nobutada was adopted by Nohime. His childhood name was Kimyo-Maru (Kimyo means strange in Japanese). He first called himself Oda Kankuro Nobushige (織田勘九郎信重), and later changed to Nobutada (織田信忠).

During the Eiroku era, the Oda clan came into contact with the Takeda's territory in Kai Province (甲斐国) through Mino Province (美濃国), and the daughter of Toyama Naokado (遠山直廉), a warlord (国人) in southeast Mino province, became the adopted daughter of Nobunaga and married Takeda Katsuyori (武田勝頼), the eldest son of Takeda Shingen, thereby forming an alliance. According to the Koyo Gunkan, Katsuyori's wife died in November 1567, and engagement was arranged between Nobutada and Takeda Shingen's sixth daughter, Matsuhime, to solidify the alliance with the Takeda.

Takeda and Oda continued to maintain a friendly relationship, but during the Eiroku era, the Takeda began invading the territory of Tokugawa Ieyasu (徳川家康), an ally of Oda, in the direction of Mikawa (三河国) and Totomi (遠江国). In the 3rd year of Genki (1572), in response to a call from Yoshiaki Ashikaga, a shogun who had been hostile to Nobunaga, Shingen began invading Oda territory (Operation Seizyo (西上作戦)). The engagement was virtually broken due to Shingen's death and the marriage of Oda Nobutada was canceled. These events contributed to the destruction of the Ashikaga shogunate in 1573. After that, the Takeda clan tried to improve the relationship with the Oda clan at the end of Katsuyori's reign, but Nobunaga refused to reconcile.

Nobutada continued to follow Oda Nobunaga, and fought in various places, such as the Ishiyama Hongan-ji War (石山戦争), the Siege of Iwamura Castle (岩村城の戦い) in February 1574, and the attack on Ise Nagashima from July to September 1574. In 1577, Nobutada defeated Matsunaga Hisahide in the Siege of Shigisan. In 1582, he defeated Nishina Morinobu in the Siege of Takato and participated in the Battle of Tenmokuzan against Takeda Katsuyori.

== As Nobunaga's successor ==
In May 1575, at the Battle of Nagashino and started his career as the supreme commander of the siege of Iwamura Castle. He repelled the Takeda army that had attacked the Oda army at night and defeated more than 1,100, and defeated Takeda clan commander Akiyama Nobutomo to open Iwamura Castle. After that, even in a series of battles with Takeda clan, he would make a big name for himself.

On November 28, 1576, Nobunaga handed over the Oda clan's lord, eastern Mino, and part of Owari Province, and was entrusted with its control. In addition, the younger brother of Nohime, Saito Toshiharu, became an aide (chief vassal) to Nobutada. In the same year, he was placed under the fifth rank, and he was appointed to Dewasuke (出羽介) and then Akita Josuke, aiming to become a shogun. Since Yoshiaki Ashikaga was still a shogun, which ordinarily means a general in Bingo Province even under the Oda administration, the Oda clan had no choice but to become a shogun. It is also said that this official position was meaningful in opposition to the Uesugi family, who was also the guardian of Echigo.

In February of the 5th year of Tensho (1577), Nobutada attacked Nakano Castle and captured it, and in March, Suzuki Shigehide (Sonichi Saika) and others surrendered to him . In August, he became the supreme general of the rebellious subjugation of Matsunaga Hisahide, and commanded generals such as Hosokawa Fujitaka and Akechi Mitsuhide, who lead his army, and captured Shigisan Castle, where Matsunaga Hisahide and his son, Matsunaga Hisamichi barricaded themselves. Due to his achievements, he was ordained to the third rank (従三位) Sakonoefu (左近衛府中将) on October 15. From around this time, he took command of the generals as a general in place of Nobunaga. On December 28, eight types of tea utensils that Nobunaga had were handed over, and on the following day, three more types were handed over.

In 1578, Mori Terumoto, the head of the Mori clan, mobilized a large army of more than 100,000 to recapture Kōzuki Castle in Harima Province. Terumoto himself set up main camp near Takamatsu castle, and he made his main vassals, such as Kobayakawa Takakage, Ukita Tadaie, and the Murakami Navy to deploy to Harima Province and surround Kōzuki Castle with their army of 61,000 people. Nobunaga also sent Nobutada as supreme general, along with Akechi Mitsuhide, Niwa Nagahide, Takigawa Kazumasu and other generals as reinforcements to rescue Kōzuki Castle. Hideyoshi Hashiba, who is surrounding Miki castle, also came under Nobutada's command, totaling 70,000. 2,000 Oda troops deployed to Harima. However, due to the stalemate, Nobunaga ordered the withdrawal from Kozuki Castle for strategic reasons and devoted himself to the capture of Miki Castle. Amago Katsuhisa, the master and servant of the castle, who had been waiting for Oda's reinforcements for three months, surrendered, and Kozuki Castle fell .

On October 4, 1578, Saito Toshiharu, Nobutada's uncle-in-law, was dispatched by Nobunaga as the general reinforcement of Jinbo Nagazumi. Nobutada also sent reinforcements with his vassals stationed in Mino and Owari.

He also took part in the suppression of Araki Murashige's rebellion (Siege of Itami) that broke out in Settsu province from the same year to the following year, Tensho 9 (1579).

In 1580, Sakuma Nobumori, who was in charge of southern Owari, and Ando Morinari, one of the three Mino Triumvirate, were banished, expanding the territory of Nobutada's control in the two countries of Mino and Owari.

== Conquest of Koshu ==
In the 10th year of Tensho (1582), Nobutada began the conquest of Koshu (Kai province) by leading an army of 50,000 Mino and Owari troops. As the supreme commander, he advanced into Takeda territory with Tokugawa Ieyasu and Hojo Ujimasa. Nobutada was accompanied by Kawajiri Hidetaka and Takigawa Kazumasu, and marched from Ina to capture Ida Castle and Takato Castle, Takeda bases in southern Shinano province. In the Siege of Takato castle, Nobutada stood at the forefront of his army and rushed into the moat, breached a barrier, climbed onto the rampart, and inspired his soldiers to attack.

Takeda Katsuyori could not regain his position due to Nobutada's rapid advance and withdrew from Suwa. He then burned Shinpu Castle and escaped. Nobutada pursued the Takeda forces. Before Nobunaga's main corps entered Takeda's territory, Nobutada engaged the Takeda at the Battle of Tenmokuzan. Takeda Katsuyori and his son Nobuyuki committed seppuku and the Takeda clan was destroyed.

Nobunaga entered Kofu on March 26. He praised Nobutada's military service and gave him a sword (梨地蒔). He also expressed his intention to "take the ritual of the world." At that time, Nobutada declined, but from Nobunaga's point of view, reign over the Oda clan as well as all the world's people would be inherited by Nobutada. Kawajiri Hidetaka was given Kai Province (excluding Anayama Baisetsu) and Suwa-gun, Shinano Province, for his service. Mori Nagayoshi was given Takai, Mizuuchi, Sarashina, and Ina-gun in Shinano Province. Mori Nagayoshi was given Ina-gun, Shinano Province. These events greatly influenced the four countries of Mino, Owari, Kai, and Shinano.

== Honnō-ji incident ==
In 1582, his father was forced to commit suicide when one of his generals, Akechi Mitsuhide attacked him while he was staying at Honno-ji, a Buddhist temple in Kyoto. Nobutada was quartered nearby, where he was attacked by Akechi's men and also committed seppuku.

== Family ==
- Father: Oda Nobunaga (1534–1582)
- Mother: Kitsuno (1528–1566), posthumous name: Kyuankeiju (久庵慶珠)
- Adopted Mother: Nohime
- Brothers:
  - Oda Nobukatsu (1558–1630)
  - Oda Nobutaka (1558–1583)
  - Hashiba Hidekatsu (1567–1585)
  - Oda Katsunaga (1568–1582)
  - Oda Nobuhide (1571–1597)
  - Oda Nobutaka (1576–1602)
  - Oda Nobuyoshi (1573–1615)
  - Oda Nobusada (1574–1624)
  - Oda Nobuyoshi (died 1609)
  - Oda Nagatsugu (died 1600)
  - Oda Nobumasa (1554–1647)
- Sisters:
  - Tokuhime (1559–1636)
  - Fuyuhime (1561–1641)
  - Hideko (died 1632)
  - Eihime (1574–1623)
  - Hōonin
  - Sannomarudono(d. 1603)
  - Tsuruhime
- Wives:
  - Matsuhime, daughter of Takeda Shingen
  - Daughter of Shiokawa Nagamitsu
  - Unknown concubine(s)
- Sons:
  - Oda Hidenobu – eldest son
  - Oda Hidenori (1581–1625), married daughter of Hashiba Hidekatsu
