= Keitoku-in =

Buddhist temple in Kōshū, Yamanashi, Japan

- 大泉寺
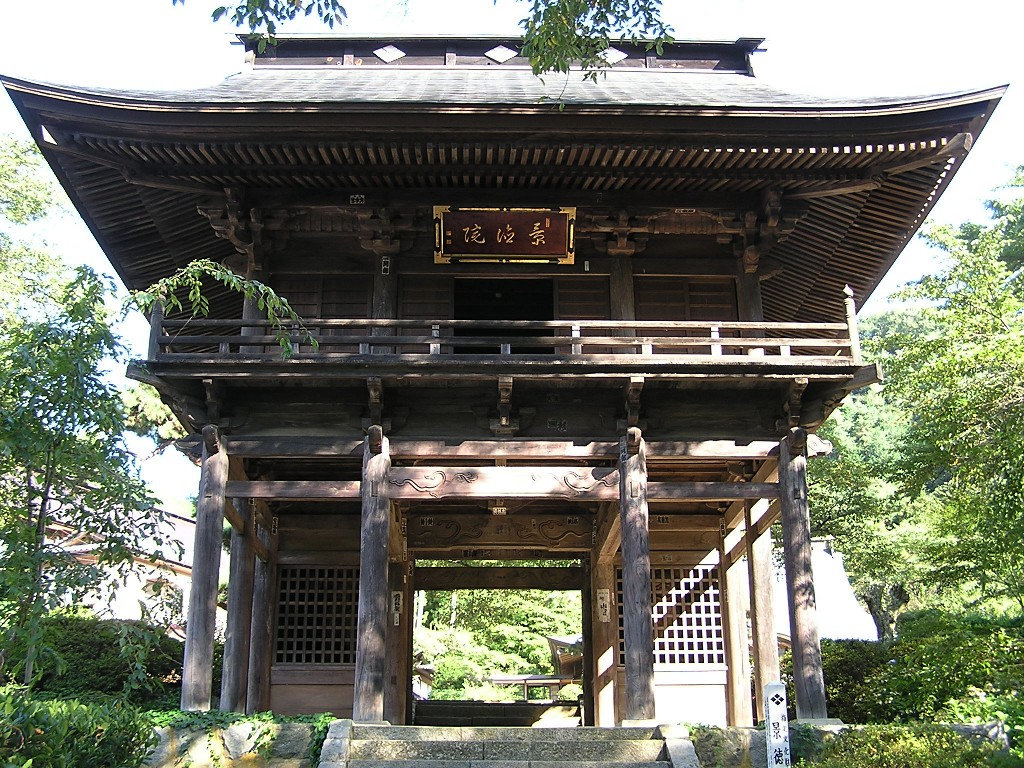
- Keitoku-in Sanmon gate

- Location within Yamanashi Prefecture Location within Japan

Religion
- Affiliation: Buddhist
- Deity: Shakyamuni Buddha
- Rite: Sōtō Zen
- Status: functional

Location
- Location: Tano Owadamachi, Kōshū-shi, Yamanashi-ken
- Coordinates: 35°38′27.6″N 138°48′13.4″E

Architecture
- Founder: Tokugawa Ieyasu
- Completed: 1589
- Yamanashi Prefecture Historic Site

Keitoku-in (景徳院) is a Buddhist temple located in the Tano Owadamachi neighborhood of the city of [[Kōshū, Yamanashi]|Kōshū]], Yamanashi Prefecture, Japan. It belongs to the Sōtō school of Japanese Zen and its honzon is a statue of Shakyamuni Buddha. The temple's full name is Tendōzan Keitoku-in (天童山 景徳院). It is also known as Tano-dera . The precincts of the temple are designated as a Yamanashi Prefectural Historic Siteand the temple's Sanmon gate (completed in 1779) is a Yamanashi Prefecture Tangible Cultural Property.

== History ==
Keitoku-in is located in the eastern part of the prefecture, southeast of Koshu City. It lies on the left bank of the upper reaches of the Hikawa Valley, with the Kōshū Kaidō highway running to the west. In 1582, Takeda Katsuyori, warlord of Kai Province was defeated by a coalition of Oda Nobunaga and Tokugawa Ieyasu, and after abandoning his stronghold of Shinpu Castle sought refuge with his trusted retainer Oyamada Nobushige. However, on reaching Oyamada Nobushige's stronghold in Tano, he found that the gates were locked against him, and that Oyamada had betrayed him. The Takeda forces were annihilated at the Battle of Tenmokuzan and Takeda Katsuyori fell in battle. Later the same year, Kai Province became part of the territory of Tokugawa Ieyasu. Many former Takeda retainers pledged fealty to Tokugawa Ieyasu, and return, the land in Tano where Takeda Katsuyori had been betrayed and killed was donated as land for a memorial temple. This temple, Keitoku-in, was named after Takeda Katsuyori's dharma name, and was completed in 1589, according to the Edo period history Kai no Kuni Shi (History of Kai Province). The temple gradually declined in the Edo period, and was for a time without a resident priest. It was later made a branch of the temple of Sōnei-ji in Shimōsa Province at the request of former Takeda retainers who were now shogunate officials. During the Tenpō era (1830-1844), a fire destroyed the main temple buildings, and fires also occurred during the Kōka era (1844-1848) and the Meiji period.

=== Grave of Takeda Katsuyori ===
The Grave of Takeda Katsuyori (武田勝頼の墓) is a large hōkyōintō stone pagoda. It is flanked by smaller gorintō which are the graves of his son Takeda Nobukatsu (to the left) and his wife Keirin'in, the daughter of Hōjō Ujiyasu (to the right), all situated on a rectangular base. According to the inscription on the central hōkyōintō pagoda, Katsuyori's tomb is a memorial centotaph erected in 1775 on the 200th anniversary of his death. It is located behind the mausoleum called "Koshōden" on the south side of the Keitoku-in grounds. The site is a Yamanashi Prefecture Designated Historic Site.

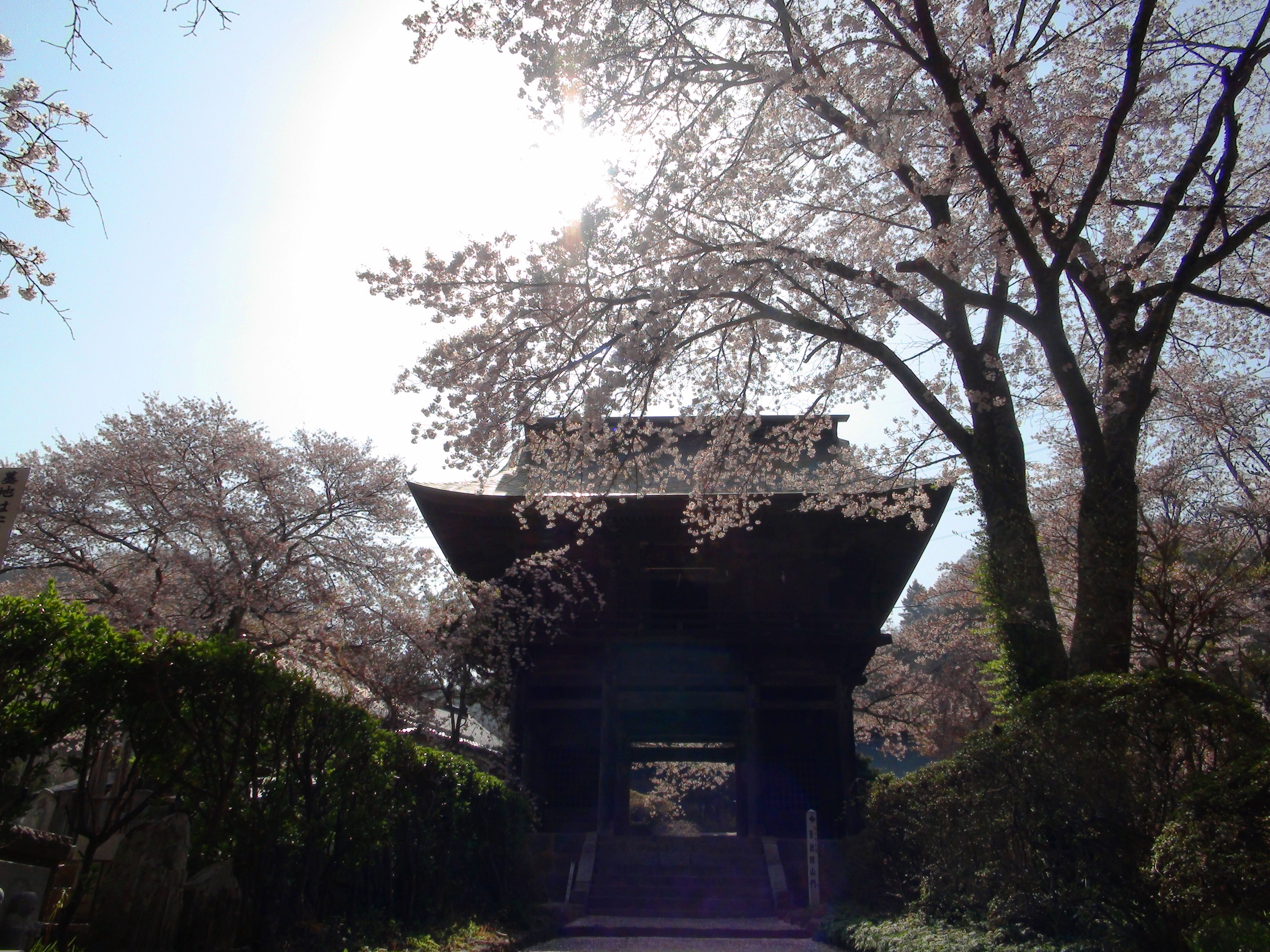
Keitoku-in sakura

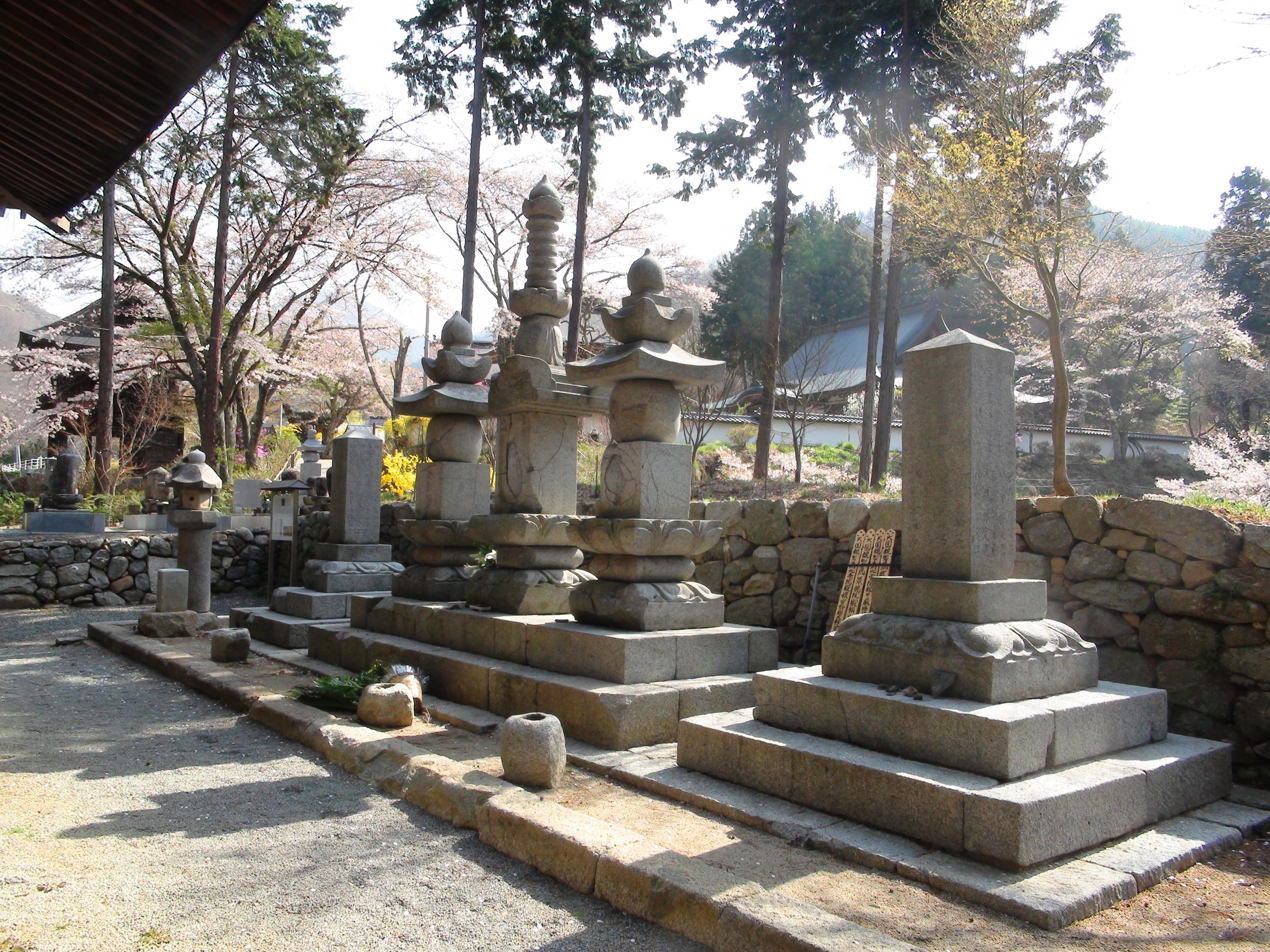
Grave of Takeda Katsuyori.JPG

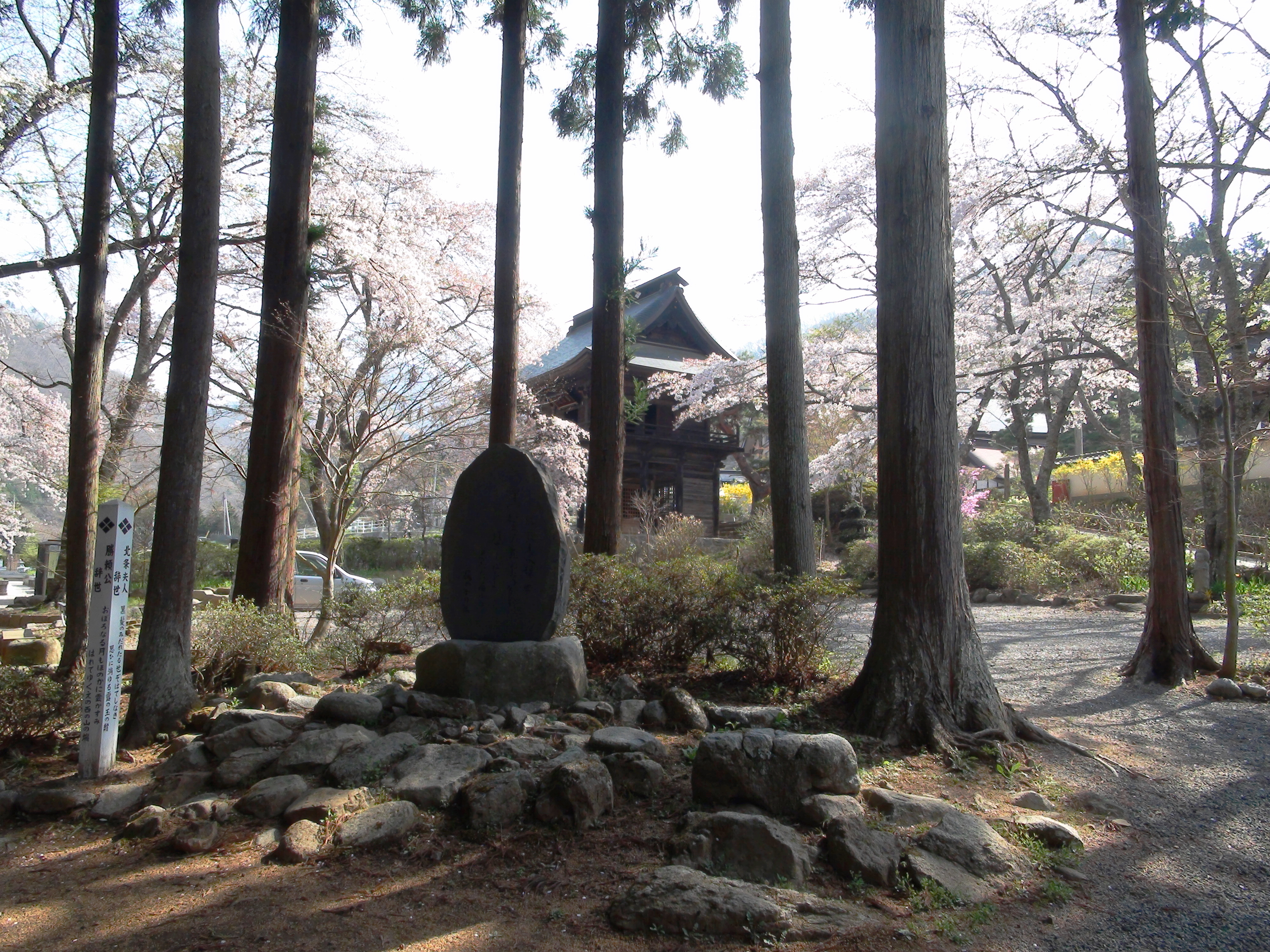
Precincts

== See also ==
- List of Historic Sites of Japan (Yamanashi)
