= Matsuida Castle =

Castle in Nagano, Japan

- 松井田城
- Annaka, Gunma Prefecture, Japan

Site information
- Type: Yamajiro-style castle
- Controlled by: Annaka clan, Takeda clan, Go-Hōjō clan
- Condition: ruins

Location
- Coordinates: 36.3224°N 138.7925°E

Site history
- Built: Muromachi period
- Built by: Annaka clan
- Demolished: 1590
- Events: Siege of Matsuida Castle

Garrison information
- Past commanders: Annaka Tadamasa, Daidōji Masashige

Matsuida Castle (松井田城, Matsuida-jō)) is the remains of a castle structure in Annaka, Gunma Prefecture, Japan.

After Go-Hōjō's army defeated Takigawa Kazumasu's army in the Battle of Shintsugawa, Matsuida Castle was seized and controlled by the Go-Hōjō clan.

Daidōji Masashige expanded and improved the defences of the castle against a possible invasion of the Toyotomi clan. In 1590, after the outbreak of the Siege of Odawara, the castle was besieged by a big army of the Toyotomi clan and attacked by Maeda Toshiie, Uesugi Kagekatsu and Sanada Masayuki. Masashige surrendered after about a month of siege.

Its ruins have been protected as a Town designated historic site.
