= Battle of Tenmokuzan =

1582 battle in Japan

- Part of the Sengoku period
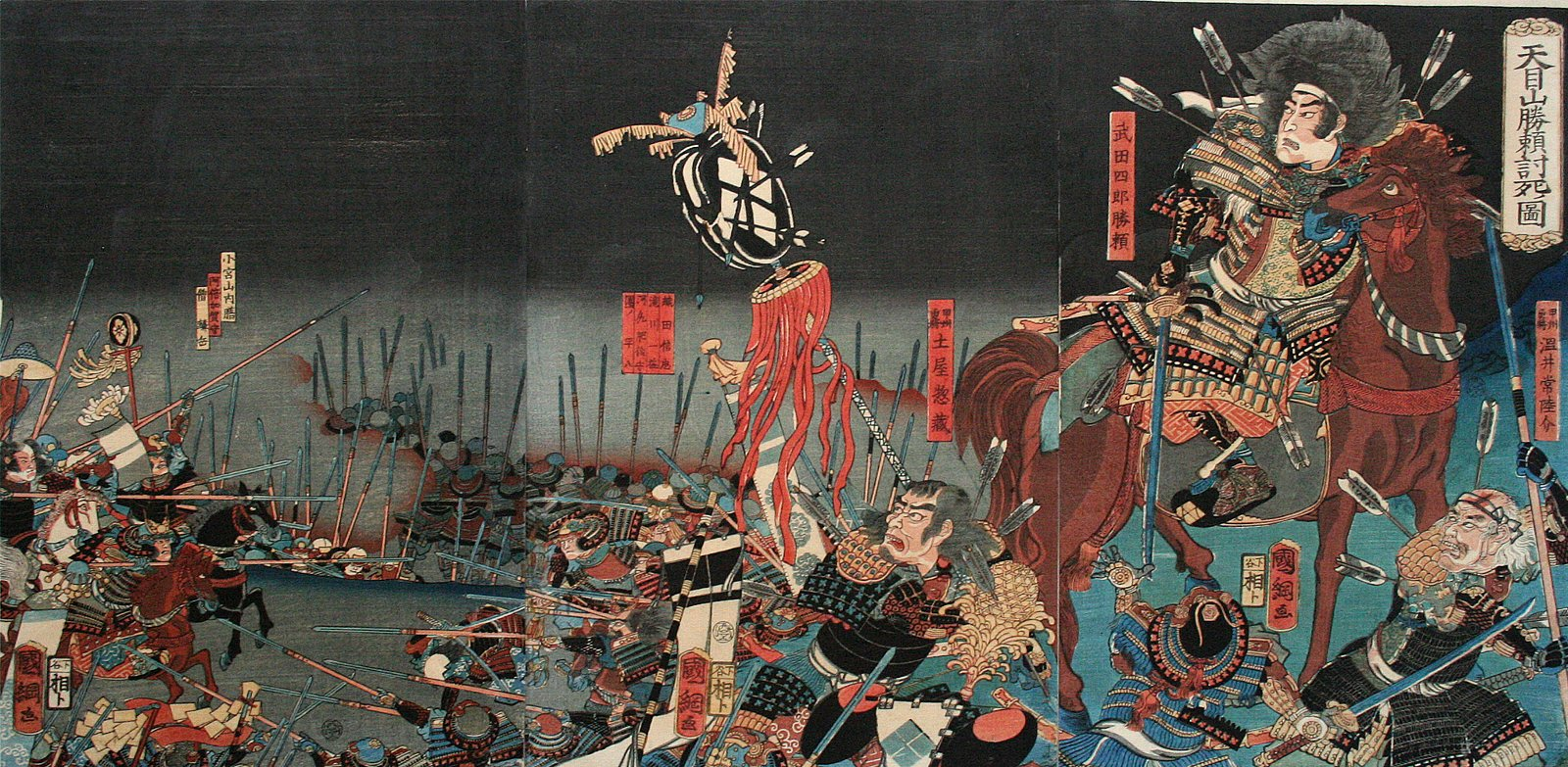
- Edo period scroll depicting the last battle of Takeda Katsuyori
Date	11 March 1582
Location	Tenmoku Mountain, Kai Province, Japan 35°39′03″N 138°48′45″E
Result	Oda victory , Takeda clan eradicated

Belligerents
Forces of Oda Nobunaga, Tokugawa Ieyasu and Hojo Ujimasa	Forces of Takeda Katsuyori

Commanders and leaders
Oda Nobutada; Oda Nagamasu; Takigawa Kazumasu; Kawajiri Hidetaka; Tokugawa Ieyasu; Hojo Ujimasa	Takeda Katsuyori †; Hojo Masako †; Oyamada Nobushige (executed)

Strength
4,000	40+

Casualties and losses
	Entire army destroyed
- Location within Yamanashi Prefecture Battle of Tenmokuzan (Japan)

The 1582 Battle of Tenmokuzan (天目山の戦い, Tenmokuzan no Tatakai) in Japan, is regarded as the last stand of the Takeda clan. This was the final attempt by Takeda Katsuyori to resist the forces of Oda Nobunaga, who had been campaigning against him for some time. In his bid to hide from his pursuers, Katsuyori burned his fortress at Shinpu Castle and fled into the mountains, to another Takeda stronghold, called Iwadono, held by Oyamada Nobushige, an old Takeda retainer. Katsuyori was denied entry by Oyamada, and committed suicide with his wife, while the last remnant of his army held off their pursuers.

== Prelude ==
War by the Takeda clan against Oda Nobunaga began in 1572 with the Battle of Mikatagahara, where Takeda Shingen, lord of Kai, Shinano and Suruga provinces, defeated the combined forces of Oda Nobunaga and Tokugawa Ieyasu in Totomi province. Shingen's heir Takeda Katsuyori was decisively defeated in the battle of Nagashino (1575), losing more than 10,000 men and the core of his generals. However, thanks to Oda Nobunaga's engagement on other fronts (mostly his war against the Ikko-Ikki from 1570–1580), Takeda Katsuyori managed to preserve his family domain until 1582. In February of 1582, some Takeda retainers in Shinano province defected to Oda Nobunaga. In response, on 14 February Nobunaga's army under his son Oda Nobutada invaded Shinano province from the west, rapidly advancing east as Takeda garrisons defected or surrendered without a fight. The only real battle was the siege of Takato Castle, which was taken by storm on 2 March 1582. At the same time Tokugawa Ieyasu invaded the province of Suruga, which capitulated on 25 February 1582, by defection of some chief retainers and relatives of Takeda Katsuyori.

After the fall of Takato Castle on 2 March, the remaining Takeda garrisons in Shinano Province surrendered without a fight, and Oda Nobutada's army reached the western border of the Takeda home province of Kai. At the same time, Hojo Ujimasa marched to Kai from the east and Tokugawa Ieyasu burst into Kai from Suruga Province on the south, taking Takeda traitor Anayama Genba along as a guide. In the meantime, Takeda Katsuyori and his army of 10–15,000 in Shimpu Castle (at the time capital of Kai) had calculated that Takato Castle would hold for some time, so the swift fall of that mighty fortress in only a day caused massive panic among Takeda supporters. Both generals and common soldiers were distracted by the urge to evacuate their families and children as the enemy armies of 40–50,000 invaded Kai from the south, east and the west, so no plans for defense were made, but the entire Takeda army dispersed in panic: no more than 500-600 samurai remained with Takeda Katsuyori in Shinpu. So at dawn of 3 March (around 6 a.m) Katsuyori set fire to Shinpu Castle and fled east with his family, leaving a great many hostages from noble families of his domain to perish in the flames. Oda Nobutada occupied the old Kai capital of Kōfu on 7 March 1582 and had all of Takeda Katsuyori's family, relations and house elders hunted down and executed. All the remaining samurai of the three provinces of Suruga, Kai and Shinano flocked to Kōfu and proclaimed their allegiance to Nobutada, presenting hostages, and the neighboring province of Kozuke surrendered without a fight.

== Battle ==
Takeda Katsuyori departed Shinpu Castle on 3 March with about 500-600 samurai and more than 200 women and children from his family and kin. They fled east through the mountains of Kai to a mountain castle called Kogakko, where they hoped to find a refuge with old Takeda retainer Oyamada Nobushige. Once they reached Kogakko Castle, Oyamada turned them away, although a week earlier he had invited Katsuyori himself and promised his support. With no fort to hold and no more allies, the remaining Takeda servants and warriors lost hope and dispersed in panic. All along the way men dropped out until only forty-one warriors and some 50 women were left, close kinsmen of Katsuyori who could not run away. They put up a temporary palisade around an ordinary manor house in a village called Tano (east of Kōfu) and made their last camp there.

On 11 March, Oda general Takikawa Sakon picked up information that Takeda Katsuyori and his kin had retreated into the mountains of Kogakko. Takikawa divided up his troops into search parties that scoured the mountains, discovering the Takeda camp at Tano. They immediately surrounded Takeda's makeshift fortifications and attacked. The last 41 Takeda samurai solemnly executed their wives and children and came out fighting with their swords, seeking only an honorable death. They fought like desperate men with nothing to lose and caused many losses to the attackers. The Shinchō Kōki ("Chronicle of Lord Nobunaga") glorifies the valor of the last Takeda warriors, among them Takeda Katsuyori's young lover Tsuchiya Uemon, who felled a great many experienced warriors with his arrows before following his lord in death, and Katsuyori's 16-year-old son Takeda Nobukatsu, who fought with his sword as if he were a grown man.

== Aftermath ==
According to the Shinchō Kōki, the Takeda lost 41 samurai and 50 women, while the Oda lost many experienced warriors. The last stand of the Takeda was such an example of a true samurai spirit and valor in defeat that even this pro-Oda work (written by Ota Guyuchi, an old retainer of Nobunaga) showed unrestrained admiration for the last Takeda samurai, who earned unparalleled fame and renown for themselves in death.

Oyamada Nobushige betrayed Katsuyori at the Battle of Tenmokuzan; however, when he went to the Oda clan camp, he was executed by Oda Nobunaga's officer Horio Yoshiharu.
