= Kawajiri Hidetaka =

Japanese samurai (1527–1582)

- 河尻秀隆
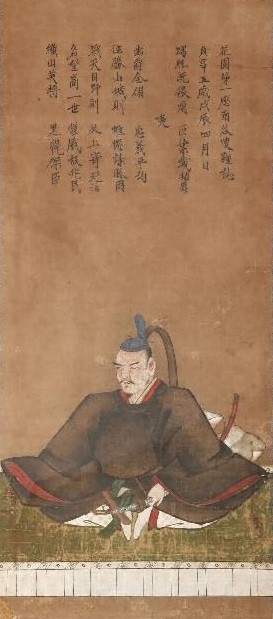
- Kawajiri Hidetaka, protector of Hizen province

Personal details
- Born: 1527 (the 7th year of Daiei) Owari Province
- Died: 1582 (aged 54–55) (the 10th year of Tensho In Chozo-ji, temple in Sakahogi, Gifu
- Relations: Kawajiri Chikashige (father)
- Children: Hidenaga (秀長); Shigeyuki (鎮行); Suemori-dono (末守殿) (Doi Chikazane’s wife)
- Nickname(s): 与四郎 (Yoshiro) 与兵衛 (Yohē) 鎮吉 (Shigeyoshi)

Military service
- Allegiance: Oda clan
- Rank: protector of Hizen province
- Unit: Kawajiri clan
- Battles/wars: Battle of Azukisaka; Battle of Okehazama; Mino Campaign; Ise Campaign; Battle of Anegawa; Omi Campaign; Siege of Sawayama; Siege of Shiga; Siege of Mount Hiei; Siege Of Saimyoji; Siege of Takatō; Battle of Tenmokuzan

Kawajiri Hidetaka (河尻 秀隆; 1527 – 1582) was a Japanese samurai warrior during the Sengoku period, he was served Oda Nobuhide and was one of the vassals of Oda Nobunaga. He was the first samurai in the "Kuro-horo-shu" (bodyguard unit in black) elite troops selected from Nobunaga's aides, and later served as an assistant to Oda Nobutada, Nobunaga's eldest son. He was also the lord of Mino Iwamura, and later became the lord of Kai province. There are few documents related to Hidetaka and Kawajiri clan, and many of his traces are recorded in Shinchō Kōki, Koyo Gunkan, and records related to Tokugawa clan.

== Biography ==
=== Service under Nobuhide ===
It is said that he was born in Iwasaki Village, Owari Province. Hidetaka served Oda Nobuhide from an early stage. His given name's kanji spelling, with 秀 for hide, is considered to be from Nobuhide's name, which was also spelled with 秀 for hide.

In August 1542, at age 16, he participated in the first Battle of Azukizaka as a vassal of Nobuhide. He fought with ashigaru commander Yuhara (由原), who was the forerunner of the Imagawa clan, and defeated him at the battle's end.

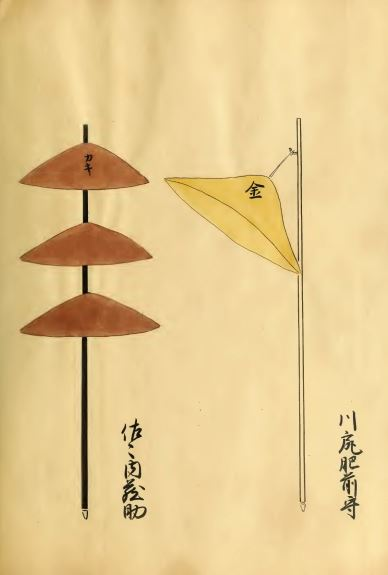
Hidetaka's Uma-jirushi (right side)

=== Service under Nobunaga ===
After Nobuhide's death, he also served Oda Nobunaga and became the head of "Kuro-horo-shu" (bodyguard unit in black). In 1558, when Nobunaga summoned his younger brother Oda Nobuyuki to Kiyosu Castle to murder him, he carried out the assassination of Nobuyuki.

He participated in the Battle of Okehazama in May 1560. He followed Nobunaga, who suddenly rushed out, with only four other vassals: Iwamuro Shigeyasu, Hasegawa Hashisuke, Yamaguchi Hidanokami, and Katō Yasaburo. It is said that Mōri Yoshikatsu defeated Imagawa Yoshimoto in the battle, but there is also a different theory that Hidetaka killed Yoshimoto.

In summer 1565, he was ordered to attack Mino Sarubami Castle near Kiso river with Niwa Nagahide. The castle's owner, Tajimi Shuri-no-Suke, used the advantage of the land to protect the castle well, but Nagahide occupied the neighboring mountain and cut off the water source, and Hidetaka launched an onslaught and dropped the castle. In the battle of Dōhora castle, on September 28, 1565, he breached the inner citadel first and forced the enemy commander Kishi Nobuharu to commit suicide. After the war, he was given Sarubami Castle as a reward for his conduct in the Mino battle, and the castle's name was changed to Katsuyama. Shortly afterwards, the castle town of Sakahogi, Chozoji, was designated as Kawajiri's family temple. He also allegedly supported the reconstruction of Daisen-ji Temple, which was burned down in the war.

In early 1569, he and Sakai Masahisa were sent to tell Imai Sōkyū to hand over the testimony of Sakai Kitasho. In August 1569, he participated in a battle with Kitabatake clan based in Okawachi Castle, Ise province. At this time, he was in charge of patrolling the Oda clan army headquarters, along with Sugaya Nagayori, Harada Naomasa, Nakagawa Shigemasa, and Maeda Toshiie. His name can be seen in the draft letter of sympathy sent by Munehisa Imai to the Oda clan generals on September 6, 1569.

On February 19, 1570, Imai Sokyu sent urgent news that Akagi Nobuyasu defeated the army of Miyoshi clan in Awaji province. In the draft letter, his names are listed alongside Kanamori Nagachika, Takei Yūan, Sakai Kōsai, and Sugaya Naganori, and it can be seen that he was recognized as one of Nobunaga's representative aides at that time. On March 6, 1570, Nakayama Takachika and Kanroji Tsunemoto visited Nobunaga, but Hidetaka responded due to his absence and received 30 swords as a reward.

On June 28, 1570, he served in the Battle of Anegawa, and in the siege of Sawayama Castle, where Isono Kazumasa, a vassal of Azai Nagamasa, was occupying after the main war, he set up in Nishi-Hikoneyama, one of the attached castles.

At the Siege of Shiga in September 1570, he entered the fort of Anota with Sakuma Nobumori, Akechi Mitsuhide, Murai Sadakatsu, and Sassa Narimasa, and played a part in the Siege of Enryaku-ji Temple on Mt. Hiei.

In September 1571, Nobunaga ordered for the Tendai Temple affiliated with Enryaku-ji at Mt. Hiei to be burned down, and Hidetaka and Nagahide burned down Saimyōji temple.

In February 1574, he entered Sawayama Castle after Isono Kazumasa moved out, and since then he was active as a castle general with Niwa Nagahide.

In 1582, while planning the Conquest of Kōshū, Nobunaga assigned an army to his eldest son, Oda Nobutada, and had him invade Shinano and Kai Province. Hidetaka, along with Takigawa Kazumasu, became a military commander under Nobutada.

After the Takeda clan defeated, he was appointed by Nobunaga to control Kai province. However, he ruled tyrannically as he suppressed many former Takeda clan vassals. This caused people of Kai province resented Hidetaka.

== Death ==
During the Tenshō-Jingo war, after Oda Nobunaga was assassinated. Vengeful former Takeda clan retainers assassinated Kawajiri soon afterwards. Kawajiri Hidetaka died on June 18, 1582, aged 54 or 55.

It is said that Hidetaka's corpse was buried upside down because he had incurred so much hatred within Kai Province. For this reason, Kawajirizuka, which is believed to be his grave, is also known as Sakasazuka.

== Bibliography ==
- Takahiro Okuno [in Japanese] (1969). 織田信長文書の研究 (in Japanese). Vol. 上巻. 吉川弘文館.
- Shunroku Shibatsuji [in Japanese] (1981). "織田政権東国進出の意義". 戦国大名領の研究―甲斐武田氏領の展開― (in Japanese). 名著出版.
- Shunroku Shibatsuji (2016). 織田政権の形成と地域支配. 戎光祥研究叢書 第10巻 (in Japanese).
- 岡田正人 (Masato Okada) (1999). 織田信長総合事典 [Oda Nobunaga Comprehensive Encyclopedia] (in Japanese). Yuzankaku.
- Katsuhiro Taniguchi [in Japanese] (1983). "織田信忠軍団の形成と発展". 日本歴史 (in Japanese) (419号)./所収:柴裕之, ed. (2016), 論集 戦国大名と国衆20 織田氏一門 (in Japanese), 岩田書院
- Takeshi Abe [in Japanese]; Keiko Nishimura [in Japanese], eds. (2001), 戦国人名事典 (in Japanese), 新人物往来社
- Hiroko Ikegami [in Japanese] (2012). 織田信長. 人物叢書 (in Japanese). 吉川弘文館.
- Masaru Hirayama [in Japanese] (2015). 増補改訂版 天正壬午の乱 本能寺の変と東国戦国史 (in Japanese). 戎光祥出版.
- 和田裕弘 (Yasuhiro Wada) (2017). 織田信長の家臣団－派閥と人間関係. 中公新書 (in Japanese).
- Kazuhiro Marushima [in Japanese] (2017). 武田勝頼 試される戦国大名の「器量」 (in Japanese). 平凡社.
