= Kiso Yoshimasa =

Japanese samurai

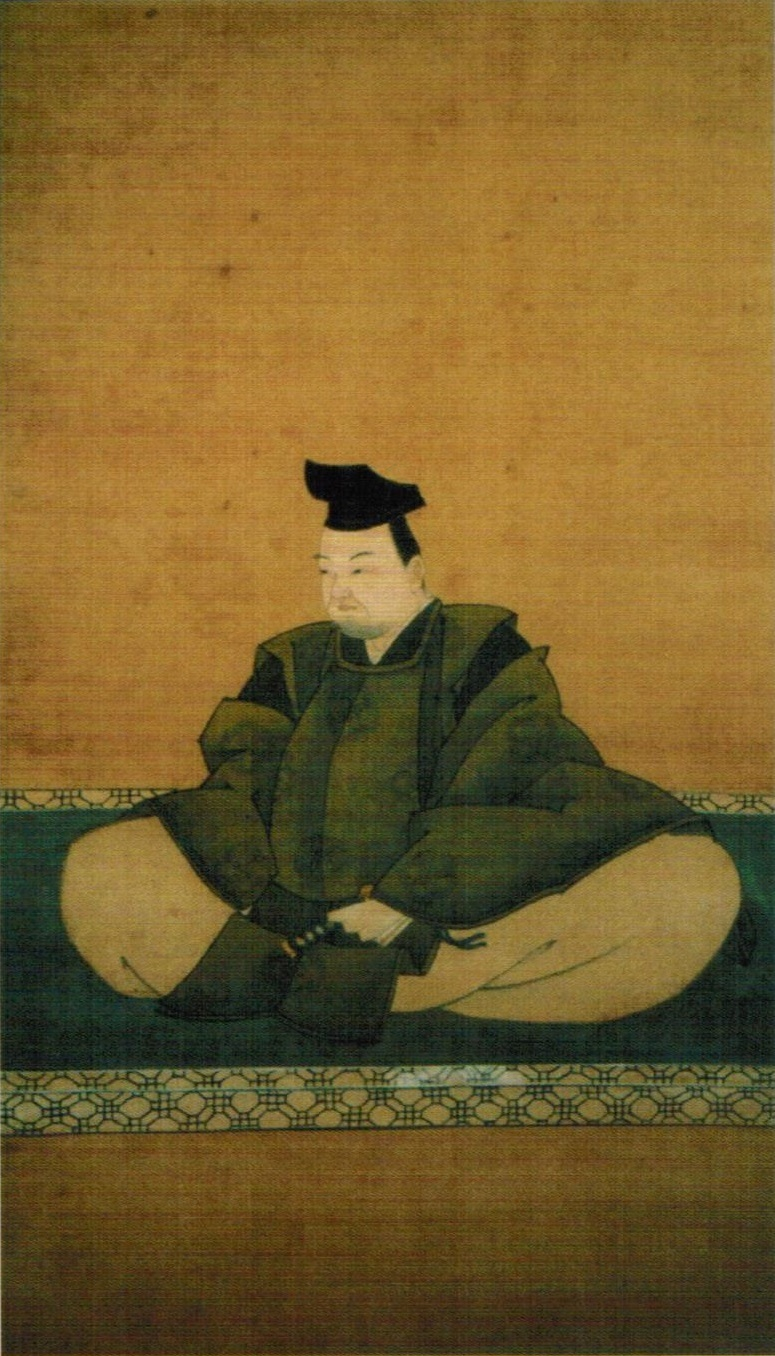
Kiso Yoshimasa

Kiso Yoshimasa (木曾 義昌, 1540 – April 26, 1595) was a Japanese samurai warrior of the Sengoku period. He was a retainer of the Takeda clan of Kai Province. He is known as one of the "Twenty-Four Generals of Takeda Shingen".
