= Daidōji Masashige =

Japanese samurai

- 大道寺 政繁
- Born: 1533
- Died: August 18, 1590 (aged 56–57); Kawagoe
- Military career
- Commands: Matsuida Castle, Kawagoe Castle

Daidōji Masashige (大道寺 政繁; 1533 – 1590) was a Japanese samurai and commander of the Sengoku period. He was one of the most important vassals of the Go-Hōjō clan.

In 1590, when Siege of Odawara began, Matsuida Castle Masashige was defending was surrounded by Toyotomi's large army, and he decided to surrender. After the Siege of Odawara, he was ordered to seppuku by Toyotomi Hideyoshi.

His grave is at Hoda Temple near the Matsuida Castle.
