= Nishina Morinobu =

Retainer of the Japanese samurai clan of Takeda (1557–1582)

Nishina Morinobu

Nishina Morinobu (仁科盛信, 1557 – March 25, 1582) was a retainer of the Japanese samurai clan of Takeda during the closing years of the Sengoku period. Born the fifth son of the legendary Takeda Shingen (by Lady Yukawa), he was also known as Takeda Harukiyo (武田晴清). In 1561 Morinobu was adopted into the Nishina clan of Shinano Province as part of Shingen's plan to cement his control over the province.

When the invasion of the Takeda territory by the Oda-Tokugawa alliance began in late 1581, Morinobu took on the responsibility of defending Takato Castle (高遠城) in southern Shinano, along with one of his allies, Oyamada Masayuki. As he fortified himself in the castle, Oda Nobutada, the designated successor of Oda Nobunaga and commander of the Oda army, sent a Buddhist priest to negotiate surrender.

However, Morinobu responded by cutting off the nose and ears of the priest and was killed in the subsequent attack at the castle. Before he conducted seppuku prior to the fall of the castle, he told Oda soldiers of his prediction of Nobunaga's death, which soon came to pass.
