= Takigawa Kazumasu =

Japanese samurai lord and daimyo (1525-1586)

- 滝川 一益
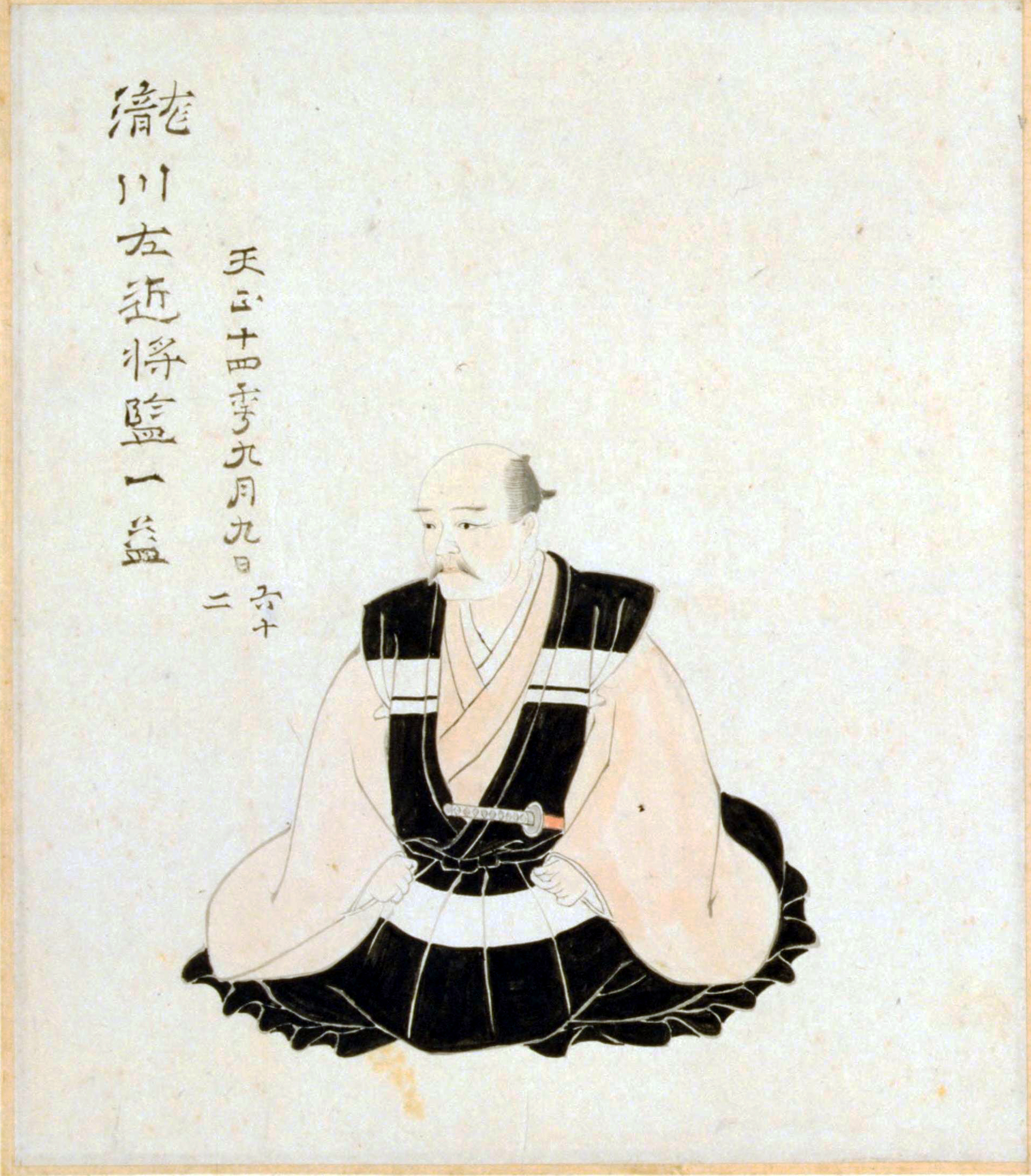

Lord of Nagashima Castle
- In office 1574–1583

Personal details
- Born: 1525 Kōka, Southern Omi Province
- Died: October 21, 1586 (aged 60–61) Echizen Province
- Nickname(s): "Sakonshōgen" "Takikawa Sakon"

Military service
- Allegiance: Oda clan Toyotomi clan
- Commands: Nagashima Castle
- Battles/wars: Ise Campaign; Siege of Nagashima; Battle of Mikatagahara; Siege of Ichijōdani Castle; Battle of Nagashino; Kii Campaign; Siege of Mitsuji; Battle of Tedorigawa; Battle of Kizugawaguchi; Siege of Itami; Tensho Iga War; Siege of Takatō; Battle of Tenmokuzan; Battle of Kanagawa; Battle of Shizugatake; Siege of Kanie

Takigawa Kazumasu (滝川 一益; 1525 – October 21, 1586) or Takikawa Sakon was a Japanese samurai lord and daimyo of the Sengoku period. He was a retainer and military commander of Oda Nobunaga, and later Toyotomi Hideyoshi. His biological son, Toshimasu, was adopted by Maeda Toshihisa, the older brother of Maeda Toshiie. Kazumasu served Nobunaga alongside Toshimasu's adopted uncle, Maeda Toshiie. He was also known as Sakonshōgen (左近将監).

== Early life ==
Kazumasu was born in 1525, in Ōmi Province, the son of Takigawa Kazumasa, the lord of Kawachi-Takayasu Manor. The Takigawa clan descended from the Ki clan. He became one of Oda Nobunaga's staunchest supporters, and served him from around 1558 onward.

== Military life ==
An account cited that Kazumasu served as an envoy for Nobunaga. He was, for instance, sent to Akagawa Motoyasu, one of the 18 generals of the Mori Clan, in the latter's effort of consolidating his power in 1561.

Kazumasu served in the vanguard of the Oda army for two invasions of Ise Province in 1567 and 1568 that crushed numerous families of Ise. He was given land in Ise province around 1569 and supported Oda Nobukatsu, heir to the Kitabatake clan. Later, Nobunaga send Kazumasu on a campaigns against the Ikkō-ikki of Sieges of Nagashima (1571, 1573, 1574).

In 1572, Kazumasu along with Sakuma Nobumori was sent by Oda Nobunaga to provide reinforcement to Tokugawa Ieyasu when he was attacked by Takeda Shingen at Battle of Mikatagahara.

Under Nobunaga, he took part in a great many battles, including the Siege of Ichijodani Castle (1573), the Battle of Nagashino (1575) served as the commander-in-chief of the infantry units. After Nagashino, he participated in the Battle of Tennoji (1576). Later, Nobunaga order him to Conquest Kii province, also aided in the Battle of Tedorigawa (1577).

In 1578, at the Second Battle of Kizugawaguchi, Kazumasu commanded a white ship to accompany the six black ships commanded by Kuki Yoshitaka against Mori navy.

Aside from serving in many of Nobunaga's battles, Kazumasu also rendered service to the Oda through domestic affairs, assisting in the construction of Azuchi castle in 1578 and in land surveys with Akechi Mitsuhide in 1580 in the Yamato province.

In 1579-1581, he fought in the Tenshō Iga War in Iga Province. Kazumasu's achievements include the capture of Seki castle.

In 1582, Kazumasu along with Kawajiri Hidetaka became military commander against Takeda clan last remnants. Later, Kazumasu was appointed Kantō-kanrei (Shōgun's Deputy in the East) by Nobunaga; in this post, with a portion of Kōzuke Province as his domain, he was assigned to keep an eye on the powerful Hōjō clan, based at Odawara.

Following Nobunaga's death in 1582, Kazumasu defended Oda territory, but lost in the Battle of Kanagawa (1582) against Hojo clan and back to Ise Province.

In 1583, he and Shibata Katsuie along with many of the Oda retainers, initially opposed Toyotomi Hideyoshi, but he was defeated defending Kameyama Castle (Mie), after Hideyoshi used mines to bring down the castle.

Takigawa Kazumasu's standard was three red circles arranged vertically.

== Death ==
After Kazumasu submitted to Hideyoshi and assisted during the Komaki Campaign (1584) by attacking Kanie castle along with Kuki Yoshitaka. When he performed badly for killing his cousin, Maeda Tanetoshi, in this campaign, he shaved his head, become a Buddhist monk and retired from battle in shame. He is thought to have died in Echizen around 1586.
