= Anayama Nobutada =

Japanese samurai

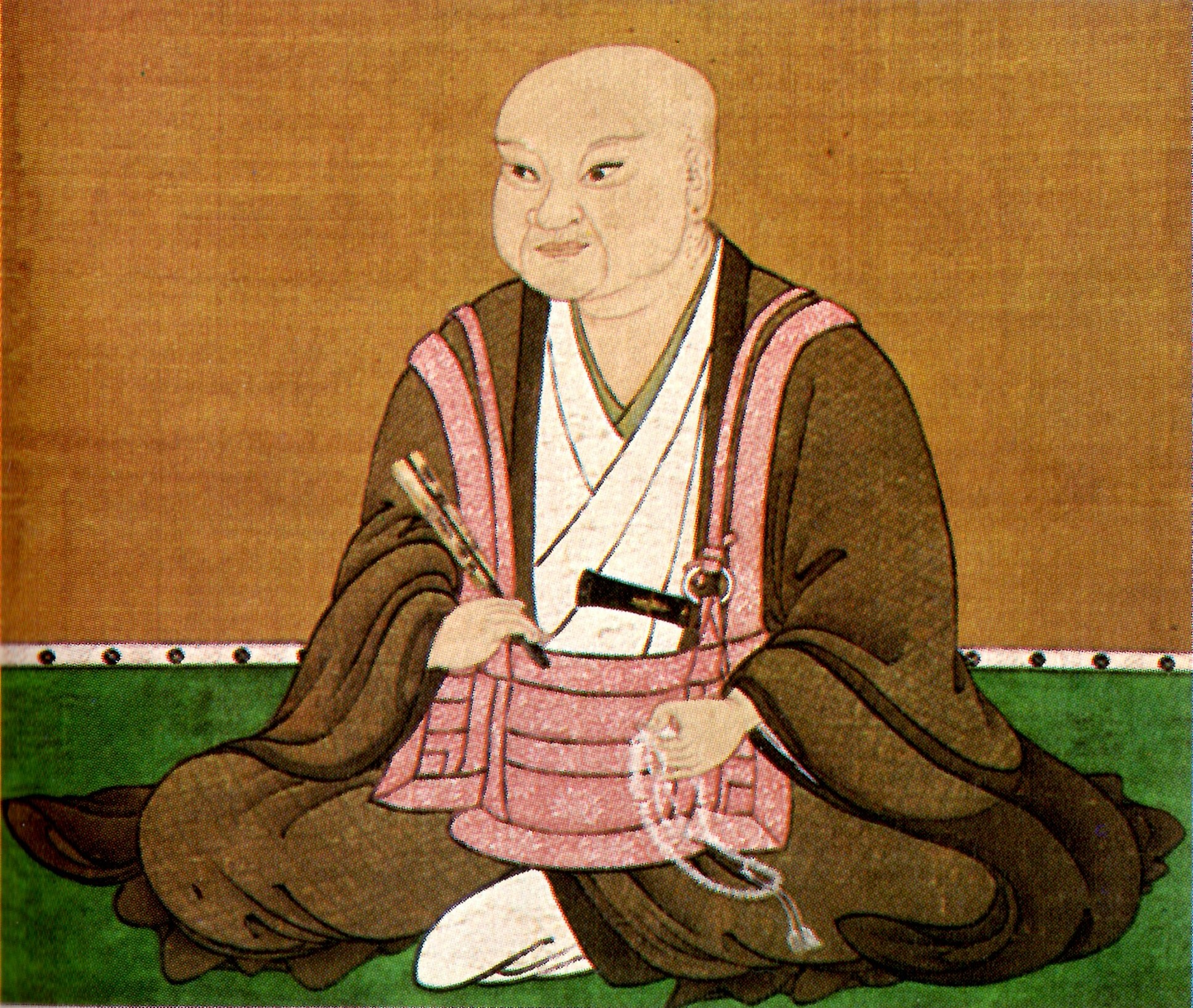
- Native name: 穴山 信君
- Nicknames: Anayama Genba Nobukimi Baisetsu Nobutada Anayama Baisetsu
- Born: 1541
- Died: June 21, 1582 (aged 40–41)
- Allegiance: Takeda clan
- Conflicts: Battle of Kawanakajima (1561); Battle of Mikatagahara (1573); Battle of Nagashino (1575)
- Awards: Fief in the Shinano Province
- Spouse: Kenshōin
- Children: Anayama Nobukimi (1572-1587)

Anayama Nobutada (穴山 信君; 1541 – June 21, 1582), also known as Anayama Genba Nobukimi (in Chronicle of Lord Nobunaga), Baisetsu Nobutada or Anayama Baisetsu, was a Japanese samurai. He became famous as one of the "Twenty-Four Generals of Takeda Shingen". He was lord of Yokoyama Castle and govern on Ejiri Castle at Suruga Province.

== Personal life ==
He was the son of Anayama Nobutomo and a nephew of Takeda Shingen, being a son of his elder sister Nanshōin. He was married to his first cousin, Shingen's daughter Kenshōin. He had one son, Anayama Nobukimi, who lived for just fifteen years, 1572 to 1587.

== Military life ==
He fought at the Battle of Kawanakajima (1561) against Uesugi Kenshin for his uncle, at the Battle of Mikatagahara (1573) against Tokugawa Ieyasu under Takeda Katsuyori, and at the Battle of Nagashino against the Oda and Tokugawa clans.

In 1582, enticed by Oda Nobunaga during his final invasion of the Takeda domain in Shinano, Suruga and Kai, he defected to serve Tokugawa Ieyasu and surrendered his castle in Suruga Province, aiding Ieyasu in his campaign against Takeda Katsuyori. Until this treason, he was considered one of the principal pillars of the house of Takeda.

== Death ==
During the Honnō-ji Incident, Anayama Nobutada, who had become an ally to the Nobunaga and Tokugawa clans, was ambushed by the Ochimusha-gari during the journey, and killed along with some of his retainers.
