= Kai Province =

Former province of Japan

Map of Japanese provinces (1868) with Kai Province highlighted

Kai Province (甲斐国, Kai no Kuni; Japanese pronunciation: [kä́(.)ì (nò̞ kɯ̈̀.ɲ̟ì)] (Note: The placename is only pronounced like this with an accent. The common noun meaning "worthwhileness" is pronounced [kä̀í] without an accent.)) was a province of Japan in the area of Japan that is today Yamanashi Prefecture. Kai bordered on Sagami, Suruga, Shinano and Musashi Provinces. Its abbreviated form name was Kōshū (甲州; [kó̞ò̞.ɕɨ̀ɨ̀]). The origin of its name is uncertain. It lies in central Honshū, west of Tokyo, in a landlocked mountainous region that includes Mount Fuji along its border with modern Shizuoka Prefecture.

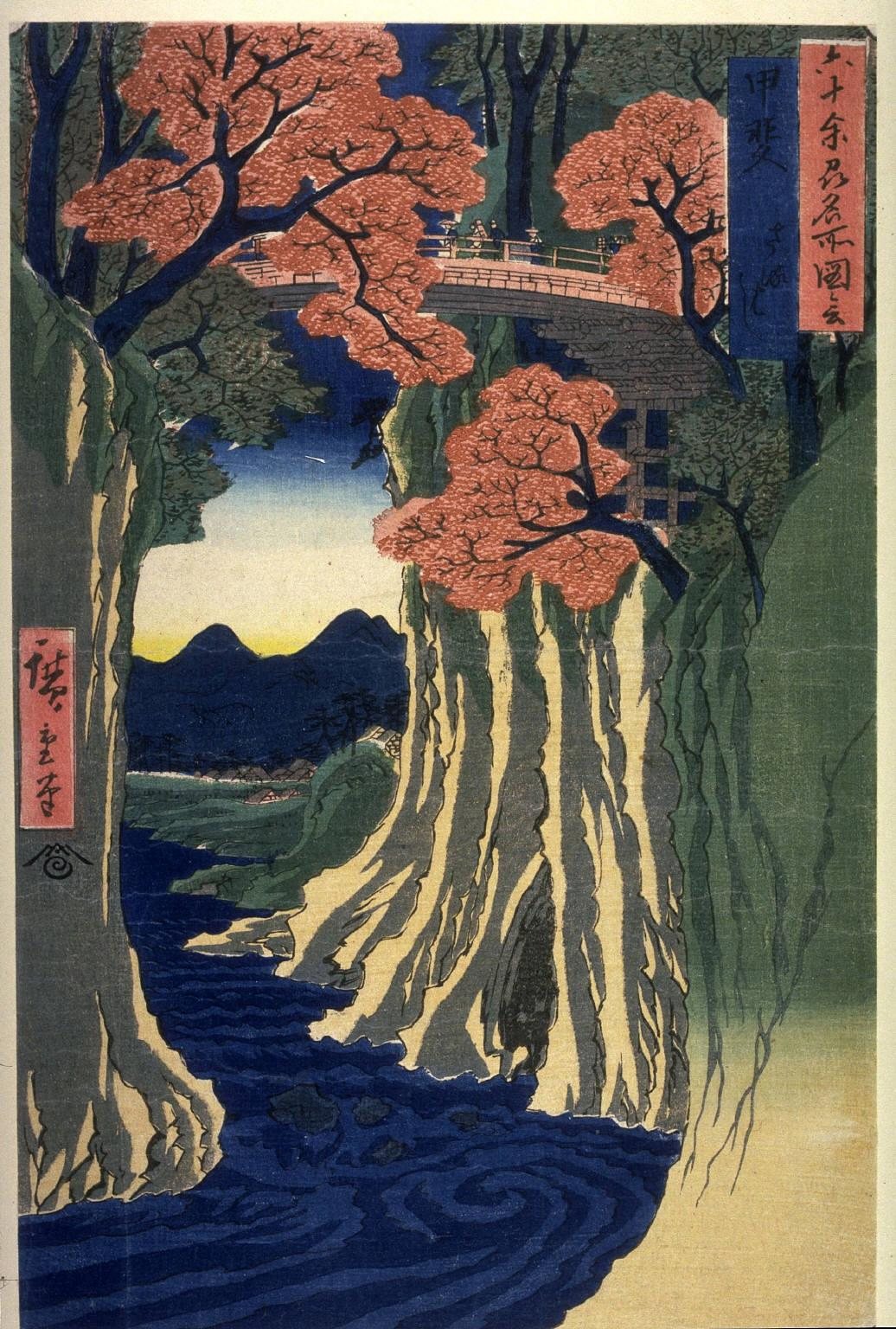
Hiroshige ukiyo-e "Kai" in "The Famous Scenes of the Sixty States" (六十余州名所図会), depicting the Saruhashi, a bridge in what is now Ōtsuki, Yamanashi.

== History ==
Kai was one of the original provinces of Japan established in the Nara period under the Taihō Code. The original capital of the province was located in what is now Fuefuki. Under the Engishiki classification system, Kai was ranked as a "superior country" (上国) in terms of importance, and one of the 16 "middle countries" (中国) in terms of distance from the capital. Although not directly on the Tōkaidō, it was also included as one of the Tōkaidō provinces.

Numerous remains from the Kofun period have been found in Kai. During the Heian period, the area came under the control of the Kai Genji, who controlled the province throughout the Kamakura period. During the Sengoku period, a branch of the clan, the Takeda clan rose to prominence. The warlord Takeda Shingen, ruled Kai from his stronghold at Kōfu and expanded the holdings of the clan to include Shinano and Suruga Provinces, and engaged in constant warfare against the Uesugi clan in Echigo Province. After the Takeda were defeated by a coalition led by Oda Nobunaga and Tokugawa Ieyasu, Kai Province came briefly under the rule of Nobunaga’s retainer Kawajiri Hidetaka. After Nobunaga’s assassination at the Honnō-ji Incident, the province was contested between Tokugawa Ieyasu and the Go-Hōjō clan based in Odawara. The Tokugawa clan, the Uesugi clan and the Hōjō clan each aspired to seize the vast area in Shinano Province, Ueno region, and Kai Province, which ruled by the remnants of the many small clans formerly serving Takeda clan, following of disorder post death of Nobunaga, at the same time with Ieyasu departure an army of 8,000 soldiers to those disputed region. This caused the triangle conflict between those three factions in the event which dubbed by historians as Tenshō-Jingo War broke out. (Note: The name of "Tenshō-Jingo War" was coined by Tashiro Takashi in 1980. Furthermore, is also a theory that from the perspective that local powers which continued to fight over the possession of the Oda clan's leftover territories, there is evidence that Tokugawa Ieyasu's transfer to the Kantō region following the fall of the Hōjō clan in 1590 and the placement of Toyotomi-line daimyo, until transfer of Uesugi Kagekatsu to Aizu, where the local daimyo were separated from their former territory and the establishment of control by the Azuchi–Momoyama period, was considered to be the extension of this conflict.) As the war turned in favor of Tokugawa clan, combined with the defection of Sanada Masayuki to the Tokugawa faction, the Hōjō clan now negotiate truce with Ieyasu. The Hōjō clan then sent Hōjō Ujinobu as representative, while the Tokugawa sent Ii Naomasa as representative for the pre eliminary meetings. Furthermore, in October, representatives from the Oda clan such as Oda Nobukatsu, Oda Nobutaka, and Toyotomi mediated the negotiation until the truce officially concluded.

However, after the destruction of the Go-Hōjō by Toyotomi Hideyoshi in 1590, the province was ruled by a succession of Toyotomi loyalists.

With the establishment of the Tokugawa shogunate, Kai was regarded as strategically important to the defense of Edo due to its position between the Tōkaidō and Nakasendō highways, which were connected through Kai Province by the Kōshū Kaidō. Kai Province was entrusted briefly to Tokugawa clan members or the highly trusted Yanagisawa clan from 1705-1724 as Kōfu Domain, but for the most part was retained as tenryō territory ruled directly by the shogunate through a succession of hatamoto-class daikan.

After the Meiji Restoration, Kai province was renamed Kōfu Prefecture in 1869. With the abolition of the han system in 1871, it was renamed Yamanashi Prefecture.

== Historical districts ==
Kai Province consisted of nine districts (originally consisted of traditionally four):

- Yamanashi Prefecture
  - Koma District (巨摩郡)
    - Kitakoma District (北巨摩郡) - dissolved
    - Minamikoma District (南巨摩郡)
    - Nakakoma District (中巨摩郡)
  - Tsuru District (都留郡)
    - Kitatsuru District (北都留郡)
    - Minamitsuru District (南都留郡)
  - Yamanashi District (山梨郡)
    - Higashiyamanashi District (東山梨郡) - dissolved
    - Nishiyamanashi District (西山梨郡) - dissolved
  - Yatsushiro District (八代郡)
    - Higashiyatsushiro District (東八代郡) - dissolved
    - Nishiyatsushiro District (西八代郡)

== Highways ==
- Kōshū Kaidō – connecting Edo with Shimosuwa on the Nakasendo
- Nakasendō – connecting Edo with Kyoto

== See also ==
- Kōfu Domain

== Appendix ==
=== Bibliography ===
- Hirayama, Yū (2011), 武田遺領をめぐる動乱と秀吉の野望 [Takeda's Territory and Hideyoshi's Ambitions], 戎光祥出版, ISBN 978-4-86403-035-9
- Hirayama, Yū (2015). 天正壬午の乱 [Tensho-Jingo war] (増補改訂版 ed.). 戎光祥出版. ISBN 978-4-86403-170-7.
