= Bushido =

Moral code of the samurai

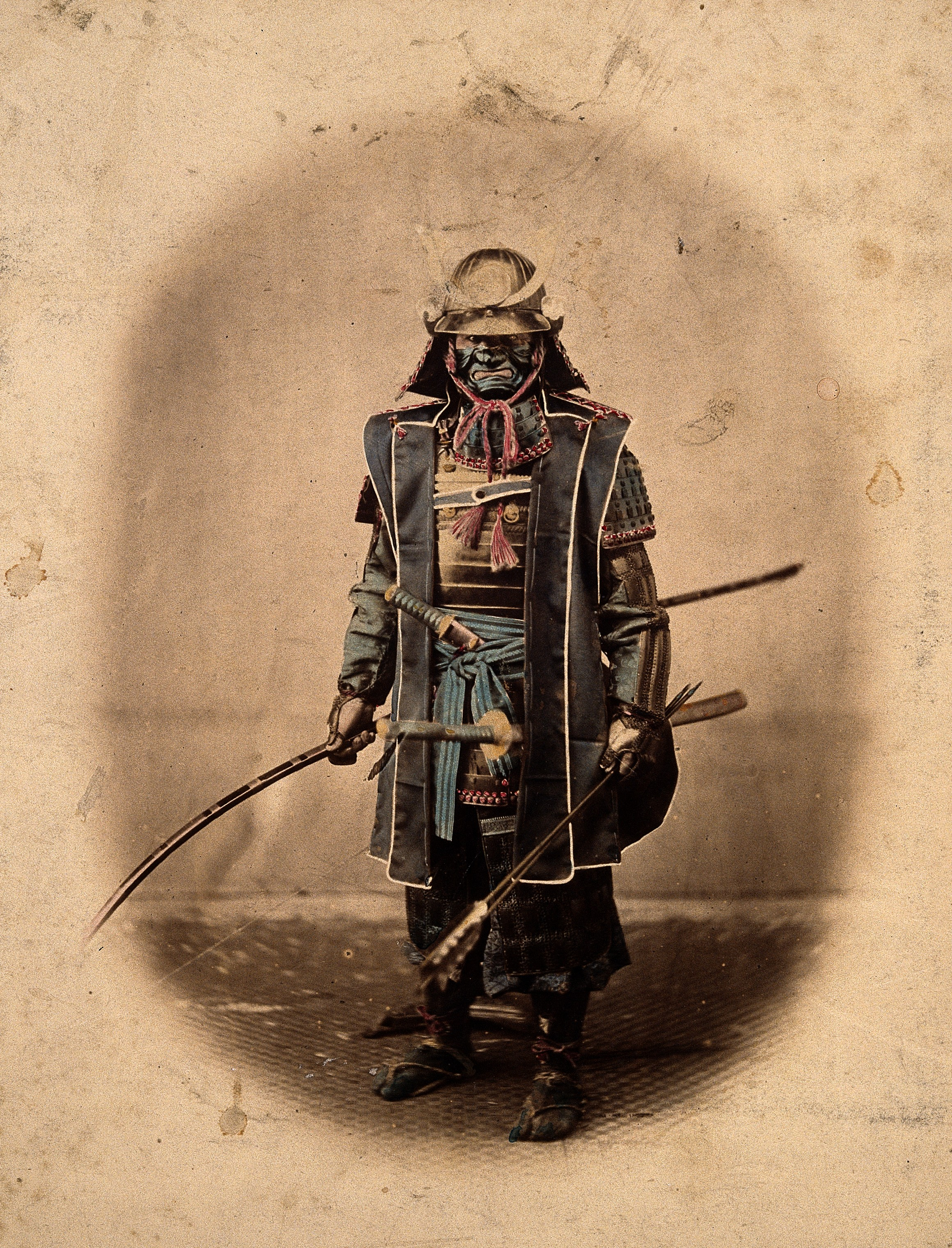
A samurai in his armor in the 1860s. Hand-colored photograph by Felice Beato

Bushidō (武士道; Japanese pronunciation: [bɯ.ɕiꜜ.doː]) is a samurai moral code concerning samurai attitudes, behavior, and lifestyle. Its origins date back to the Kamakura period, but the code was formalized in the Edo period (1603–1868). There are multiple types of bushido, which evolved significantly through history. Contemporary forms of bushido are still used in the social and economic organization of Japan. Bushido is also used as an overarching term for all the codes, practices, philosophies, and principles of samurai culture. It is loosely analogous to the European concept of chivalry, but with some major differences.

== Origin ==
The concept of a samurai code or codes was developed and refined centuries before the Edo period in the Kamakura period. Such ideas formalized earlier moral values and ethics, most commonly stressing a combination of sincerity, frugality, loyalty, martial arts mastery, honour until death, "bravery", and "loyalty to the samurai's lord." Bushido proper developed between the 16th and 20th centuries, but this was debated by pundits who believed they were building on a legacy dating back to the 10th century.

The term bushido itself is "rarely attested in pre-modern literature", but a code of honor did exist among the writing elite and historians who were generally disgusted enough at the dishonorable activity of some fighters such as shinobi as to rarely mention them. Ideas of honor that led to bushido developed in response to the longstanding dishonorable behavior of samurai, emerging stealth and espionage techniques, and Zen Buddhist soldier tenets.

The relative peace in Japan during the Kamakura period favored ideas of honor in battle, expressed in customs such as announcing one's family name and/or lineages before fighting, attempting to limit fights among warrior nobles to horseback archery or sword duels with no subterfuge or trickery, and conducting oneself like a legendary character or renowned hero (tales of daring were popular in the Kamakura period). Pre-bushido honor codes during this time were also contributed to by commoners, who sometimes took on similar roles to samurai and often used their family names as introductions to fighting despite not being noble. However, even during the relatively small family and land quarrels of this time, as well as duels thought to be honorable, warriors often disregarded these norms of combat and the announcement of family names or lineages was mostly a way to brag and assert a right to fight and/or gain whatever a faction was looking for after a fight. Outright bragging was also known to happen. These already tenuous codes of honor were weakened when the Japanese, expecting the invading Mongols to be laid-back with their combat, humiliatingly sent an envoy that fired a noisemaker arrow to officially commence the start of what the Japanese assumed would be a series of small duels and skirmishes. Additionally, Mongols usually cut swathes through soldiers that attempted to announce their lineages before facing them. Despite ultimately winning against the Mongols, these honor norms, along with the shogunate, were weakened enough to cause endemic division that led to the end of the Kamakura period and the court wars of the Nanboku-chō period.

Born from Neo-Confucianism during times of peace in the Edo period and following Confucian texts, while also being influenced by Shinto and Zen Buddhism, it balanced violence with the therapeutic ideals of wisdom and peace accepted at the time. It was developed further during the Muromachi period (1336–1573) and formally defined and applied in law by the Tokugawa shogunate in the Edo period. There is no strict definition, and interpretations of the code have varied over time. Bushido has undergone many changes throughout Japanese history, and various Japanese clans interpreted it in their own way until the 19th century, enough for it to be most often a series of unwritten oral expectations that could be described as different codes, with further variations likely existing in the same warrior noble house, rather than a single code.

One of the earliest known usages of bushido is in the extremely influential late 16th century text The Military Mirror of Kai, where it was used to describe unwritten rules in a complex metaphorical way that commoners could purportedly not live up to. Another early use of the written term is in the Kōyō Gunkan in 1616 by Kōsaka Masanobu. In 1685, the ukiyo-e book Kokon Bushidō ezukushi (古今武士道絵つくし, "Images of Bushidō Through the Ages") by artist Hishikawa Moronobu included the term and artwork of samurai with simple descriptions meant for children. In 1642, the Kashoki (可笑記, "Amusing Notes") was written by samurai Saito Chikamori and included moral precepts which explained the theoretical aspects of bushido. It was written with accessible kana and intended for commoners, not warriors. It was very popular, demonstrating that the idea of bushido had spread among the population. The Kashoki shows that moral values were present in bushido by 1642.

The term, bushido, came into common international usage with the 1899 publication of Nitobe Inazō's Bushido: The Soul of Japan, which was read by many influential Western people. In Bushido (1899), Nitobe wrote:

Bushidō, then, is the code of moral principles which the samurai were required or instructed to observe...More frequently it is a code unuttered and unwritten...It was an organic growth of decades and centuries of military career. In order to become a samurai, this code has to be mastered.

In Feudal and Modern Japan (1896), historian Arthur May Knapp wrote:

The samurai of thirty years ago had behind him a thousand years of training in the law of honor, obedience, duty, and self-sacrifice ... It was not needed to create or establish them. As a child, he had but to be instructed, as indeed he was from his earliest years, in the etiquette of self-immolation.

== Etymology ==
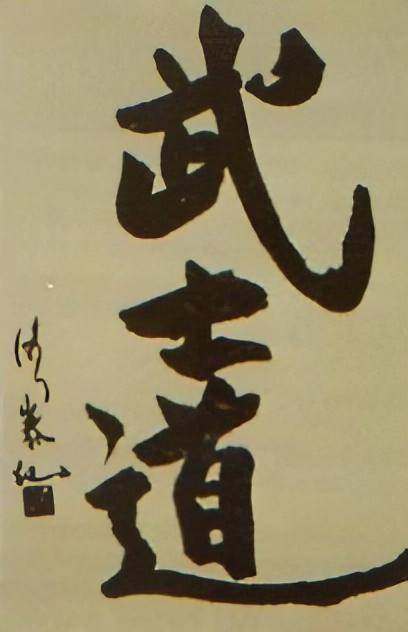
Bushidō – The Way of the Warrior. Written in Japanese kanji.

Bushidō (武士道) is a Japanese word that literally means 'warrior way'. It is first attested in the 1616 work Kōyō Gunkan (甲陽軍鑑), a military chronicle recording the exploits of the Takeda clan. The term is a compound of bushi (武士; 'warrior', literally 'military + man'), a Chinese-derived word first attested in Japanese in 712 with the on'yomi (Sino-Japanese reading), and dō (道; 'road, way'). In modern usage, bushi is often used as a synonym for samurai; however, historical sources make it clear that bushi and samurai were distinct concepts, with the former referring to soldiers or warriors and the latter referring instead to a kind of hereditary nobility.

In the early 17th century, the term bushidō (武士道) with its on'yomi reading was used alongside the synonymous alternative form (武士の道), read using native Japanese vocabulary (kun'yomi) as mono no fu no michi. Another important term is bushi katagi (武士気質; literally 'warrior temperament').

== Usage ==
For centuries, the samurai adhered to multiple types of the code, of which the interpretations varied per samurai clan and per member of the military nobility. This encompassed morality, their role in society, and how to live a life with honor and virtue. The samurai had some common values, but they did not have a single definition or path that all samurai were required to abide by. The samurai were as practical on the battlefield as any other warriors. These concepts, codes, and ideals were ingrained in the samurai since they rose to power in the Kamakura period (1185–1333). At certain eras, there were prevalent rules and unwritten customs such as the "Way of the Bow and the Horse" (弓馬の道, kyūba no michi) since the 12th century and, in the Edo period, the code of the samurai was formalized with specific virtues and laws by the ruling Tokugawa Shogunate. Notable samurai, such as Miyamoto Musashi (1584–1645) and Yamamoto Tsunetomo (1659–1719)., wrote extensively about their interpretations of bushido. In the 1870s, the Meiji restoration abolished the samurai class, and they were transferred to professional, military, and business classes. However, the former samurai and their descendants continued to be influential in Japanese society because they occupied important positions. Bushido has continued to exist in various forms. Additional concepts and ideas were added to bushido so that it could evolve with the times. It was used in the Armed Forces of the Empire of Japan and symbolically by the successor Japan Self-Defense Forces. In the Taisho period, bushido was advocated as the way of the merchant. It can be dormant for years and revived during geopolitical instability. Centuries of rule by the samurai class have left a deep impact on Japanese society. Thus, various forms are still used today in e.g., Japanese culture, business, martial arts, and communication.

=== Myth and reality ===
Bushido is often described as a specific moral code that all members of the samurai class were obligated to follow. However, historically, the samurai adhered to multiple warrior codes, and the interpretations varied per samurai clan, individuals, and eras. These codes and philosophies changed dramatically during the different eras. The earliest proto-bushido type existed since the Kamakura period (1185). The degrees of devotion and interpretations varied between individuals. Since at least the Sengoku period, samurai didn't have compunction to use certain weapons. Retreating from battles did occur if it was unwinnable while others chose to fight till the end. Samurai did not actively seek an honorable death. However, it was honorable to die in the service of a daimyo only while furthering the daimyo's cause.

Samurai had dark customs, the most notable: Kiri-sute gomen was the right to strike the lower class who dishonored them. Seppuku was ritual suicide, to die honorably or restore one's honor. Tsujigiri (crossroads killing) to attack a human opponent to test a weapon or skill became rampant in the early Edo period until a ban was issued. The exact frequency of tsujigiri is unknown, and it was never officially condoned by any samurai clan. However, it and other types of samurai-committed murder did happen enough to become a point of complaint among Europeans.

Samurai did head collection with a ritual to beautify severed heads of worthy rivals and put them on display. The samurai applied various cruel punishments on criminals. The most common capital punishments up until the Meiji Restoration were (in order of severity): decapitation, decapitation with disgraceful exposure of head post-death, crucifixion (e.g. parricide), and death by burning with incendiaries. Members of the samurai class had the privilege to perform hara-kiri (suicide disemboweling). If it was not lethal, then a friend or relation performed decapitation (kaishaku). In 1597, Toyotomi Hideyoshi ordered the prosecution of 26 Martyrs of Japan. They were tortured, mutilated, paraded through villages, and executed by crucifixion, tied to crosses on a hill, and impaled by lances (spears). In the 17th century, the Tokugawa Shogunate executed over 400 Christians (Martyrs of Japan) for being more loyal to their faith than the Shogunate. The capital punishments were beheading, crucifixion, death by burning and Ana-tsurushi (穴吊るし; lit. "hole hanging").

Bushido has been described as Japanese chivalry, and samurai in general have been described as being like Western knights. Notable similarities and differences depend on which bushido type is compared with chivalry. Christianity had a modifying influence on the virtues of chivalry, whereas bushido was influenced by Zen Buddhism, Shinto, and Confucianism. Bushido is commonly associated with the moral norms of Nitobe Inazō's Bushido: The Soul of Japan (1900), because his book popularized the term bushido internationally. However, it is a romanticized interpretation of bushido that differs from other historical literature by the samurai. Thus, the morals defined by Nitobe do not represent all of bushido. Some researchers claim that chivalric bushido, as defined by Nitobe (a.k.a. Meiji Bushido), was invented in the 19th century. However, there is a plethora of historical literature about Japanese warrior codes, practices, philosophies since the Kamakura period. These types can be categorized by era into Sengoku, Edo, Meiji and Contemporary Bushido. Therefore the term bushido can be used as an overarching term for all the codes, practices, philosophies and principles of samurai culture.

Chinese politician Dai Jitao acknowledged the historical legitimacy of bushido and said it originated as a theory of a social order, but it had evolved considerably. In the Tokugawa period, bushido was used to describe an ethical theory, and it became a religious concept based on Shinto. In the Meiji period, bushido absorbed European ideals and formed the foundation of Japan's political ethics. Chinese writer Zhou Zuoren supported the historical legitimacy, although it was thought to be altered and corrupted in the modern period.

== Historical development ==
The values that became bushido evolved significantly over the centuries to the present. These first appeared as unwritten customs in the 12th century with shogun Minamoto Yoritomo. The written term bushido first appears in the Koyo Gunkan of roughly circa 1616, an account of the military exploits of the Takeda clan. Bushido evolved from being totally devoted to valor in battle into refined types that were more related to moral integrity. The samurai had different types of bushido in each era in history, reflecting changing requirements on the battlefield and in society. The era name should be used to describe the type of bushido.

=== Heian period ===
The first predecessor to bushido was the class morality system of the Heian period.

=== Kamakura period ===
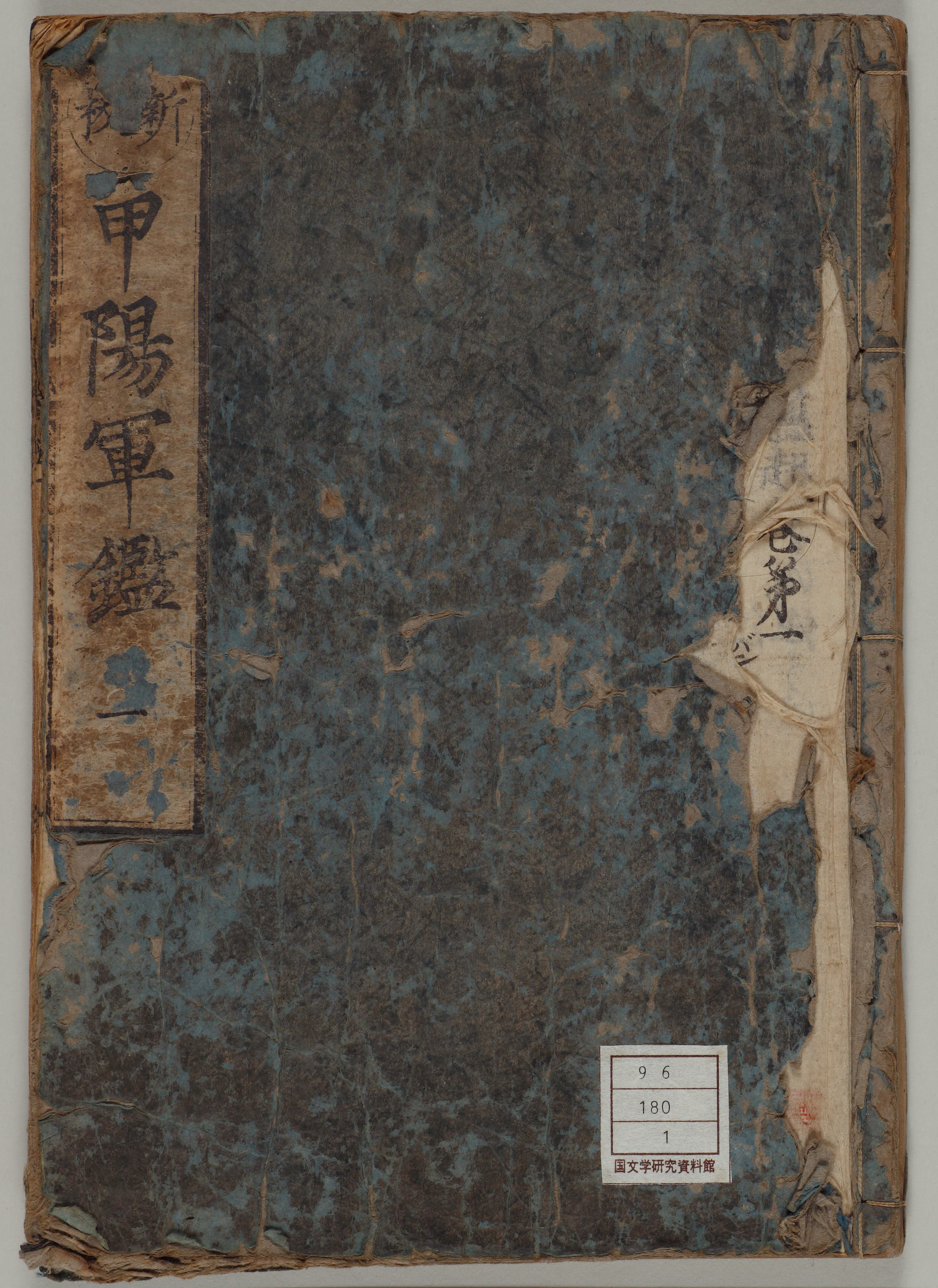
Koyo Gunkan by Kosaka Masanobu (1616)

The first proper Japanese central government was established around the year 700. Japan was ruled by the Emperor (Tennō) with bureaucratic support of the aristocracy. They gradually lost control of their armed servants, the samurai. By the mid-12th century, the samurai class had seized control. The samurai (bushi) ruled Japan with the shogun (将軍) as the overlord until the mid-19th century. The shogun was originally the Emperor's military deputy. After the Genpei War (1180–1185), Minamoto no Yoritomo usurped power from the civil aristocracy by establishing a military government called the bakufu situated in Kamakura since 1192. The Emperor and his court became figureheads.

Shogun Minamoto no Yoritomo (1147–1199)

The appearance of bushido is linked to that of feudal Japan and the first shogun at the time of Minamoto no Yoritomo (1147–1199) in the 12th century. The own moral dimension of bushido gradually appears in the warrior culture and is landmarked in stories and military treaties only from the 14th and 15th centuries. Thus is noted a permanence of the modern representation of its antiquity in Japanese culture and its diffusion is noted.

In the 10th and 11th centuries, there was the Way of the Man-At-Arms (Tsuwamon no michi), and the Way of the Bow and Arrows (Kyûsen / kyûya no Michi). At the time of the Genpei War (1180–1185), it was called "Way of the Bow and the Horse" (弓馬の道, kyūba no michi) because of the major importance of this style of combat for the warriors of the time, and because it was considered a traditional method, that of the oldest samurai heroes, such as Prince Shōtoku, Minamoto no Yorimitsu and Minamoto no Yoshiie (Hachimantarō). According to Louis Frédéric, the kyūba no michi appeared around the 10th century as a set of rules and unwritten customs that samurai were expected to comply with. There was also "Yumiya toru mi no narai" (customs for those who draw the bow). This shows there was an emerging sense of ideal warrior behavior that evolved from daily training and warfare experience.

Towards the 10th and 11th centuries, we began to use expressions such as the way of the man-at-arms (Tsuwamon no michi), the way of the bow and arrows (Kyûsen / kyûya no Michi), the way of the bow and the horse (Kyûba no Michi). These expressions refer to practices which are the ancestors of the way of the warrior (bushidô), but they did not then imply any relation whatsoever to a morality. These were only practices focused on training for real combat, and which therefore had to do with the samurai way of life in the broad sense.

The world of warriors which developed [...] in the medieval period (12th–16th century) was [...] placed under the domination of the Buddhist religion [...]. Buddhism makes the prohibition of killing living beings one of its main principles. [...] Faced with death, some samurai thought they had inherited bad karma [...] others knew they were doing evil. The Buddhist notion of impermanence (Mujo) tended to express a certain meaning to the fragility of existence, [...]. Beliefs in the pure land of Buddha Amida [...] allowed some warriors to hope for an Amidist paradise [...]. Zen Buddhism, with its doctrine of the oneness between life and death, was also appreciated by many samurai [...]. The world of medieval warriors remained a universe still largely dominated by the supernatural, and the belief, in particular, in the tormented souls of warriors fallen in combat, who returned almost obsessively in the dreams of the living. This idea also ensured the success of the Noh theater.

The Tale of the Heike depicts an idealized story of the Genpei War (1180–1185) with a struggle between two powerful samurai clans, the Minamoto and the Taira. Clearly depicted throughout the epic is the ideal of the cultivated warrior. During the early modern era, these ideals were vigorously pursued in the upper echelons of warrior society and recommended as the proper form of the Japanese man of arms. The influence of Shinto, Buddhism, Taoism, and Confucianism on bushido's early development instilled among those who live by the code a religious respect for it.

Many early literary works of Japan talk of warriors, but the term bushidō does not appear in text until the Edo period. The code which would become bushido was conceptualized during the late-Kamakura period (1185–1333) in Japan. Since the days of the Kamakura shogunate, the "way of the warrior" has been an integral part of Japanese culture. Scholars generally regard pre-modern Japan as a "warrior nation" since the medieval period. The samurai were role models for society since medieval times. In accordance with Confucianism, one of their duties was to serve as a role model for society. They balanced their martial arts skills with peaceful accomplishments such as literature, poetry, and the tea ceremony. Such as the medieval Japanese proverb Hana wa sakuragi, hito wa bushi (Japanese: 花は桜木人は武士, literally "the [best] blossom is the cherry blossom; the [best] man is the warrior"). In 1843 Nakamura said:

Our nation is a nation of arms. The land to the west [China] is a nation of letters. Nations of letters value the pen. Nations of arms value the sword. That's the way it has been from the beginning... Our country and theirs are separated from one another by hundreds of miles, our customs are completely different, the temperaments of our people are dissimilar – so how could we possibly share the same Way?

— Nakamura 1843, cited in Watanabe 2012: 285.

=== Muromachi-Azuchi (1336–1603) ===
During the Muromachi period (1336–1573), the way of the warrior began to refine by inserting in their daily activities, alongside martial training, Zen meditation, painting (monochrome style), ikebana, the tea ceremony, poetry such as the death poem (written by samurai before suicidal missions or battles) and literature.

Carl Steenstrup noted that 13th- and 14th-century writings (gunki monogatari) "portrayed the bushi in their natural element, war, eulogizing such virtues as reckless bravery, fierce family pride, and selfless, at times senseless devotion of master and man".

Every farmer was basically also a warrior until Hideyoshi confiscated weapons through a nation-wide "sword-hunt" in 1588. Every ashigaru had his first lessons on the mentality of war from the biwa hōshi. On the other hand, the Heike recitations also propagated civic virtues: loyalty, steadfastness in adversity, and pride of family honor.

— Carl Steenstrup

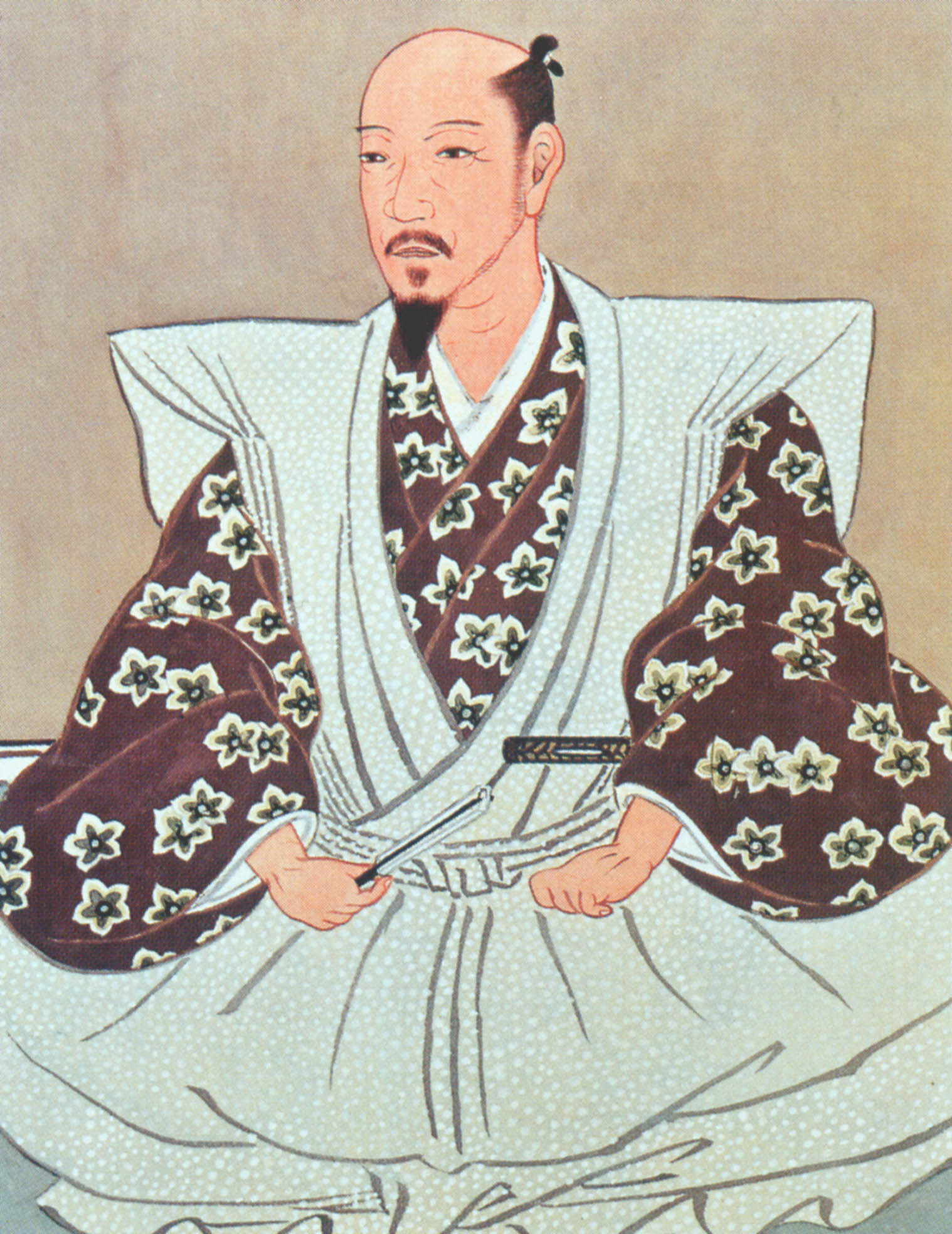
Daimyo Katō Kiyomasa

The sayings of Sengoku-period retainers and warlords such as Katō Kiyomasa (1562–1611) and Nabeshima Naoshige were generally recorded or passed down to posterity around the turn of the 16th century, when Japan had entered a period of relative peace. In a handbook addressed to "all samurai, regardless of rank", Katō states:

If a man does not investigate into the matter of bushidō daily, it will be difficult for him to die a brave and manly death. Thus, it is essential to engrave this business of the warrior into one's mind well.

— Katō Kiyomasa"

Katō was a ferocious warrior who banned even the recitation of poetry, stating:

One should put forth great effort in matters of learning. One should read books concerning military matters, and direct his attention exclusively to the virtues of loyalty and filial piety....Having been born into the house of a warrior, one's intentions should be to grasp the long and the short swords and to die."

— Katō Kiyomasa

Nabeshima Naoshige (1538–1618) says similarly, that it is shameful for any man to die without having risked his life in battle, regardless of rank, and that "bushidō is in being crazy to die. Fifty or more could not kill one such a man". However, Naoshige also suggests that "everyone should personally know exertion as it is known in the lower classes". By the mid-16th century, several of Japan's most powerful warlords began to vie for supremacy over territories amidst the Kyoto government's waning power. With Kyoto's capture by the warlord Oda Nobunaga in 1573, the Muromachi period concluded. In 1551 CE, one of the first Western people to visit Japan was the Roman Catholic missionary Francis Xavier. The description of Francis shows that honor, weaponry, and warfare were valued as of utmost importance in Japanese culture.

The Japanese are very ambitious of honors and distinctions, and think themselves superior to all nations in military glory and valor. They prize and honor all that has to do with war, and all such things, and there is nothing of which they are so proud as of weapons adorned with gold and silver. They always wear swords and daggers both in and out of the house, and when they go to sleep, they hang them at the head of the bed. In short, they value arms more than any people I have ever seen. They are excellent archers and usually fight on foot, though there is no lack of horses in the country. They are very polite to each other, but not to foreigners, whom they utterly despise. They spend their means on arms, bodily adornment, and on several attendants, and do not in the least care to save money. They are, in short, a very warlike people, and engaged in continual wars among themselves; the most powerful in arms bearing the most extensive sway. They have all one sovereign, although for one hundred and fifty years past the princes have ceased to obey him, and this is the cause of their perpetual feuds.

The practice of decapitating and collecting enemy heads is an example of honor in samurai culture. The severed heads were shown to a general as evidence that they killed wanted opponents and to collect rewards. More heads meant higher prestige, honor, and rewards. A beautification ritual of the severed heads called Ohaguro was performed. Prestigious heads were arranged on a table and presented in front of the warriors. All heads were identified and marked to prevent mistakes. The guards were left and right of the general and cited spells to transfix demonic spirits of the enemy. Then a samurai said his own name, lifted a box to show and describe the severed head. The general inspected the trophy heads while holding a fan so that the dead could not recognize his face. If the claimed head was correct, then the samurai received a payment; otherwise, he was dismissed.

Despite the war-torn culmination of this era and the birth of the Edo period, Samurai codes of conduct continued to extend beyond the realms of warfare. Forms of bushido-related Zen Buddhism and Confucianism also emerged during this period. A Samurai adhering to bushido-like codes was expected to live a just and ethical social life, honoring the practices of the gentry in the absence of military campaigns.

=== Edo (1603–1868) ===
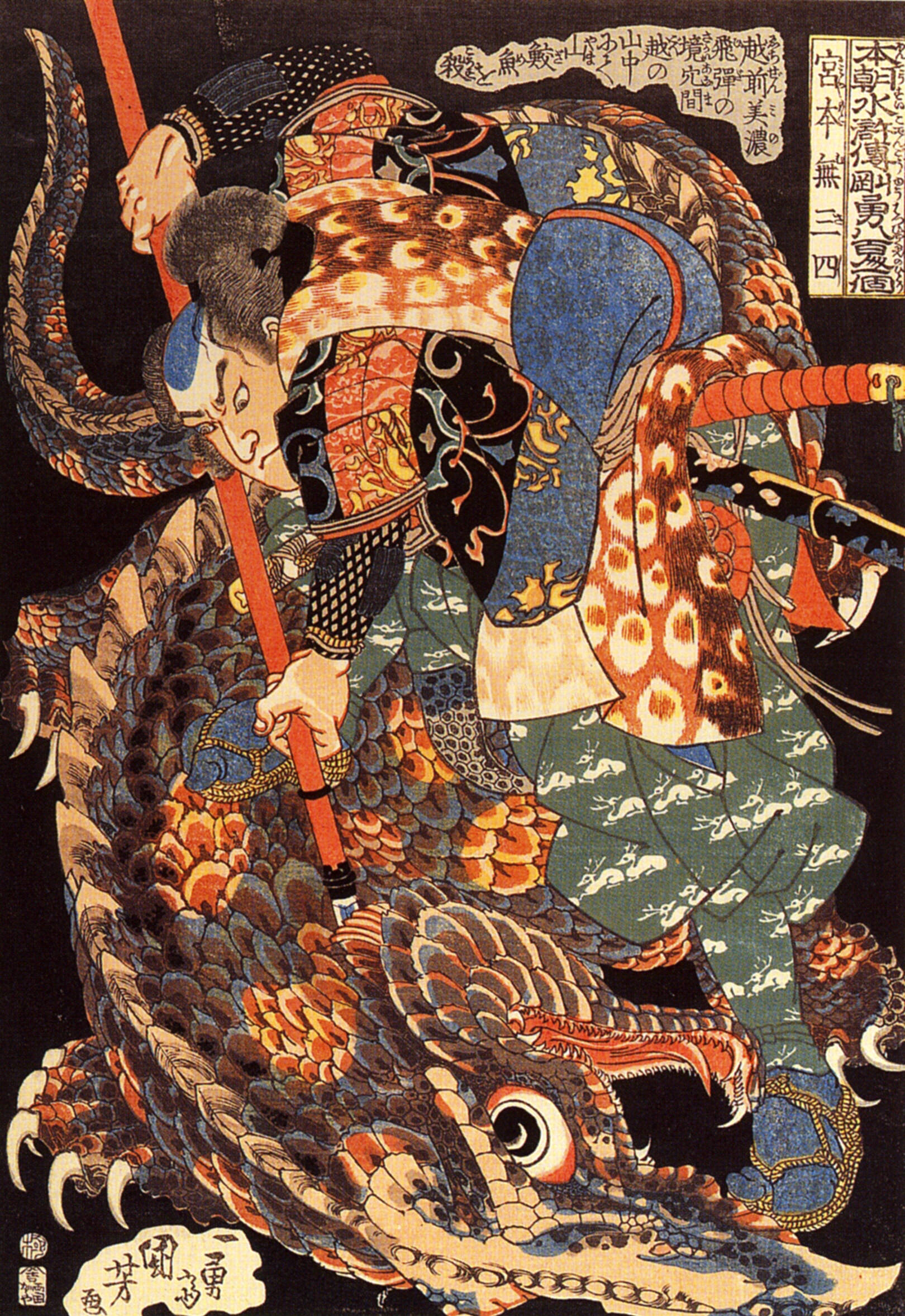
Miyamoto Musashi killing a giant creature, from The Book of Five Rings

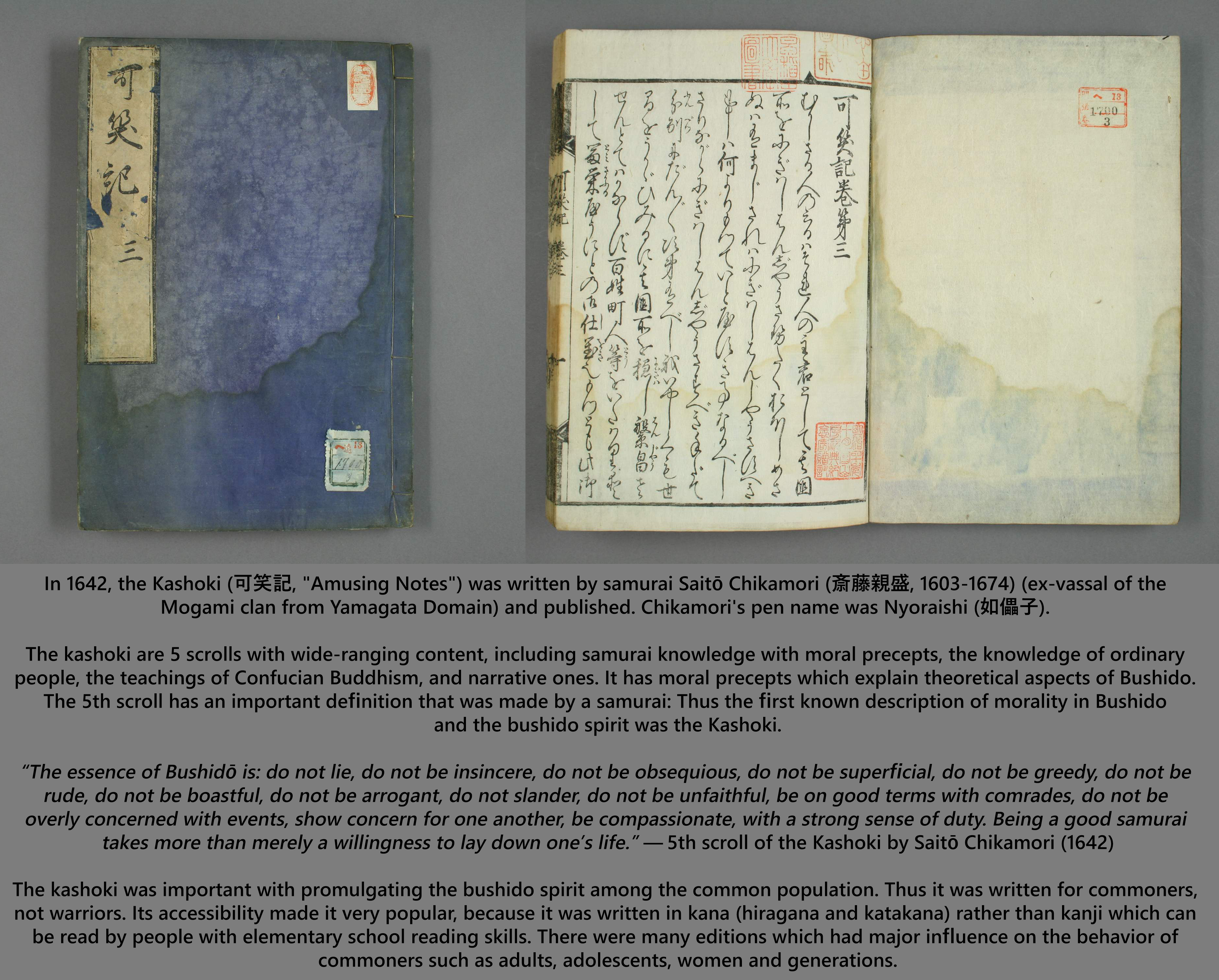
Kashoki (Amusing Notes) by Saito Chikamori (1642)

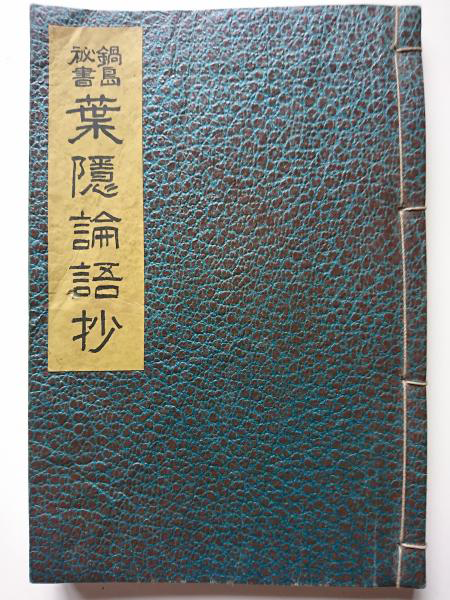
Nabeshima Secretary, Hagakure The Anelects

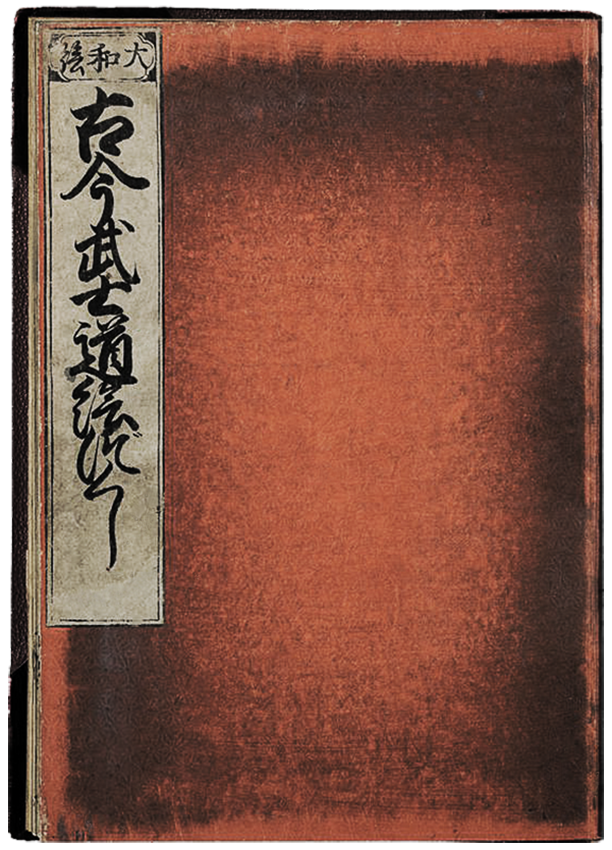
Book cover of Kokon Bushido Ezukushi (Bushido Through the Ages) by artist Hishikawa Moronobu (1685)

Japan enjoyed two and a half centuries of relative peace during the Edo period (1600 to the mid-19th century). Japan didn't have domestic or international conflict. These peaceful times in Tokugawa society enabled bushido to be refined from a focus on valor in battle to more moral integrity.

The Tokugawa shogunate (1603–1867) codified aspects of the Samurai warrior values and formalized them into parts of the Japanese feudal law. In addition to the "house codes" issued in the context of the fiefdoms (han) and texts that described the right behavior of a warrior (such as the Hagakure), the first Buke shohatto (Laws for the Military Houses, 武家諸法度) was issued by the government in 1615, which prescribed to the lords of the fiefdoms (daimyo) and the samurai warrior aristocracy responsibilities and activities, the rules of conduct, simple and decent clothing, the correct supply in case of official visits, etc. The edicts were reissued in 1629, and in 1635, by the third shogun Tokugawa Iemitsu. The new edicts made clear the shogunate's authority and its desire to assert control. The swordsmanship skills of the samurai developed into character-building martial arts.

During this period, the samurai class played a central role in the policing and administration of the country. The bushidō literature of this time contains much thought relevant to a warrior class seeking more general application of martial principles and experience in peacetime, as well as reflection on the land's long history of war. The literature of this time includes:

- Shoke no Hyōjō by Ogasawara Sakuun (1621)
- Budo Shōshinshu (武道初心集) by Taira Shigesuke, Daidōji Yūzan (1639–1730)
- Hagakure as related by Yamamoto Tsunetomo to Tsuramoto Tashiro.
- Bugei Juhappan (武芸十八般)
- A Book of Five Rings by Miyamoto Musashi

The first mention of the term bushido is in the scriptures Koyo Gunkan (甲陽軍鑑) from Takeda-ryū (martial arts school), written around 1616 by samurai Kōsaka Masanobu (1527–1578). It consists of 20 scrolls that mention bushido over 30 times. It contains the history of the Takeda family and their military tactics. The Koyo Gunkan describes valor and exploits in battle. For example, it is a waste of talent when a bushido practitioner takes on administrative roles in government or financial affairs (e.g., dealings in rice, money, timber, or forest land). It emphasizes that bushido lies only in "becoming as a spear" on the battlefield. The scrolls were widely disseminated as a martial arts instruction manual by the samurai class and helped to popularize the term.

In Koyo Gunkan (1616), bushido is a survival technique for individual fighters, and it aims to make the development of the self and the clan troupe advantageous by raising the samurai name. He also affirms that he seeks a lord who praises himself for wandering, as reflected in Tōdō Takatora (1556–1630)'s deceased memoir that "A samurai cannot be called a samurai until he has changed his lords seven times." Also, as symbolized by Asakura Norikage (1477–1555), "The warrior may be called a beast or a dog; the main thing is winning." As symbolized by Asakura Norikage, it is essential to win the battle even with the slander of cowardice. The feature is that it also contains the cold-hearted philosophy. These are mainly related to the way of life as a samurai, and they are the teachings of each family, and they are also equivalent to the treatment of vassals.

Dr. Hiroko Willcock (senior lecturer at Griffith University, Australia) explained Koyo Gunkan is the earliest comprehensive extant work that provides a notion of bushido as a samurai ethos and the value system of the samurai tradition. However, it does not have a set of principles regarded as "true" or "false", but rather varying perceptions widely regarded as formidable throughout different centuries. Emphasized by Thomas Cleary,

Confucianism, Buddhism, and Shinto were each represented by a variety of schools, and elements of all three were commonly combined in Japanese culture and customs. As the embodiment of Samurai culture, bushido is correspondingly diverse, drawing selectively on elements of all these traditions to articulate the ethos and discipline of the warrior.

During the Genna era (1615–1624) of the Edo period and later, the concept of "the way of the gentleman" (Shidō) was newly established by the philosopher and strategist Yamaga Sokō (1622–1685) and others who tried to explain this value in the morality of the Confucian Cheng–Zhu school. For the first time, Confucian ethics (such as Honor and Humanity", "filial piety") became the norm required by samurai. Yamaga Sokō was widely viewed as the "Sage of Bushidō" in early twentieth-century Japan.

Martial arts scholar Ogasawara Sakuun compiled 20 scrolls called Shoke no Hyōjō about the military arts in 1621. Therein, bushido is described as iji (willpower). The scrolls describe the essence of bushido as the strength to not yield to rewards or power, but adhere to personal convictions that dominate one's inner principles.

In 1642, the Kashoki (可笑記, "Amusing Notes") was written by samurai Saitō Chikamori (斎藤親盛, 1603–1674) (ex-vassal of the Mogami clan from Yamagata Domain) and published. Chikamori's pen name was Nyoraishi (如儡子). The kashoki are 5 scrolls with wide-ranging content, including samurai knowledge with moral precepts, the knowledge of ordinary people, the teachings of Confucian Buddhism, and narrative ones. It has moral precepts that explain the theoretical aspects of bushido. The 5th scroll has an important definition that was made by a samurai: Thus, the first known description of morality in bushido and the bushido spirit was the Kashoki.

The essence of Bushidō is: do not lie, do not be insincere, do not be obsequious, do not be superficial, do not be greedy, do not be rude, do not be boastful, do not be arrogant, do not slander, do not be unfaithful, be on good terms with comrades, do not be overly concerned with events, show concern for one another, be compassionate, with a strong sense of duty. Being a good samurai takes more than merely a willingness to lay down one's life.

— 5th scroll of the Kashoki by Saitō Chikamori (1642)

The kashoki was important in promulgating the bushido spirit among the common population. Thus, it was written for commoners, not warriors. Its accessibility made it very popular, because it was written in kana (hiragana and katakana) rather than kanji which can be read by people with elementary school reading skills. There were many editions which had major influence on the behavior of commoners such as adults, adolescents, women and generations.

Master swordsman Miyamoto Musashi's life exemplifies bushido. Musashi (1584–1645) wrote The Book of Five Rings (Gorin no Sho) around 1643. It consists of five volumes (Earth, Water, Fire, Wind, and Void). The Book of Earth describes the general framework of bushidō. For example: apply skills in any situation, always carry two swords, learn how to effectively use the lance, naginata, bow and arrow, and guns. A daimyo should know the strength of his troops and how to properly deploy them. Devote yourself to training to master a way, avoid evil acts and thoughts, broaden perspectives with arts and knowledge about different professions, make objective judgments, etc.

In 1685, the ukiyo-e book Kokon Bushidō ezukushi (古今武士道絵つくし, "Images of Bushidō Through the Ages") by artist Hishikawa Moronobu (1618–1694) was published. It features heroic popular tales of samurai warriors with simple descriptions per artwork. The title includes the word bushido, and it was meant for children, which shows that it had spread among the general population.

The Chinese politician Dai Jitao (1891–1949) attended Nihon University's law program in 1907. He was fluent in Japanese and learned about bushido. Dai criticized the supposedly violent nature of the traditional Japanese feudal class structure before the Meiji period. Dai said the samurai brutally exploited the class structure to abuse and kill people below them in the social order (and biasedly claimed the opposite for Chinese society as peace-loving). According to Dai, after Confucianism became influential in the 17th century, it brought ideas of benevolence and humanity that pacified the cruel samurai and set Japan upon the course to become a modern and civilized society. Dai also appreciated aspects of the samurai. For example, Dai said: Japan continued to benefit from its spirit of self-sacrifice, selfless loyalty, and—after Confucianism was introduced—compassion. Dai blamed the problems of modern Japan (post-Meiji restoration) on the loss of samurai virtues when the former merchant class gained power, and large corporations started to steer government policy. Dai said after the samurai class was heavily influenced by Confucian ideals of compassion, their bushido became a "life of blood and tears essentially", because they selflessly shed blood for their lords and cried tears of compassion for farmers and other lower-class people.

The Hagakure contains many sayings attributed to Sengoku-period retainer Nabeshima Naoshige (1537–1619) regarding bushidō related philosophy early in the 18th century by Yamamoto Tsunetomo (1659–1719), a former retainer to Naoshige's grandson, Nabeshima Mitsushige. The Hagakure was compiled in the early 18th century, but was kept as a kind of "secret teaching" of the Nabeshima clan until the end of the Tokugawa bakufu (1867). His saying, "I have found the way of the warrior is death", was a summation of the focus on honour and reputation over all else that bushidō codified. This is occasionally misinterpreted that bushido is a code of death. The true meaning is that by having a constant consciousness of death, people can achieve a state of freedom that transcends life and death, whereby "it is possible to perfectly fulfill one's calling as a warrior."

Tokugawa-era rōnin, scholar and strategist Yamaga Sokō (1622–1685) wrote extensively on matters relating to bushidō, bukyō (a "warrior's creed"), and a more general shidō, a "way of gentlemen" intended for application to all stations of society. Sokō attempts to codify a kind of "universal bushidō" with a special emphasis on "pure" Confucian values (rejecting the mystical influences of Tao and Buddhism in Neo-Confucian orthodoxy), while at the same time calling for recognition of the singular and divine nature of Japan and Japanese culture. These radical concepts—including ultimate devotion to the Emperor, regardless of rank or clan—put him at odds with the reigning shogunate. He was exiled to the Akō domain (the future setting of the 47 Rōnin incident), and his works were not widely read until the rise of nationalism in the early 20th century.

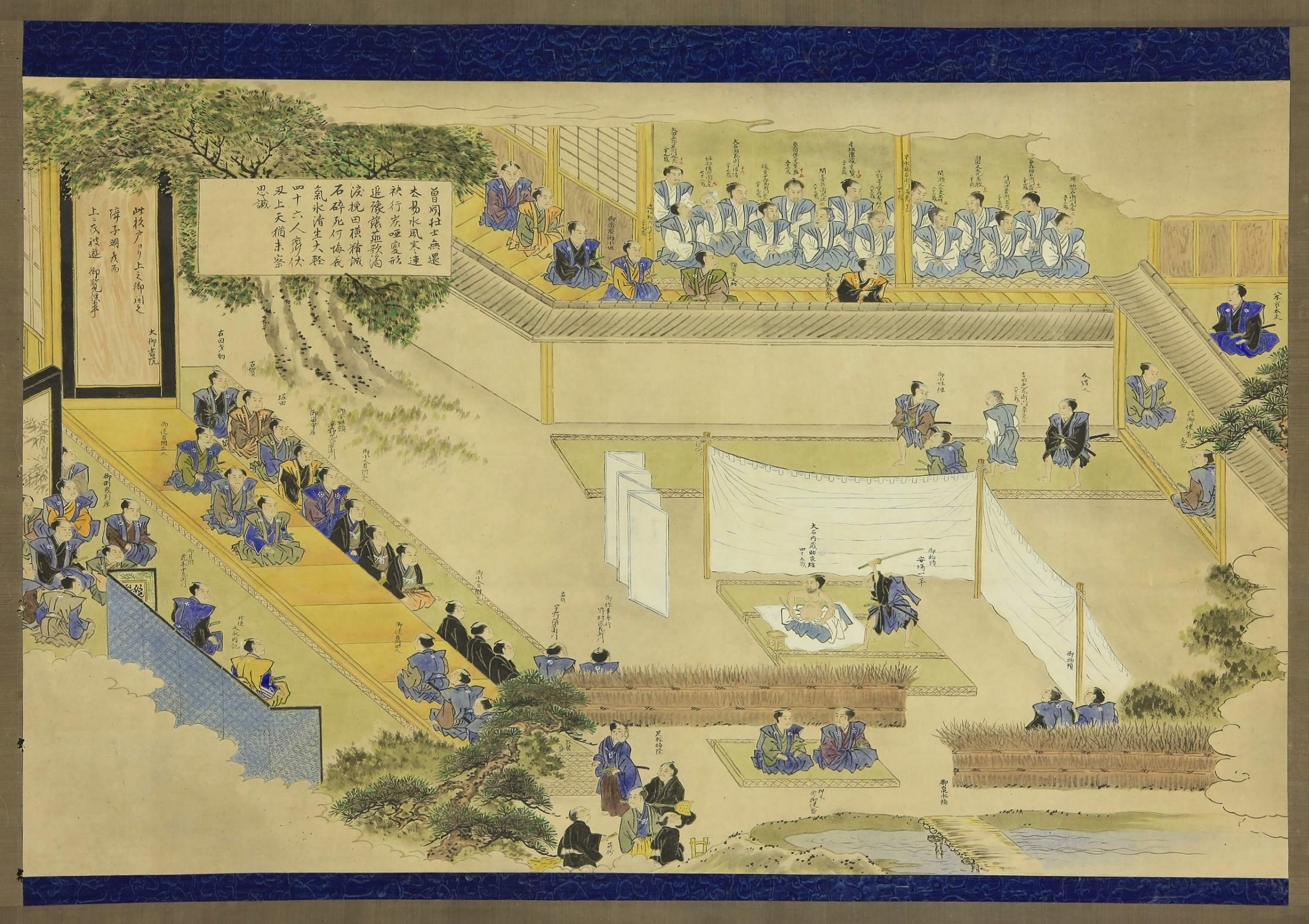
Painting of Ōishi Yoshio committing seppuku, 1703

The aging Yamamoto Tsunetomo's interpretation of bushidō is perhaps more illustrative of the philosophy refined by his unique station and experience, at once dutiful and defiant, ultimately incompatible with the laws of an emerging civil society. Of the 47 rōnin—to this day, generally regarded as exemplars of bushidō—Tsunetomo felt they were remiss in hatching such a wily, delayed plot for revenge, and had been over-concerned with the success of their undertaking. Instead, Tsunetomo felt true samurai should act without hesitation to fulfill their duties, without regard for success or failure.

This romantic sentiment is, of course, expressed by warriors throughout history, though it may run counter to the art of war itself. This ambivalence is found in the heart of bushidō, and perhaps all such "warrior codes". Some combination of traditional bushidō's organic contradictions and more "universal" or "progressive" formulations (like those of Yamaga Sokō) would inform Japan's disastrous military ambitions in the 20th century.

According to the social psychologist Toshio Yamagishi (ja:山岸俊男, 1948–2018), "Bushido is the ideal human image formed mainly in the Edo period, in other words, a virtue in the groupism world." It was the perfect person who fitted the ideal control of the samurai administration in the Edo period.

=== Meiji (1868–1926) ===
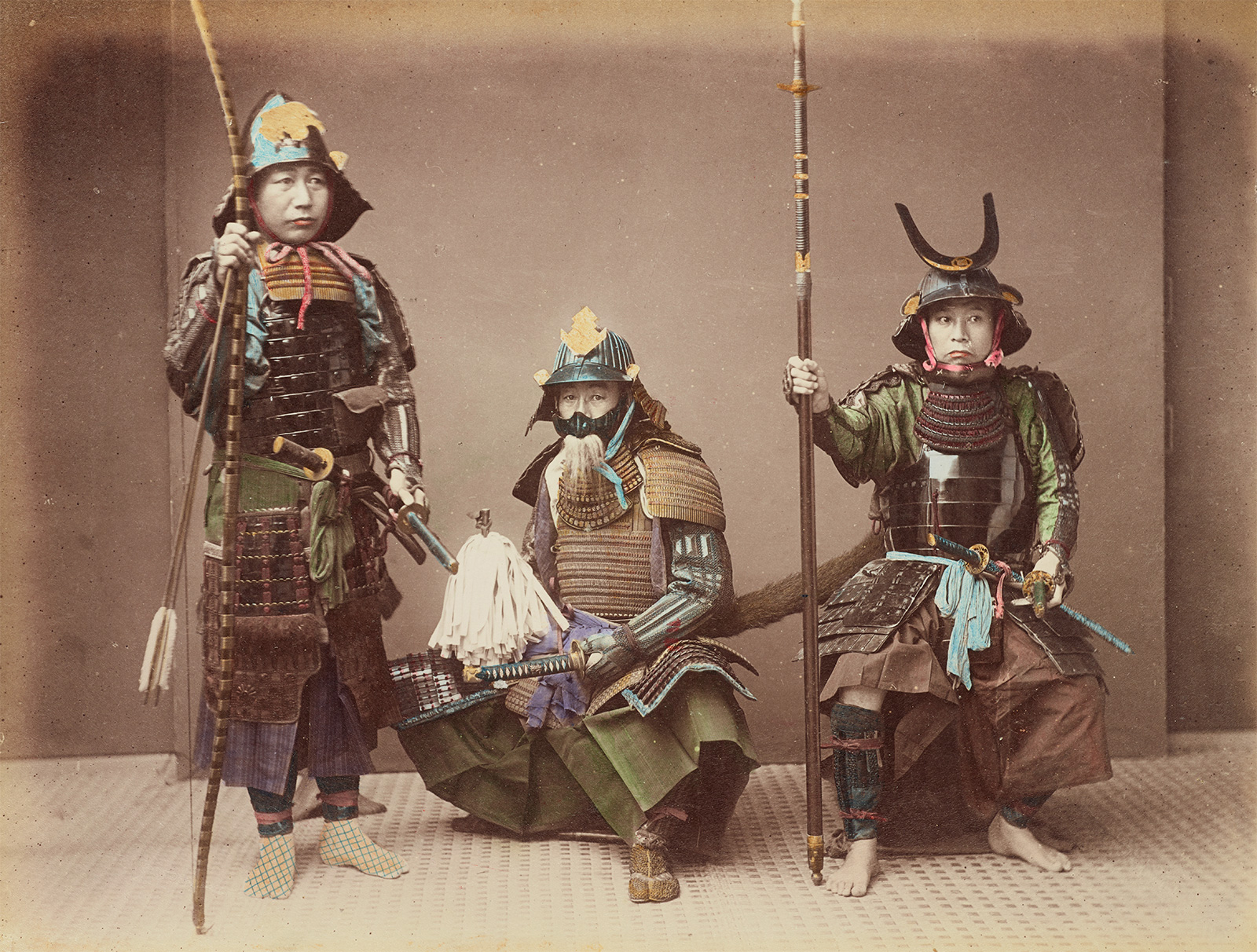
Three samurai with different weapons, the one on the left has a yumi, in the center a katana and on the right a yari

Recent scholarship in both Japan and abroad has focused on differences between the samurai caste and the bushido theories that developed in modern Japan. Bushido evolved considerably over time. Bushido in the prewar period emphasized the role of the emperor and placed greater value on the imperial virtues of loyalty and self-sacrifice than many Tokugawa-era interpretations.

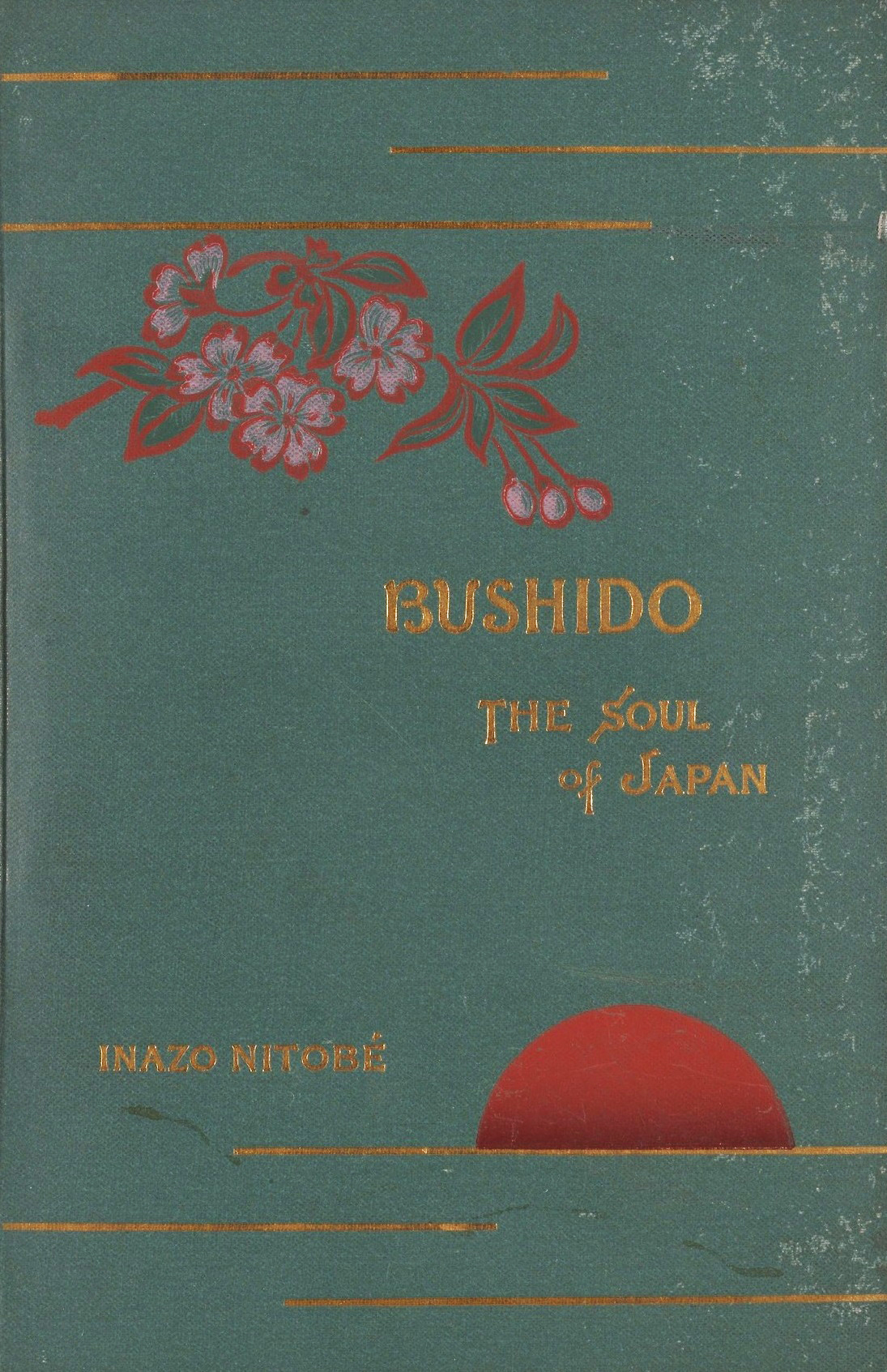
Cover of Bushido: The Soul of Japan, 1900

Prominent scholars consider the bushido prevalent since the Meiji era to be a simplification of the attributes of samurai. Samurai originally fought for personal matters and the honor of their family and clan. When Japan was unified, the role of samurai included public administrative responsibilities, such as public order preservation, judicial responsibility, infrastructure maintenance, disaster recovery, farmland development, healthcare administration, and industrial promotion.

The samurai class was abolished in the 1870s, and the role of those in it grew more bureaucratic, focusing on the formation of a modern nation-state. With the diminishing of social classes, some values were transferred to the whole population, such as loyalty to the emperor. The author Yukio Mishima asserted that "invasionism or militarism had nothing to do with bushidō from the outset." According to Mishima, a man of bushido is someone who has a firm sense of self-respect, takes responsibility for his actions, and sacrifices himself to embody that responsibility.

Dai Jitao credited the samurai with sole responsibility for the Meiji Restoration, which enabled Japan's modernization, while the populace merely allowed it to happen. Dai argued that Japanese combative tendency and militarism were purely founded in Japan's socio-religious superstitions centered on the notion of divine authority. It did not exist in Chinese or Indian thought.

Bushido was used as a propaganda tool by the government and military, who doctored it to suit their needs. The original Imperial Rescript to Soldiers and Sailors of 1882 uses the word hōkoku (報国), signifying the idea of indebtedness to one's nation because of one's birth. Such debt must be repaid through physical or mental exertion. This idea did not exist in earlier bushido.

Chinese writer Zhou Zuoren regarded the bushido promoted by the military as a corruption of a noble and ancient tradition. He discussed the act of seppuku and the importance of old samurai practices in his 1935 essay series, "Riben guankui". He named the story of the Forty-seven rōnin of the Akō Domain, who were sentenced to seppuku after avenging their daimyo, and their legacy in the story Chūshingura (A Treasury of Loyal Retainers). He discussed the Sakai incident, in which 20 samurai from the Tosa Domain committed seppuku in 1868 for attacking French sailors. These examples were compared with the soft punishment given to the soldiers who assassinated Prime Minister Inukai Tsuyoshi in 1932. Zhou condemned them for not taking responsibility by committing suicide like traditional samurai. In 1936, Zhou wrote about the loss of humanity and empathy of traditional bushido during the deterioration of the Second World War. He pointed to the samurai novel by Jun'ichirō Tanizaki as an example where victors of a battle treated enemy corpses with dignity.

Bushido regained popularity and became intertwined with Japan's nationalist expression in the mid-1800s in response to Britain's invasion of China in the First Opium War. Xenophobia toward Westerners rose in Japan during the 1850s and 1860s which contributed to the perceived legitimacy of the imperial restoration. Use of "bushido" in text increased during this period, and its concept was viewed with more positivity. While it disappeared during the 1870s, it reappeared in the 1880s to express the loss of traditional values during the rapid introduction of Western civilization and a renewed sense of urgency to defend Japanese traditions. The victory of Japan over China in 1895 restored a feeling of pride in bushido, which was considered the "origin of military success."

The researcher Oleg Benesch argued that the concept of modern bushido changed throughout the modern era as a response to foreign stimuli in the 1880s, such as the English concept of the gentleman. Nitobe Inazō's bushido interpretations followed a similar trajectory, though he was following earlier trends. This relatively pacifistic bushido was hijacked and adapted by militarists and the government from the early 1900s as nationalism increased around the time of the Russo–Japanese War.

The entrepreneur Fukuzawa Yukichi appreciated bushido and emphasized that maintaining the morale of scholars is the essence of eternal life. Nitoto Inazuke submitted his book, Bushido, to Emperor Meiji and stated, "Bushido is prosperous here, assists Komo, and promotes the national style, so that the public will return to the patriotic virtues of loyal ministers." He wrote that bushido has slightly different requirements for men and women. For women, bushido means guarding their chastity, educating their children, supporting their husbands, and maintaining their families.

The junshi suicide of General Nogi Maresuke and his wife on the death of Emperor Meiji earned praise as an example of opposition to the trend of decaying morals in Japan. It also earned criticism from those who believed that aspect of bushido should not be revived.

After the Meiji Restoration, the martial arts etiquette represented by Ogasawara-ryū (小笠原流) popularized training. Bushido-influenced martial arts and education corresponded with nationalistic ideals prevalent before 1941. Honoring tradition through bushido-inspired martial skills enabled society to remain interconnected, harnessing society's reverence for ancestral practices for national strength. According to researcher William R. Patterson, "The martial arts were seen as a way not to maintain ancient martial techniques but instead to preserve a traditional value system, Bushido, that could be used to nurture national spirit. In the midst of modernization, the Japanese were struggling to hold onto some traditions that were uniquely Japanese, and that could unify them as countrymen." For example, Kanō Jigorō argued, "Because judo developed based on the martial arts of the past, if the martial arts practitioners of the past had things that are of value, those who practice judo should pass all those things on. Among these, the samurai spirit should be celebrated even in today's society."

=== Showa (1926–1945) ===
During interbellum and Second World War Shōwa Japan, bushido was pressed into use for militarism to present war as purifying, and death a duty. Bushido was pitched as revitalizing traditional values and "transcending the modern". Bushido would provide a spiritual shield to let soldiers fight to the end. When giving orders, General Hideki Tojo routinely slapped the faces of the men under his command, saying face-slapping was a "means of training" men who came from families that were not part of the samurai caste, and for whom bushido was not second nature. Tojo wrote a chapter in the book Hijōji kokumin zenshū (Essays in time of national emergency) which the Army Ministry published in March 1934. It called for Japan to become a totalitarian "national defense state". It included 15 essays by senior generals and argued Japan defeated Russia in the Russo–Japanese War because bushido gave the Japanese superior willpower: they did not fear death, unlike the Russians who wanted to live.

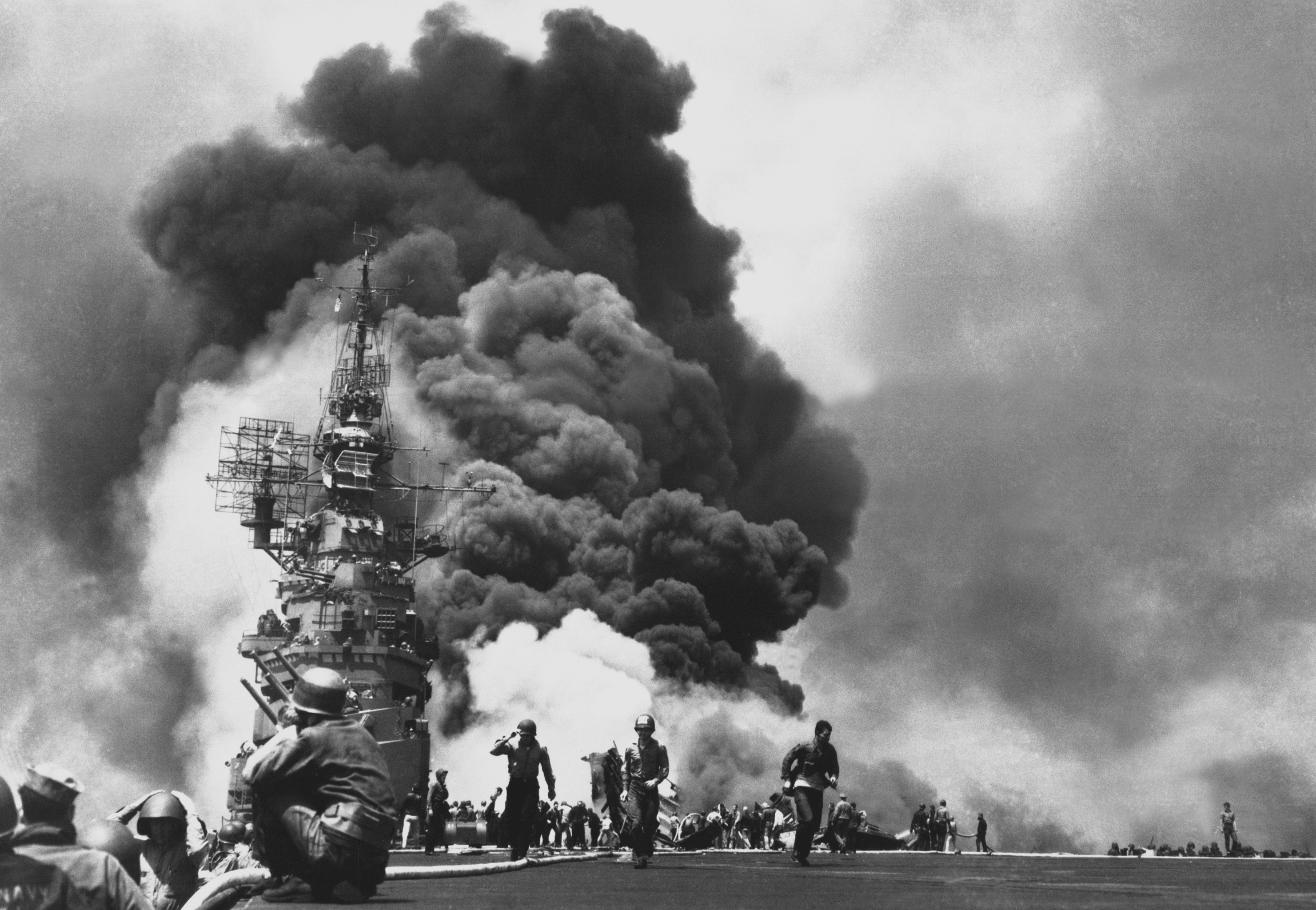
When the aircraft carrier USS Bunker Hill was hit by two kamikazes on 11 May 1945, 389 personnel were killed or went missing, and 264 were wounded.

As the Second World War turned, the spirit of bushido was invoked to urge that all depended on the firm and united soul of the nation. When Japan lost the Battle of Attu, the government attempted to paint the more than two thousand Japanese deaths as an inspirational epic for the fighting spirit of the nation. Arguments that the plans for the Battle of Leyte Gulf, involving all Japanese ships, would expose Japan to danger if they failed, were countered with the plea that the Navy be permitted to "bloom as flowers of death". The Japanese believed that indoctrination in bushido would give them the edge as the Japanese longed to die for the emperor, while the Americans were afraid to die. However, superior American pilot training and airplanes meant the Japanese were outclassed by the Americans. The first proposals of organized suicide attacks met resistance. While bushido called for a warrior to be always aware of death, they were not to view it as the sole end. However, desperation brought about acceptance and such attacks were acclaimed as the true spirit of bushido.

Bushido regarded surrender as cowardly. Those who did forfeited their honor and lost dignity and respect:

As Japan continued its modernization in the early 20th century, its armed forces became convinced that success in battle would be assured if Japanese soldiers, sailors, and airmen had the "spirit" of Bushido. ... The result was that the Bushido code of behavior "was inculcated into the Japanese soldier as part of his basic training". Each soldier was indoctrinated to accept that it was the greatest honor to die for the Emperor, and it was cowardly to surrender to the enemy. ... Bushido therefore explains why the Japanese in the NEI so mistreated POWs in their custody. Those who had surrendered to the Japanese—regardless of how courageously or honorably they had fought—merited nothing but contempt; they had forfeited all honor and literally deserved nothing. Consequently, when the Japanese murdered POWs by shooting, beheading, and drowning, these acts were excused since they involved the killing of men who had forfeited all rights to be treated with dignity or respect. While civilian internees were certainly in a different category from POWs, it is reasonable to think that there was a "spill-over" effect from the tenets of Bushido.

— Fred Borch, Military Trials of War Criminals in the Netherlands East Indies 1946–1949

The practice of beheading captured soldiers and prisoners originates from samurai culture in the 14th century or earlier. Japanese propaganda claimed prisoners of war captured during the Second World War denied mistreatment, and declared they were treated well by virtue of bushido generosity. Broadcast interviews with prisoners were described as not propaganda and voluntarily given based on such sympathy for the enemy that only bushido could inspire.

During the Second World War, many Japanese infantrymen were trapped on Guam, surrounded by Allied forces and low on supplies. Despite being outnumbered and in horrific conditions, many soldiers refused to surrender. Nitobe Inazō wrote, "They continued to honor the Bushido code, believing that to rush into the thick of battle and to be slain in it, is easy enough ... but, it is true courage to live when it is right to live, and to die only when it is right to die".

== Contemporary bushido ==
Bushido is still present in the social and economic organization of Japan. The samurai spirit and the virtues can still be found in Japanese society. Notable Japanese consider bushido an important part of their culture.

=== Business ===
Bushido affects myriad aspects of Japanese society and culture. In addition to impacts on military performance, media, entertainment, martial arts, medicine, and social work, the bushido code has catalyzed corporate behavior. It is the mode of thought that historically structured the capitalist activity in the 20th century. Business relations, the close relationship between the individual and the group to which he or she belongs, the notions of trust, respect, and harmony within the Japanese business world are based on bushido. Therefore, this is at the origin of the industrial harmony (ja:労使協調) ideology of modern Japan. It allowed the country to become, with the Japanese economic miracle, the economic leader of Asia in the post-war years of the 1950s-1960s. The industrialist Eiichi Shibusawa preached bushido as necessary for future times, and the spirit of Japanese business from the Meiji era to the Taishō Democracy was advocated, which became the backbone necessary for Japanese management.

Shinya Fujimura examines Samurai ethics in the academic article The Samurai Ethics: A Paradigm for Corporate Behavior. Bushido principles indicate that rapid economic growth does not have to be a goal of modern existence. Relatedly, economic contentment is attainable regardless of hegemonic gross domestic product statistics. In Fujimura's words, "The tradition permeates the country's corporate culture and has informed many of its social developments". Fujimura states egalitarian principles practiced by the Samurai have permeated through modern business society and culture. Principles like Honorable Poverty, "Seihin," encourage those with power and resources to share their wealth, directly influencing national success. Bushido also provides enterprises with social meaning. Eloquently described by Fujimura, "The moral purpose that bushido articulates transcends booms and busts ... it is often said that a Japanese company is like a family, with executives caring about employees and employees showing respect to executives. Bushido, then, is part of the basis for a sense of national identity and belonging—an ideal that says the Japanese are one people, in it together.

In Taiwan, there continued to be positive views of bushido. Such as late ROC president Lee Teng-hui (1923–2020) admired traditional Japanese values and bushido influenced him. In Japanese Taiwan, Teng-hui learned kendo in school and he was deeply influenced by bushido and the Japanese Bushido spirit, which had a significant impact on his future life. He wrote the 2003 Japanese book "Bushido" Precis: What is Noblesse oblige? which strived to boost Japan's morale during the economic stagnation by appealing to Japan's warrior spirit.

=== Communication ===
In the utilization of bushido's seven virtues, the Samurai code has been renewed to contribute to the development of communication skills between adult Japanese couples. Composed in 2012, the empirical document "The Bushido Matrix for Couple Communication" identifies a methodology that can be employed by counseling agents to guide adults in self-reflection and share emotions with their partner. This activity centers on the "Bushido Matrix Worksheet" (BMW). The authors accentuate, "practicing Bushido virtues can ultimately enhance intra- and interpersonal relationship, beginning with personal awareness and extending to couple awareness. When utilizing the matrix, a couple is asked to identify one of the seven virtues and apply it to their past and current perceptions surrounding its prevalence in their lives. If individuals identify their relationship to be absent that specific virtue, they may now ponder its inclusion for their benevolence.

=== Martial arts ===
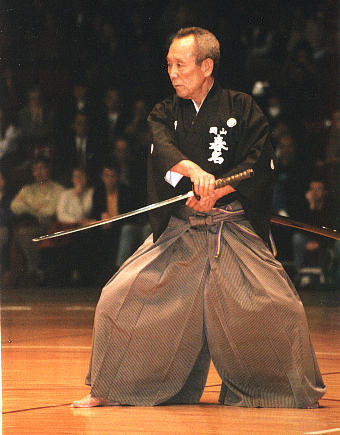
Iaido sensei Haruna Matsuo

The bushido spirit exists in Japanese martial arts. Modern bushido focuses more on self-defense, fighting, sports, tournaments, and just physical fitness training. While all of these things are important to the martial arts, a much more important thing is missing, which is personal development. Bushido's art taught soldiers the important secrets of life, how to raise children, how to dress, how to treat family and other people, how to cultivate personality, and things related to finances. All of these things are important to be a respected soldier. Although modern bushido is guided by eight virtues, that alone is not enough. Bushido not only taught one how to become a soldier, but also all the stages of life. The warrior described by bushido is not a profession but a way of life. It is not necessary to be in the army to be a soldier. The term "warrior" refers to a person who is fighting for something, not necessarily physically. Man is a true warrior because of what is in his heart, mind, and soul. Everything else is just tools in the creation to make it perfect. Bushido is a way of life that means living in every moment, honorably and honestly. All this is of great importance in the life of a soldier, both now and in the past.

In the book Kata – The true essence of Budo martial arts?, Simon Dodd and David Brown state that bushido spiritualism led the martial art 'Bujutsu' to evolve into modern 'Budō' (武道). For their analysis, they review the Kamakura period to reiterate the influence bushido held in martial arts evolution. They distinctly state, "For clarity any reference to bushido is in relation to bujutsu within the Kamakura to pre-Meiji restoration period (pre-1868), and any links to budo are referring to the modern form of the martial arts." To supplement this affirmation Dodd and Brown discuss the variance between the meaning behind Bujutsu and Budo. According to Todd and Brown, Budo is a redevelopment of traditional Kamakura period martial arts principles; Budo defines the way of the warrior through roots in religious ethics and philosophy. The martial art form's translation binds it to Confucian and Buddhist concepts of bushido:

Respected karate-ka Kousaku Yokota explains how Bujutsu could be considered the "art of fighting or killing" and encompasses a 'win at all costs' mentality required for battlefield survival (Yokota, 2010, p. 185). Conversely, Budo could be considered the "art of living or life" and enables a practitioner to live "honestly and righteously or at least with principles". Expanding on both these points, Deshimaru (1982, p. 11; p. 46) reports that the ideogram for bu means "the cease the struggle" and that "in Budo the point is...to find peace and mastery of the self"

Iaidō, in its transmission and its practice, is the martial art that takes up, in its entirety, bushido by the etiquette, the code of honor, the dress, the carrying of the sword, and the fight against oneself rather than against the opponent. Modern combat sports like kendo derive their philosophy from bushido; unlike other martial arts, prolonged contact or multiple hits tend to be disadvantage in favor of simple, clean attacks on the body. Bushido has also inspired the code of honor for disciplines such as aikijutsu, aikido, aikibudo, judo, jujitsu, Kyudo, or the chanbara.

Kendo has the bushido spirit as epitomized by the motto Ken Zen Ichi Nyo (lit. "the sword and Zen are one") (剣 禅 一 如). The philosopher Tetsuro Watsuji (1889–1960) wrote that kendo involves raising a struggle to a life-transcending level by freeing oneself from an attachment to life. Kendo inculcates moral instruction through strict adherence to a code of etiquette. There are kamidana (miniature Shinto shrine) in the dojo. The basic attitude in Kendo is noble by shunning base feelings, and the aim is to conquer the self.

=== Way of life ===
Some people use bushido as a way of life. For example, the Japanese music artist Gackt said that his philosophical way of life is similar to bushido. In 2011, during interviews about his martial arts action movie Bunraku (2010), he said:

Being Japanese, bushido is my roots, and is an important part of my country's culture. I believe it is my role to share this beautiful culture with the world. Bushido is a big part of me personally as well as in my professional career....Bushido is also the core of how I think, feel, and live so I felt this was a great opportunity for me to express to the world what "Bushido" really means.

— Gackt

Other notable people who used bushido in life include Chinese leader Chiang Kai-shek, who adopted Bushido during his education in Japan.

In October 2011, Spain's Prince of Asturias Award for Concord was given to the heroes of the Fukushima Daiichi nuclear disaster, aka the Fukushima 50. They were praised for their conduct, which "embodied the values most deeply rooted in Japanese society" and "courage and exemplary behaviour" with self-sacrifice. This was described by the media as "samurai spirit".

=== Japan Self-Defense Forces ===
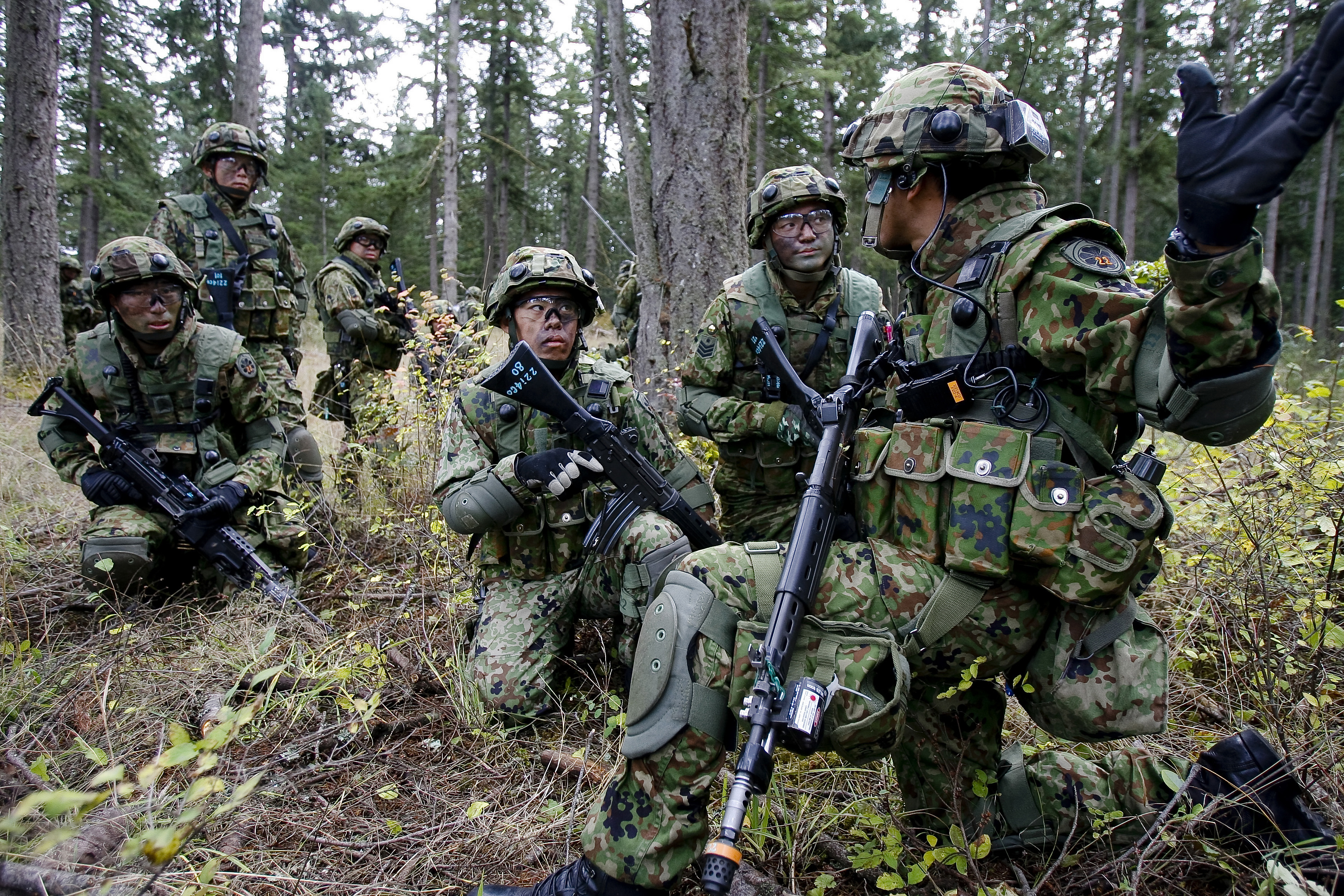
JSDF soldiers during a training exercise

The Japan Self-Defense Forces (JSDF) are the successor of the Armed Forces of the Empire of Japan, which existed from 1868 till 1947. The JSDF was officially established with the Self-Defense Forces Act in 1954 (Act No. 165 of 1954). It is primarily used for national defense due to limitations of Article 9 of the Japanese Constitution. Bushido is only used symbolically for example with names for combat exercises such as Exercise Bushido Guardian (2019). There are supporters and opposition for introducing bushido to the JSDF.

==== Supporters ====
Since 2000, numerous general officers have proclaimed the importance of bushido with lectures. Bushido is useful for uniting troops with slogans such as "bravery", "discipline", and "honesty". Takashi Araya is an author, martial artist and JGSDF veteran (1982–2008) who established the first special forces of the JSDF. Araya wrote the 2015 book To those who Fight: Japan's Cause and Bushido. He describes the essence of bushido which was created over a thousand years, and stresses the importance of training soldiers with bushido. He argues the purpose of Japanese martial arts is not to kill other people, but to cleanse their evil spirits and open the way for coexistence and co-prosperity. He says that by training soldiers with bushido, they can become the strongest fighting special forces. He wants JSDF members to inherit bushido to be brave and live dignifiedly. By using the action philosophy of bushido, they can become not only strong technologically, but also spiritually.

==== Opposition ====
Some critics say that excessive praise of bushido could repeat the mistakes of the former Imperial Armed Forces. The old Japanese military officer training of the IJA emphasized courage under fire (assault) instead of scientific ability. This created close solidarity between the soldiers and officers, but the officers lacked the skills that the soldiers had. Japanese troops put high significance on dying bravely and spiritual value instead of long-term endurance. This resulted in "an inclination toward spirituality that ignores reality." This ethos exists in the JSDF. By having officers act like soldiers to earn their loyalty with the courage of bushido, it causes sleep deprivation. It's disputed whether it has significance for modern warfare, such as space warfare and cyberwarfare.

There was a case of a National Police Reserve (1950–1954) member who committed seppuku to apologize for being unable to become an ideal soldier. Another example was a young squadron commander who failed an exercise due to repeatedly attacking rather than changing tactics. The pre-war Imperial Japanese Navy researcher Alexander Chiralfi said the Japanese mindset was subjective and had no interest in academically analysing unrelated maritime issues. Subjective and short-sighted discussions don't yield wise strategies. The ideal image of executives should change according to the times and strategic environment. Thus, feudal bushido may not fit in a modern strategic environment and culture. Critics argue that the Meiji Army defeated the Qing and the Imperial Russian Army, not because of bushido, but because it was a professional military organization. Therefore, Bushido should not become the values of the whole JSDF. Rather, the ideal image of JSDF executives should be defined to achieve national interests.

== Bushido types and tenets ==
Multiple bushido types have existed through history. The code varied due to influences such as Zen Buddhism, Shinto, Confucianism, as well as changes in society and on the battlefield. The consistent ideal is martial spirit, including athletic, military skills, and valor: fearlessness toward the enemy in battle. Bushido is a path that the samurai of each era pursued for their entire existence.

=== Sengoku bushido ===
- Period: Muromachi-Azuchi (Sengoku period) (1336–1603)
- Representative and important figures: Takeda Shingen, Uesugi Kenshin, Oda Nobunaga, Tokugawa Ieyasu, Katō Kiyomasa, Nabeshima Naoshige

During this era, the daimyo expanded their territory by force and strategy. Battles occurred frequently in various places. The purpose was to expand one's power. The killing of the enemy in a battle led to an evaluation. Certain daimyos wrote about moral codes with influence from Zen Buddhism and Confucianism. There was not yet a strong attachment to moral values (apart from honor) in samurai society. Honor, weaponry, and warfare were valued as of the utmost importance in Japanese culture. Low priority was placed on monetary savings.

==== Tenets ====
- Honor
- Warfare
- Weapon mastery
- Martial arts
- Valor in battle
- Early moral codes

=== Edo bushido ===
- Period: Early to late Edo (1603–1868)
- Representative and important figures: Kōsaka Masanobu, Saito Chikamori, Yamaga Soko, Daidoji Tomoyama, Yagyu Munenori, Yamaoka Tesshu, Miyamoto Musashi, Yamamoto Tsunetomo, Hishikawa Moronobu

After the chaotic Sengoku period, politics were carried out in an orderly fashion, and peace was maintained. The samurai could no longer obtain merit on the battlefield. They found more significance in the samurai's existence in areas other than battle. As per Confucianism, it was valued to work for morals and the public, not for personal reasons. In addition, there were many martial arts that included religious boundaries, such as Buddhism and Shinto. A famous example is a passage in the Hagakure: "Bushido is realised in the presence of death. In the case of having to choose between life and death, you should choose death. There is no other reasoning. Move on with determination." It can be difficult to interpret, but it was radical at the time. That appeared in the Taihei era of the Edo period. The oral tradition of the Saga Domain feudal lord Nabeshima Mitsushige, Yamamoto Tsunetomo, is the main subject. Many expressions criticize the samurai who are associated with Confucianism and Buddhism, which were popular at the time. Many works guide the art of treatment while describing the spirit of the samurai of the Sengoku period.

==== Tenets ====
Bushidō expanded and formalized the earlier code of the samurai, and stressed sincerity, frugality, loyalty, mastery of martial arts, and honour to the death. Under the bushidō ideal, if a samurai failed to uphold his honor he could only regain it by performing seppuku (ritual suicide). The core of bushido consists of a combination of teachings from Japan's three main philosophical traditions: 1. Buddhist precepts of serenity, stoicism, and non-attachment to life. 2. Shinto notions of fidelity and patriotism, and 3. Confucian morality. People imbued with bushi katagi (武士気質; lit. "samurai spirit") can serenely carry out their work in the face of any adversity, and have the willpower to master themselves. Taira Shigesuke, Daidōji Yūzan wrote Bushido Shoshinshu (武道初心集) (pre-1730), which provides practical and moral instructions for samurai to improve personal, social, and professional standards.

In an excerpt from his book Samurai: The World of the Warrior, historian Stephen Turnbull describes the role of seppuku in feudal Japan:

In the world of the warrior, seppuku was a deed of bravery that was admirable in a samurai who knew he was defeated, disgraced, or mortally wounded. It meant that he could end his days with his transgressions wiped away and with his reputation not merely intact but actually enhanced. The cutting of the abdomen released the samurai's spirit most dramatically, but it was an extremely painful and unpleasant way to die, and sometimes the samurai who was performing the act asked a loyal comrade to cut off his head at the moment of agony.

Bushidō varied dramatically over time, and across the geographic and socio-economic backgrounds of the samurai, who represented somewhere between 5% and 10% of the Japanese population. The first Meiji-era census at the end of the 19th century counted 1,282,000 members of the "high samurai", allowed to ride a horse, and 492,000 members of the "low samurai", allowed to wear two swords but not to ride a horse, in a country of about 25 million.

Some versions of bushidō include compassion for those of lower station, and for the preservation of one's name. Early bushidō literature further enforces the requirement to conduct oneself with calmness, fairness, justice, and propriety. The relationship between learning and the way of the warrior is clearly articulated, one being a natural partner to the other. Other pundits pontificating on the warrior philosophy covered methods of raising children, appearance, and grooming, but all of this may be seen as part of one's constant preparation for death—to die a good death with one's honor intact, the ultimate aim in a life lived according to bushidō. Indeed, a "good death" is its own reward, and by no means assurance of "future rewards" in the afterlife. Some samurai, though certainly not all (e.g., Amakusa Shirō), have throughout history held such aims or beliefs in disdain, or expressed the awareness that their station—as it involves killing—precludes such reward, especially in Buddhism. Japanese beliefs surrounding the samurai and the afterlife are complex and often contradictory, while the soul of a noble warrior suffering in hell or as a lingering spirit occasionally appears in Japanese art and literature, so does the idea of a warrior being reborn upon a lotus throne in paradise.

The essence of bushido was defined by Saitō Chikamori as:

- Sincerity – do not lie, do not be insincere, do not be superficial
- Responsibility – do not be obsequious
- Frugality – do not be greedy
- Politeness – do not be rude, do not slander
- Modesty – do not be boastful, do not be arrogant
- Loyalty – do not be unfaithful
- Harmony – be on good terms with comrades
- Tranquility – do not be overly concerned with events
- Compassion – show concern for one another, be compassionate, with a strong sense of duty.

=== Meiji bushido ===
- Period: Meiji to mid Showa (1868–1945).
- Representative and important figures: Nitobe Inazō, Yukio Mishima, Kanō Jigorō, Kanno Kakumyō, Eiichi Shibusawa, Fukuzawa Yukichi

Meiji bushido added absolute subservience to the will of the Emperor with an emphasis on loyalty and self-sacrifice. The book Bushido: The Soul of Japan by Nitobe Inazō popularized bushido internationally during the Meiji era. However, the morals that he described are romanticized interpretations and do not represent all of bushido through history.

In the Taishō era, bushido as the way of the merchant was advocated by industrialist Shibusawa Eiichi (1840–1931), known as the "father of Japanese capitalism". Shibusawa was also a warrior who learned Shindō Munen-ryū and Hokushin Ittō-ryū. He spent some time as a vassal of Tokugawa Yoshinobu, and since the Meiji era, he was a businessman and involved in the establishment of hundreds of corporations. In his book "Theory and Arithmetic" (論語と算盤), he advocated the word "samurai business talent" (士魂商才). He linked the spirit of the samurai (bushido with the influence of Confucianism) to economic activity and denied immoral merchants for self-interest.

==== Eight virtues of bushido (as defined by Nitobe Inazō) ====
As mentioned above, historically there was no unified code, which varied from clan to clan, but the so-called bushidō code was typified by eight virtues according to Nitobe Inazō, while he was in the United States, under obvious influence of western chivalry notions in the Meiji Period (1900): Nitobe defined bushido as "the ways which fighting nobles should observe in their daily life as in their vocation."

- Righteousness (義, gi)

Be acutely honest throughout your dealings with all people. Believe in justice, not from other people, but from yourself. To the true warrior, all points of view are deeply considered regarding honesty, justice, and integrity. Warriors make a full commitment to their decisions.

- Heroic Courage (勇, yū)

Hiding like a turtle in a shell is not living at all. A true warrior must have courage. It is absolutely risky. It is living life completely, fully, and wonderfully. Heroic courage is not blind. It is intelligent and strong.

- Benevolence, Compassion (仁, jin)

Through intense training and hard work, the true warrior becomes quick and strong. They are not like most people. They develop a power that must be used for good. They have compassion. They help their fellow men at every opportunity. If an opportunity does not arise, they go out of their way to find one.

- Respect (礼, rei)

True warriors have no reason to be cruel. They do not need to prove their strength. Warriors are not only respected for their strength in battle, but also for their dealings with others. The true strength of a warrior becomes apparent during difficult times.

- Honesty (誠, makoto)

When warriors say that they will act, it is as good as done. Nothing will stop them from completing what they say they will do. They do not have to 'give their word'. They do not have to 'promise'. Speaking and doing are the same action.

- Honour (名誉, meiyo)

Warriors have only one judge of honor and character, and this is themselves. The decisions they make and how these decisions are carried out are a reflection of who they truly are. You cannot hide from yourself.

- Duty and Loyalty (忠義, chūgi)

Warriors are responsible for everything that they have done and everything that they have said, and all of the consequences that follow. They are immensely loyal to all of those in their care. To everyone that they are responsible for, they remain fiercely true.

- Self-Control (自制, jisei)

==== Associated virtues ====
- Filial piety (孝, kō)
- Wisdom (智, chi)
- Fraternity (悌, tei)
- Duty (義理, giri) (Giri (Japanese))

=== Contemporary bushido ===
- Period: 1950–Present
- Representative and important figures: Chiang Kai-shek, Gackt, Fukushima 50

Bushido continues to exist in various forms in for example business, communication, martial arts, and as a way of life. This is also called the bushido spirit.

== Modern translations ==
Modern Western translation of documents related to bushidō began in the 1970s with Carl Steenstrup, who performed research into the ethical codes of famous samurai including Hōjō Sōun and Imagawa Sadayo.

Primary research into bushidō was later conducted by William Scott Wilson in his 1982 text Ideals of the Samurai: Writings of Japanese Warriors. The writings span hundreds of years, family lineage, geography, social class, and writing style—yet share a common set of values. Wilson's work also examined older Japanese writings unrelated to the warrior class: the Kojiki, Shoku Nihongi, the Kokin Wakashū, and the Konjaku Monogatari, as well as the Chinese Classics (the Analects, the Great Learning, the Doctrine of the Mean, and the Mencius). In May 2008, Thomas Cleary translated a collection of 22 writings on bushidō by warriors, scholars, political advisers, and educators, spanning 500 years from the 14th to the 19th centuries. Titled Training the Samurai Mind: A Bushido Sourcebook, it gave an insider's view of the samurai world: "the moral and psychological development of the warrior, the ethical standards they were meant to uphold, their training in both martial arts and strategy, and the enormous role that the traditions of Shintoism, Buddhism, Confucianism, and Taoism had in influencing samurai ideals".

== In literature ==
Examples of important Japanese literature related to bushido from the 12th to the 21st century:

Author	English title	Japanese title	Date
Hōjō Shigetoki	The Message of Master Gokurakuji		1198–1261
Ogasawara Sakuun	Shoke no Hyōjō		1621
Shiba Yoshimasa	The Chikubashō		1350–1410
Imagawa Sadayo	The Regulations of Imagawa Ryoshun		1325–1420
Asakura Toshikage	The Seventeen-Article Injunction of Asakura Toshikage		1428–1481
Hōjō Sōun	The Twenty-One Precepts Of Hōjō Sōun		1432–1519
Asakura Norikage	The Recorded Words Of Asakura Soteki		1474–1555
Takeda Shingen	The Iwamizudera Monogatari		1521–1573
Takeda Nobushige	Opinions In Ninety-Nine Articles		1525–1561
Torii Mototada	The Last Statement of Torii Mototada		1539–1600
Nabeshima Naoshige	Lord Nabeshima's Wall Inscriptions		1538–1618
Katō Kiyomasa	The Precepts of Kato Kiyomasa		1562–1611
Kōsaka Masanobu	Kōyō Gunkan	甲陽軍鑑	1616
Kuroda Nagamasa	Notes On Regulations		1568–1623
Saitō Chikamori	Kashoki	可笑記	1642
Miyamoto Musashi	The Book of Five Rings	五輪書	1645
Hishikawa Moronobu	Kokon Bushido Ezukushi (Bushido Through The Ages)	古今武士道絵つくし	1685
Yamamoto Tsunetomo and Tsuramoto Tashiro	Hagakure	葉隠	1716
Taira Shigesuke, Daidōji Yūzan	Bushido Shoshinshu	武道初心集	Before 1730
Hideki Tojo & senior generals	Hijōji Kokumin Zenshū (Essays in Time of National Emergency)	非常時國民全集	1934
Takashi Araya	To those who fight: Japan's Cause and Bushido	戦う者たちへ (日本の大義と武士道)	2015

== Major figures associated with bushido ==
- Asano Naganori
- Imagawa Ryōshun
- Katō Kiyomasa
- Sakanoue no Tamuramaro
- Honda Tadakatsu
- Tokugawa Ieyasu
- Torii Mototada
- Sasaki Kojirō
- Saigō Takamori
- Yamaga Sokō
- Yamamoto Tsunetomo
- Yamaoka Tesshū
- Yukio Mishima
- Hijikata Toshizō
- Kosaka Masanobu
- Miyamoto Musashi
- Nitobe Inazo
- Kusunoki Masashige
- Gichin Funakoshi
- Kanō Jigorō
- Dom Justo Takayama
- Morihei Ueshiba
- Takeda Sōkaku
- Hideki Tojo

== See also ==
- Budō
- Hagakure
- Hana wa sakuragi, hito wa bushi
- Japanese martial arts
- Japanese Zen
- Prussian virtues
- The Unfettered Mind
- Zen at War

== Bibliography ==
- Dixon, Body; Gilda, Laura; Bulgrin, Lon (2012). "The Archaeology of World War II Japanese Stragglers on the Island of Guam and the Bushido Code". Asian Perspectives. 51 (1): 110–127. doi:10.1353/asi.2012.0000. hdl:10125/36660. S2CID 162216662.
- Hoyt, Edwin P (1986). Japan's War: The Great Pacific Conflict, 1853-1952. McGraw-Hill. ISBN 0070306125.
- Li, Chi-Sing; Lin, Yu-Fen; Ginsburg, Phil; Eckstein, Daniel (2012). "The Bushido Matrix for Couple Communication". Family Journal. 20 (3): 299–305. doi:10.1177/1066480712449142. ISSN 1066-4807. S2CID 145112346.
- Patterson, William R (2008). "Bushido's Role in the Growth of Pre-World War II Japanese Nationalism". Journal of Asian Martial Arts. 17 (3).
- Fujimura, Shinya (2011). "The Samurai Ethics: A Paradigm for Corporate Behavior". Harvard Kennedy School Review. 11: 212–215.
- Keen, Maurice Keen (2005). Chivalry. New Haven, CT: Yale University Press.
- Shin'ichi, Saeki; Souyri, Pierre-François (2017). Samouraïs : du dit des heiké à l'intention du bushido (in French). Paris: Arkhê. ISBN 978-2-918682-29-5.
