= Bushido: The Soul of Japan =

1899 book by Inazo Nitobe

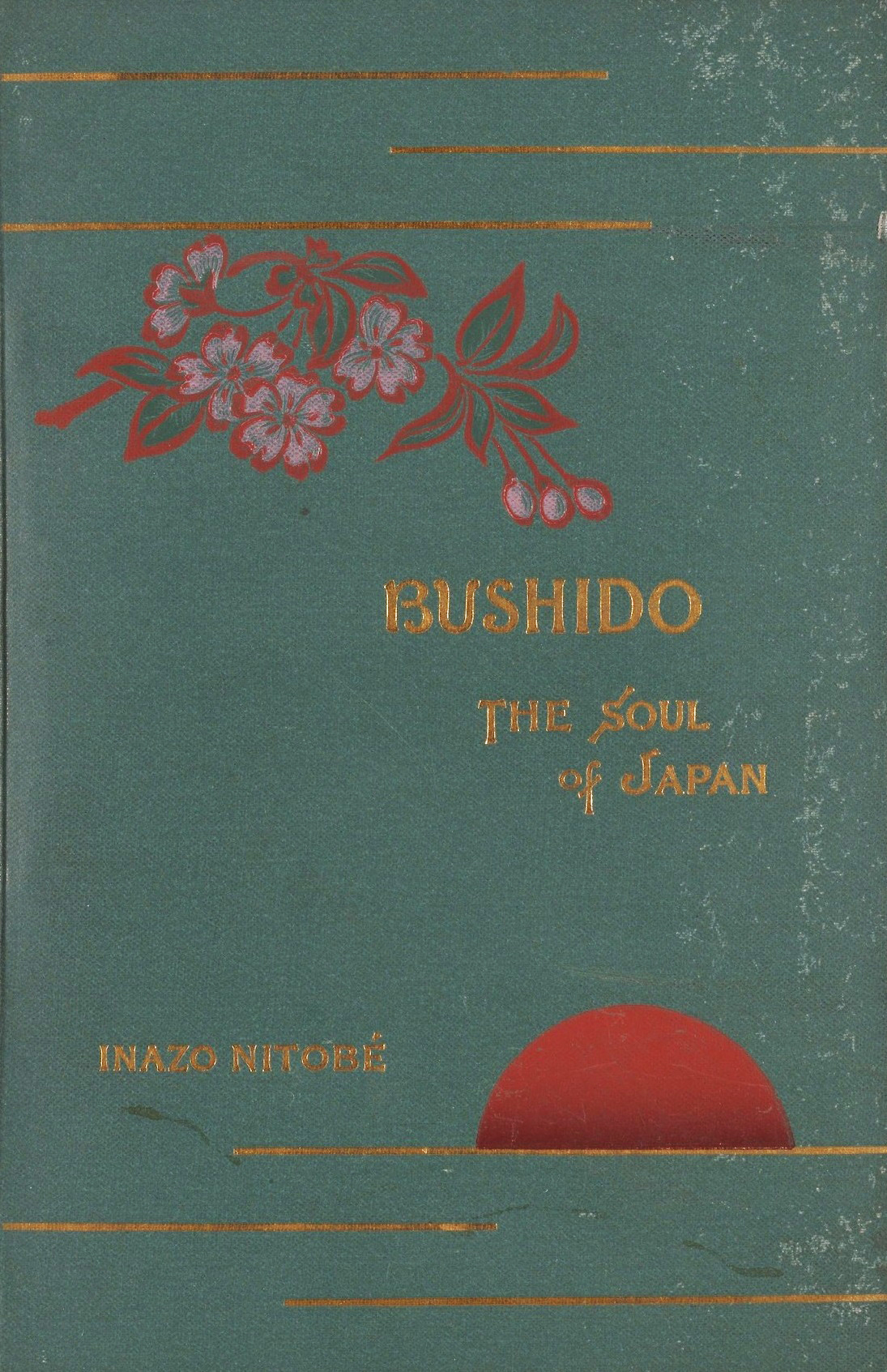
- Cover for Bushido: The Soul of Japan, 1900
- Author: Nitobe Inazō
- Subject: Conduct of life, Samurai, Japanese customs
- Publication date: 1899
- Publication place: United States
- Media type: Book
- ISBN: 9781568364407 (2017 edition, hardcover)
- Dewey Decimal: 394.70952
- LC Class: CR6090.B8 N5

Bushido: The Soul of Japan is a book written by Nitobe Inazo in English in the United States, then translated into Japanese in the following years.

== Overview ==
Bushido: The Soul of Japan is a study of the way of the samurai. A best-seller in its day, it was read by many influential figures, among them US Presidents Theodore Roosevelt and John F. Kennedy, as well as Robert Baden-Powell, the founder of the Boy Scouts.

Nitobe originally wrote Bushido: The Soul of Japan in English (1899), in Monterey, California, though according to the book's preface it was written in Malvern, Pennsylvania. The book was first published in English in New York in 1899. It was subsequently translated into Japanese in 1908 by Sakurai Hikoichirō. Thereafter, Yanaihara Tadao's translation became the standard text in Japanese which was published by Iwanami Shoten.

He found in Bushido, the Way of the Warrior, the sources of the seven virtues most admired by his people: rectitude, courage, benevolence, politeness, sincerity, honor, and loyalty.

He also delved into the other traditions of Japan, such as Confucianism, Buddhism, the indigenous Shintoism, and the moral guidelines handed down over hundreds of years by Japan's samurai and sages. Nitobe sought similarities and contrasts by citing the shapers of European and American thought and civilization going back to the Romans, the Greek, and Biblical times. He found a close resemblance between the samurai ethos of what he called Bushido and the spirit of medieval chivalry and the ethos of ancient Greece, as observed in books such as the Iliad of Homer.

However, Nitobe's imperialism and justification for interference in the Korea also shaped his perception of bushido, sometimes more so than the actual history of the concept.

== Criticism ==
The book has been criticized as portraying the samurai in terms of Western chivalry which had different interpretations compared to the pre-Meiji period bushido as a system of warrior values that were focused on valor rather than morals.

Nitobe Inazo did not coin the term bushidō. The written form bushidō was first used in Japan in 1616 with the Kōyō Gunkan. In the 17th century, the concept of bushidō spread to the common population such as the ukiyo-e book Kokon Bushidō ezukushi (古今武士道絵つくし, "Images of Bushidō Through the Ages") by artist Hishikawa Moronobu (1618–1694) which was written in the accessible kana and includes the word bushidō. Bushidō as a system of warrior values existed in multiple forms dating back to the medieval era. The unwritten form of bushidō first appeared with the rise of the samurai class and the shogun Minamoto no Yoritomo (1147–1199) in the 12th century.

Yūzō Ōta further notes that Nitobe was familiar with neither Kōyō Gunkan nor Hagakure when writing Bushido: The Soul of Japan. According to Ōta, even some thirty years after writing the book, Nitobe still believed that the term bushidō was his own coinage. Ōta attributes this in part to Nitobe's educational background: from around the time he had barely completed elementary-level education, Nitobe studied entirely in English, which, in Ōta's view, left him with a considerable lack of knowledge about Japan.
