= Arthur Lindsay Sadler =

British Japanologist (1882–1970)

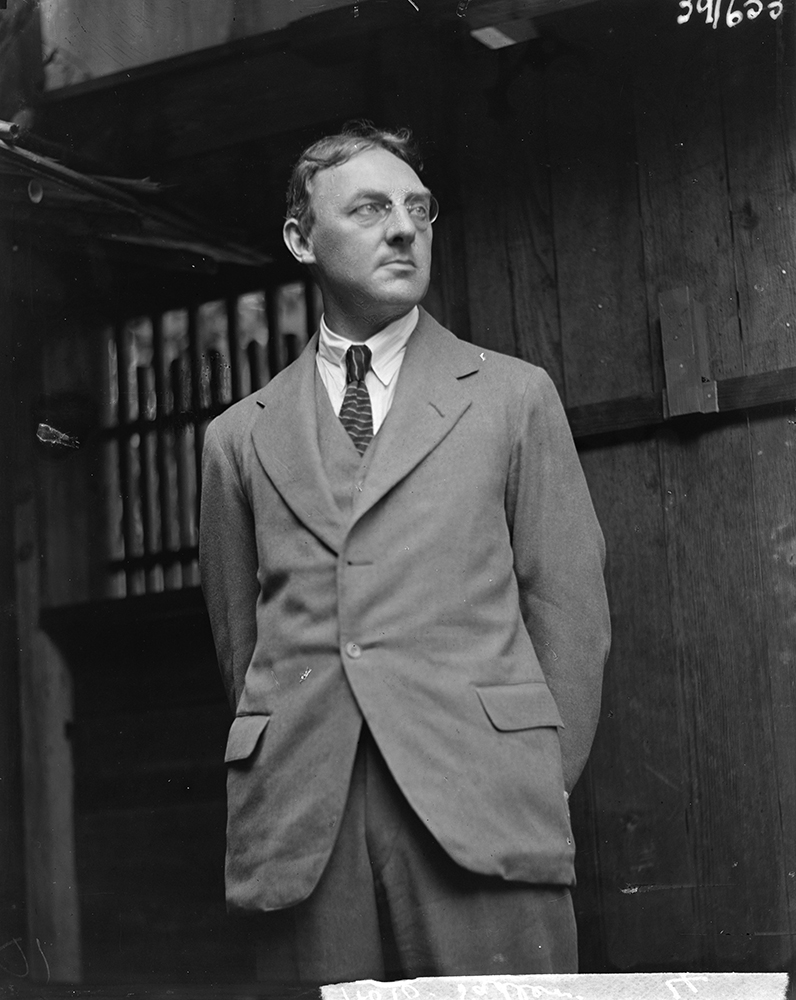
Arthur Lindsay Sadler, Wahroonga, Sydney, c. 1929

Arthur Lindsay Sadler (1882–1970) was Professor of Oriental Studies at the University of Sydney.

== Life and career ==
Sadler was born in Hackney, London and educated at the University of Oxford (B.A., 1908; M.A., 1911). From 1909 he worked in Japan as a teacher and was an active member of the Asiatic Society of Japan.

Sadler was the Professor of Oriental Studies at the University of Sydney from 1922 to 1948 (his predecessor being the foundation professor, James Murdoch). He also taught at the Royal Military College of Australia.

His publications included an English translation of Hōjōki and Heike Monogatari under the title of The Ten Foot Square Hut and Tales of the Heike (1928; 1972); The Art of Flower Arrangement in Japan (1933); Cha-No-Yu: The Japanese Tea Ceremony (1933; 1962); Maker of Modern Japan: The Life of Tokugawa Ieyasu (1937); an English translation of Daidōji Yūzan's Budo Shoshinshu under the title of The Code of The Samurai (1941; 1988); A Short History of Japanese Architecture (1941); an English translation of The Articles of Sun Tzu, of The Precepts of Sima Rangju and of Wu Qi on the Art of War as Three Military Classics of China (1944); and A Short History of Japan (1946).

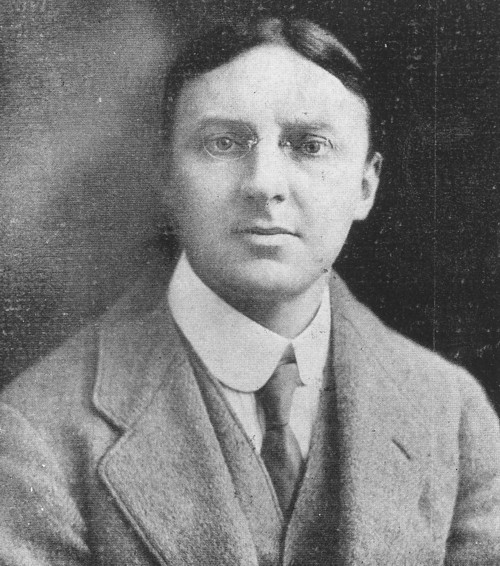
Arthur Lindsay Sadler 1922 portrait

One of Sadler's teachers at Oxford in the early 1900s had been Dr. Griffithes Wheeler Thatcher and, when in 1936 the latter was appointed the first head of the Department of Old Testament Language and Literature at the University of Sydney, one of four departments offering courses for the new Bachelorate of Divinity there, Sadler assisted in lecturing duties and in other ways.

After retirement from the University of Sydney (his successors in the professorship being John Kennedy Rideout in 1948 and then by A. R. Davis in 1955), Sadler returned to England and settled in the Essex village of Great Bardfield. At Bardfield he became friendly with several of the Great Bardfield Artists. He spent his final years living in Stubbards Croft in Great Bardfield and later at Buck's House in the same village.

== Personal life ==
In 1916, he married Eva Botan Seymour (1893-1978), an Anglo-Japanese, in Tokyo. They would have no children.
