= Obata Kagenori =

Confucian scholar (1572–1663)

Obata Kagenori (小幡景憲; 1572–1663), also known as Obata Kanbē (小幡勘兵衛), was a Confucian scholar and samurai retainer of the Takeda clan during Japan's Sengoku period.

== Family ==
Kagenori was the third son of Obata Masamori

== Life ==
Kagenori is perhaps most well known for his completion of the Kōyō Gunkan, the chronicle of the Takeda clan's military campaigns begun by Kōsaka Masanobu, and for founding the Kōshū-ryū Gungaku, a school for studying the arts of war.

Kagenori fought under Tokugawa Ieyasu at the battle of Sekigahara in 1600, and at the siege of Osaka fifteen years later.
