= Daidōji Yūzan =

Samurai in Edo period (1639–1730)

- Born: 1639
- Died: December 11, 1730 (aged 90–91)

Daidōji Yūzan (大道寺 友山; 1639 – December 11, 1730) was a samurai and military strategist of Edo period Japan. He was born in Fushimi in Yamashiro Province (present-day Fushimi-ku, Kyoto). Among the works he wrote in his late years was the widely circulated Budō Shoshin-shū (武道初心集), an introduction to warrior ethics that was influential among middle- and lower-class samurai. It has been translated into English by Arthur Lindsay Sadler as The Code of the Samurai (1941; 1988), William Scott Wilson as Budoshoshinshu: The Warrior's Primer and by Thomas Cleary.

Yūzan was the son of Daidōji Shigehisa (大道寺繁久), the grandson of Daidōji Naoshige (大道寺直繁) and the great-grandson of Daidōji Masashige (大道寺政繁), an important advisor to the Later Hōjō clan. Shigehisa had been a samurai in the service of Matsudaira Tadateru, daimyō of the Echigo Takada fief, but became a rōnin in 1619 when Tadateru was dismissed from service. Yūzan studied the arts of war in Edo under Obata Kagenori, Hōjō Ujinaga (北条氏長), Yamaga Sokō and others. He then lectured on the subject as a guest of the Asano at the Hiroshima fief, the Matsudaira clan at the Aizu fief, the Matsudaira clan at the Fukui fief, and elsewhere in Japan.

Yūzan's son Daidōji Shigetaka (大道寺重高) became a retainer of the Fukui fief with a stipend of 300 koku.
