= Hana wa sakuragi, hito wa bushi =

Japanese proverb

Hana wa sakuragi, hito wa bushi (Japanese: 花は桜木人は武士, literally "the [best] blossom is the cherry blossom; the [best] man is the warrior") is a Japanese proverb that originated in the medieval period. It is also rendered as "among blossoms the cherry blossom, among men, the warrior" or likewise.

== Meaning ==
The proverb means that as the cherry blossom (sakura) is considered foremost among flowers, so the warrior (samurai, usually referred to in Japanese as bushi) was foremost among men.

The samurai was also likened to cherry blossom as his life, while glorious, was prone to a sudden end during military service, similar to petals shed by cherry blossoms or camellia.

== Association ==
The association of cherry blossoms with the samurai class was established by the kabuki theater which also popularized the proverb. Such an association began during the mid-Edo period.

The proverb's theme is echoed in a poem attributed to the priest Ikkyū in Mottomo no sōshi (1634):

Among men the samurai [is best]; among pillars, cypress wood; among fish, the sea bream; among robes, magenta; and among cherry blossoms, those of Yoshino.

The proverb also appears in Kanadehon Chushingura from 1748. Later, the proverb was evoked in the Japanese military as a motivation following the outbreak of World War II.

== See also ==
- Bushido
- Hanami
