= Carl Steenstrup =

Danish Japanologist (1934–2014)

- Born: 1934; Vaasa, Finland
- Died: 11 November 2014 (aged 80); Berlin, Germany
- Occupation: Japanologist

Carl Steenstrup (28 December 1934 – 11 November 2014) was a Danish Japanologist.

== Biography ==
Carl Steenstrup is known for translating several works of Japanese literature, mostly those relating to the historical development of Bushido, Japanese Feudal Law, and the Kakun (House Codes) of famous Samurai Leaders Hōjō Shigetoki and Imagawa Ryoshun. Steenstrup's dissertation at Harvard University was entitled Hôjô Shigetoki (1198–1261) and his Role in the History of Political and Ethical Ideas in Japan.

Steenstrup was a civil servant for the Danish Government from 1952 to 1985 and Professor of Japanese History at LMU Munich (1985 to 2000). From 1971 to 1972, he was a lecturer in Nordic languages for Tōkai University in Tokyo, Japan. After his retirement, he lectured at Humboldt University of Berlin, and the Government Academy of Law and Economics in Irkutsk.

Steenstrup died in Berlin on 11 November 2014, at the age of 80.

== Curriculum vitae ==
- Candidatus Juris, University of Copenhagen (1957)
- Master of Arts in Japanese, University of Copenhagen (1971)
- PhD in Japanese History, Harvard University (1977)
- PhD in Japanese History, University of Copenhagen (1979)

== Career ==
- Public Administration—Denmark (1952–1985)
- Lecturer, Tôkai University—Tokyo, Japan (1971–72)
- Librarian, Asia Collection, upper librarian, Abt.ltr. in daen. wiss (1972–1983)
- Senior Fellow, Japanese—The Scandinavian Institute for Asia Research, Copenhagen (1983–1985)
- Associate Professor of Japanese History at LMU Munich (1985–2000)
- Lecturer, Humboldt University of Berlin
- Lecturer, Government Academy of Law and Economics in Irkutsk. (September 2000 to July 2001)

== Books ==
- Hôjô Shigetoki (1198–1261) and his Role in the History of Political and Ethical Ideas in Japan, London 1979. (the author's Harvard University dissertation)
- A History of Law in Japan until 1868, (Brill, 2nd ed. 1996)
- Of Japan and History, Copenhagen 1980.
- Shintô, Copenhagen 1982.
- Japan 1850–1980, Copenhagen 1982.
- Hojo Soun's Twenty-one Articles: the code of conduct of Odawara Hojo' MN 29: 3 (Autumn, 1974), 283–303. [Hôjô Sôun 北条早雲 (1432–1519), Trans. of Sôunjidono nijûichi kajô 早雲寺殿廿一箇条 ("Twenty-One Articles by Lord Sôun")
- Steenstrup, Carl. " [ ] ." Acta Orientalia XXXVI (Copenhagen, 1974). [Translations of first buke kakun (warrior family precept, see above), "The Letter to Nagatoki" (Rokuhara Sagami no kami no shisoku wo oshiuru ... jô 六波羅相模守ノ教子息 ... 状), written between 1237 and 1247, pp. 417–38. Reference in Streenstup 1977, MN 32:1

== Publications ==
- Imagawa Ryôshun. Imagawa-jô [also called Gusoku Nakaaki seishi jôjô 愚息仲秋制詞條々 and Imagawa heikisho 今川壁書]. Trans. by Carl Steenstrup, in "The Imagawa Letter: A Muromachi Warrior's Code of Conduct Which Became a Tokugawa Schoolbook." 28:3 (1973) ("Articles of Admonition by Imagawa Ryôshun to His Son Nakaaki") Attributed to Imagawa Sadayo 今川貞世 or Ryôshun 了俊 (1325–1420).
- "Hojo Shigetoki's Letter of Instruction to his Son Nagatoki," trans. "The Letter to Nagatoki" (Rokuhara Sagami no kami no shisoku wo oshiuru ... jô 六波羅相模守ノ教子息 ... 状), written between 1237 and 1247, pp. 417–38. Acta Orientalia 36 (1974)
- Hôjô Shigetoki. Gokurakuji-dono go-shôsoku.極楽寺殿御消息 ("The Gokurakuji Letter") by Hôjô Shigetoki 北条重時 (1198–1261)Trans. by Carl Steenstrup, in "The Gokurakuji Letter: Hôjô Shigetoki's Compendium of Political and Religious Ideas of Thirteenth-Century Japan." 32:1 (1977)
- Steenstrup, Carl. "Sata Mirensho: A Fourteenth-Century Law Primer." MN 35: 4 (Winter, 1980), 405–435. [Compiled in Kamakura sometime between 1319 and 1322. Trans. of Sata Mirensho 沙汰未練書 ("A Book for Those Unskilled in Legal Matters") from p. 408.
- Shintô, Copenhagen 1982.
- Japan 1850–1980, Copenhagen 1982.
- "The 'Deities of Evil' or magatsuhi no kami in Kojiki and After." Acta Orientalia 45,(1984)
- “Law Code Versus Political Change in China and Japan” International Society for the Comparative Study of Civilizations, Comparative Civilizations Review, Number 16 (Fall 1987)
- "Reason and borders of the human rights in the Japanese understanding", Walter Schweidler, Hrsg.: Human rights and public spirit - western and eastern way?, Sank Augustin: Academia publishing house (1998)
- A review of "The Taming of the Samurai: Honorific Individualism and the Making of Modern Japan." by Eiko Ikegami in Journal of Japanese Studies 22:2 (1996)
- Yoritomo and the Founding of the First Bakufu: The Origins of Dual Government in Japan Review by Carl Steenstrup, JJS 27.1 (Winter 2001)
- "Historical Jurisprudence", Kracht and Rütterman, eds., Grundriss der Japanologie (Harrassowitz, 2001), Wiesbaden: Harrassowitz publishing house (2001), vii, 650 S. (IZUMI. sources, studies and materials for the culture of Japan. Edited by Klaus Kracht, Bd. 7)
- The Munakata Clan Code of 1313. How a Clan of Hereditary Shrine Priests with Warrior Status Modernized Their Rule and Survived in Power Japonica Humboldtiana (2003).
- A review of "Emperor and Aristocracy in Japan, 1467–1680: Resilience and Renewal." By Lee Butler. Harvard University Asia Center, Cambridge, Mass., 2002. Journal of Japanese Studies 30:1 (2004)
