= Kōyō Gunkan =

1616 military record by Obata Kagenori

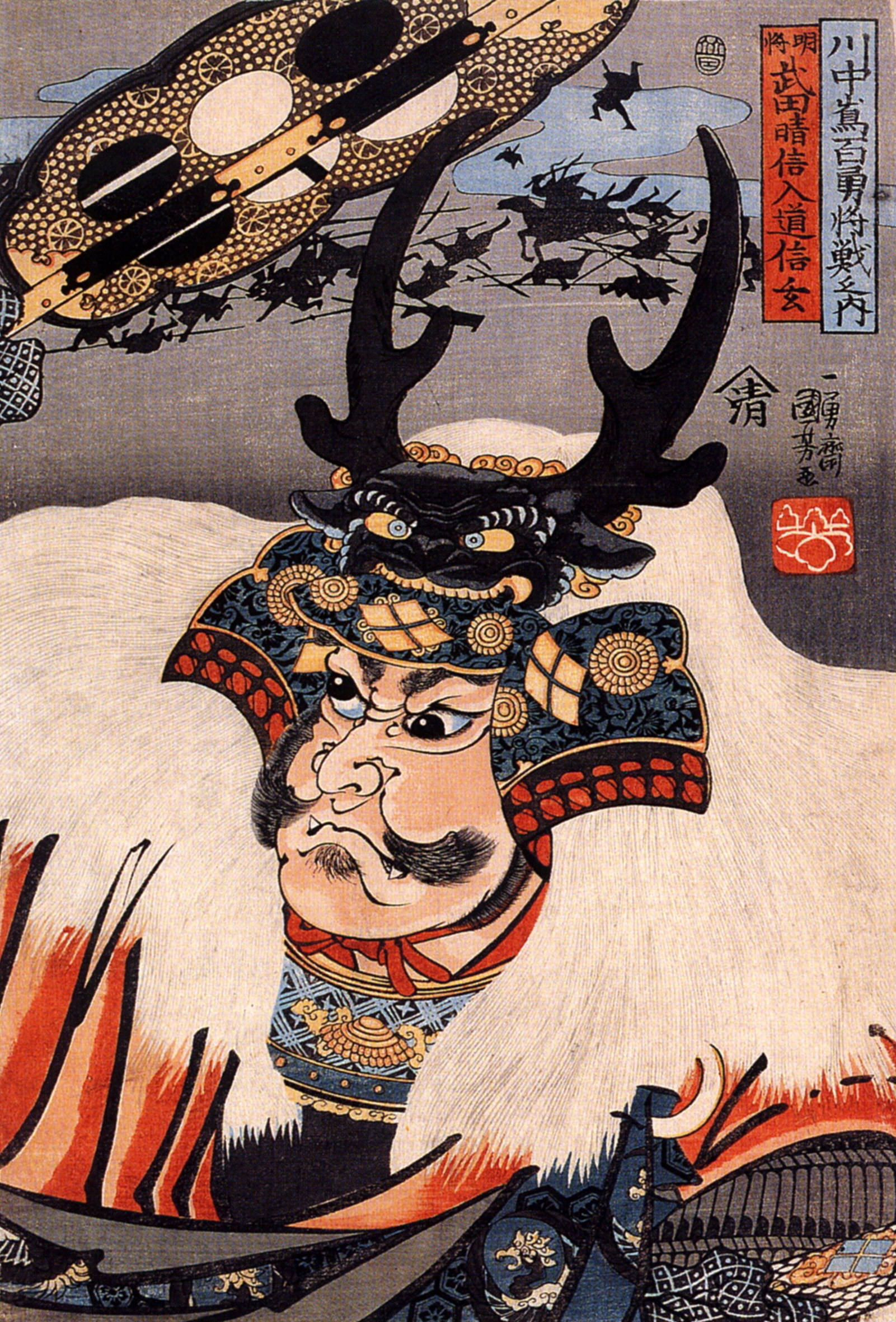
Takeda Shingen, head of the Takeda family which is the subject of the Kōyō Gunkan, in a print by Utagawa Kuniyoshi.

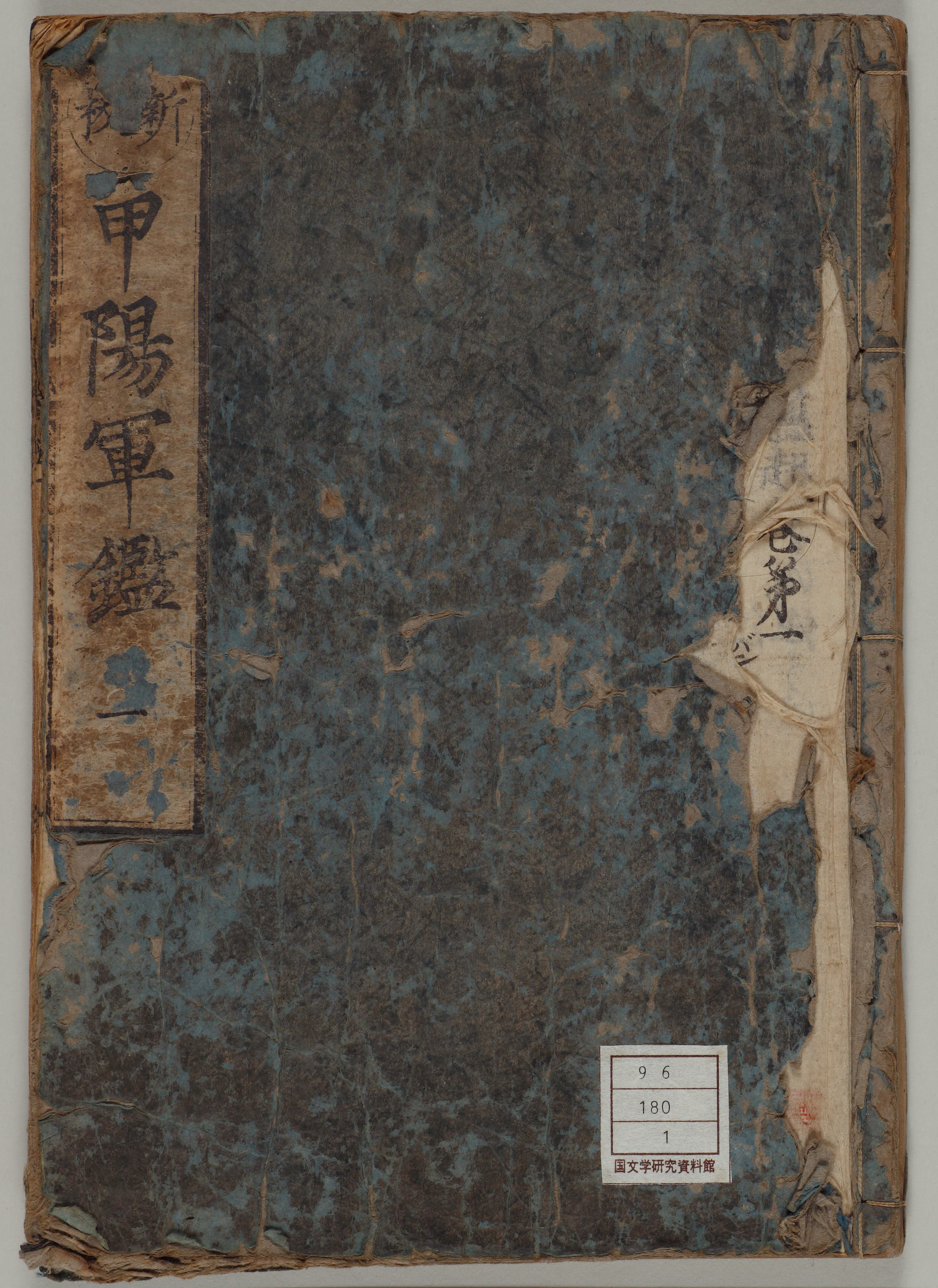
Koyo Gunkan book cover

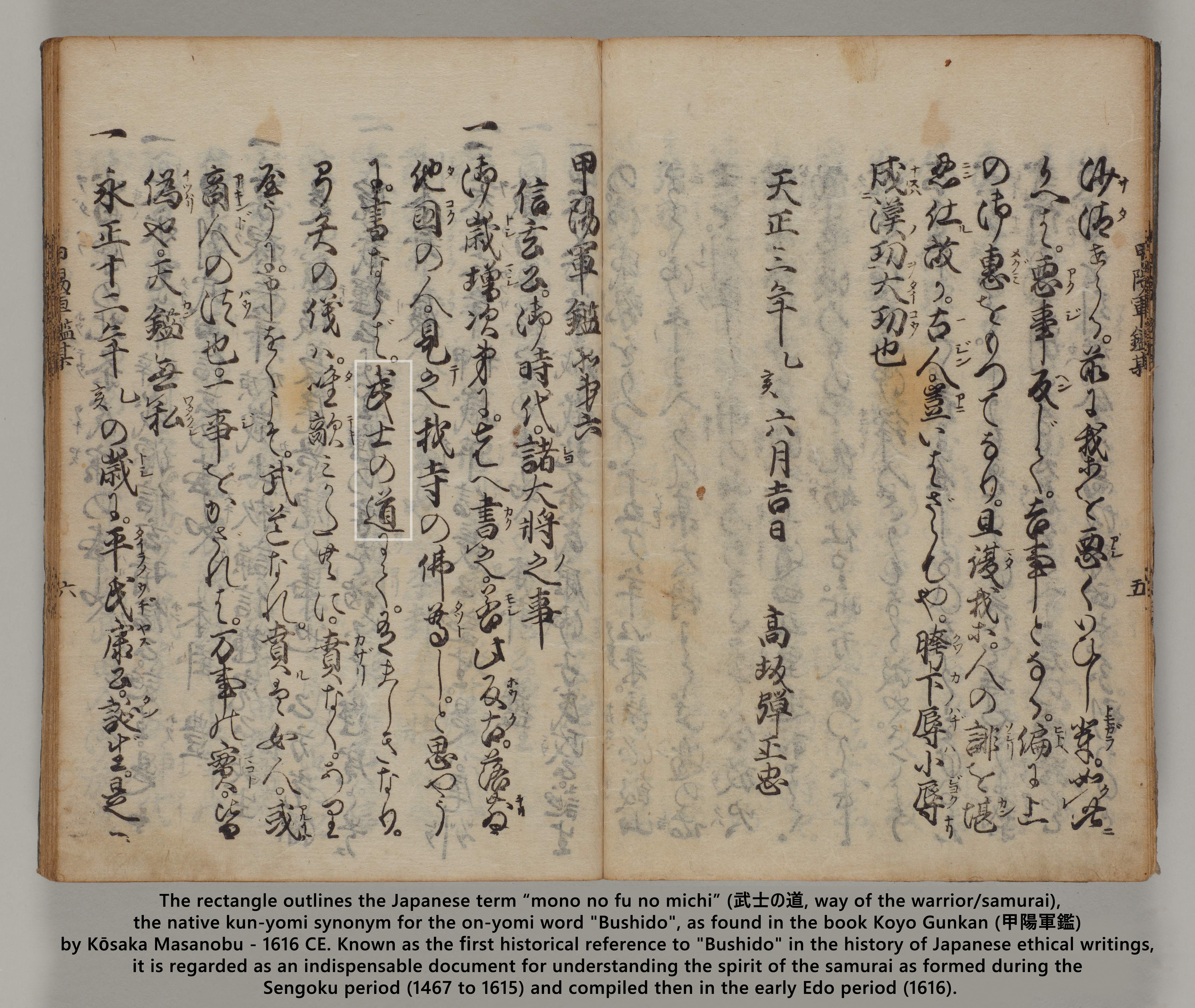
The word bushido in the Koyo Gunkan (1616)

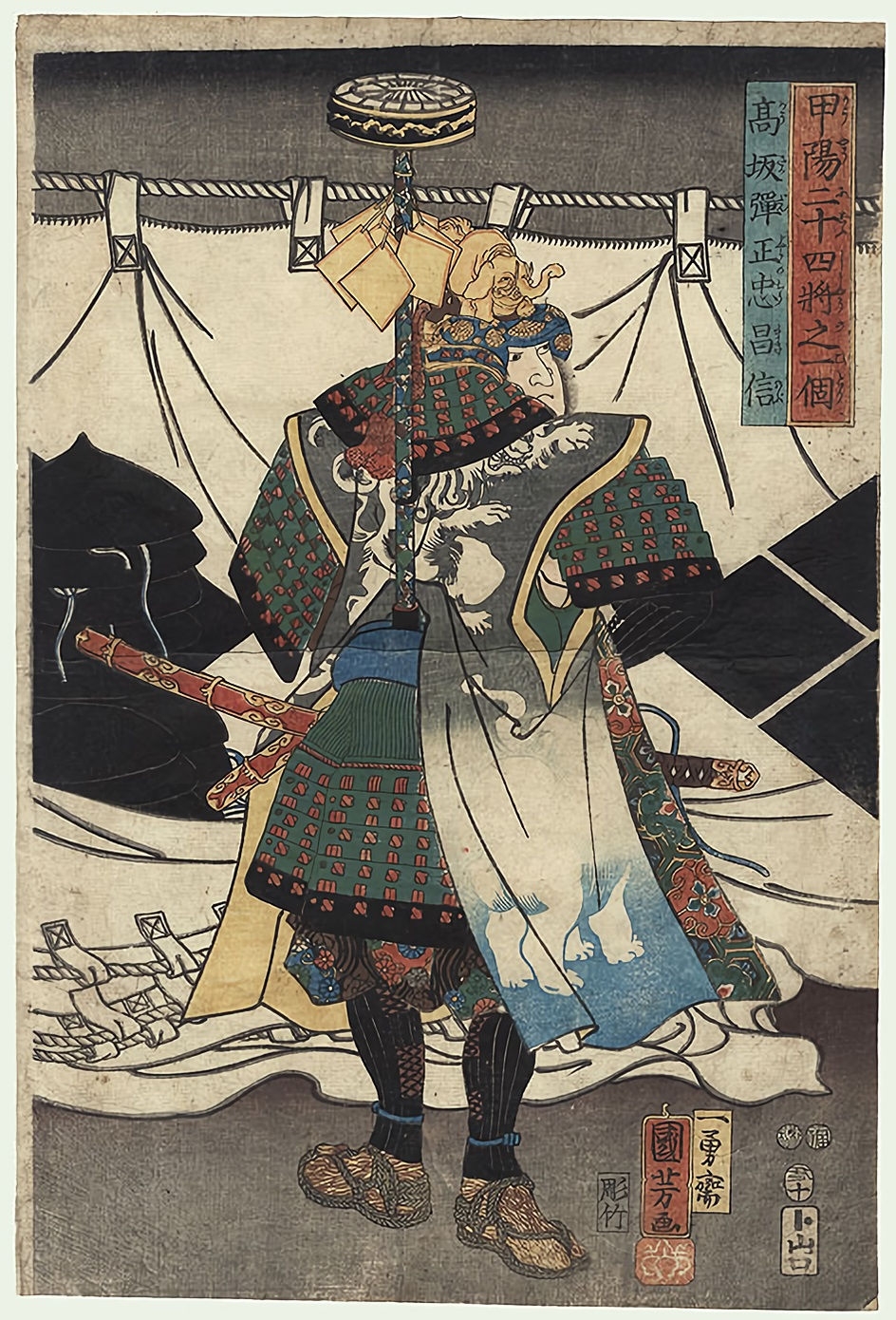
Kosaka Masanobu by Utagawa Kuniyoshi

The Kōyō Gunkan (甲陽軍鑑) is a record of the military exploits of the Takeda family, compiled largely by the Takeda vassal Kōsaka Danjō Masanobu, and completed in 1616 by Obata Kagenori. It provides some of the most detailed descriptions and statistics of warfare in the Sengoku period available today. The term Bushidō was first used in Kōyō Gunkan.

The chronicle describes each of the Takeda's major battles, chronicling not only strategy and tactics but the outcomes as well. It describes the Chinese matchlock arquebuses used at Uedahara in 1548, making that the first field battle in Japan to see the use of firearms. And the chronicle tells of the famous one-on-one skirmish fought by Takeda Shingen against Uesugi Kenshin at the fourth battle of Kawanakajima in 1561. Having broken through Takeda's forces, Uesugi Kenshin found his way to Shingen's command tent, where he engaged Shingen directly, slashing at him with his sword. Shingen deflected the attack with his iron war fan, and reached for his own sword. A Takeda retainer then speared Kenshin's horse, forcing him to retreat.

In one section, the chronicle gives a detailed breakdown of the entire Takeda army in 1573, counting everything from pages and banner bearers to kitchen staff, horse doctors, and finance commissioners. According to the document, the 33,736 members of the Takeda army included;

- 9,121 horsemen
- 18,242 followers for the horsemen
- 884 ashigaru (foot-soldiers) within the hatamoto shoyakunin (personal attendants to the lord)
- 5,489 other ashigaru

The detailed breakdown of the army also provides an interesting look into the hierarchy of retainers or allies within such a force.

The Heihō Okigusho, contained within the chronicle, and attributed to general Yamamoto Kansuke, is one of Japan's earliest treatises on martial arts, along with tactics and strategy. It provides practical advice towards the wielding of sword, spear, gun and bow for the individual warrior rather than for the strategy of an entire troop. Sections by Kosaka Masanobu express his views on the warrior code in relation to the connection between lord and vassal. He compares Shingen to the ideal lord, and contrasts him to his son Takeda Katsuyori, whose poor leadership quickly led to the downfall of the clan.
