= Kōsaka Masanobu =

Japanese Takeda retainer

- 高坂 昌信
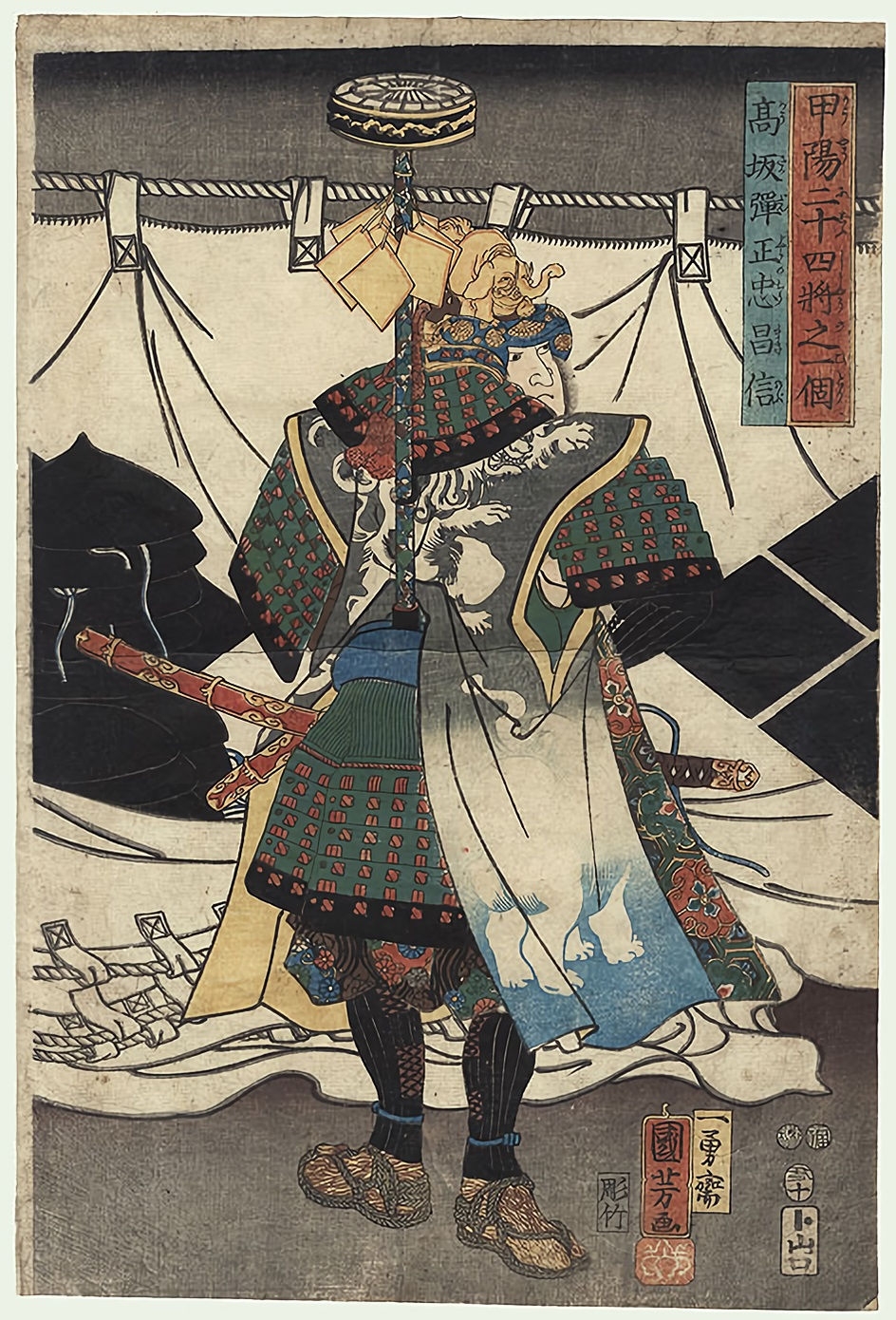
- Kōsaka Masanobu, ukiyo-e by Utagawa Kuniyoshi

Lord of Kaizu
- In office 1543–1578

Personal details
- Born: 1527
- Died: June 12, 1578 (aged 51)
- Nickname: "Kosaka Danjo"

Military service
- Allegiance: Takeda clan
- Commands: Kaizu castle
- Battles/wars: Shinano Campaign; Battles of Kawanakajima; Kozuke Campaign; Suruga Campaign; Odawara Campaign; Battle of Mikatagahara; Battle of Nagashino

Kōsaka Masanobu (高坂 昌信) also known as Kasuga Toratsuna (春日 虎綱; 1527 – June 12, 1578) was a Japanese samurai warrior of the Sengoku period. He was known as one of the "Twenty-Four Generals of Takeda Shingen". He is often credited as the original author of Kōyō Gunkan, which records the history of the Takeda family and their military tactics.

== Biography ==
Kōsaka is known as one of the three "Danjō" that served the Takeda family, along with Sanada Yukitaka and Hoshina Masatoshi (Danjō stands for a formal title, Danjōchū; 弾正忠). Among these three, Kōsaka was known as the "Nige Danjō" (逃げ弾正; literally, the fleeing Danjō), because of his cautious commanding and skillful retreats.

In 1561, as the general in command of Kaizu castle, Kōsaka played an important role in the fourth Battle of Kawanakajima. He informed Takeda via signal fires of the movements of Uesugi Kenshin's army as it approached, and then led the sneak attack up Saijo-yama in order to drive Uesugi's men down to the plain where they could be surprised by Takeda's army. Even though that tactic failed, Kōsaka led his men back down the hill, attacking Uesugi's army from the rear, turning the tide of the battle.

In 1575, he led troops to protect Takeda Katsuyori's rearguard at Battle of Nagashino when the latter had been forced to retreat by the Oda-Tokugawa alliance.

== Relationship with Shingen ==
The association between Masanobu and Shingen began in 1543 as a love relationship. At the time they were 16 and 22, respectively. Such relationships were in vogue in pre-modern Japan, a tradition known as shudo. The love pact signed by the two, in University of Tokyo's Historical Archive, documents Shingen's pledge that he was not in, nor had any intentions of entering into, a sexual relationship with a certain other retainer, and asserts that "since I want to be intimate with you" he will in no way harm the boy, and calls upon the gods to be his guarantors.

== Retirement and death ==
Kōsaka Masanobu is known to have openly criticized Katsuyori numerous times. Because of this, Kosaka was forced to "retire" from service in 1578 and died later from illness.
