= List of cities in Yamaguchi Prefecture by population =

The following list sorts all cities (including towns) in the Japanese prefecture of Yamaguchi with a population of more than 5,000 according to the 2020 Census. As of October 1, 2020, 17 places fulfill this criterion and are listed here. This list refers only to the population of individual cities, towns and villages within their defined limits, which does not include other municipalities or suburban areas within urban agglomerations.

== List ==
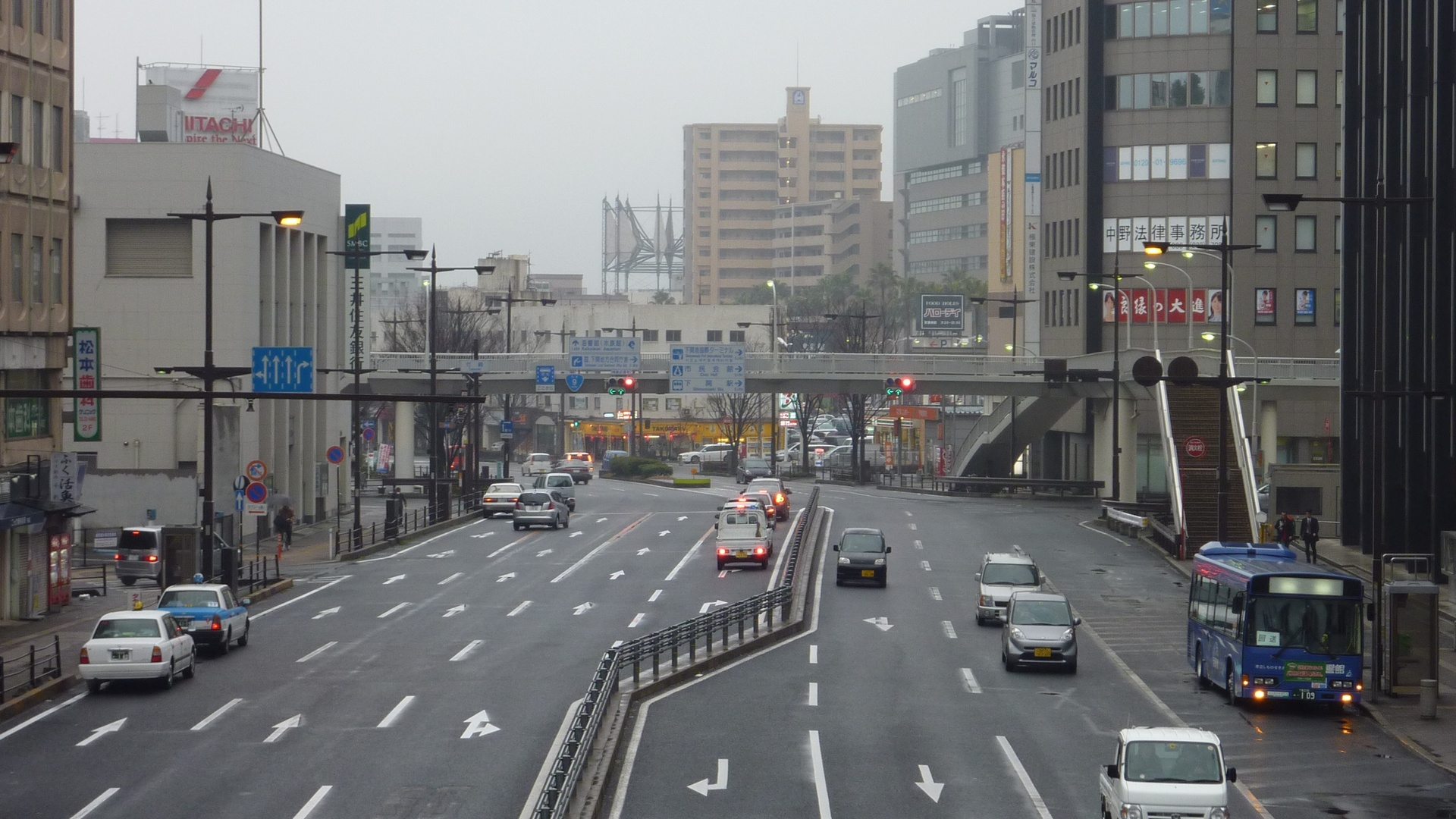
Shimonoseki

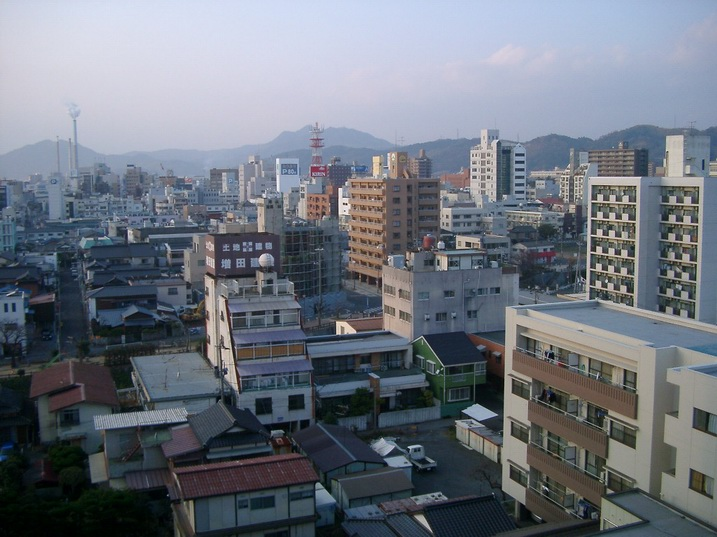
Shunan

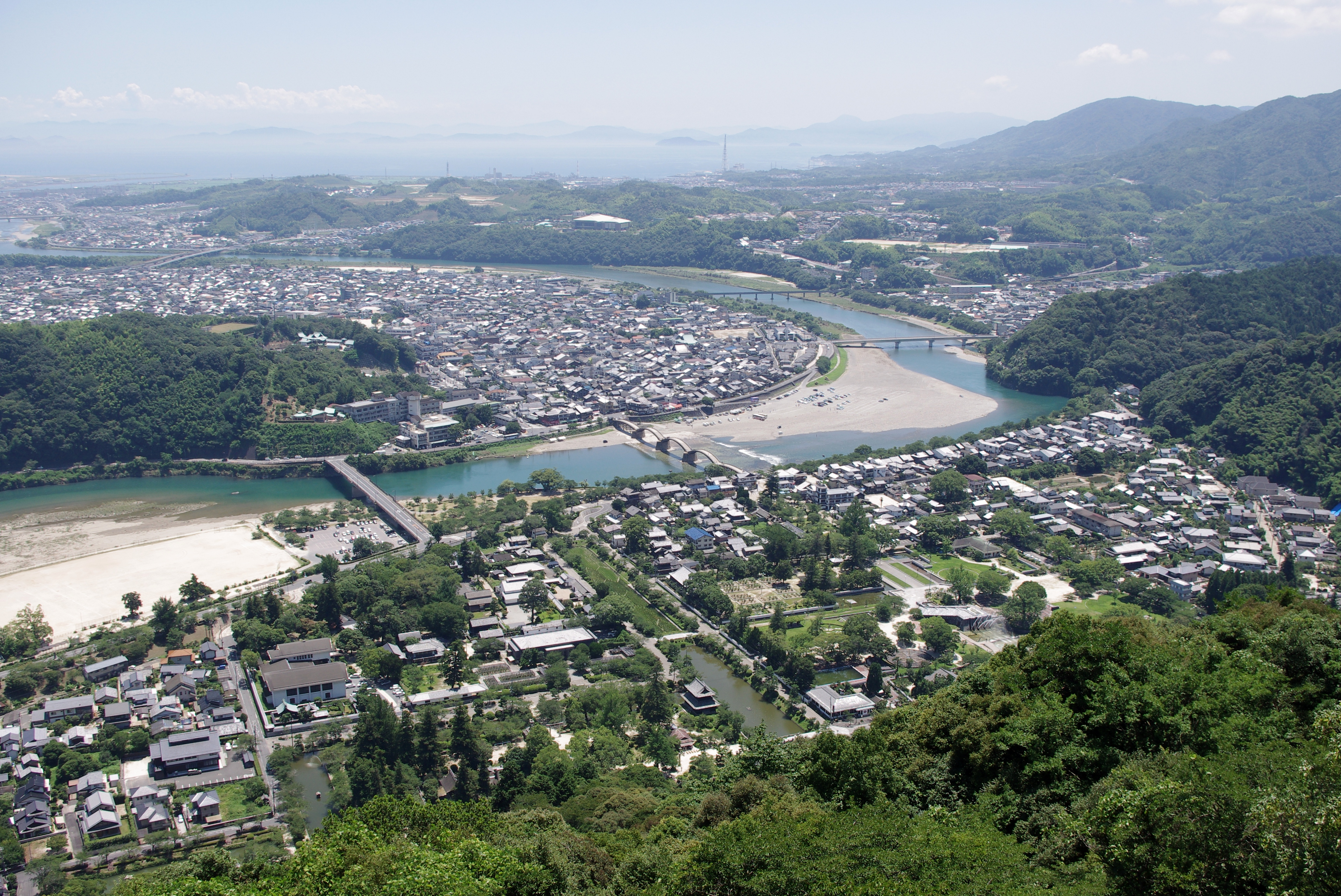
Iwakuni

The following table lists the 17 cities and towns in Yamaguchi with a population of at least 5,000 on October 1, 2020, according to the 2020 Census. The table also gives an overview of the evolution of the population since the 1995 census.

Rank (2020)	Name	Status	2020	2015	2010	2005	2000	1995
1	Shimonoseki	City	255,199	268,517	280,947	290,693	301,097	310,717
2	Yamaguchi	City	194,110	197,422	196,628	199,297	197,115	193,172
3	Ube	City	162,707	169,429	173,772	178,955	182,031	182,771
4	Shūnan	City	137,607	144,842	149,487	152,387	157,383	161,562
5	Iwakuni	City	129,226	136,757	143,857	149,702	153,985	156,347
6	Hōfu	City	114,038	115,942	116,611	116,818	117,724	118,803
7	San'yō-Onoda	City	60,367	62,671	64,550	66,261	67,429	68,745
8	Kudamatsu	City	55,960	55,812	55,012	53,509	53,101	53,471
9	Hikari	City	49,821	51,369	53,004	53,971	54,680	55,408
10	Hagi	City	44,661	49,560	53,747	57,990	61,745	65,293
11	Nagato	City	32,537	35,439	38,349	41,127	43,473	45,565
12	Yanai	City	30,821	32,945	34,730	35,927	37,251	38,963
13	Mine	City	23,267	26,159	28,630	29,839	31,546	32,396
14	Suō-Ōshima	Town	14,810	17,199	19,084	21,392	23,013	24,795
15	Tabuse	Town	14,498	15,317	15,986	16,287	16,217	16,203
16	Hirao	Town	11,921	12,798	13,491	14,203	14,580	14,618
17	Waki	Town	6,036	6,285	6,378	6,441	6,732	6,959
