= Waki Station =

Railway station in Waki, Yamaguchi Prefecture, Japan

Waki Station 和木駅
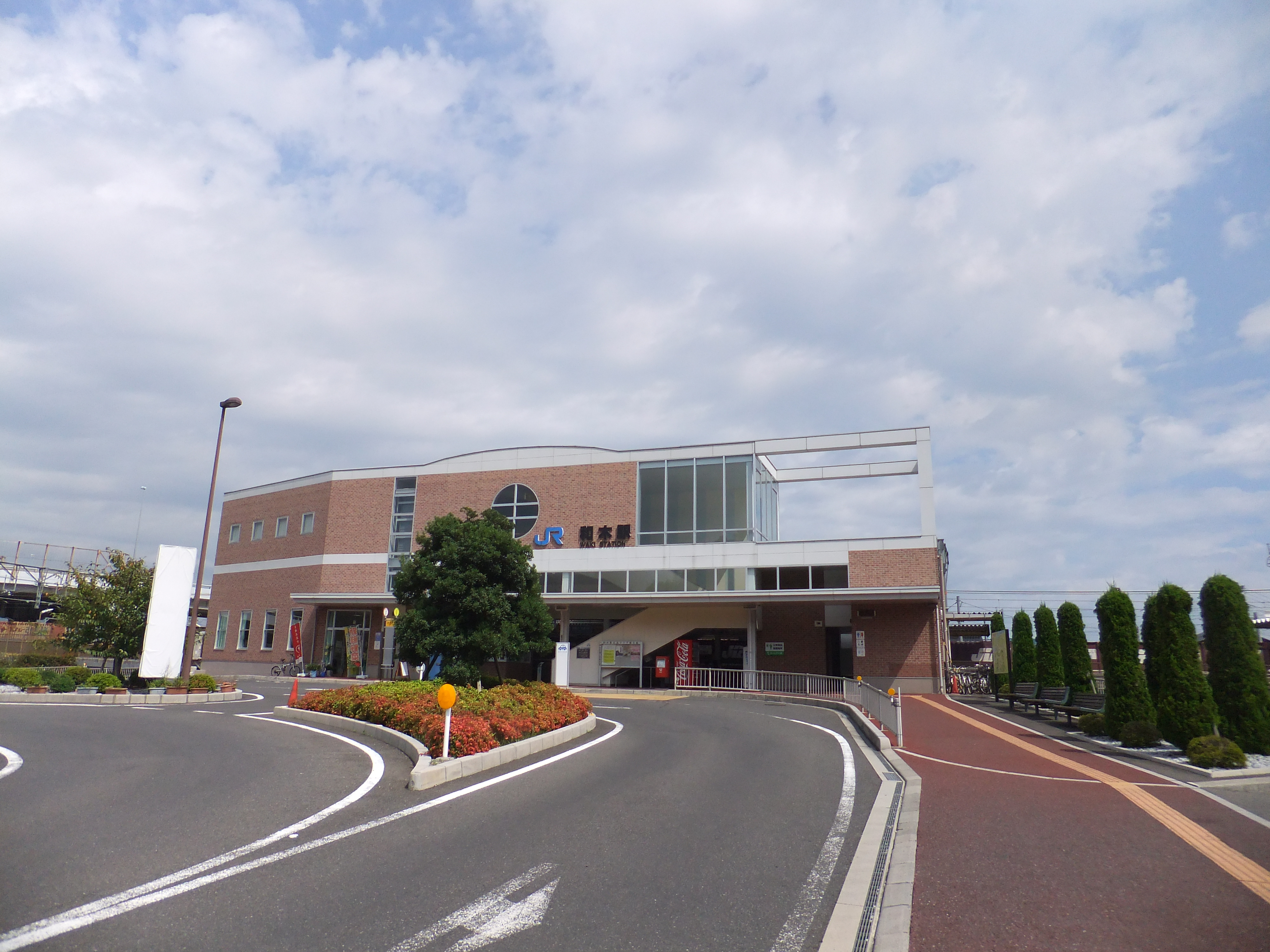
- Waki Station in September 2014

General information
- Location: 4-chōme-1 Waki-cho, Kuga-gun, Yamaguchi-ken 740-0061; Japan
- Coordinates: 34°12′14.89″N 132°13′39.49″E
- Owner: West Japan Railway Company
- Operator: West Japan Railway Company
- Line: R Sanyō Main Line
- Distance: 342.3 km (212.7 miles) from Kobe
- Platforms: 2 side platforms
- Tracks: 2
- Connections: Bus stop

Construction
- Accessible: Yes

Other information
- Status: Staffed
- Station code: JR-R15
- Website: Official website

History
- Opened: 15 March 2008; 18 years ago

Passengers
- FY2022: 868

Services
Preceding station	JR West	Following station
Iwakuni Terminus	San'yō Line Local	Ōtake towards Hiroshima
Location
- Location within Yamaguchi Prefecture Location within Japan

Waki Station (和木駅, Waki-eki) is a passenger railway station located in the town of Waki, Kuga District, Yamaguchi Prefecture, Japan. It is operated by the West Japan Railway Company (JR West).

== Lines ==
Waki Station is served by the JR West Sanyō Main Line, and is located 342.3 kilometers from the terminus of the line at Kobe.

== Station layout ==
The station consists of two opposed side platforms connected by a footbridge. The southern end of the platform extends 25 meters across the border into Iwakuni city. It has two entrances, the west exit (towards Waki town office) and the east exit (towards National Route 2). The station is staffed.

== Platforms ==
1	■ R Sanyō Main Line	for Miyajimaguchi and Hiroshima
2	■ R Sanyō Main Line	for Iwakuni and Tokuyama

== History ==
Waki Station was opened on 15 March 2008.

== Passenger statistics ==
In fiscal 2022, the station was used by an average of 868 passengers daily.

== Surrounding area ==
- Waki Town Hall
- Waki Municipal Waki Junior High School
- Mitsui Chemicals Iwakuni Plant
- ENEOS Marifu Refinery
- Japan National Route 2

== See also ==
- List of railway stations in Japan
