= Miyauchi-Kushido Station =

Railway station in Hatsukaichi, Hiroshima Prefecture, Japan

Miyauchi-Kushido Station 宮内串戸駅
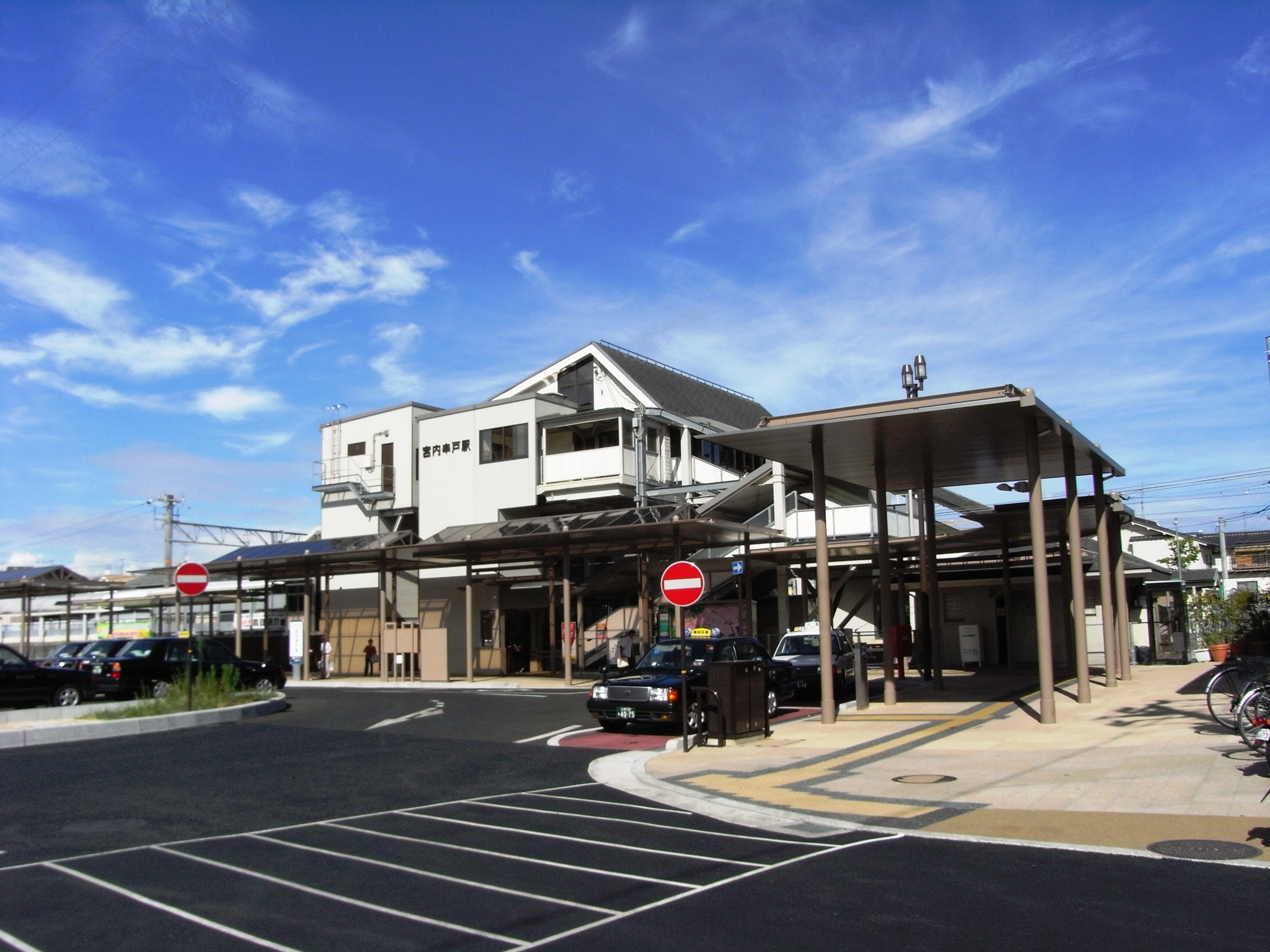
- Miyauchi-Kushido Station in August 2008

General information
- Location: 3-chōme-7 Kushido, Hatsukaichi-shi, Hiroshima-ken 738-0033; Japan
- Coordinates: 34°20′52.59″N 132°19′25.34″E
- Owner: West Japan Railway Company
- Operator: West Japan Railway Company
- Line: R Sanyō Main Line
- Distance: 321.8 km (200.0 miles) from Kobe
- Platforms: 2 side platforms
- Tracks: 2
- Connections: Miyajima Line at Hiroden Miyauchi Station

Construction
- Accessible: Yes

Other information
- Status: Staffed
- Station code: JR-R08
- Website: Official website

History
- Opened: 3 April 1988; 38 years ago

Passengers
- FY2019: 4807

Services
Preceding station	JR West	Following station
Miyajimaguchi towards Iwakuni	San'yō Line Rapid	Itsukaichi towards Hiroshima
Ajina towards Iwakuni	San'yō Line Local	Hatsukaichi towards Hiroshima
Location
- Location within Hiroshima Prefecture Location within Japan

Miyauchi-Kushido Station (宮内串戸駅, Miyauchi-Kushido-eki) is a passenger railway station located in the city of Hatsukaichi, Hiroshima Prefecture, Japan. It is operated by the West Japan Railway Company (JR West).

== Lines ==
Miyauchi-Kushido Station is served by the JR West Sanyō Main Line, and is located 321.8 kilometers from the terminus of the line at Kobe.

== Station layout ==
The station consists of two opposed side platforms connected by an elevated station buildinge. The station is staffed.

== Platforms ==
1	■ R Sanyō Main Line	for Miyajimaguchi and Iwakuni
2	■ R Sanyō Main Line	for Hiroshima and Kure

== History ==
Miyauchi-Kushido Station opened on 3 April 1988.

== Passenger statistics ==
In fiscal 2019, the station was used by an average of 4807 passengers daily.

== Surrounding area ==
- Hatsukaichi City Hall
- Hiroden Miyauchi Station is located to the south from JR Miyauchi-Kushido Station, 3 minutes walk from the station.

=== Hiroden ===
█ Miyajima Line
Line #2

Hatsukaichi-shiyakusyo-mae (Hera) — Miyauchi — JA Hiroshimabyoin-mae

== See also ==
- List of railway stations in Japan
