= FM Hatsukaichi =

FM Hatsukaichi (JOZZ8AP-FM)
- Japan
- Broadcast area: Hatsukaichi/ Otake/ Saeki-ku, Hiroshima/ Nishi-ku, Hiroshima
- Frequency: 76.1 MHz

Programming
- Format: News/Talk/Music

History
- First air date: February 23, 2008

Technical information
- ERP: 20 watts

Links
- Website: http://www.761.jp/

FM Hatsukaichi (FMはつかいち) is a Japanese community FM radio station in Hatsukaichi, Hiroshima.

== Overview ==
The station received its broadcasting license on January 1, 2008, and went on the air on February 23, 2008, as the 16th community FM station in the Chūgoku region.

The radio broadcast can be received in Hatsukaichi, Otake, Etajima, Kaita, Saka and western areas of Kure.

== Hours ==
Its broadcast hours are from 7 a.m. to 10 p.m. (24 hours a day if a disaster occurs in the area).

== Community card ==
The station offered community card "Club FM Hatsukaichi" for listeners to use local shops and get information of their events.

== Magazine ==
The station also publish local magazine "Club FM Hatsukaichu Radio magazine".
