= Kuba Station =

Railway station in Ōtake, Hiroshima Prefecture, Japan

Kuba Station 玖波駅
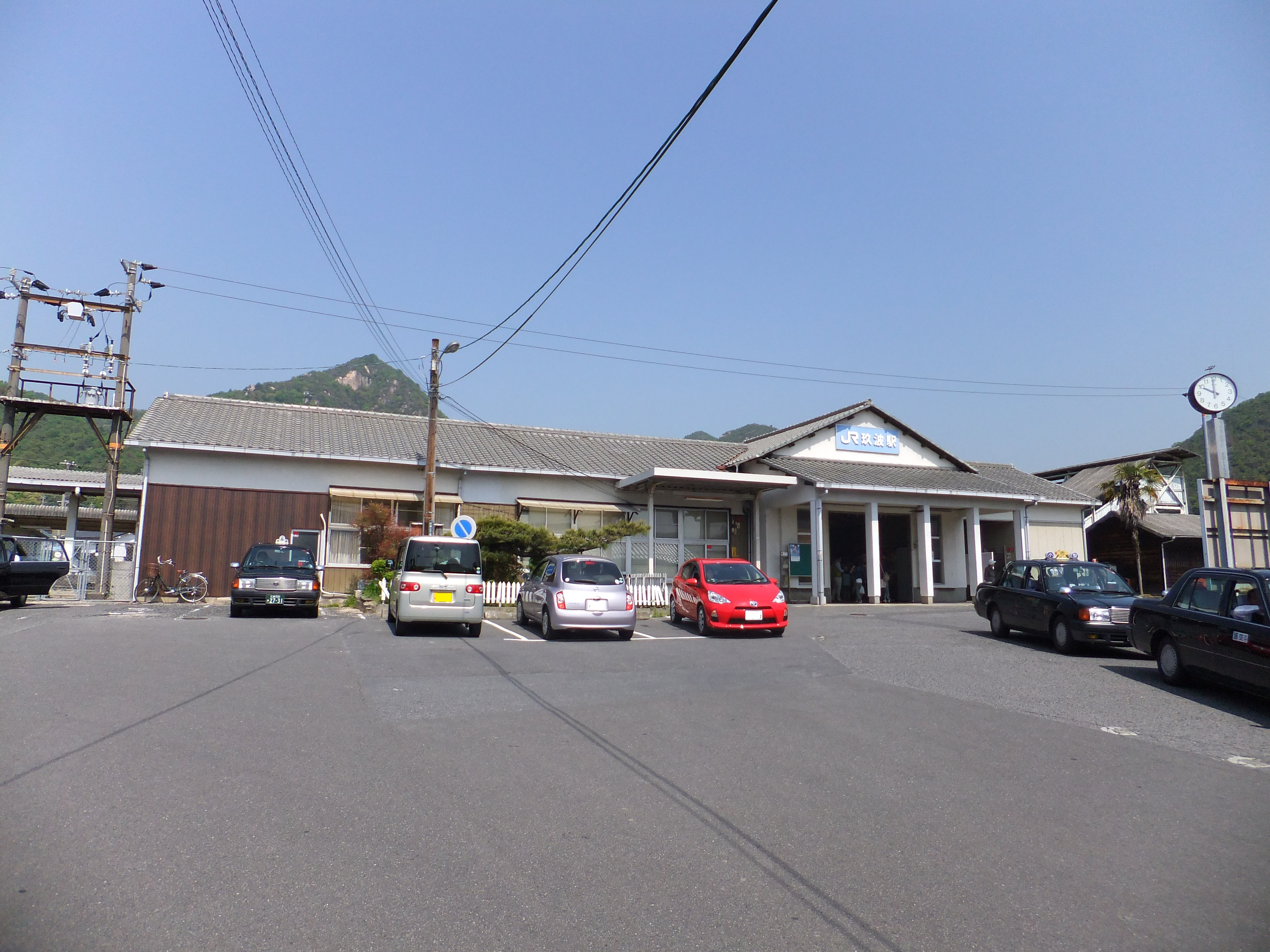
- Kuba Station in May 2012

General information
- Location: 2 Chome-1-1 Kuba, Ōtake-shi, Hiroshima-ken 739-0651; Japan
- Coordinates: 34°15′17.95″N 132°13′40.53″E
- Owner: West Japan Railway Company
- Operator: West Japan Railway Company
- Line: R Sanyō Main Line
- Distance: 336.4 km (209.0 miles) from Kobe
- Platforms: 2 side platforms
- Tracks: 2
- Connections: Bus stop

Construction
- Accessible: Yes

Other information
- Status: Staffed
- Station code: JR-R13
- Website: Official website

History
- Opened: 25 September 1897; 128 years ago

Passengers
- FY2019: 1700

Services
Preceding station	JR West	Following station
Ōtake towards Iwakuni	San'yō Line City Liner	Ōnoura towards Hiroshima
Ōtake towards Iwakuni	San'yō Line Local	Ōnoura towards Hiroshima
Location
- Location within Hiroshima Prefecture Location within Japan

Kuba Station (玖波駅, Kuba-eki) is a passenger railway station located in the city of Ōtake, Hiroshima Prefecture, Japan. It is operated by the West Japan Railway Company (JR West).

== Lines ==
Kuba Station is served by the JR West Sanyō Main Line, and is located 336.4 kilometers from the terminus of the line at Kobe.

== Station layout ==
The station consists of two opposed side platforms connected by a footbridge. The station is staffed.

== Platforms ==
1	■ R Sanyō Main Line	for Iwakuni and Tokuyama
2	■ R Sanyō Main Line	for Miyajimaguchi and Hiroshima

== History ==
Kuba Station was opened on 25 September 1897 as a passenger and freight station on the San'yo Railway with the opening of the line from Hiroshima to Tokuyama. The line was nationalized in 1906 and became the San'yo Main Line in 1909. Freight operations were abandoned in 1962. With the privatization of the Japan National Railway (JNR) on 1 April 1987, the station came under the aegis of the West Japan railway Company (JR West).

== Passenger statistics ==
In fiscal 2019, the station was used by an average of 1700 passengers daily.

== Surrounding area ==
- Japan National Route 2

== See also ==
- List of railway stations in Japan
