= Ōnoura Station =

Railway station in Hatsukaichi, Hiroshima Prefecture, Japan

Ōnoura Station 大野浦駅
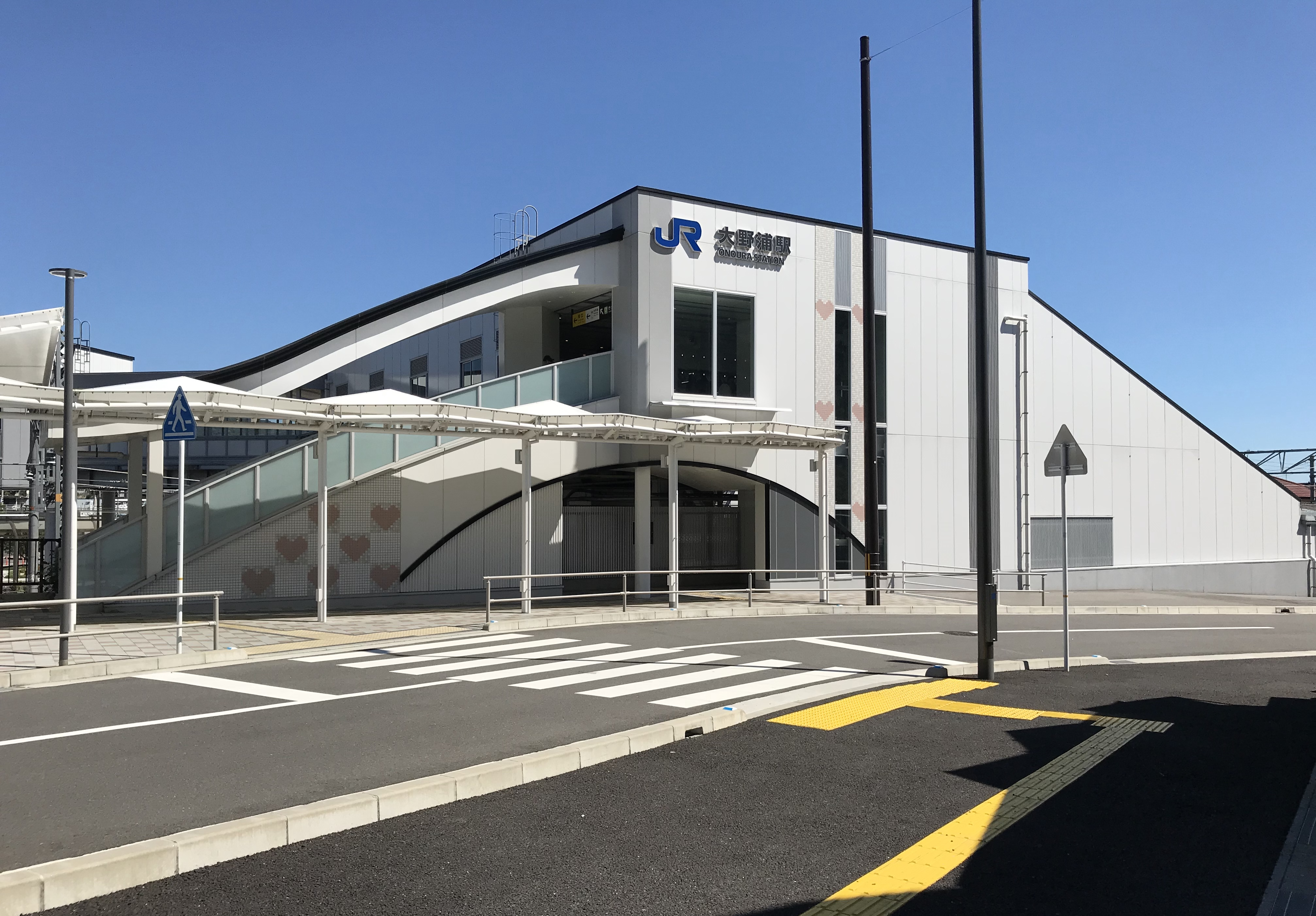
- Ōnoura north station building in August 2020

General information
- Location: 1-chōme-1 Shioya, Hatsukaichi-shi, Hiroshima-ken 739-0445; Japan
- Coordinates: 34°17′5.41″N 132°15′56.05″E
- Owner: West Japan Railway Company
- Operator: West Japan Railway Company
- Line: R Sanyō Main Line
- Distance: 331.4 km (205.9 miles) from Kobe
- Platforms: 1 side+ 1 island platform
- Tracks: 3
- Connections: Bus stop

Construction
- Accessible: Yes

Other information
- Status: Staffed (Midori no Madoguchi )
- Station code: JR-R12
- Website: Official website

History
- Opened: 16 March 1919; 107 years ago

Passengers
- FY2019: 1769

Services
Preceding station	JR West	Following station
Kuba towards Iwakuni	San'yō Line City Liner	Miyajimaguchi towards Hiroshima
Kuba towards Iwakuni	San'yō Line Local	Maezora towards Hiroshima
Location
- Location within Hiroshima Prefecture Location within Japan

Ōnoura Station (大野浦駅, Ōnoura-eki) is a passenger railway station located in the city of Hatsukaichi, Hiroshima Prefecture, Japan. It is operated by the West Japan Railway Company (JR West).

== Lines ==
Ōnoura Station is served by the JR West Sanyō Main Line, and is located 331.4 kilometers from the terminus of the line at Kobe.

== Station layout ==
The station consists of one ground-level side platform and one island platform. The station building is located on the side of Platform 1, and is connected to the island platform by a footbridge. The station had a Midori no Madoguchi staffed ticket office until 2023.

== Platforms ==
1, 2	■ R Sanyō Main Line	for Miyajimaguchi and Hiroshima
3	■ R Sanyō Main Line	for Iwakuni and Tokuyama

== History ==
Ōnoura Station was opened as the Ōnoura Signal Stop on 13 July 1917, and elevated to a full passenger station on 16 March 1919. With the privatization of the Japan National Railway (JNR) on 1 April 1987, the station came under the aegis of the West Japan railway Company (JR West).

== Passenger statistics ==
In fiscal 2019, the station was used by an average of 1769 passengers daily.

== Surrounding area ==
- Japan National Route 2

== See also ==
- List of railway stations in Japan
