= Miyauchi Station (Hiroshima) =

Railway station in Hatsukaichi, Hiroshima prefecture, Japan

Coordinates: 34°20′51″N 132°19′31″E

Miyauchi 宮内
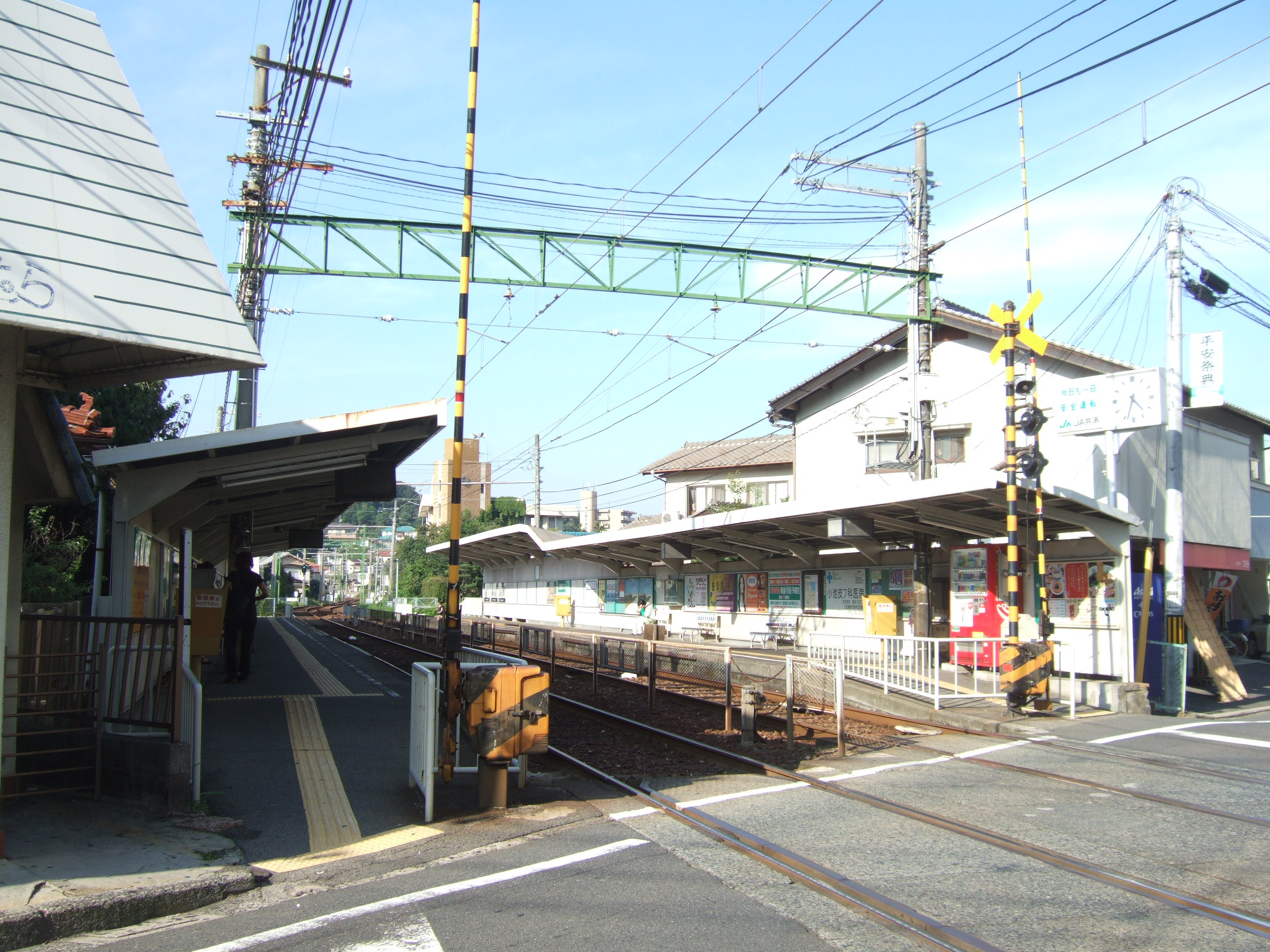
- The station in August 2009

General information
- Location: 2-230-3, Kushido, Hatsukaichi, Hiroshima; Japan
- Operator: Hiroshima Electric Railway
- Lines: Hiroden █ Miyajima Line; Route
- Connections: █ Sanyo Main Line at Miyauchikushido Station

Other information
- Station code: M34

History
- Opened: July 15, 1925
Location

Miyauchi is a Hiroden station on Hiroden Miyajima Line, located in Kushido, Hatsukaichi, Hiroshima.

== Routes ==
From Miyauchi Station, there is one of Hiroden Streetcar routes.

- Hiroshima Station - Hiroden-miyajima-guchi Route

== Connections ==
█ Miyajima Line

Hatsukaichi-shiyakusyo-mae (Hera) — Miyauchi — JA Hiroshimabyoin-mae

== Other services connections ==
=== JR lines ===
- JR lines connections at Miyauchikushido Station

Hiroden Miyauchi Station is located to the south from JR Miyauchikushido Station, 3 minutes walk from the station.

== Around station ==
- JR Miyauchikushido Station

== History ==
- Opened on July 15, 1925.
- Moved the present place in 1945.

== See also ==
- Hiroden lines and routes
