= Miyajimaguchi Station =

Railway station in Hatsukaichi, Hiroshima Prefecture, Japan

Miyajimaguchi Station 宮島口駅
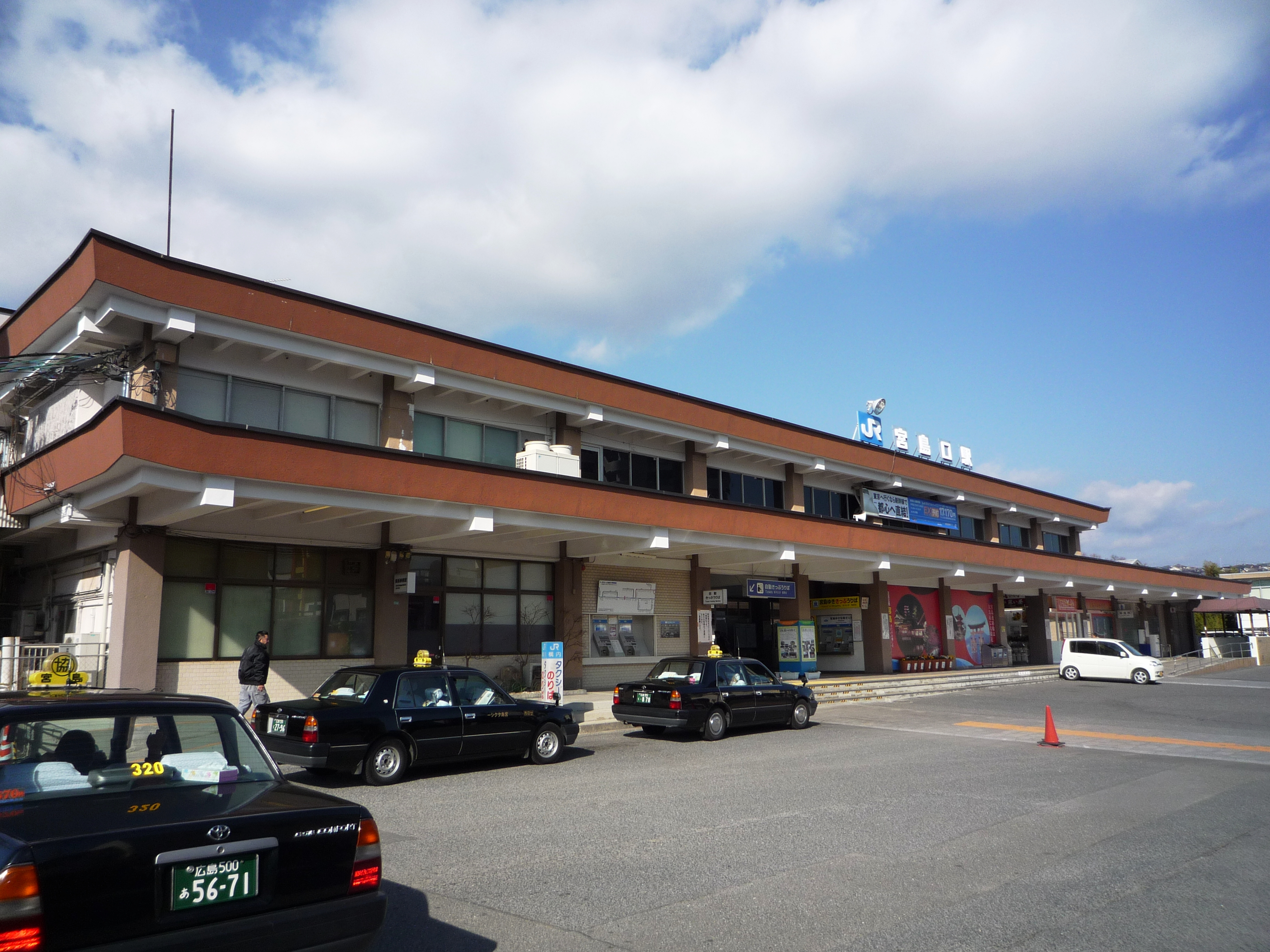
- Miyajimaguchi Station in January 2011

General information
- Location: 1 Chome-3-23 Miyajimaguchi, Hatsukaichi-shi, Hiroshima-ken 739-0411; Japan
- Coordinates: 34°18′43.32″N 132°18′10.67″E
- Owner: West Japan Railway Company
- Operator: West Japan Railway Company
- Line: R Sanyō Main Line
- Distance: 326.5 km (202.9 miles) from Kobe
- Platforms: 1 side+ 1 island platform
- Tracks: 3
- Connections: Bus stop

Construction
- Accessible: Yes

Other information
- Status: Staffed (Midori no Madoguchi )
- Station code: JR-R10
- Website: Official website

History
- Opened: 25 September 1897; 129 years ago
- Former names: Miyajima (to 1942)

Passengers
- FY2019: 4309

Services
Preceding station	JR West	Following station
Ōnoura towards Iwakuni	San'yō Line City Liner	Itsukaichi towards Hiroshima
Ōtake towards Iwakuni	San'yō Line Rapid	Miyauchi-Kushido towards Hiroshima
Maezora towards Iwakuni	San'yō Line Local	Ajina towards Hiroshima
Iwakuni towards Shimonoseki	San'yō Line West Express Ginga	Hiroshima towards Osaka
Location
- Location within Hiroshima Prefecture Location within Japan

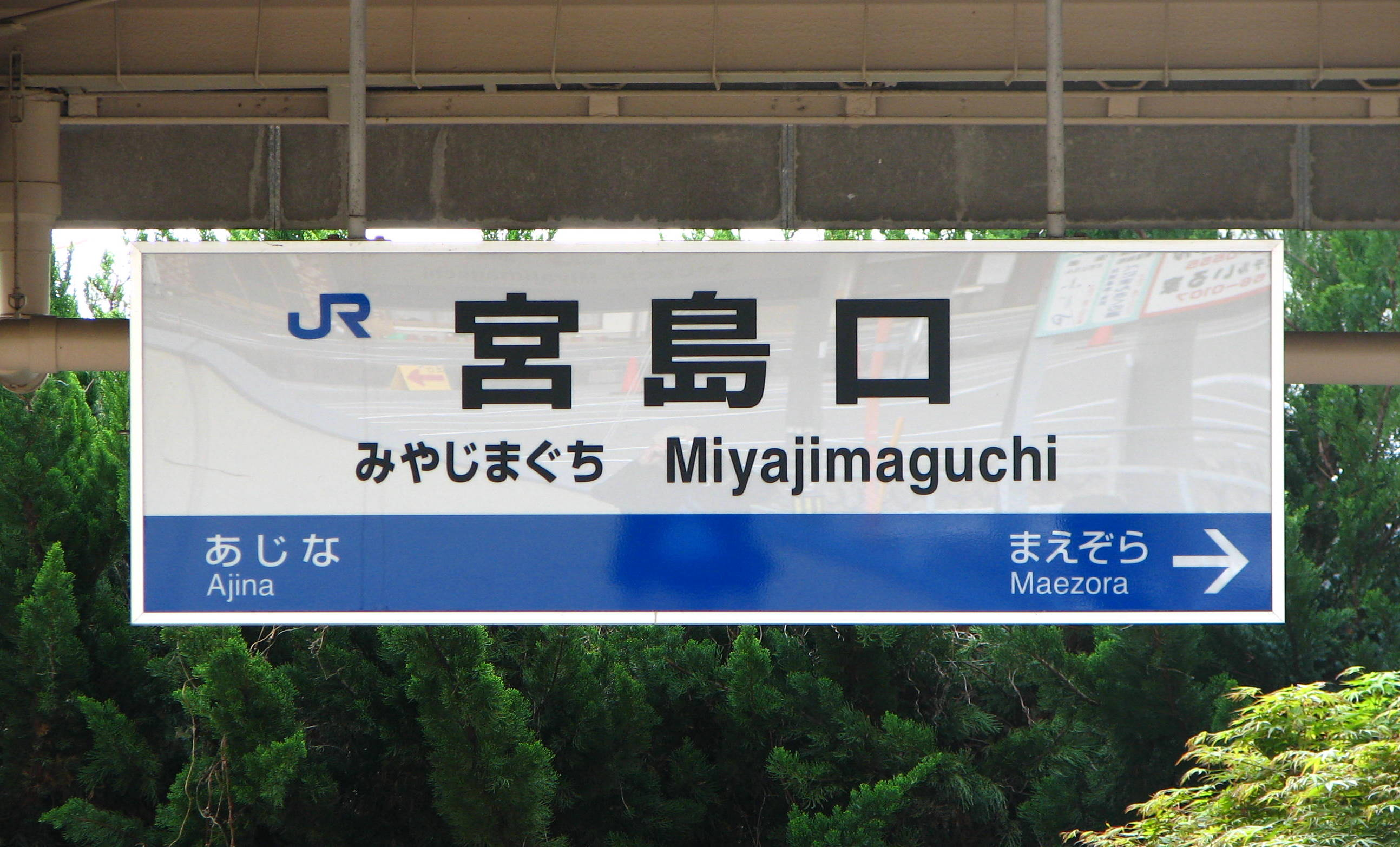
Miyajimaguchi Station signboard

Miyajimaguchi Station (宮島口駅, Miyajimaguchi-eki) is a passenger railway station located in the city of Hatsukaichi, Hiroshima Prefecture, Japan. It is operated by the West Japan Railway Company (JR West). From the pier near the station there are ferry services for Miyajima (Itsukushima) by JR Miyajima Ferry and Miyajima Matsudai Kisen.

== Lines ==
Miyajimaguchi Station is served by the JR West Sanyō Main Line, and is located 326.5 kilometers from the terminus of the line at Kobe.

== Station layout ==
The station consists of one ground-level side platform and one island platform. The station building is located on the side of Platform 1, and is connected to the island platform by a footbridge. The station has a Midori no Madoguchi staffed ticket office. The design of the station building imitates the torii gate of Itsukushima Shrine, and the color of the station building used to be vermilion during the JNR era, but changed from vermilion to brown after the establishment of JR West.

== Platforms ==
1	■ R Sanyō Main Line	for Iwakuni and Yanai
3, 4	■ R Sanyō Main Line	for Hiroshima and Mihara

== Ekiben ==
- "Anago-meshi", a box lunch, rice with kabayaki of congridae

== History ==
Miyajimaguchi Station was opened as Miyajima Station (宮島駅, Miyajima-eki) on 25 September 1897 on the San'yo Railway when the section from Hiroshima to Tokuyama was completed.The line was nationalized in 1906, and the line became the San'yo Main Line in 1909. The station was renamed on 1 April 1942. With the privatization of the Japan National Railway (JNR) on 1 April 1987, the station came under the aegis of the West Japan railway Company (JR West).

== Passenger statistics ==
In fiscal 2019, the station was used by an average of 4309 passengers daily.

== Surrounding area ==
- JR Miyajima Ferry
- Hiroden-miyajima-guchi Station is located to the south of JR Miyajimaguchi Station, about 2 minutes away by foot

=== Hiroden ===
█ Miyajima Line
Line #2

Hiroden-ajina — Hiroden-miyajima-guchi
Hiroden-ajina — (Kyoteijo-mae (temporary)) — Hiroden-miyajima-guchi

== See also ==
- List of railway stations in Japan
