= Ōtake, Hiroshima =

Ōtake 大竹市
- City
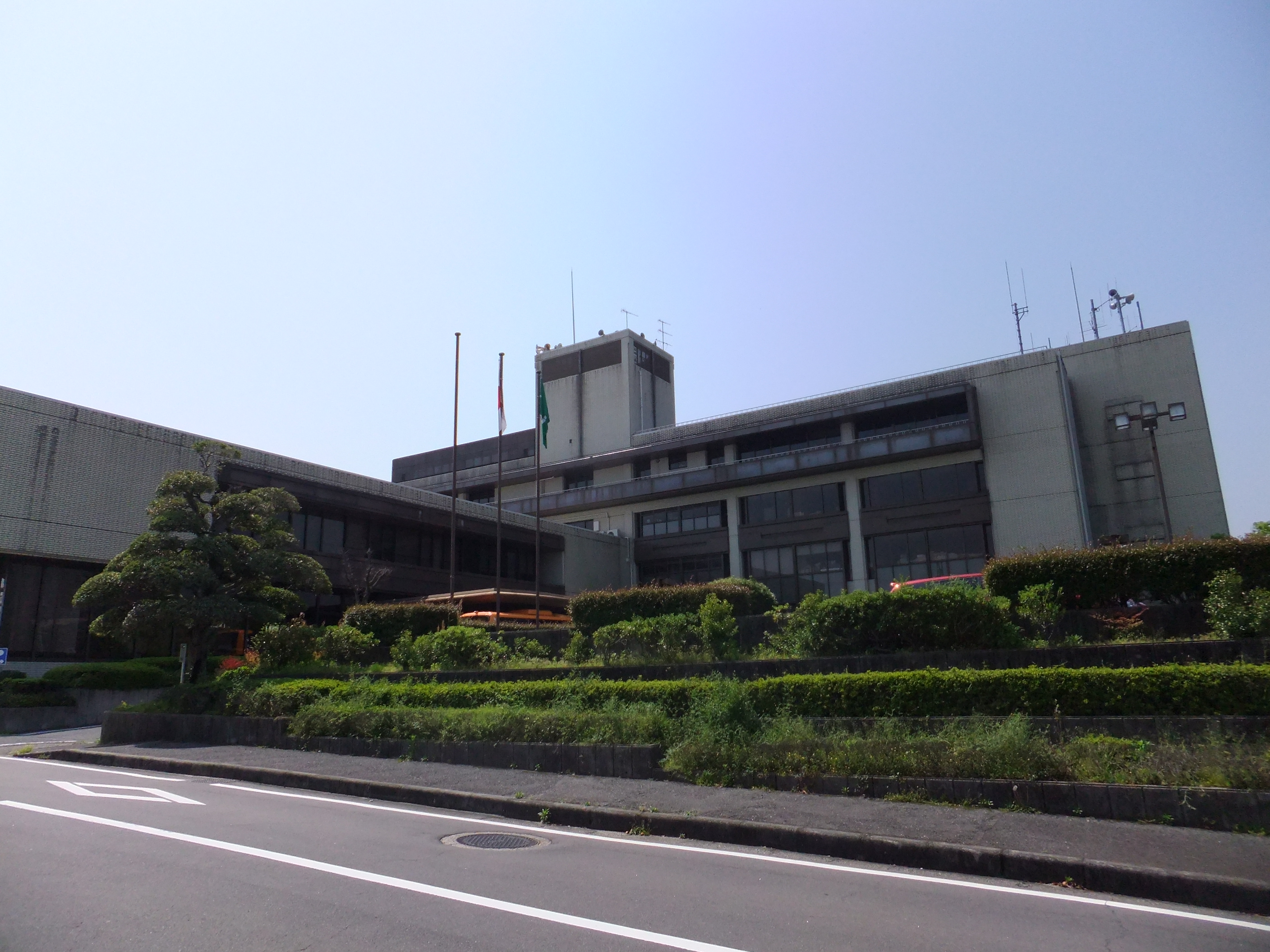
- Ōtake City Hall

- Flag Chapter
- Location of Ōtake in Hiroshima Prefecture

- Location in Japan
- Coordinates: 34°14′16″N 132°13′20″E
- Country: Japan
- Region: Chūgoku (San'yō)
- Prefecture: Hiroshima
- First official recorded: 6th century AD（official estimated）
- City settled: September 1, 1954

Government
  - Mayor: Hiromi Fukuda（福田弘美） - from June 2026

Area
  - Total: 78.66 km^{2} (30.37 sq mi)

Population (June 1, 2023)
  - Total: 25,955
  - Density: 330.0/km^{2} (854.6/sq mi)
- Time zone: UTC+09:00 (JST)
- City hall address: Ogata 1-11-1, Ōtake-shi, Hiroshima-ken 739-0692
- Climate: Cfa
- Website: Official website
- Symbols
- Flower: Rhododendron
- Tree: Round Leaf Holly

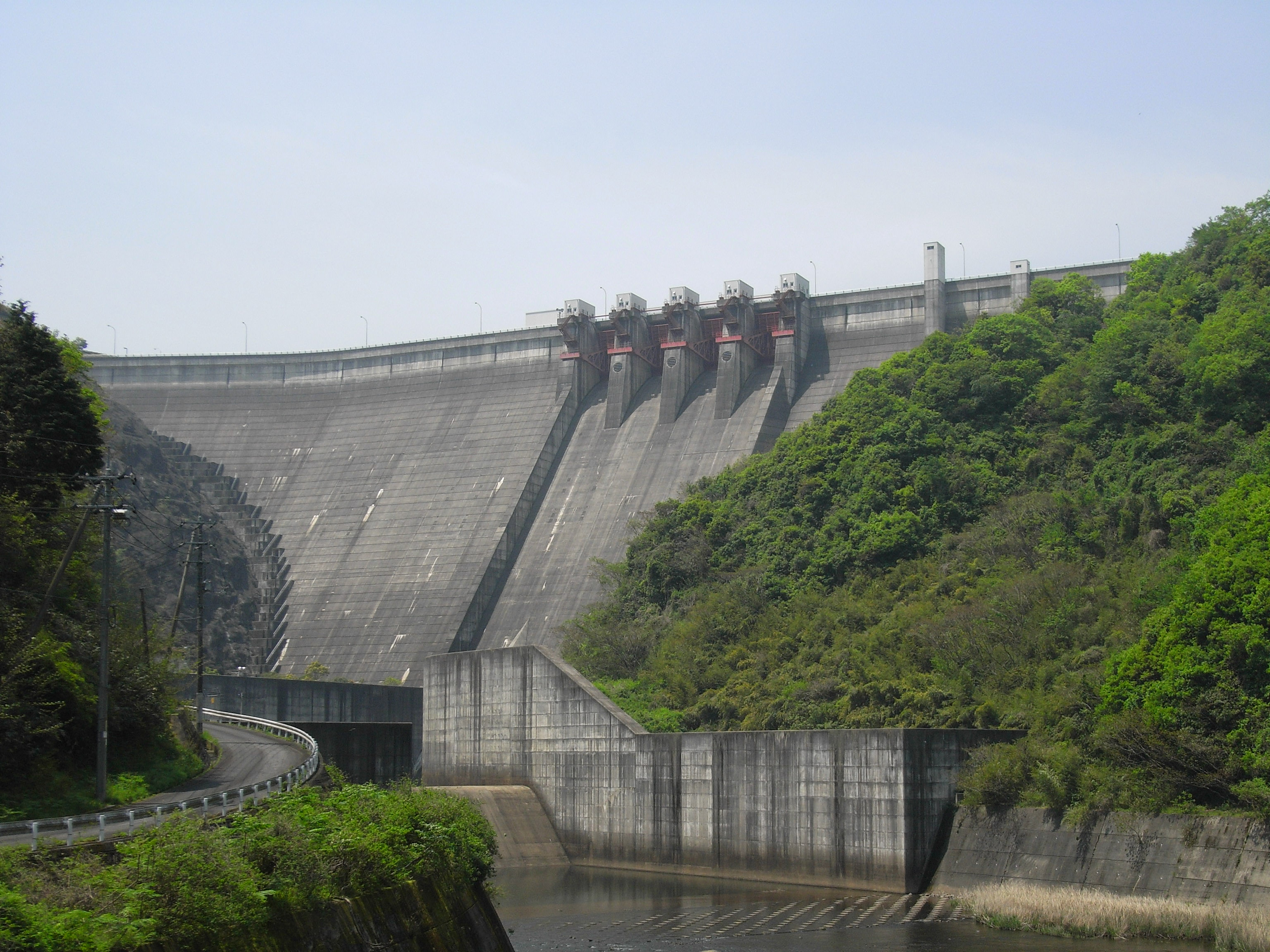
Yasaka Dam

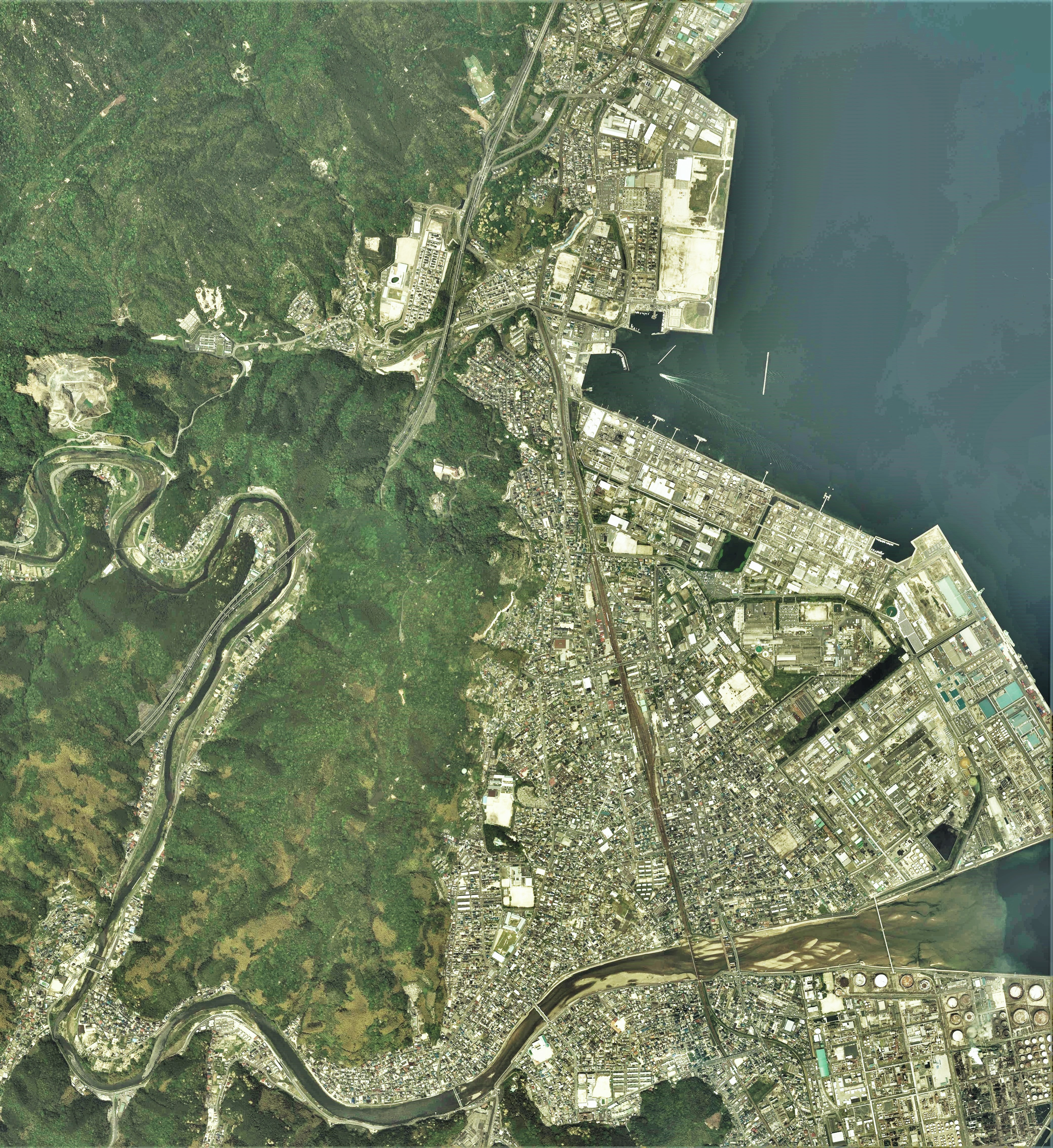
Aerial photo of Ōtake city center

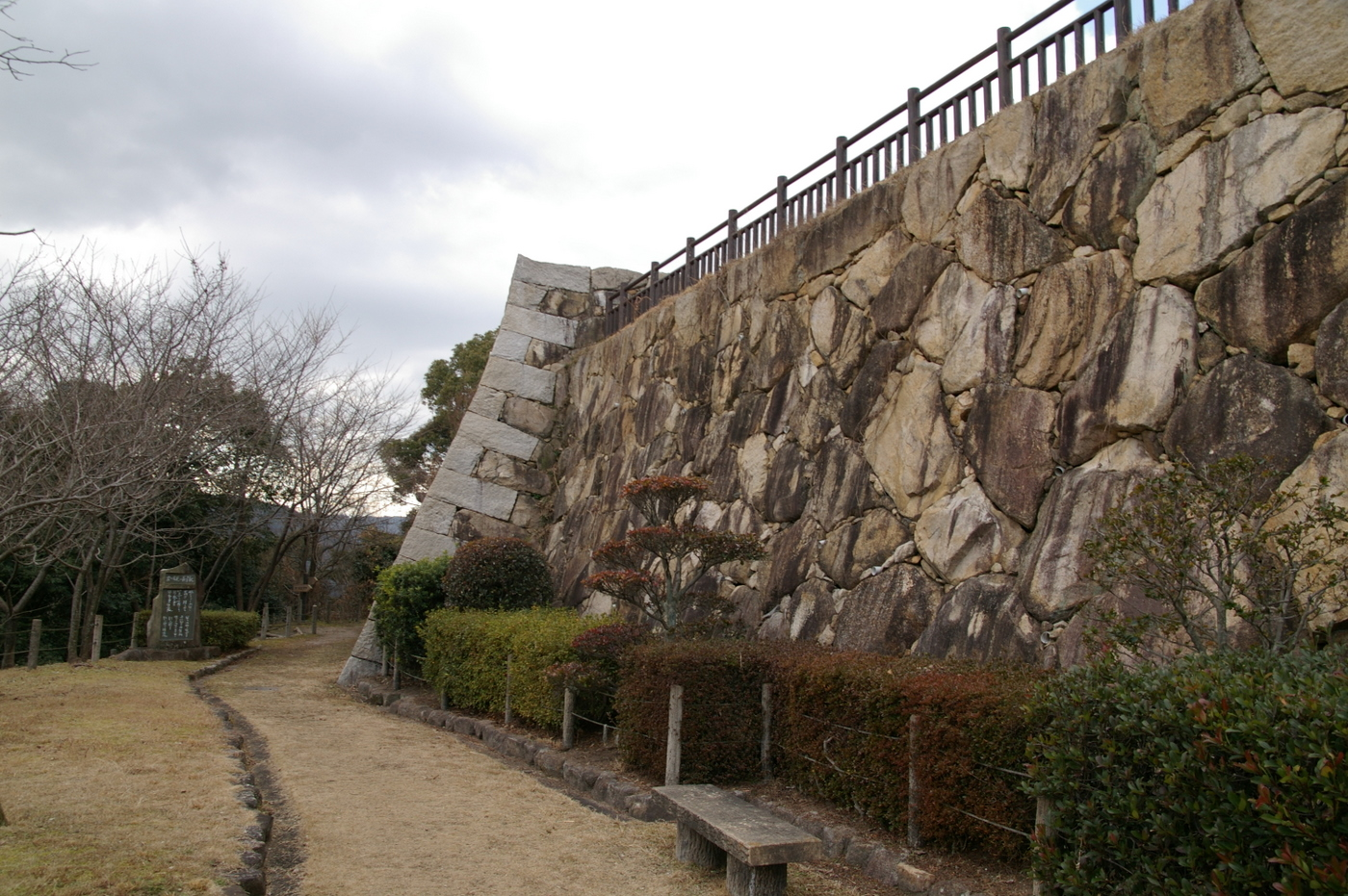
ruins of Kamei Castle

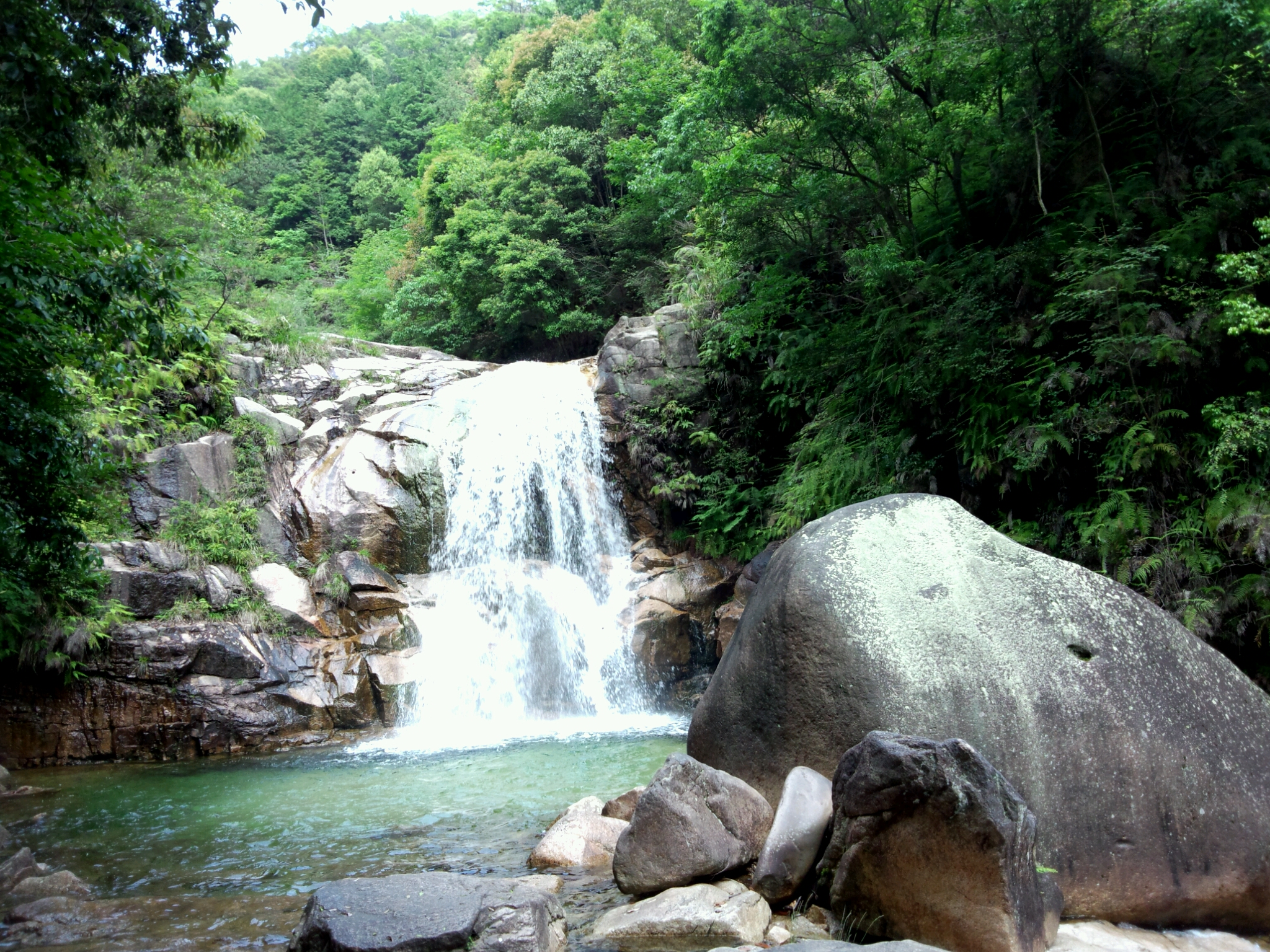
Kinryu Falls

Ōtake (大竹市, Ōtake-shi; Japanese pronunciation: [ò̞ó̞.tä́.ké̞(.ɕì), ó̞ó̞-]) is a city located in Hiroshima Prefecture, Japan. As of 1 June 2023, the city had an estimated population of 25,955 in 12884 households and a population density of 330 persons per km². The total area of the city is 78.66 square kilometres (30.37 sq mi).

== Geography ==
Ōtake is located on the border with Yamaguchi Prefecture in far southwestern Hiroshima Prefecture, and forms an integrated urban area with strong connections to Iwakuni, Yamaguchi. The city area has a gentle slope from the southwest to the northeast, and the geology is paleozoic strata and granite in the western mountains, and the urban area is sand and gravel. The urban area is surrounded by the Chugoku Mountains in the northwest, the Oze River in the south, and the Seto Inland Sea in the east, and develops into flat land along the coastline. With the exception of coastal urban areas, there are few flatlands and most of the city area is mountainous, with steep slopes approaching the coastline.

=== Adjoining municipalities ===
Hiroshima Prefecture

- Hatsukaichi

Yamaguchi Prefecture

- Iwakuni
- Waki

== Demographics ==
Per Japanese census data, the population of Ōtake in 2020 is 26,319 people. Ōtake has been conducting censuses since 1950.

Historical population
Year	Pop.	±%
1950	29,073	—
1955	32,782	+12.8%
1960	34,546	+5.4%
1965	38,145	+10.4%
1970	37,637	−1.3%
1975	38,457	+2.2%
1980	36,075	−6.2%
1985	34,760	−3.6%
1990	33,236	−4.4%
1995	32,850	−1.2%
2000	31,405	−4.4%
2005	30,279	−3.6%
2010	28,848	−4.7%
2015	27,865	−3.4%
2020	26,319	−5.5%
Ōtake population statistics

== Climate ==
Ōtake has a humid subtropical climate (Köppen climate classification Cfa) characterized by cool to mild winters and hot, humid summers. The average annual temperature in Ōtake is 16.3 °C (61.3 °F). The average annual rainfall is 1,694.6 mm (66.72 in) with July as the wettest month. The temperatures are highest on average in August, at around 28.1 °C (82.6 °F), and lowest in January, at around 5.3 °C (41.5 °F). The highest temperature ever recorded in Ōtake was 39.5 °C (103.1 °F) on 27 July 2026; the coldest temperature ever recorded was −7.5 °C (18.5 °F) on 26 February 1981.

Climate data for Ōtake (1991−2020 normals, extremes 1979−present)
Month	Jan	Feb	Mar	Apr	May	Jun	Jul	Aug	Sep	Oct	Nov	Dec	Year
Record high °C (°F)	17.4 (63.3)	22.0 (71.6)	26.3 (79.3)	31.0 (87.8)	32.0 (89.6)	35.1 (95.2)	39.5 (103.1)	38.6 (101.5)	36.4 (97.5)	32.2 (90.0)	26.8 (80.2)	21.4 (70.5)	39.5 (103.1)
Mean daily maximum °C (°F)	9.7 (49.5)	10.5 (50.9)	14.1 (57.4)	19.5 (67.1)	24.2 (75.6)	27.1 (80.8)	31.1 (88.0)	32.6 (90.7)	28.9 (84.0)	23.5 (74.3)	17.5 (63.5)	12.0 (53.6)	20.9 (69.6)
Daily mean °C (°F)	5.3 (41.5)	6.0 (42.8)	9.2 (48.6)	14.4 (57.9)	19.2 (66.6)	22.8 (73.0)	26.8 (80.2)	28.1 (82.6)	24.4 (75.9)	18.7 (65.7)	12.8 (55.0)	7.5 (45.5)	16.3 (61.3)
Mean daily minimum °C (°F)	1.5 (34.7)	1.9 (35.4)	4.6 (40.3)	9.6 (49.3)	14.6 (58.3)	19.2 (66.6)	23.5 (74.3)	24.6 (76.3)	20.7 (69.3)	14.4 (57.9)	8.6 (47.5)	3.6 (38.5)	12.2 (54.0)
Record low °C (°F)	−5.3 (22.5)	−7.5 (18.5)	−3.4 (25.9)	−0.4 (31.3)	4.6 (40.3)	10.5 (50.9)	15.7 (60.3)	17.3 (63.1)	8.6 (47.5)	2.9 (37.2)	0.1 (32.2)	−4.3 (24.3)	−7.5 (18.5)
Average precipitation mm (inches)	50.7 (2.00)	73.4 (2.89)	130.9 (5.15)	156.8 (6.17)	181.1 (7.13)	257.9 (10.15)	288.4 (11.35)	148.0 (5.83)	168.8 (6.65)	109.4 (4.31)	71.6 (2.82)	57.6 (2.27)	1,694.6 (66.72)
Average precipitation days (≥ 1.0 mm)	6.3	7.7	9.7	9.3	9.0	11.6	10.9	8.1	9.0	6.6	6.3	6.7	101.2
Mean monthly sunshine hours	153.5	151.7	183.9	196.3	215.6	156.7	177.0	213.0	165.8	177.6	160.2	155.2	2,104.3
Source: Japan Meteorological Agency

== History ==
The area of Ōtake was part of ancient Aki Province, and was on the route of the ancient San'yōdō highway. During the Muromachi period, it was largely the property of Itsukushima Shrine, coming under the control of the Mōri clan in the Sengoku period. After the start of the Edo Period, Fukushima Masanori built a Kamei Castle to defend against the Mōri, but was forced to dismantle it in 1611 by the Tokugawa shogunate. During the Bakumatsu period, the area became a battleground during the Chōshū expedition. Following the Meiji restoration, the village of Ōtake was established within Saeki District, Hiroshima on April 1, 1889 with the establishment of the modern municipalities system. It was raised to town status on January 1, 1911. In 1923, Shinkin Rayon, the predecessor of Mitsubishi Rayon (currently Mitsubishi Chemical) established a major factory in the town, and the Imperial Japanese Navy Naval Infantry established a diving school. In 1945, Ōtake was a major port of entry for Japanese who had been deported from the Empire of Japan's former overseas territories. On September 1, 1954 Otake Town merged with the towns of Ogata and Kuba Town, the village of Kuriya and a part of the village of Tomokazu to form the city of Ōtake.

== Government ==
Ōtake has a mayor-council form of government with a directly elected mayor and a unicameral city council of 16 members. Ōtake contributes one member to the Hiroshima Prefectural Assembly. In terms of national politics, the city is part of the Hiroshima 2nd district of the lower house of the Diet of Japan.

== Economy ==
Otake is the part of Seto Inland Sea industrial area, formed the first petrochemical industrial complex (kombinat) in Japan, The city is orientated towards heavy industry, with companies producing petroleum, pulp and paper, and chemical fibers. The city has little flat land suitable for agriculture.

- Mitsui Chemicals, Mitsubishi Rayon

== Education ==
Ōtake has two public elementary schools, two public junior high schools and one public combined elementary/middle schools operated by the city government, and one public high school operated by the Hiroshima Prefectural Board of Education. The prefecture also operates one special education school for the handicapped.

== Transportation ==
=== Railway ===
JR West (JR West) - San'yō Main Line

- Kuba - Ōtake

=== Highways ===
- Sanyō Expressway
- National Route 2
- National Route 186

== Sister cities ==
Otake has Sister City relationships with:

- Dujiangyan City, China

== Local attractions ==
- Atata Island Atata-jima
- Jyaku-iwa Jyaku-iwa
- Kamei Park Kamei Park
- Kinryu Park Kinryu Park
- Mount Mikura Mikura-dake
- Mount Mikura Campsite Mikura-dake campsite
- Yasaka Dam Yasaka-kyo
