= Maezora Station =

Railway station in Hatsukaichi, Hiroshima Prefecture, Japan

Maezora Station 前空駅
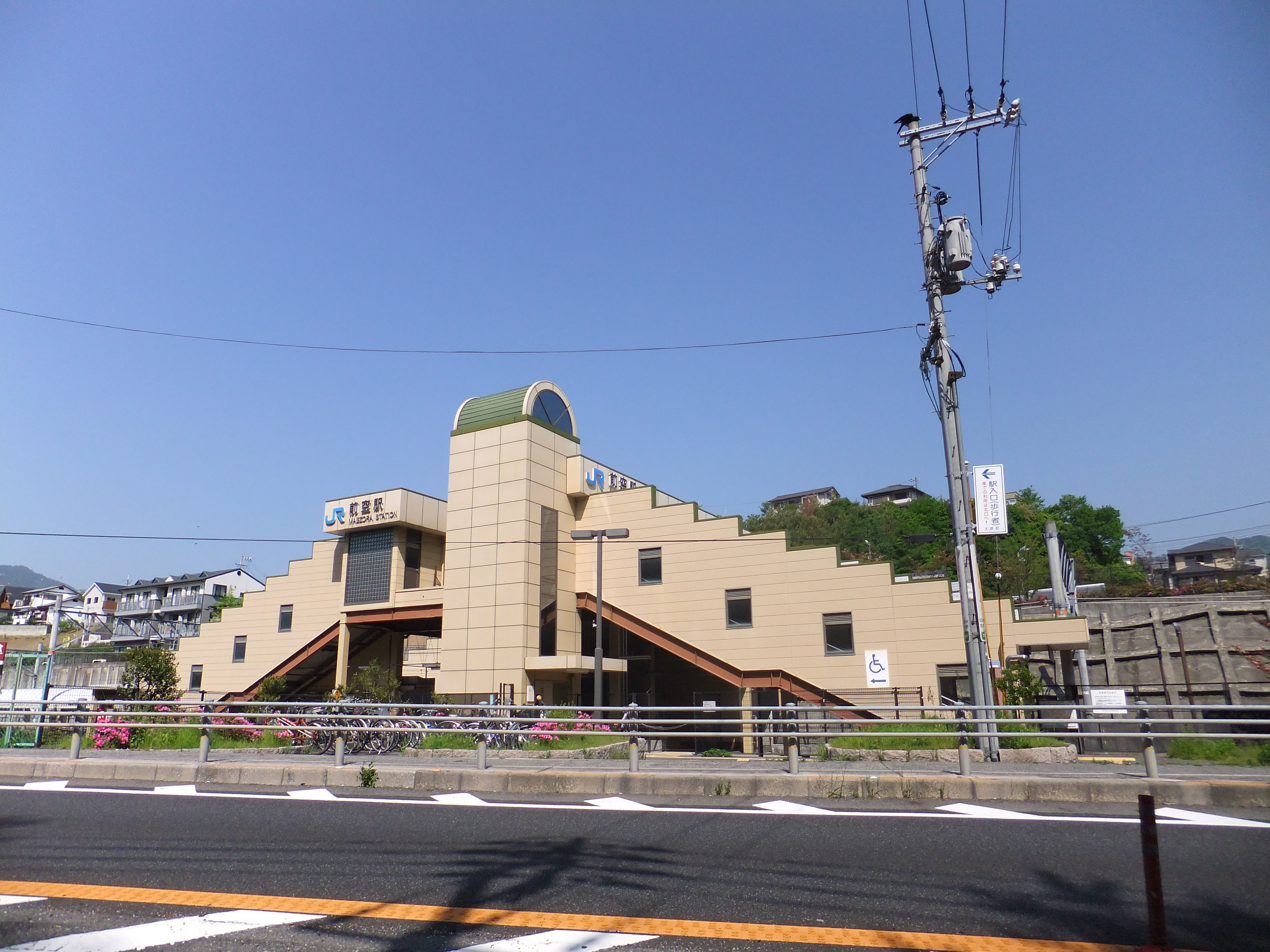
- Maezora Station in May 2012

General information
- Location: 5-chōme-1 Maezora, Hatsukaichi-shi, Hiroshima-ken 739-0424; Japan
- Coordinates: 34°18′3.7″N 132°17′21.9″E
- Owner: West Japan Railway Company
- Operator: West Japan Railway Company
- Line: R Sanyō Main Line
- Distance: 328.3 km (204.0 miles) from Kobe
- Platforms: 2 side platforms
- Tracks: 32
- Connections: Bus stop

Construction
- Accessible: Yes

Other information
- Status: Staffed (Midori no Madoguchi )
- Station code: JR-R11
- Website: Official website

History
- Opened: 11 March 2000; 26 years ago

Passengers
- FY2019: 2102

Services
| Preceding station | JR West | Following station |
|---|---|---|
| Ōnoura towards Iwakuni | San'yō Line Local | Miyajimaguchi towards Hiroshima |
Location
- Location within Hiroshima Prefecture Location within Japan

Maezora Station (前空駅, Maezora-eki) is a passenger railway station located in the city of Hatsukaichi, Hiroshima Prefecture, Japan. It is operated by the West Japan Railway Company (JR West).

== Lines ==
Maezora Station is served by the JR West Sanyō Main Line, and is located 328.3 kilometers from the terminus of the line at Kobe.

== Station layout ==
The station consists of two opposed side platforms connected by an elevated station building. The station used to have a Midori no Madoguchi till 2024.

== Platforms ==
| 1 | ■ R Sanyō Main Line | for Hiroshima, Seno and Mihara |
| 2 | ■ R Sanyō Main Line | for Iwakuni and Tokuyama |

== History ==
Maezora station opened on 11 March 2000.

== Passenger statistics ==
In fiscal 2019, the station was used by an average of 2102 passengers daily.

== Surrounding area ==
- Maezora Housing Complex
- Hiroshima Prefectural Miyajima Technical High School

== See also ==
- List of railway stations in Japan
