= Sanyo Women's College =

Sanyo college in Hiroshima

Coordinates: 34°21′46″N 132°20′33″E

Sanyo Women's College (山陽女子短期大学, Sanyō joshi tanki daigaku) is a private women's junior college in Hatsukaichi, Hiroshima, Japan, established in 1963.
