= Ōtake Station =

Railway station in Ōtake, Hiroshima Prefecture, Japan

Ōtake Station 大竹駅
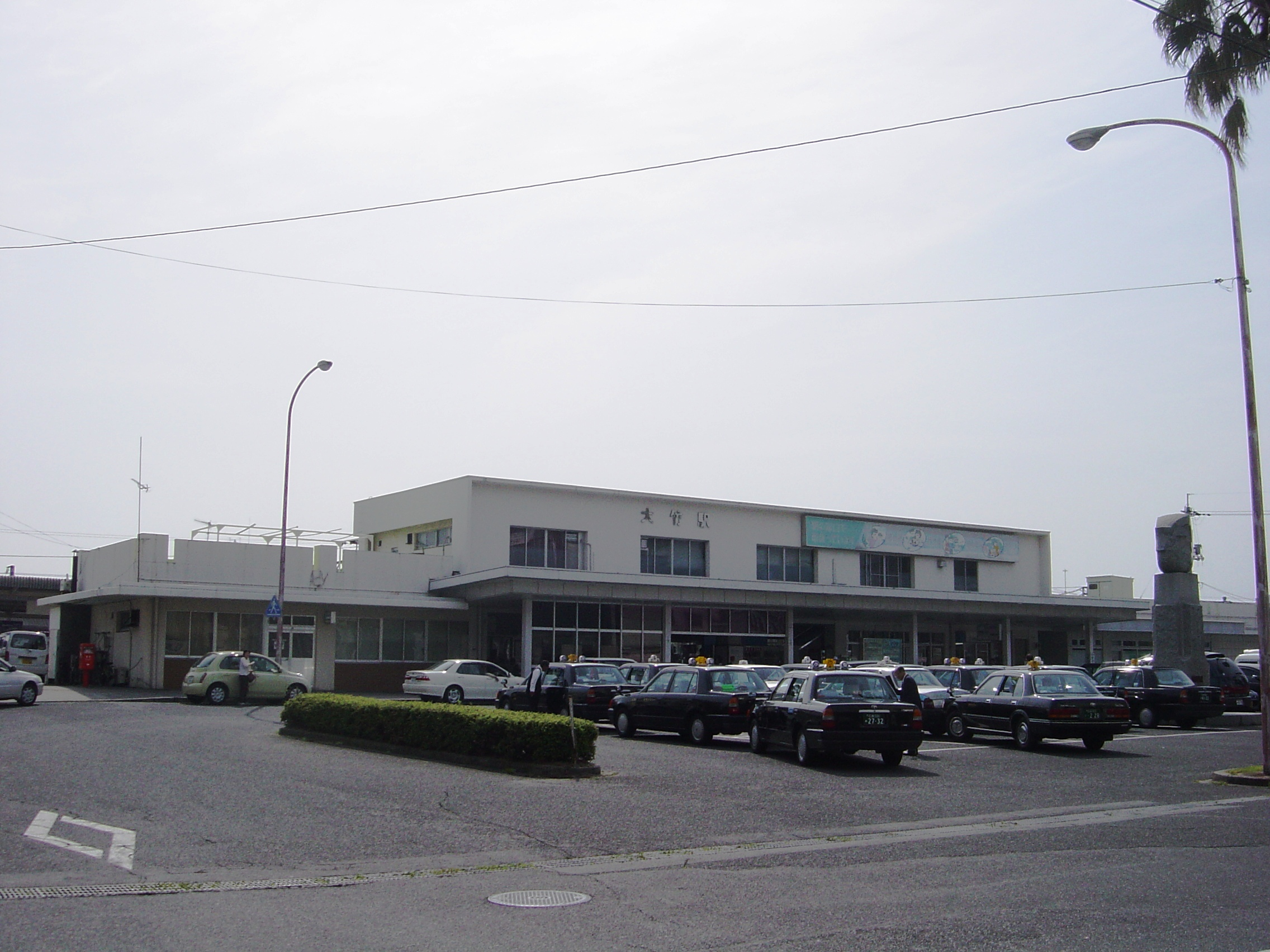
- Ōtake Station in May 2005

General information
- Location: 1-chōme-1 Shinmachi, Ōtake-shi, Hiroshima-ken 739-0611; Japan
- Coordinates: 34°13′4.39″N 132°13′23.03″E
- Owner: West Japan Railway Company
- Operator: West Japan Railway Company; Japan Freight Railway Company
- Line: R Sanyō Main Line
- Distance: 340.8 km (211.8 miles) from Kobe
- Platforms: 1 side + 1 island platform
- Tracks: 2
- Connections: Bus stop

Construction
- Structure type: At-grade
- Accessible: Yes

Other information
- Status: Staffed
- Station code: JR-R14
- Website: Official website

History
- Opened: 25 September 1897; 128 years ago
- Rebuilt: 2023–2024

Passengers
- FY2019: 3279

Services
Preceding station	JR West	Following station
Waki towards Iwakuni	San'yō Line City Liner	Kuba towards Hiroshima
Iwakuni Terminus	San'yō Line Rapid	Miyajimaguchi towards Hiroshima
Waki towards Iwakuni	San'yō Line Local	Kuba towards Hiroshima
Location
- Location within Hiroshima Prefecture Location within Japan

Ōtake Station (大竹駅, Ōtake-eki) is a passenger railway station located in the city of Ōtake, Hiroshima Prefecture, Japan. It is operated by the West Japan Railway Company (JR West). It is also a freight depot operated by the Japan Freight Railway Company (JR Freight).

== Lines ==
Ōtake Station is served by the JR West Sanyō Main Line, and is located 340.8 kilometers from the terminus of the line at Kobe.

== Station layout ==
The station consists of one side platform and one island platform connected by an elevated station building. The station is staffed. Between Platforms 1 and 3, there is a middle track (Platform 2) without a platform, where inbound freight trains arrive and depart. There is another freight line on the outside of Platform 4 on the east side of this station.

== Platforms ==
1	■ R Sanyō Main Line	for Miyajimaguchi and Hiroshima
3	■ R Sanyō Main Line	for Iwakuni and Tokuyama
4	■ R Sanyō Main Line	for freight trains only

== History ==
Ōtake Station was opened on 25 September 1897 as a passenger and freight station on the San'yo Railway with the opening of the line from Hiroshima to Tokuyama. The line was nationalized in 1906 and became the San'yo Main Line in 1909. Freight operations were abandoned in 1962. With the privatization of the Japan National Railway (JNR) on 1 April 1987, the station came under the aegis of the West Japan railway Company (JR West). A new station building on the east side was completed in 2023. The west side of the station building is also undergoing a rebuild and will be opened sometime in 2024.

== Passenger statistics ==
In fiscal 2019, the station was used by an average of 3279 passengers daily.

== Surrounding area ==
- Mitsui Chemicals Iwakuni-Ōtake Plant
- Mitsui DuPont Polychemical Ōtake Factory
- Mitsubishi Chemical Ōtake Works
- Daicel Ōtake Plant
- ENEOS Marifu Refinery
- Nippon Paper Industries Ōtake Mill
- Hiroshima Prefectural Otake High School
- Otake Municipal Otake Junior High School
- Otake Municipal Otake Elementary School

== See also ==
- List of railway stations in Japan
