= Chōshū expedition =

Chōshū expedition (Japanese: 長州征討) may refer to either of two military expeditions led by the Tokugawa Shogunate in Japan in the 19th century:

- First Chōshū expedition (1864)
- Second Chōshū expedition (1866)
