= Miyajima Matsudai Kisen =

Miyajima Matsudai Kisen limited Company 宮島松大汽船株式会社
- Itsukushima ferry
- Type: Public (Kabushiki gaisha) (Non-presentation)
- Industry: Transportation
- Founded: April 1967
- Headquarters: Miyajima-cho, Hatsukaichi, Hiroshima, Japan
- Area served: Hiroshima Prefecture
- Website: Official website

Miyajima Matsudai Kisen Limited Company (宮島松大汽船株式会社, Miyajima Matsudai Kisen Kabushiki-gaisha) is a Japanese ferry company based in Hatsukaichi, Hiroshima, Japan.

It operates tourist ships and car ferries between Miyajimaguchi in Hatsukaichi city and the island of Miyajima (Itsukushima), with journeys taking ten minutes.

Miyajima Matsudai Kisen is a Hiroden Group (Hiroshima Electric Railway) company.

== Piers ==
- Miyajima-guchi
- Miyajima

== See also ==
- Itsukushima Shrine
- Hiroden-miyajima-guchi Station
- JR Miyajima Ferry
