= JR Miyajima Ferry =

JR West Miyajima Ferry Co., Ltd. JR西日本宮島フェリー株式会社

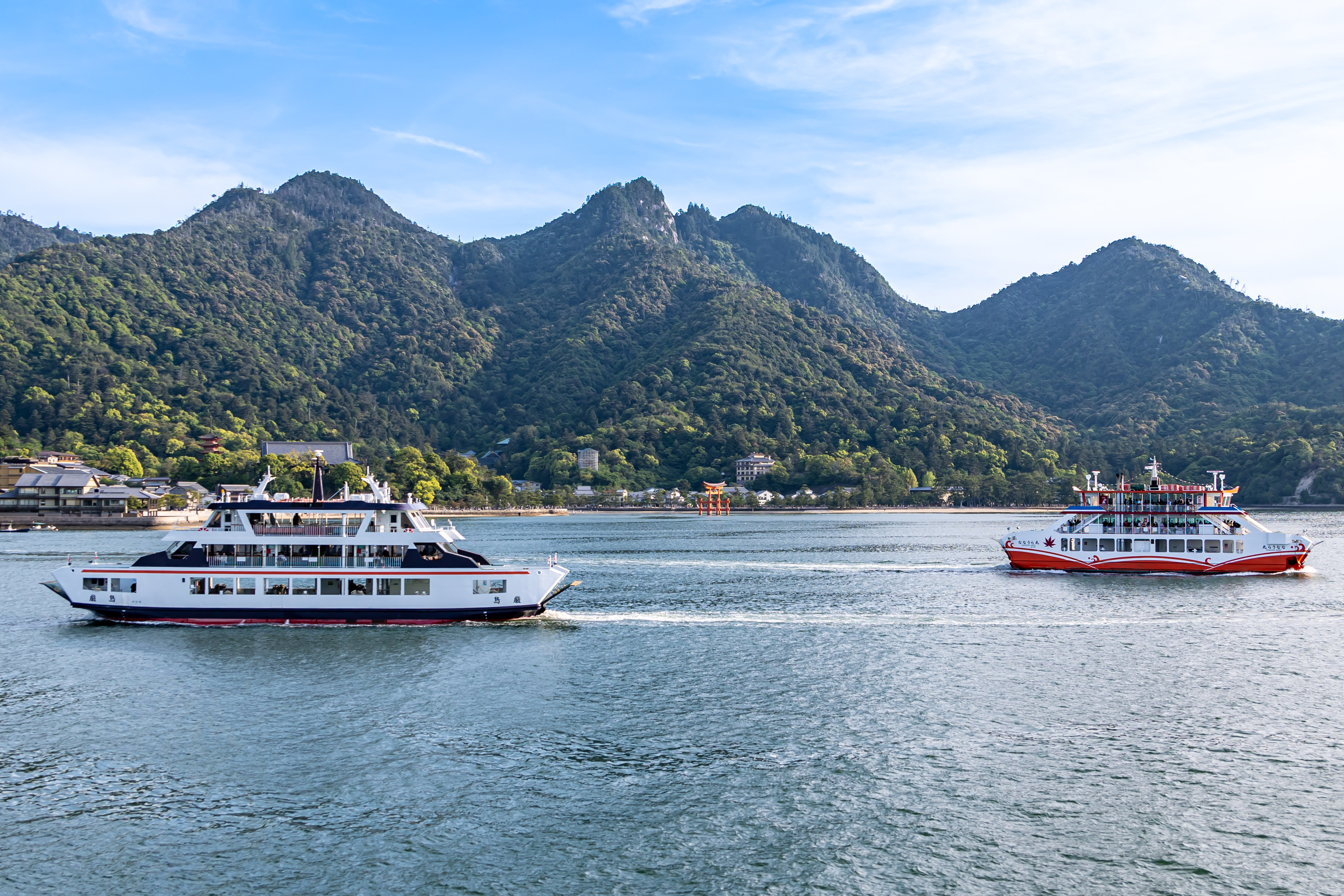
- View of Nanaura Maru (ななうら丸:left side), Mount Misen and torii of Itsukushima Shrine from on the sea.
- Type: Kabushiki gaisha (closely held)
- Industry: Transportation
- Founded: 1 April 2009; 17 years ago
- Headquarters: Miyajima-chō, Hatsukaichi City, Hiroshima Prefecture, Japan
- Area served: Hiroshima Prefecture
- Number of employees: 25 people
- Website: Official website

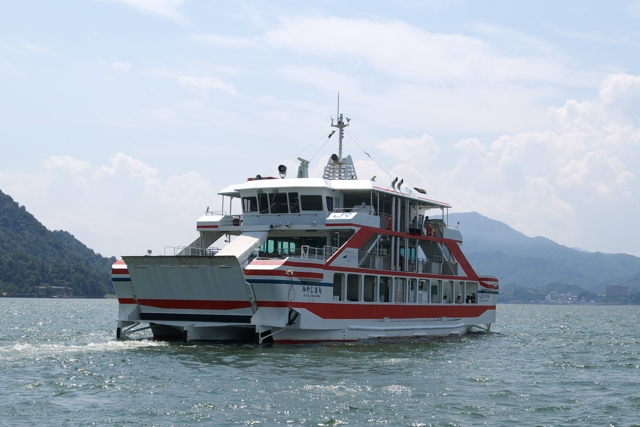
Miyajima-maru

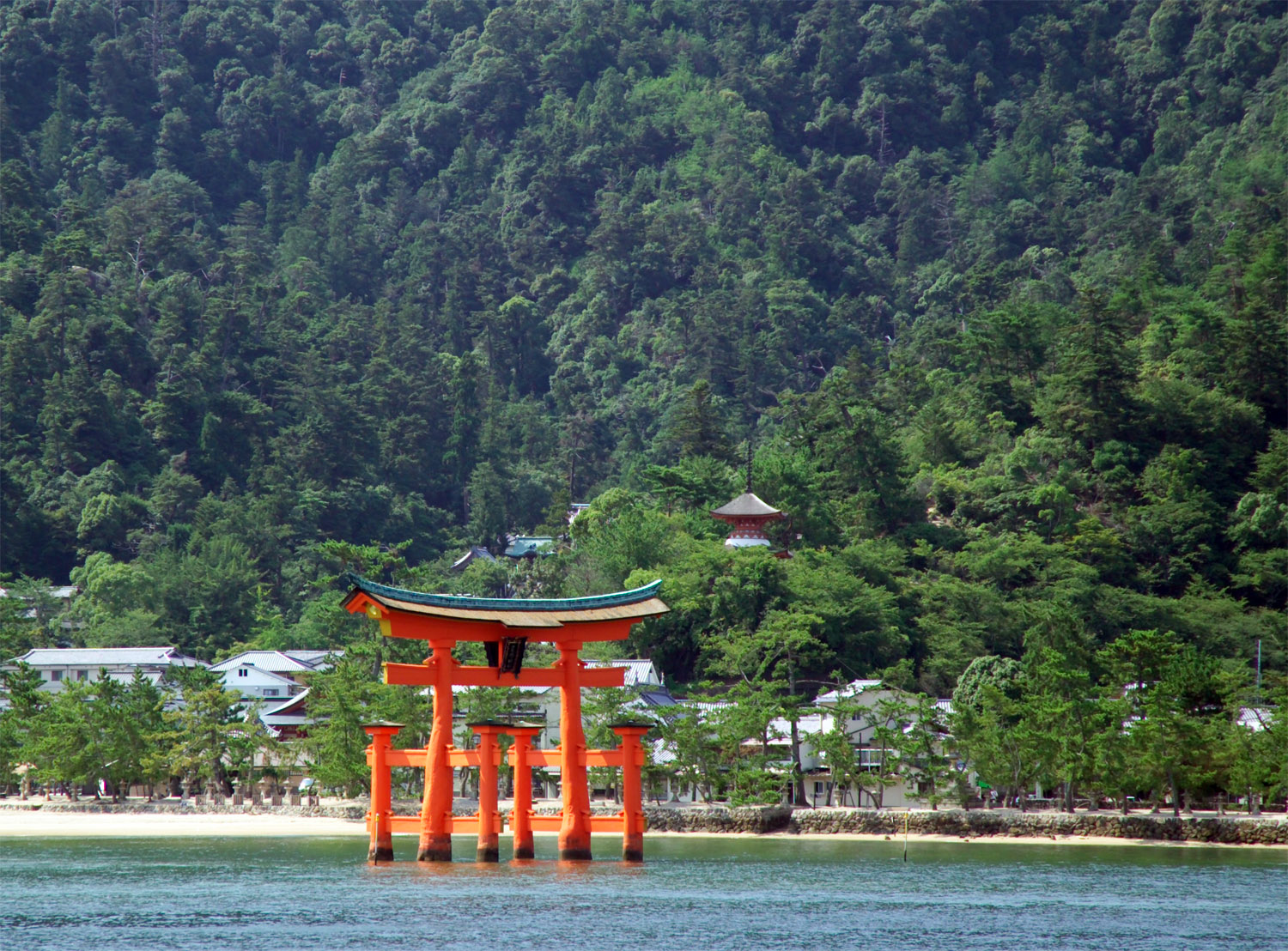
View of torii of Itsukushima Shrine from ferry

JR Miyajima Ferry (JR宮島フェリー, Jeiāru Miyajima Ferī) is the ferry route between Miyajimaguchi, Hatsukaichi, Hiroshima and Miyajima (Itsukushima). JR Miyajima Ferries are operated by JR West Miyajima Ferry Co., Ltd. (JR西日本宮島フェリー株式会社, Jeiāru Nishinihon Miyajima Ferī Kabushiki Kaisha), a wholly owned subsidiary of West Japan Railway Company (JR West).

There are three ferries called the Miyajima-maru, the Nanaura-maru, and the Misen-maru. One trip between Miyajima-guchi and Miyajima takes ten minutes.

== History ==
The private boat route was founded in 1897. The ferry route was placed in a public company in 1899. The ferry route was bought by Sanyo Railway in 1903. Sanyo Railway was nationalized as part of the Japanese Government Railways in 1906. Japanese National Railways, which was reorganized from government railways in 1949, was privatized in 1987. Operations in the Hiroshima area were assigned to JR West. JR West transferred the ferry business to its new subsidiary JR West Miyajima Ferry Co., Ltd. on April 1, 2009. The route, commonly called Miyajima Renrakusen (宮島連絡船), was one of those classified as tetsudō renrakusen (鉄道連絡船), ferry routes as a part of railway network. All other JR renrakusen routes were closed by 1990 and the JR Miyajima Ferry was the last one of that kind until its separation in 2009.

== Piers ==
- Miyajima-guchi
- Miyajima

== See also ==
- Miyajima Matsudai Kisen - operates a similar route
