= Waki, Yamaguchi =

Waki 和木町
- Town
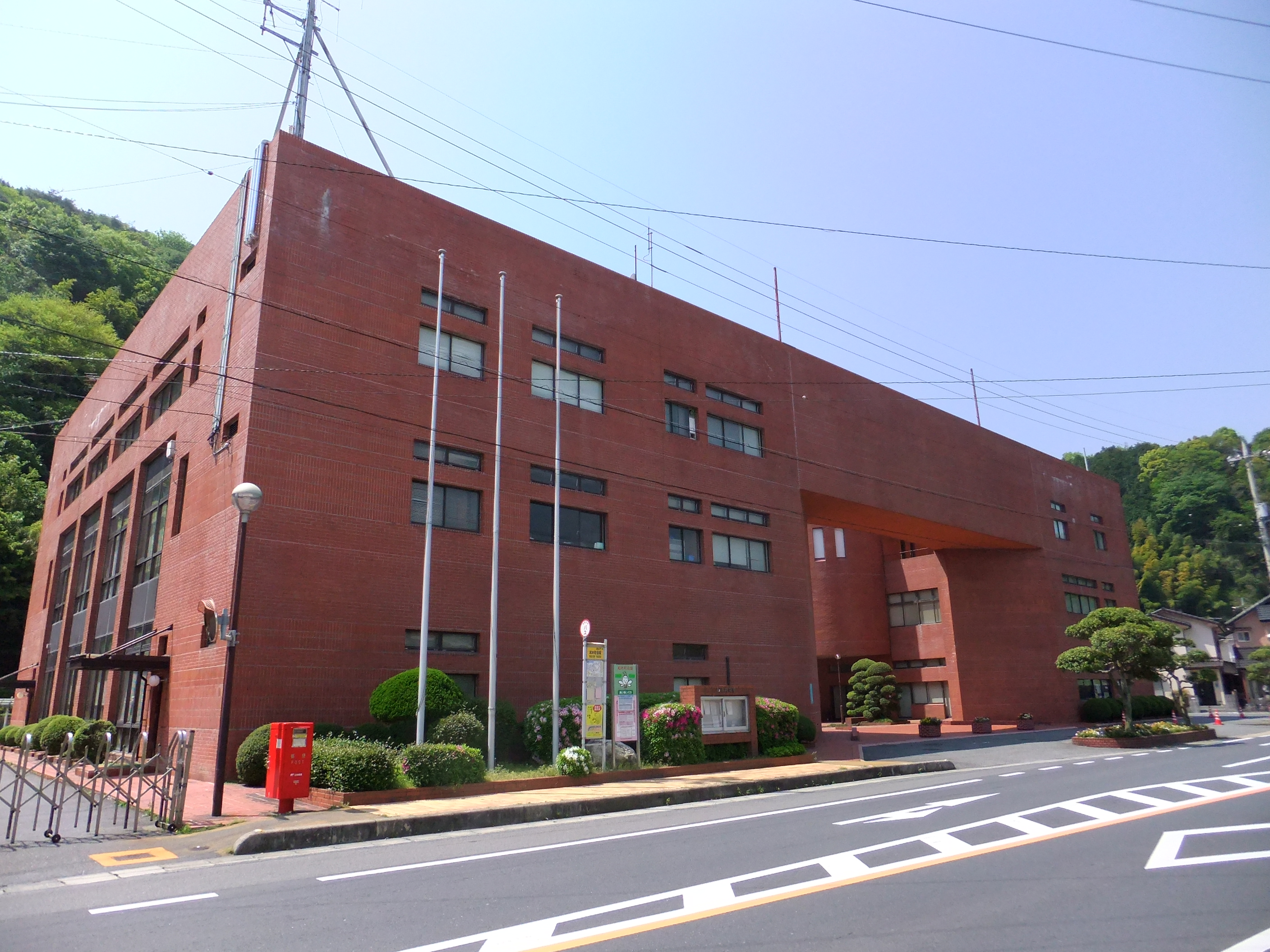
- Waki Town Office

- Flag Emblem
- Interactive map outlining Waki
- Location of Waki in Yamaguchi Prefecture

- Location in Japan
- Coordinates: 34°12′09″N 132°13′13″E
- Country: Japan
- Region: Chūgoku; San'yō
- Prefecture: Yamaguchi
- District: Kuga

Area
  - Total: 10.58 km^{2} (4.08 sq mi)

Population (May 31, 2023)
  - Total: 5,927
  - Density: 560.2/km^{2} (1,451/sq mi)
- Time zone: UTC+09:00 (JST)
- City hall address: 1-1-1 Waki, Waki-cho, Kuga-gun, Yamaguchi-ken 740-8501
- Website: Official website
- Symbols
- Flower: Azalea
- Tree: Myrica rubra

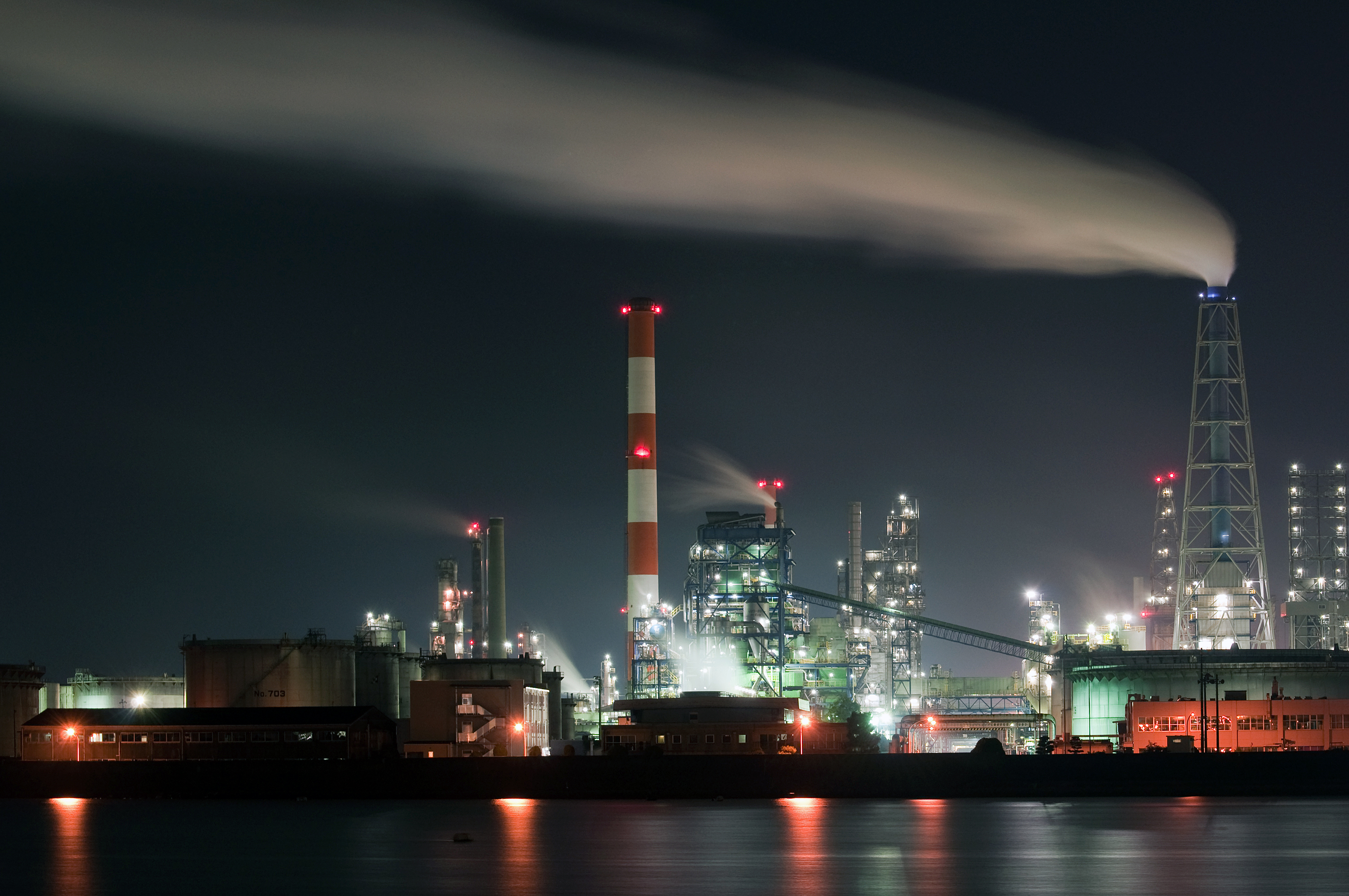
ENEOS refinery in Waki

Waki (和木町, Waki-chō) is a town in Kuga District, Yamaguchi Prefecture, Japan. As of 31 May 2023, the town had an estimated population of 5,927 in 2684 households and a population density of 560 persons per km^{2}. The total area of the town is 10.58 square kilometres (4.08 sq mi).

== Geography ==
Waki is located at the mouth of the right bank of the Oze River, which is also the prefectural border between Yamaguchi Prefecture and Hiroshima Prefecture. It is surrounded by Iwakuni city on the south side, and borders Ōtake city in Hiroshima Prefecture on the north side across the Oze River. In the eastern part of the town (Waki neighborhood), there are major public facilities, including the town hall, and lowlands that include reclaimed land, where most of the transportation and industrial facilities are located. Other areas (Seta neighborhood and Sekigahama neighborhood) are mostly mountainous areas, and old hamlets exist along the tributaries of the Oze River.

=== Neighbouring municipalities ===
Hiroshima Prefecture

- Ōtake

Yamaguchi Prefecture

- Iwakuni

=== Climate ===
Waki has a humid subtropical climate (Köppen climate classification Cfa) with very warm summers and cool winters. The average annual temperature in Waki is 15.2 °C. The average annual rainfall is 1658 mm with September as the wettest month. The temperatures are highest on average in July, at around 26.2 °C, and lowest in January, at around 4.6 °C.

== Demographics ==
Per Japanese census data, the population of Waki has been steady for the past 50 years.

Historical population
Year	Pop.	±%
1940	2,346	—
1950	3,520	+50.0%
1960	5,627	+59.9%
1970	7,740	+37.6%
1980	7,516	−2.9%
1990	7,086	−5.7%
2000	6,732	−5.0%
2010	6,379	−5.2%
Waki population statistics

== History ==
The area of Waki was part of an ancient Suō Province. During the Edo Period, the area was part of the holdings of Iwakuni Domain. Following the Meiji restoration, the area was organized into villages of Oze, Waki, Sekigahama, and Seta within Kuga District, Yamaguchi with the creation of the modern municipalities system on April 1, 1889. Waki as elevated to town status on April 1, 1973.

== Government ==
Waki has a mayor-council form of government with a directly elected mayor and a unicameral town council of ten members. Waki, together with the city of Iwakuni contributes five members to the Yamaguchi Prefectural Assembly. In terms of national politics, the town is part of the Yamaguchi 2nd district of the lower house of the Diet of Japan.

== Economy ==
Heavy industry, oil refineries and the chemical industry dominate the economy of the town, which occupies a corner of the Setouchi Industrial Area.

== Education ==
Waki has one public elementary school and one public junior high school operated by the town government. The town does not have a high school.

== Transportation ==
=== Railway ===
JR West (JR West) - San'yō Main Line

- Waki

=== Highways ===
- National Route 2

== Sister cities ==
Waki has had a sister city relationship with the city of Eniwa, Hokkaido, since 1979, as a symbol of mass immigration of Waki residents to Eniwa in around 1886.
