= JA Hiroshimabyoin-mae Station =

Railway station in Hatsukaichi, Hiroshima prefecture, Japan

Coordinates: 34°20′38″N 132°19′21″E

JA Hiroshimabyoin-mae JA広島病院前
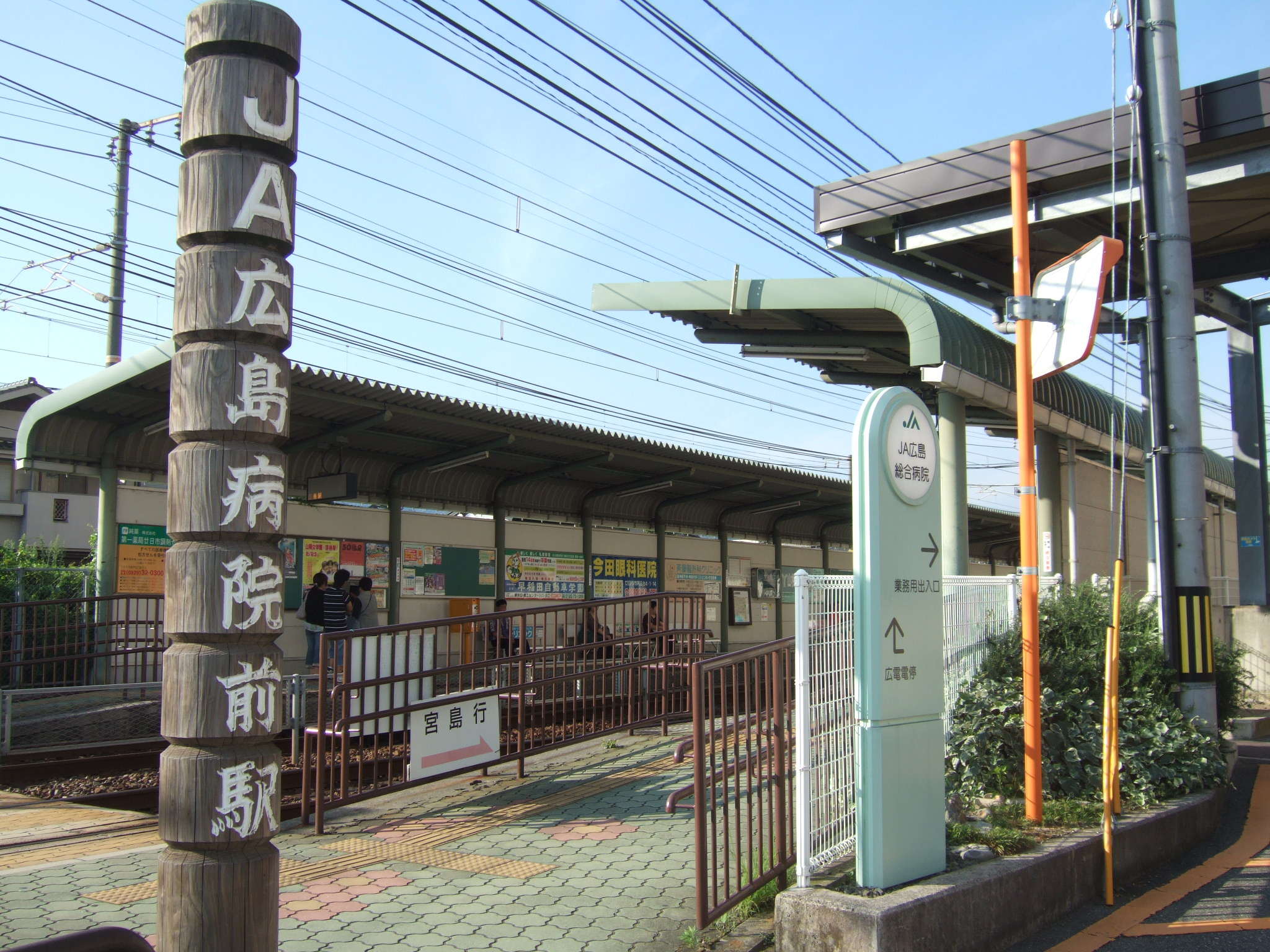

General information
- Location: 1-9964, Jigozen, Hatsukaichi, Hiroshima; Japan
- Operator: Hiroshima Electric Railway
- Lines: Hiroden █ Miyajima Line; Route

Other information
- Station code: M35

History
- Opened: September 1, 1998
Location

JA Hiroshimabyoin-mae is a Hiroden station on Hiroden Miyajima Line, located in front of JA Hiroshima Kōseiren Hiroshima General Hospital, in Jigozen, Hatsukaichi, Hiroshima.

== Routes ==
From JA Hiroshimabyoin-mae Station, there is one of Hiroden Streetcar routes.

- Hiroshima Station - Hiroden-miyajima-guchi Route

== Connections ==
█ Miyajima Line

Miyauchi — JA Hiroshimabyoin-mae — Jigozen

== Around station ==
- JA Hiroshima Kōseiren Hiroshima General Hospital

== History ==
- Opened on September 1, 1998.

== See also ==
- Hiroden lines and routes
