= Daishō-in =

Buddhist temple in Hiroshima Prefecture, Japan

- 大聖院
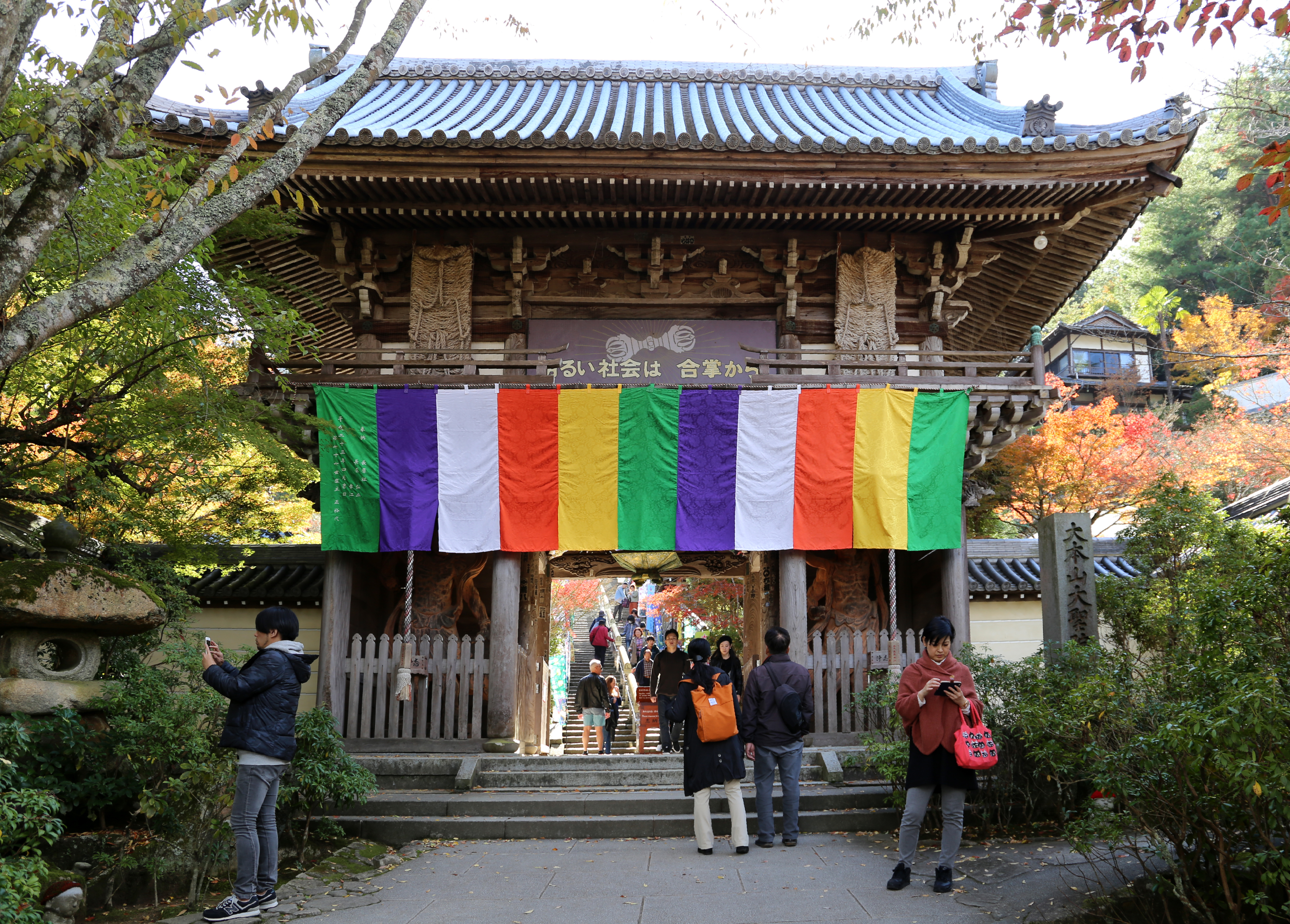
- Niōmon Gate

Religion
- Affiliation: Buddhism
- Sect: Shingon
- Prefecture: Hiroshima
- Year consecrated: 806

Location
- Country: Japan
- Interactive map of Daishō-in
- Prefecture: Hiroshima
- Coordinates: 34°17′31″N 132°19′07″E

Architecture
- Founder: Kūkai
- Destroyed: 20 May 2026

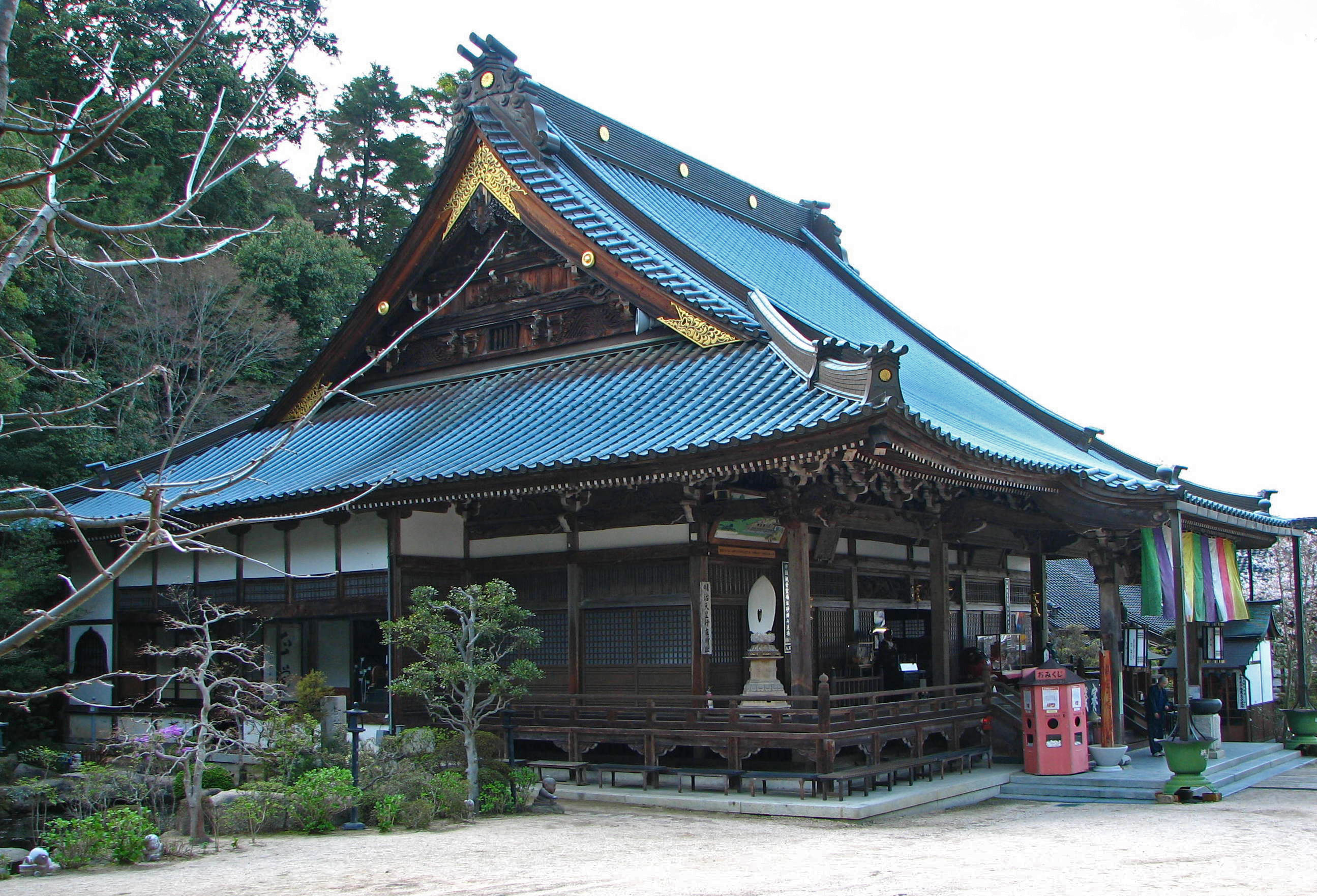
Kannon-dō Hall

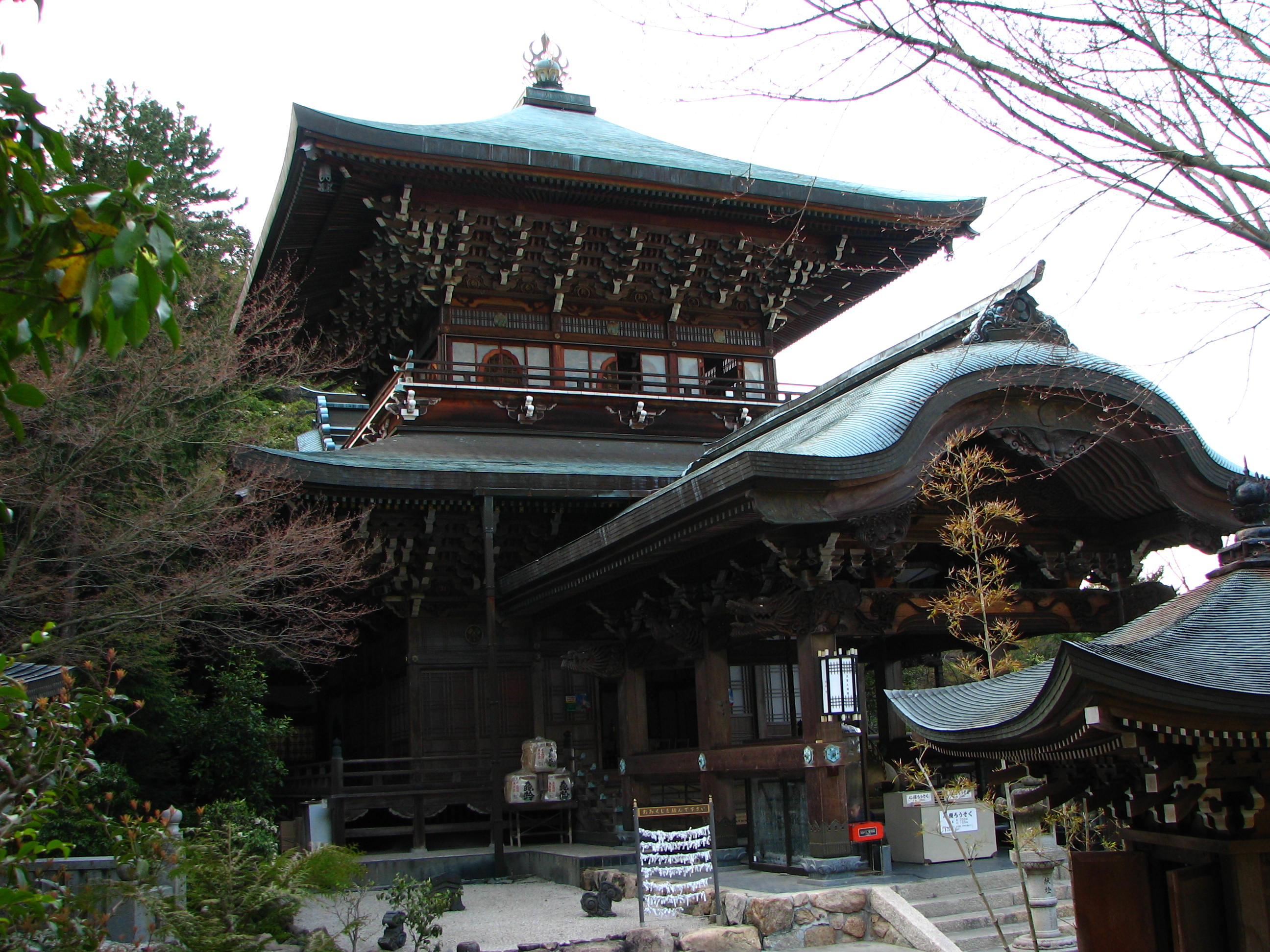
Maniden Hall

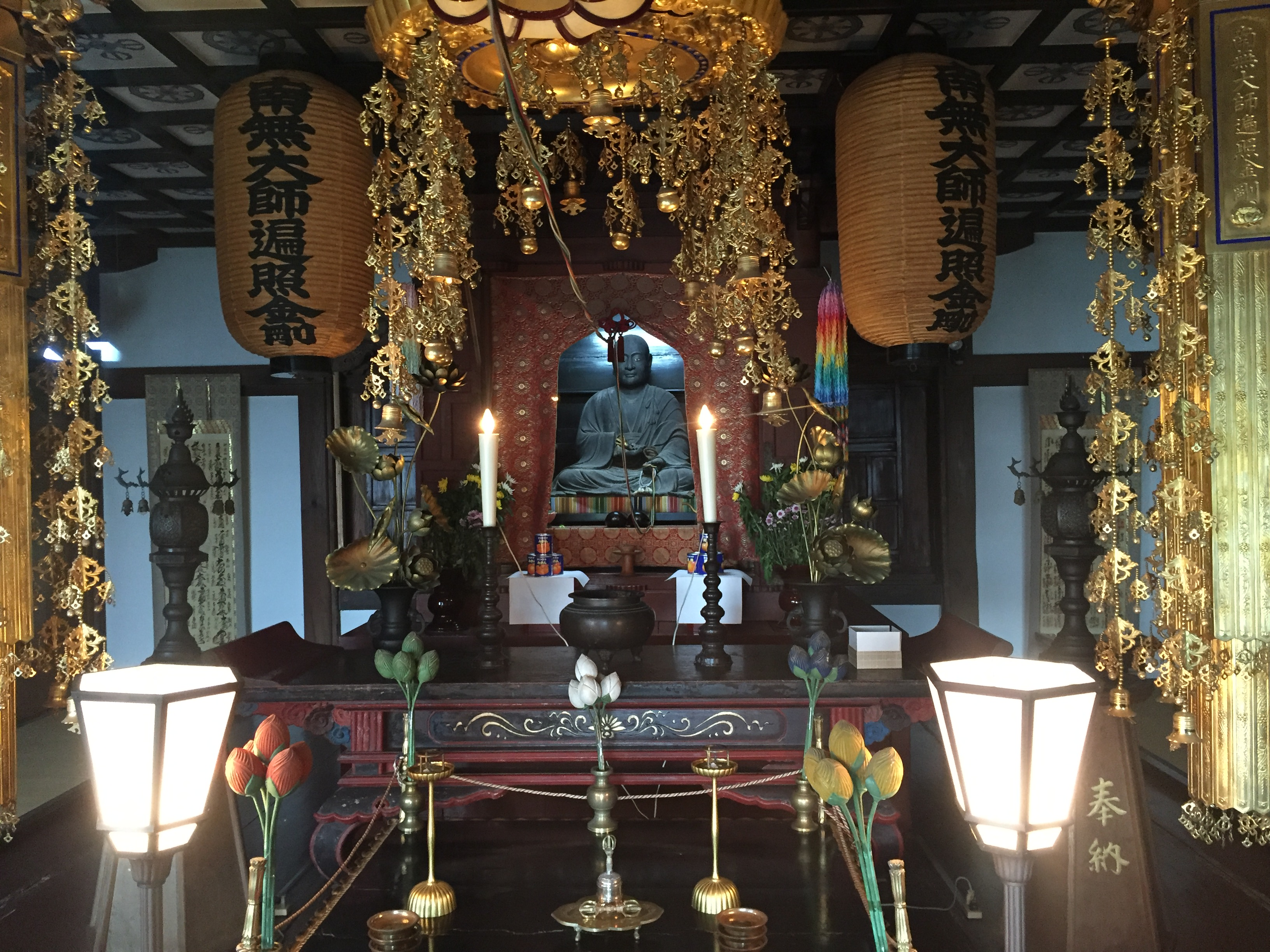
Kobo Daishi image at Daishoin, Miyajima

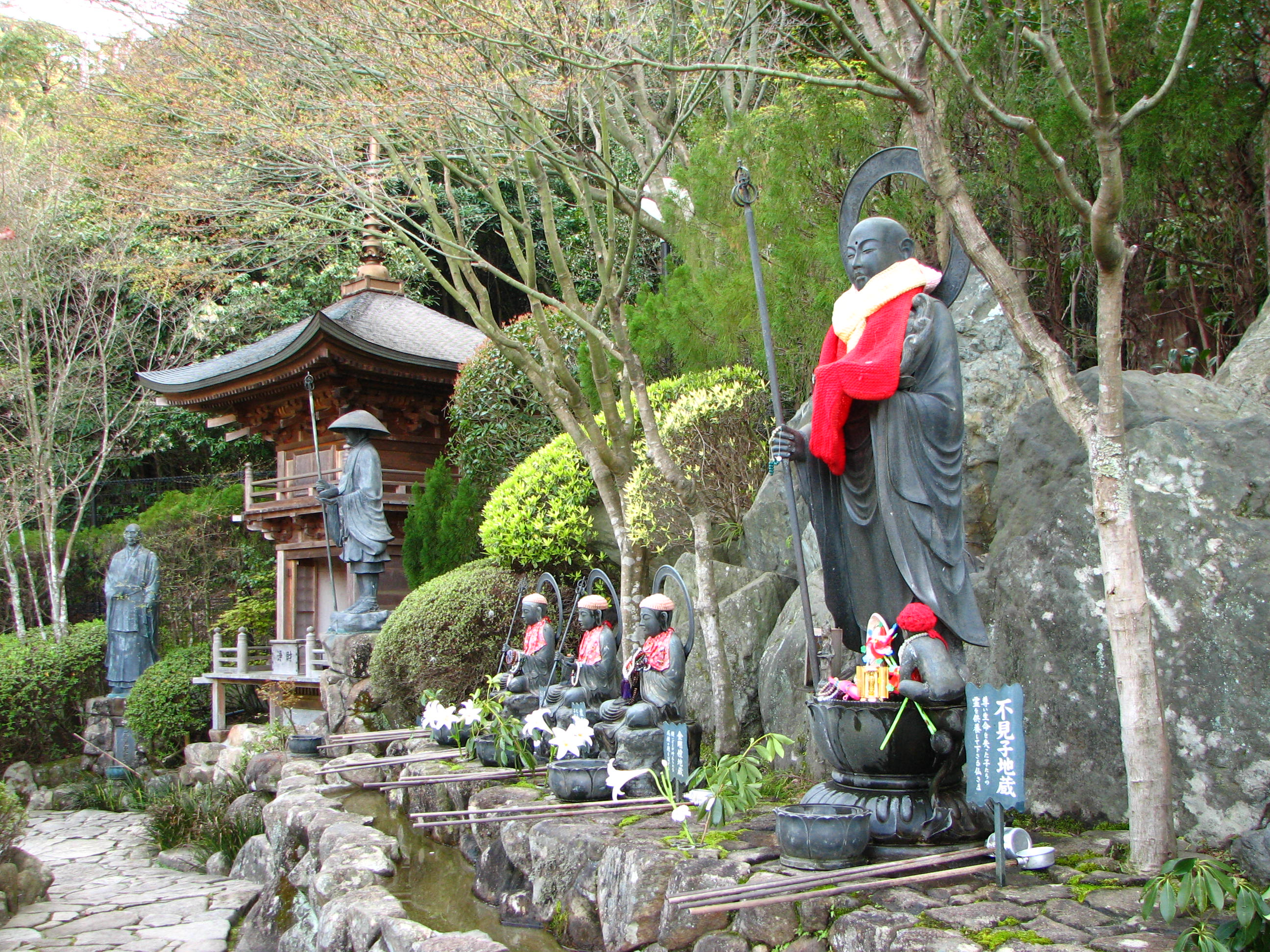
Daishō-in temple Jizō statues

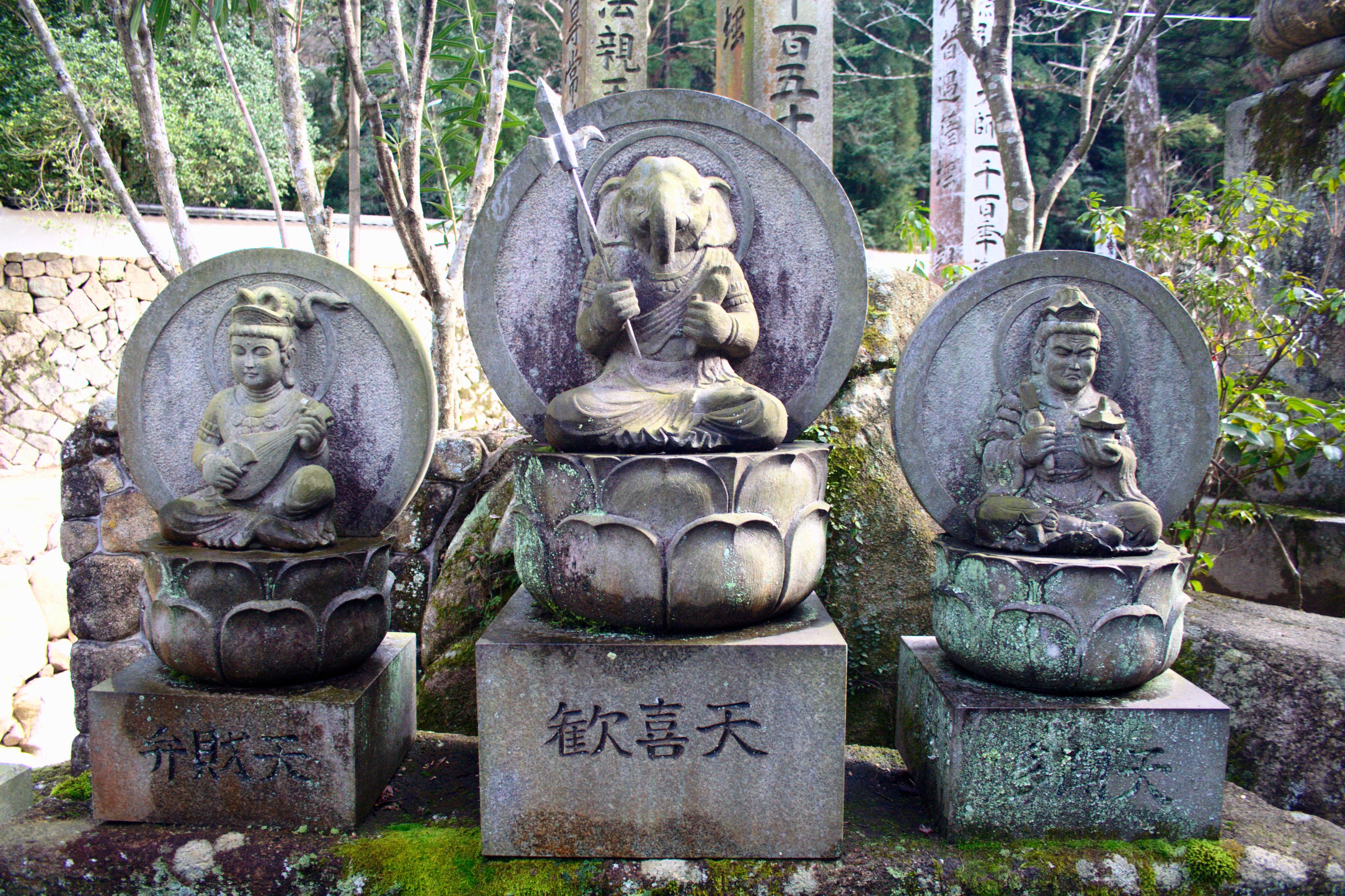
Statues of Benzaiten (Saraswati), Kangiten (Ganesh), and Bishamonten (Kubera) in the Daishō-in temple.

Daishō-in or Daisyō-in (大聖院; lit. 'Great Holy Temple'), also called Suishō-ji (水精寺; lit. 'Crystal Temple'), is a Japanese Buddhist temple complex with many temples and statues on Mount Misen, the holy mountain on the island of Itsukushima, off the coast of Hatsukaichi, Hiroshima, Japan. It is the 14th temple in the Chūgoku 33 Kannon Pilgrimage and famous for the maple trees and their autumn colors. Including Mt. Misen, Daishō-in is within the World Heritage Area of Itsukushima Shrine. There are also many buildings, gates of the temple and statues of Kannon, Jūichimen Kannon, Fudō-myōō (Acala) and Seven Lucky Gods on and around Mt. Misen.

The temple's Reikado Hall (霊火堂) housed a flame which is said to have been burning since its foundation in the 9th century CE. The hall collapsed in a fire in 2026. The administrators of the temple stated they had "salvaged" the fire and would work to rebuild the hall.

== History ==
According to tradition, Daishō-in was founded by the monk Kūkai, also known posthumously as Kōbō-Daishi (弘法大師), in 806 CE, the 1st year of the Daidō era. Kūkai was one of the most famous monks in Japan and the founder of Shingon Buddhism. Daishō-in was made head temple of one of denomination of Shingon Buddhism and the oldest temple on Itsukushima. By an Imperial order of Emperor Toba, it was the place to pray for the peace and security of the nation. The temple was the administrator of the Itsukushima shrine before the Meiji Restoration forbade syncretism (Shinbutsu-shūgō) between Shinto and Buddhism in 1868 as part of the Shinbutsu bunri policy. Emperor Meiji stayed there on 31 July 1885, for his visit to Itsukushima Shrine.

Repair work for the trail to Mount Misen was finished in 1905 through a donation of Itō Hirobumi. Heavy damage by 19th typhoon on 27 September 1991. A memorial service was held to congratulate the restoration of the damage on 10 October 1998. The 14th Dalai Lama visited Itsukushima to celebrate the 1200th year of Daishō-in from 3 to 8 November 2006. The Sacred Fire Hall of the temple was completely burned in a fire at around 8:30 a.m. Japan Standard Time on 20 May 2026 (23:30 p.m. UTC, 19 May).

== See also ==
- Kūkai
- Shingon Buddhism
- Kannon
- Acala
- Seven Lucky Gods
- Glossary of Japanese Buddhism
