= Itsukushima =

Island in Japan

Coordinates: 34°16′32″N 132°18′28″E

Native name: 厳島 Nickname: Miyajima
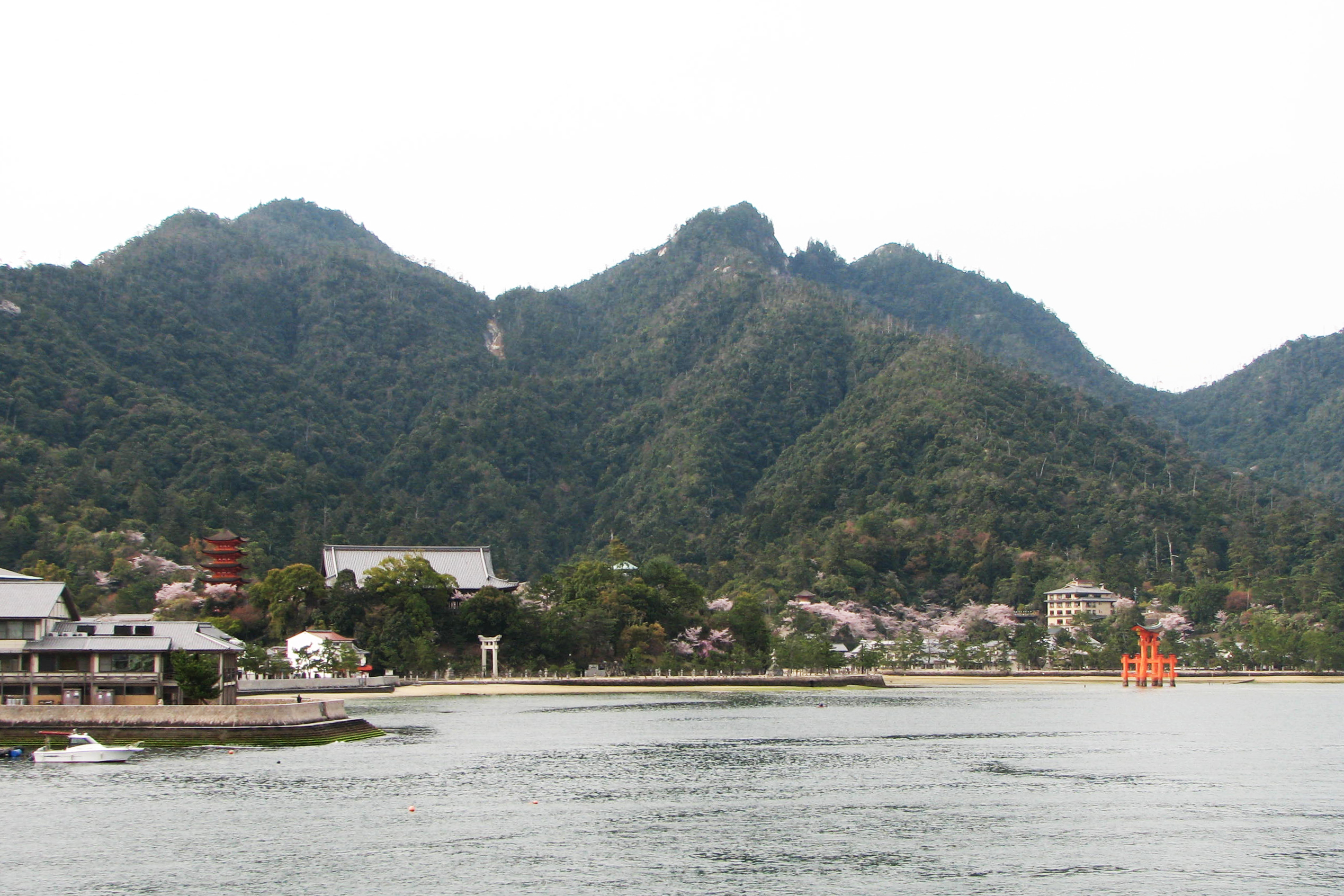
- Itsukushima Island

- Location within Hiroshima Prefecture Location within Japan

Geography
- Location: Seto Inland Sea
- Area: 30.39 km^{2} (11.73 sq mi)
- Highest elevation: 535 m (1755 ft)
- Highest point: Mount Misen

Administration
- Japan

Demographics
- Population: 2,000

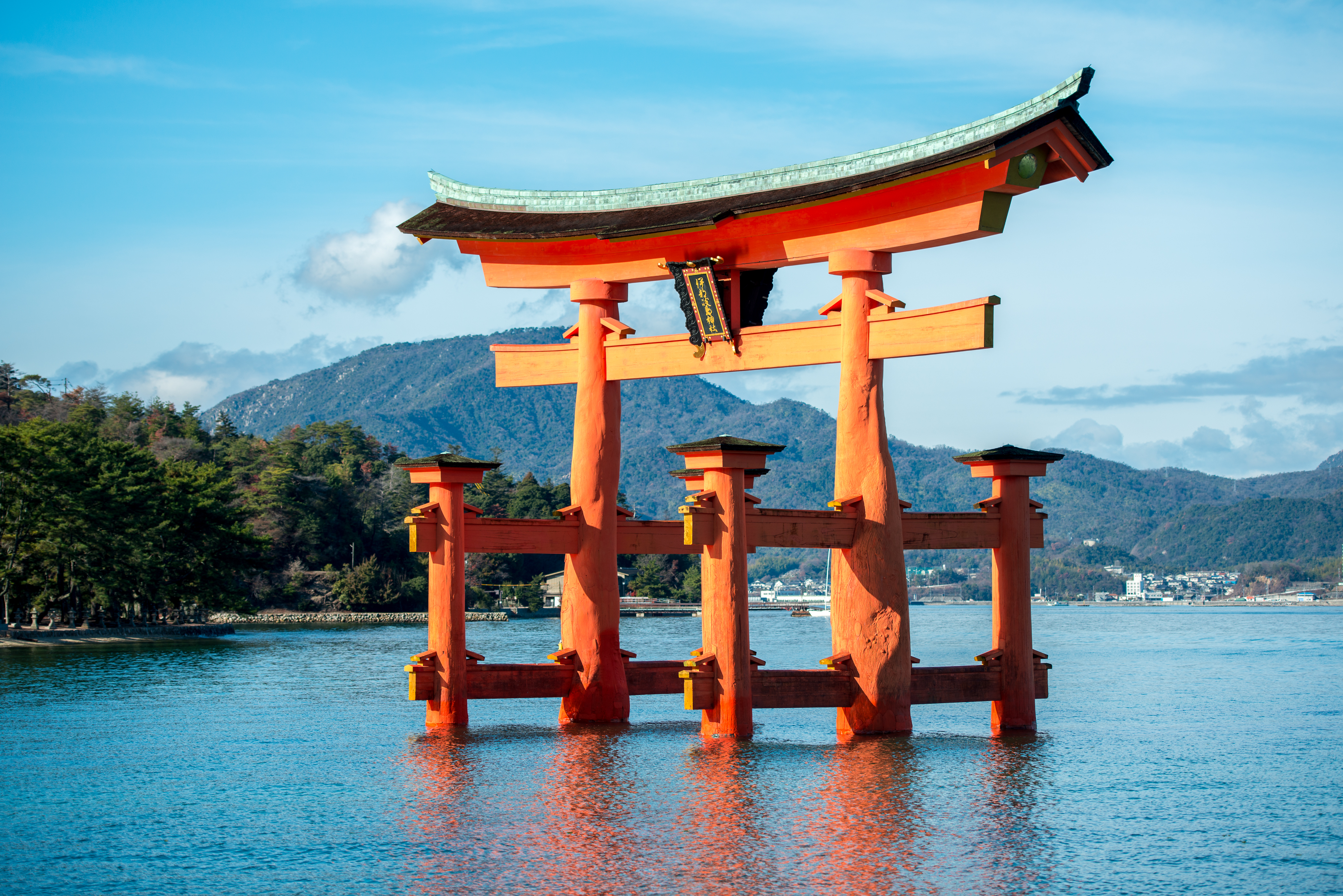
This torii at the Itsukushima Shrine welcomes visitors to the island.

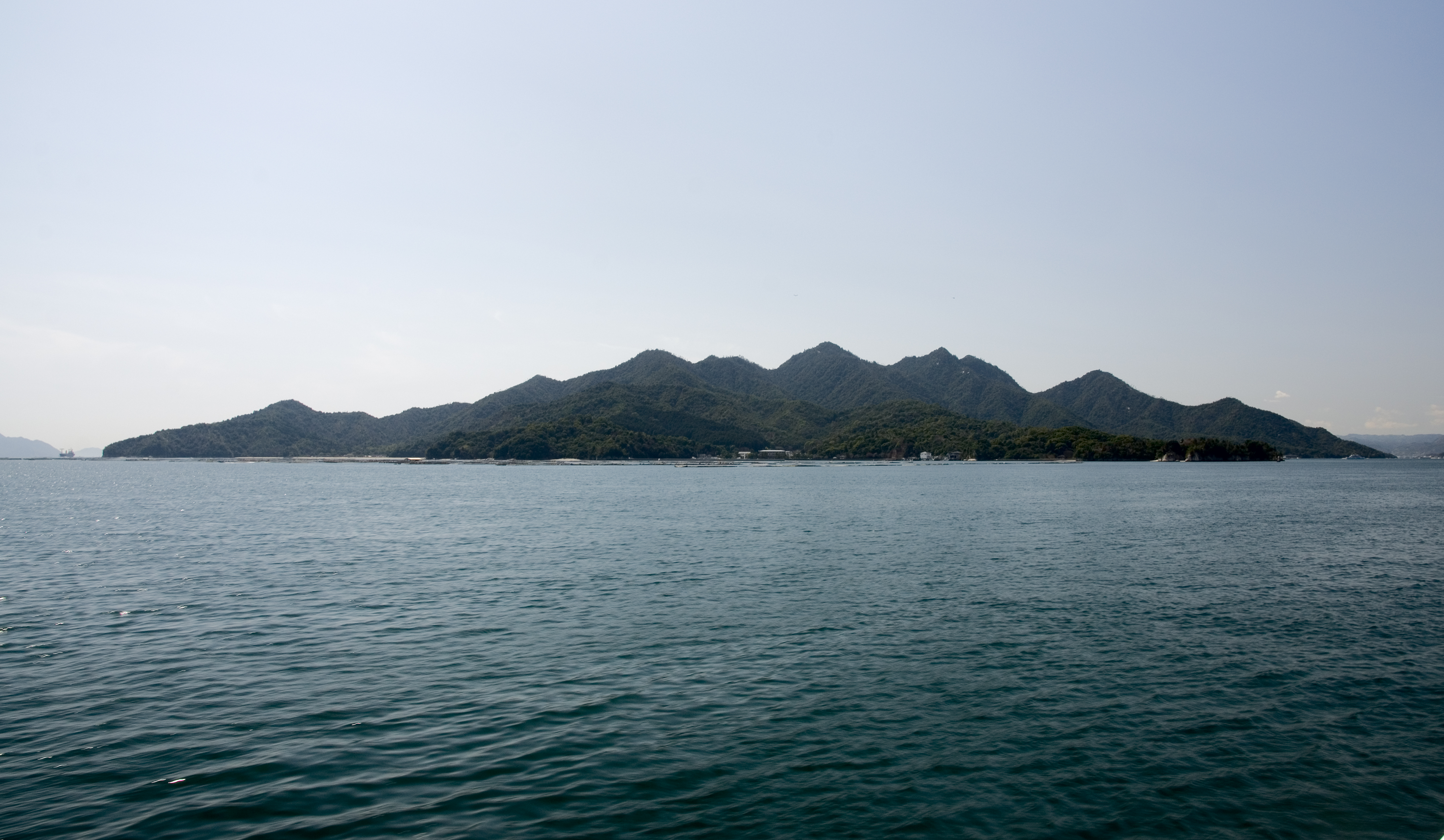
Overview of Miyajima/Itsukushima island in the Inland Sea from the east direction, Japan

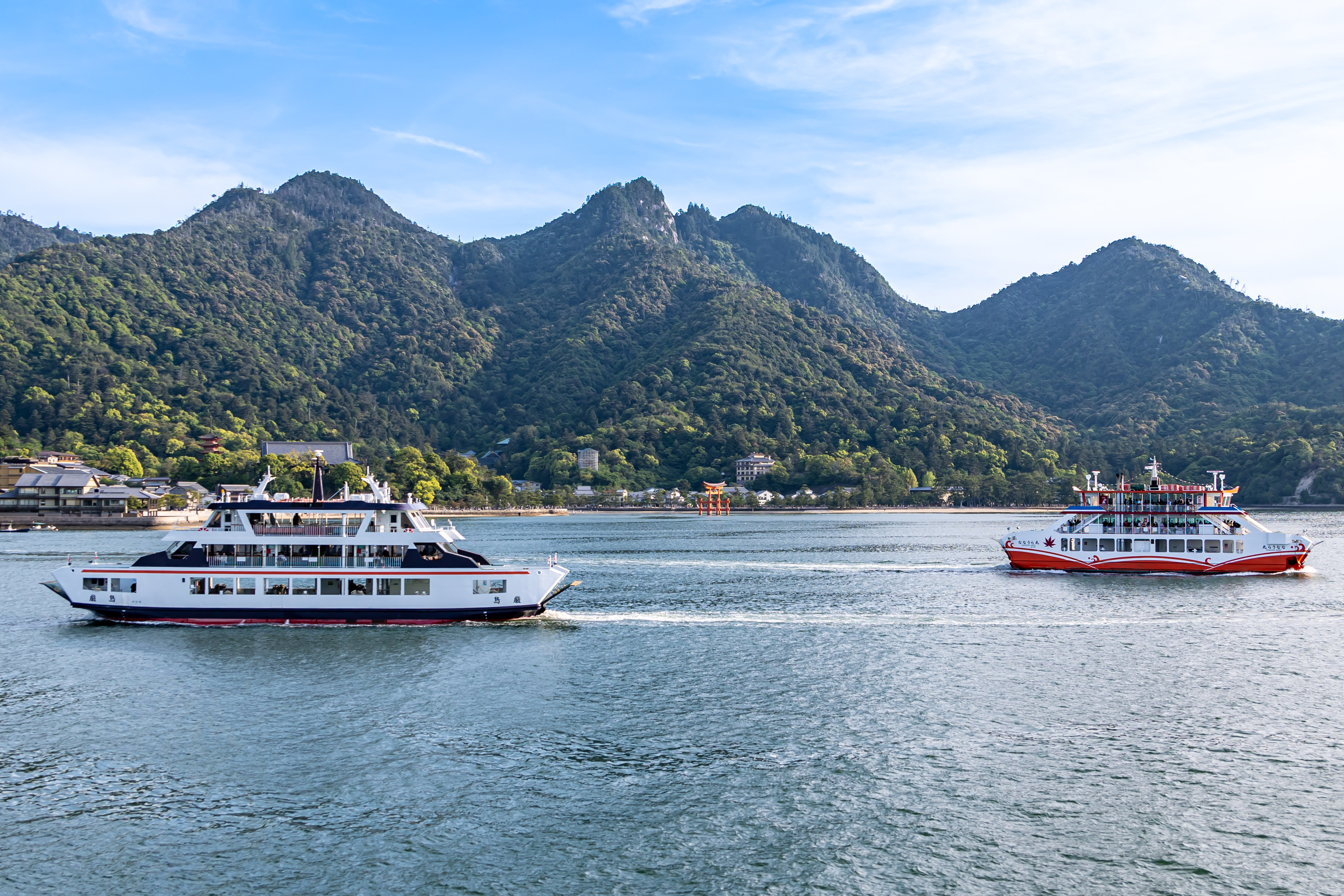
View of Ferry, Mount Misen and torii of Itsukushima Shrine from on the sea.

Itsukushima (厳島) is an island in the western part of the Inland Sea of Japan, located in the northwest of Hiroshima Bay. It is popularly known as Miyajima (宮島), which in Japanese means "Shrine Island". The island is one of Hayashi Gahō's Three Views of Japan specified in 1643. Itsukushima is part of the city of Hatsukaichi in Hiroshima Prefecture. The island was part of the former town of Miyajima before the 2005 merger with Hatsukaichi.

Itsukushima is famous for the Itsukushima Shrine, a UNESCO World Heritage Site. The shrine was considered a sacred site for a long time, it is possible that locals built a simple shrine on the site before the complex was built in 593 AD. In 1168 AD, Taira no Kiyomori, a warrior-courtier, greatly contributed to giving the shrine its current form. In the 16th century, Toyotomi Hideyoshi, a famed Japanese warlord, built a large building, the Senjō-kaku, on a hill above the shrine.

Itsukushima has a number of temples, including Toyokuni Shrine with a five-storied pagoda, and Daiganji Temple - one of the three most famous Benzaiten temples of Japan. The island is also famous for its upper hill side cherry blossoms and maple leaf autumn foliage.

The island of Itsukushima, including the waters around it (part of Seto Inland Sea), lies within Setonaikai National Park. This sea is affected by strong tides. At low tide, the bottom of the sea is exposed past the island's torii. At high tide, the sea covers all the previously exposed seabed mud and fills areas underneath the shrine boardwalk.

== Location and geography ==
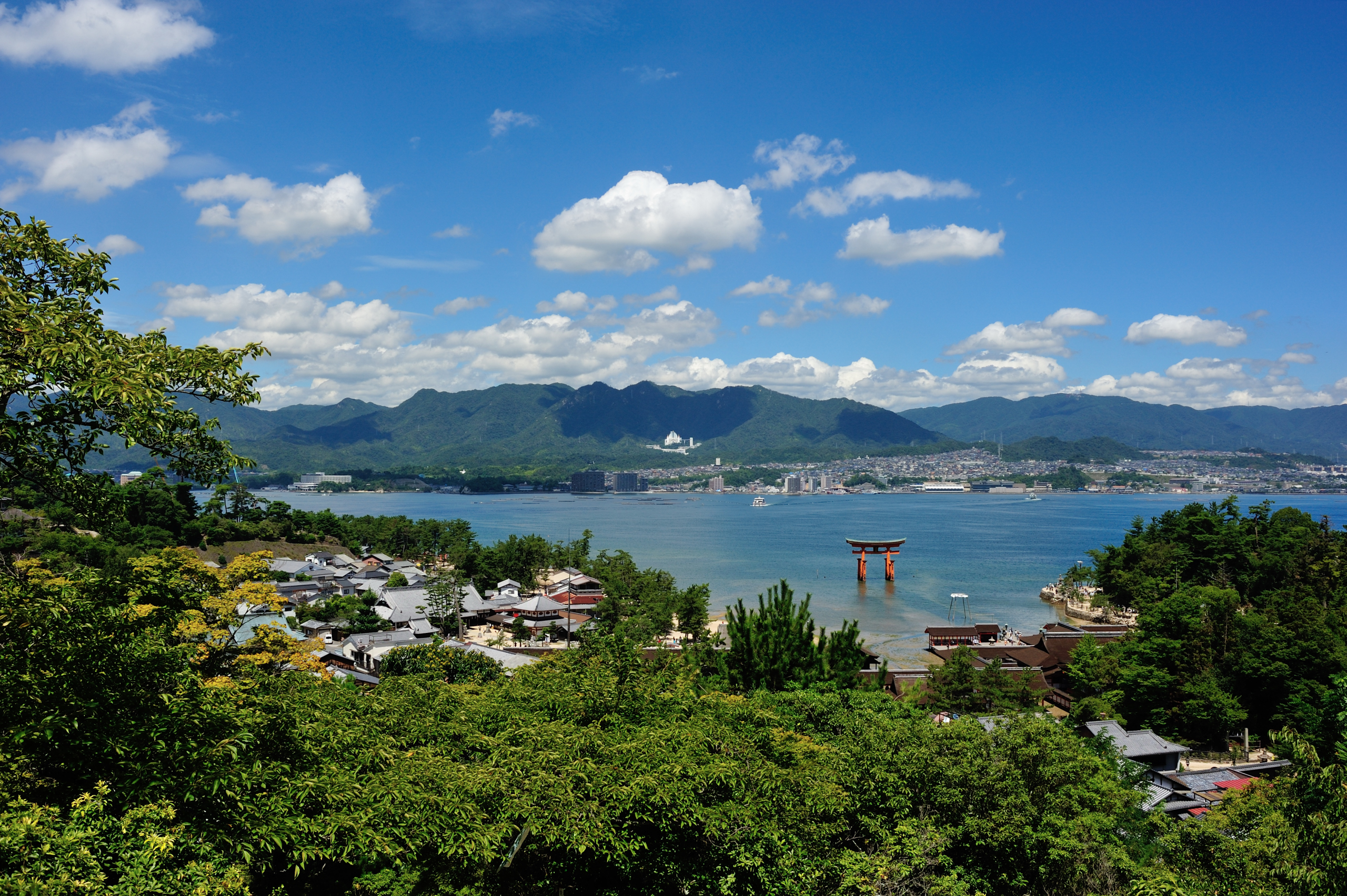
An aerial view of the Itsukushima-jinja torii and the main island from the ropeway/hiking trails of Miyajima.

Itsukushima is mountainous and sparsely settled. It has an elementary school and a middle school. There are no traffic signals. It is rural and mountainous, has an area of only 30.39 square kilometres (11.73 sq mi), and has a population of about 2,000. There are no cities, only small towns with simple houses and privately owned shops. The islanders work hard to preserve the forests and respect nature.

Frequent ferry services, operated by JR West (JR Miyajima ferry) and by Miyajima Matsudai Tourist Ship, carry traffic between the island and the mainland at Miyajimaguchi. The trip takes about ten minutes. There is an hourly express passenger ferry to Hiroshima harbour.

Miyajima's maple trees are renowned throughout Japan and blanket the island in crimson in the autumn. Momiji manjū, pastries filled with azuki jam or custard, are popular souvenirs and carry maple-leaf emblems. Many other varieties, such as chocolate and cheese, are available. Because the island is seen as sacred, trees may not be cut for lumber. Sika deer roam freely. Deer are thought of as sacred in the native Shinto religion because they are considered messengers of the gods. They walk the streets of the city, not afraid of the tourists.

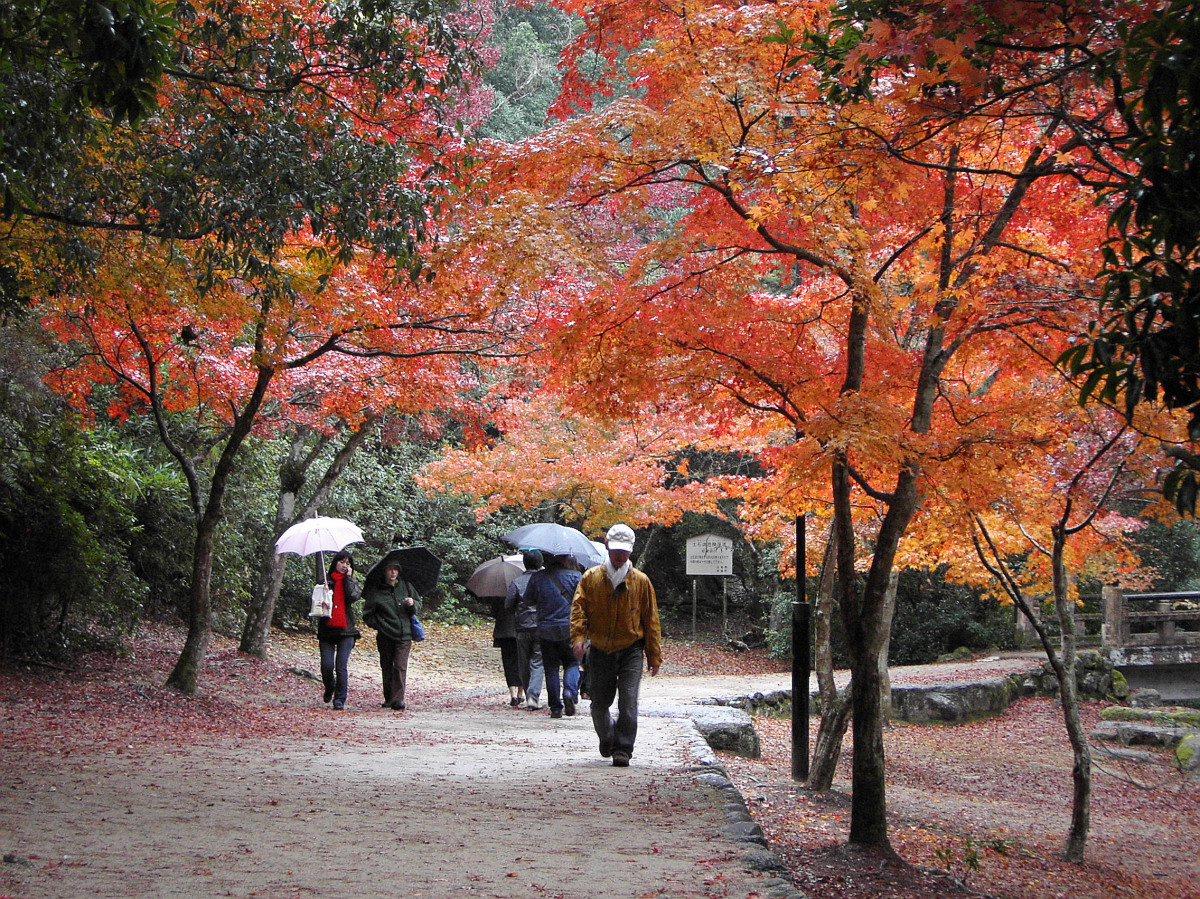
Autumn colours on Miyajima Island Japan

The shamoji, a style of wooden paddle used to serve cooked rice without impairing the taste, is said to have been invented by a monk who lived on the island. The shamoji is a popular souvenir, and there are some outsized examples around the shopping district.

The peak of Mount Misen, at 535 metres (1,755 ft), is the highest point on the island. Miyajima Ropeway carries visitors to within a 30-minute hike to the top. There are several sites related to the historic Buddhist priest and founder of Shingon Buddhism, Kōbō Daishi (774–835), including Daishō-in, near the top.

The island contains the Miyajima Natural Botanical Garden on its north coast.

People often take the short ferry ride from mainland Japan to pray at Miyajima's shrines and to marvel at the beauty of its forests. Shrines on the island include Senjokaku (Toyokuni Shrine), Five-storied Pagoda, Two-storied Pagoda, Kiyomori Shrine, and Omoto Shrine.

== Shrines and temples ==
In Japan, the term "shrine" implies a Shinto religious structure and "temple" implies a Buddhist one.

=== Itsukushima Shrine ===
Miyajima is famous for the Itsukushima Shrine, a Shinto shrine known for its "floating" torii gate. The historic shrine complex is listed as a UNESCO World Heritage Site, as well as one of the National Treasures by the Japanese government.

=== Daiganji Temple ===
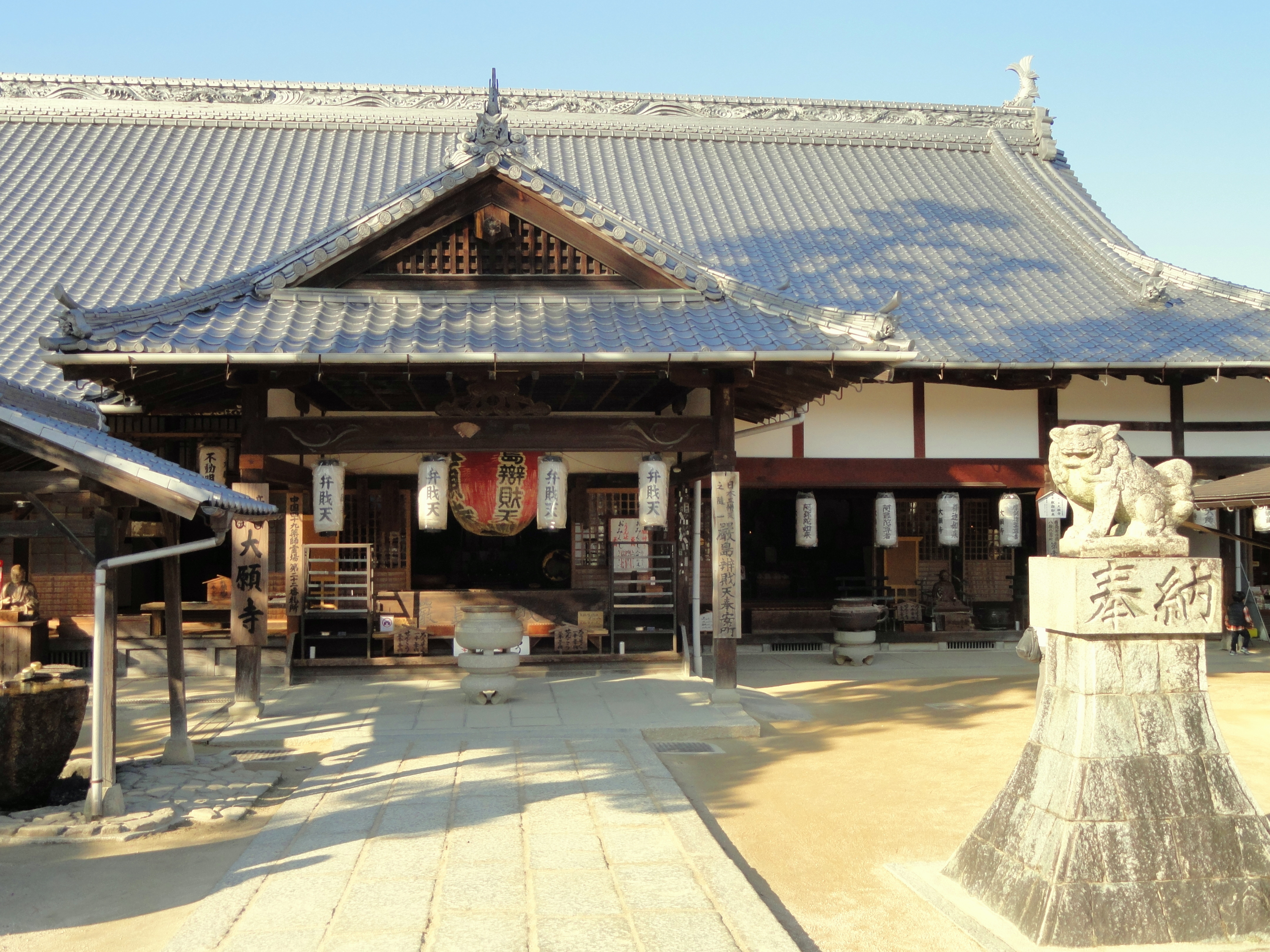
Daiganji Temple in Miyajima

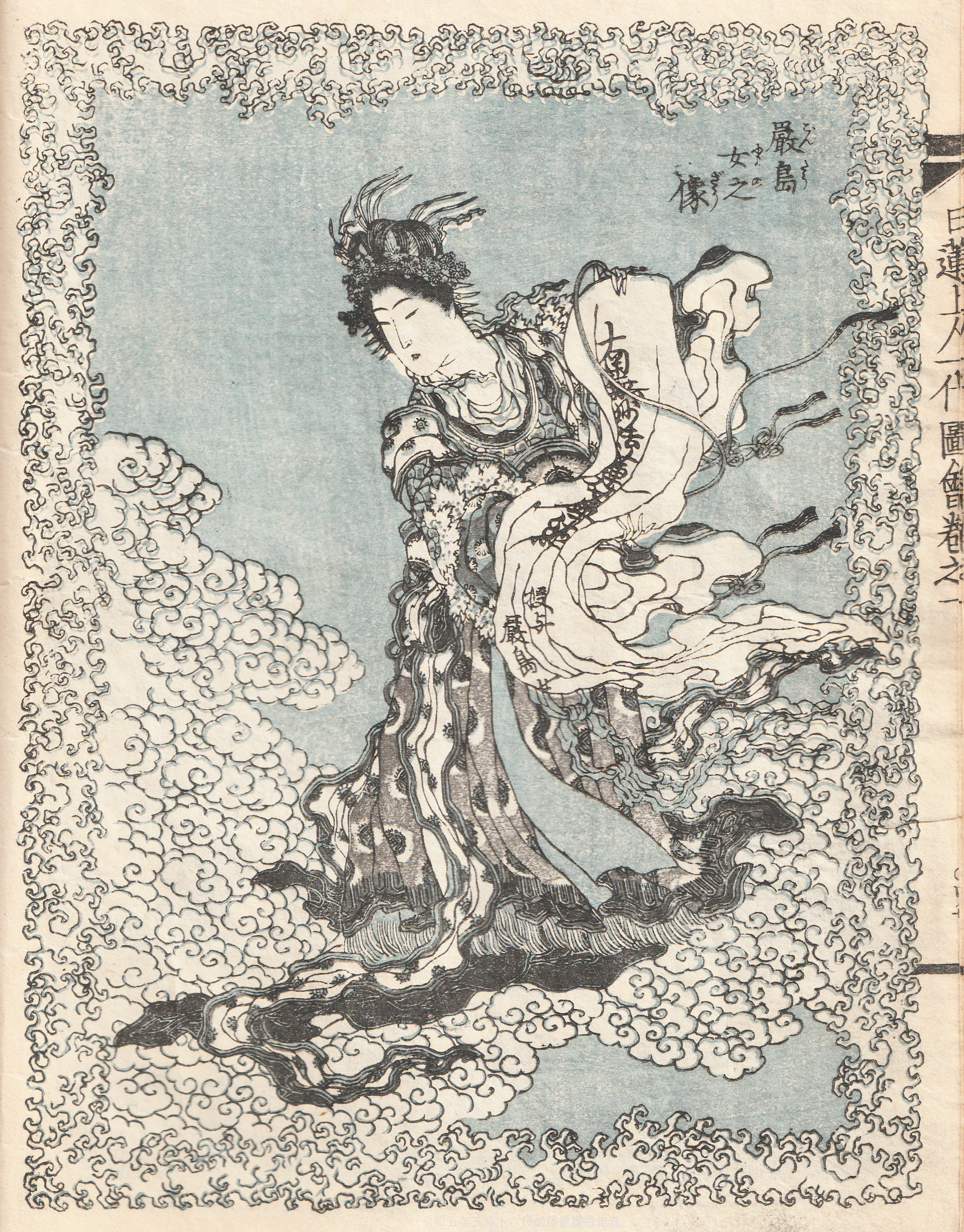
Itsukushima-Nyo or Benzaiten Goddess of Itsukushima Island.

Next to the Itsukushima Shrine is Daiganji Temple, dedicated to Goddess Benzaiten as well as three Buddhas important to Shingon Buddhism. Benzaiten Goddess in Japan has been traced to Goddess Saraswati of Hinduism in India. She is the Goddess of eloquence, music, arts, wealth and knowledge. The three Buddha in the temple are Gautama Buddha, Wisdom Buddha and Mercy Buddha.

Daiganji Temple is one of the three most famous Benzaiten Temples in Japan, along with Enoshima Benzaiten (Kanagawa) and Chikubujima Benzaiten (Shiga). The Benzaiten is opened to the public only once every year on June 17. On this day, Miyajima holds a big festival, and people of the region visit the temple to offer their prayers.

The precise date for the first construction of Daiganji Benzaiten temple is unclear. It was reconstructed around 1200 AD in the Kamakura period. The construction date of Itsukushima-jinja and Daiganji temple is estimated to be 6th century or later, and the existence of Itsukushima-jinja is confirmed by early 9th century by ancient Japanese texts. The Nihon Shoki confirms the sacredness of these Miyajama structures during the Heian Period (794-1184).

=== Daishō-in Temple ===
Daishō-in is a historic Japanese temple on Mount Misen, the holy mountain on the island. It is the 14th temple in the Chūgoku 33 Kannon Pilgrimage and famous for the maple trees and their autumn colors. It is also called "Suishō-ji". As the headquarters of the Omuro branch of Shingon Buddhism, it is the most important temple of Miyajima. The temple was the administrator of the Itsukushima shrine before Meiji Restoration forbade (Shinbutsu bunri) syncretism (Shinbutsu-shūgō) between Shinto and Buddhism in 1868.

=== Senjokaku (Toyokuni Shrine) ===
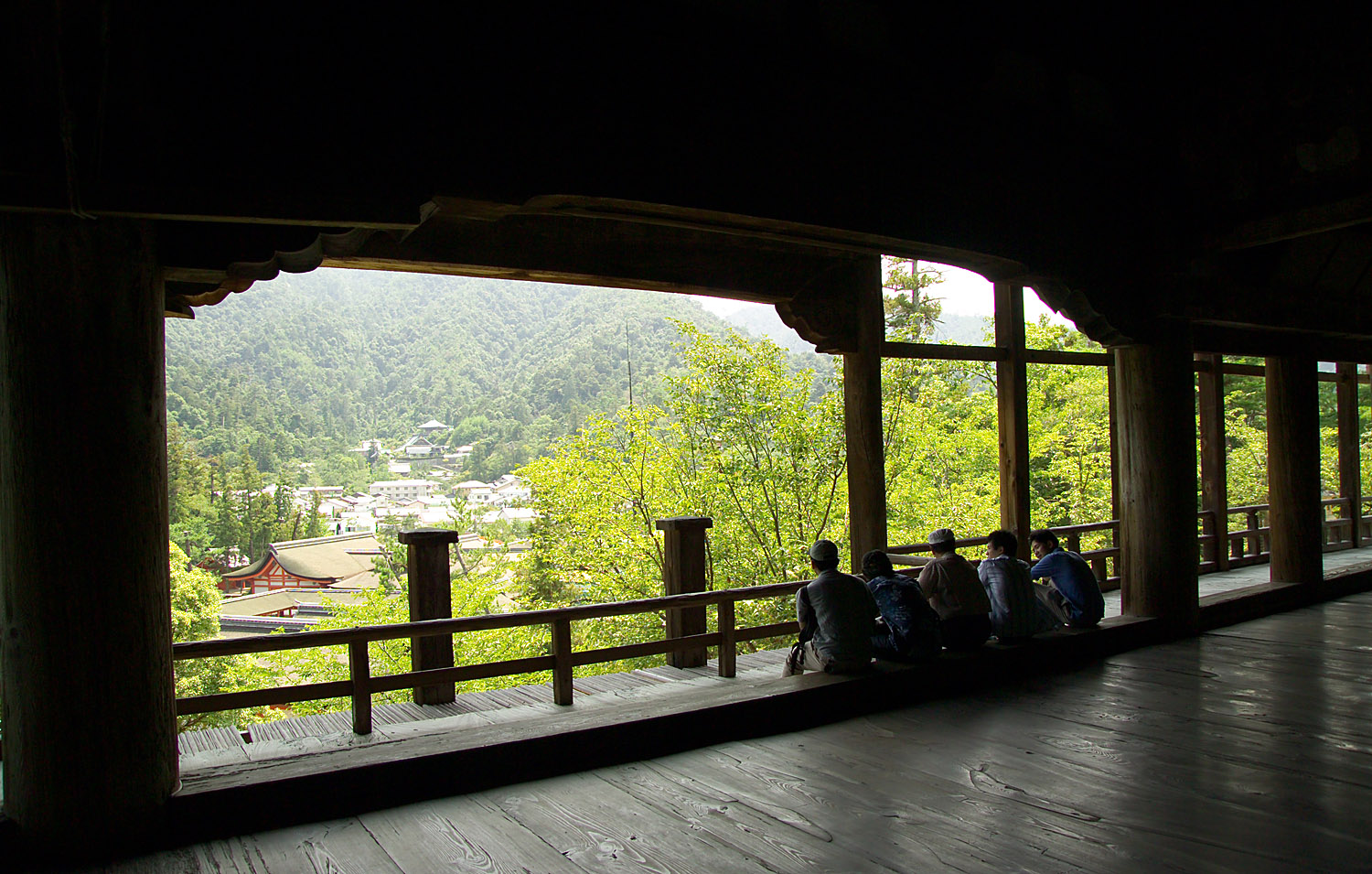
Toyotomi Hideyoshi's Senjō-kaku overlooks Taira no Kiyomori's Itsukushima Shrine

Senjokaku (lit. "pavilion of 1000 mats") is the largest structure at Miyajima Island as the name implies. Toyotomi Hideyoshi started construction of Senjokaku as a Buddhist library in which the chanting of Senbu-kyo sutras could be held for fallen soldiers. Hideyoshi died in 1598 and the building was never fully completed. Originally, Amitabha Buddha and two Buddhist saints, Ānanda and Mahākāśyapa, were enshrined in the structure until the Meiji reformation. Then, the structure was converted into a Shinto shrine dedicated to Toyotomi Hideyoshi. Numerous votive picture tablets that had been hanging in the Itsukushima Shrine buildings until the Meiji era, have been hung on the walls inside the hall.

=== Five-storied Pagoda (Gojunoto) ===
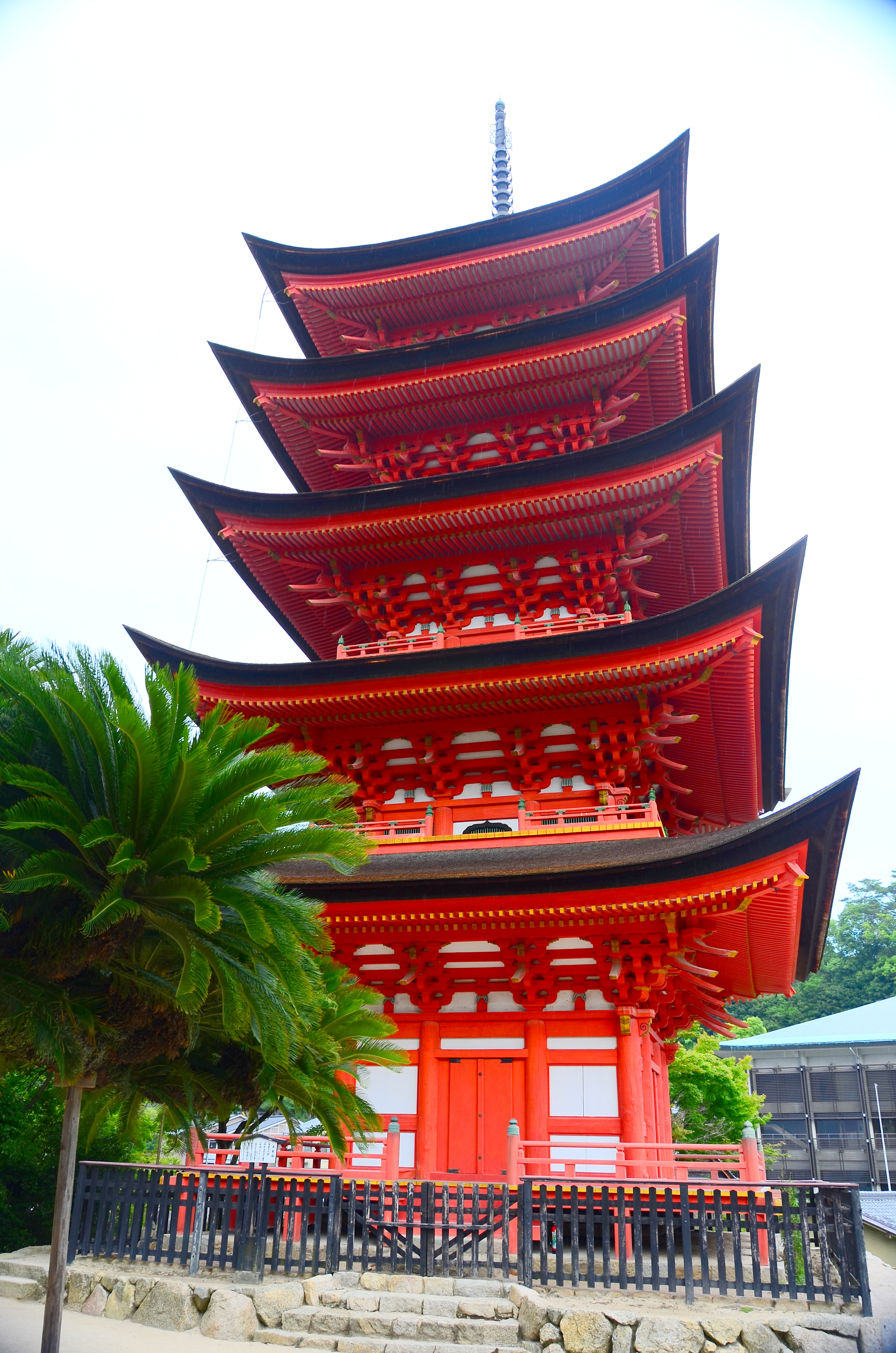
Five-Tiered Pagoda at Itsukushima Shrine

The nearby Five-storied Pagoda constructed in 1407 (thus predating Senjokaku) enshrined Yakushi Nyorai Zazo, the Buddha of Medicine said to have been made by Kobo Daishi himself, accompanied by Fugen Bosatsu (Mercy Buddha) and Monju Bosatsu (Wisdom Buddha). The three images were moved to the Daiganji Temple during the Meiji reformation.

== Gallery ==
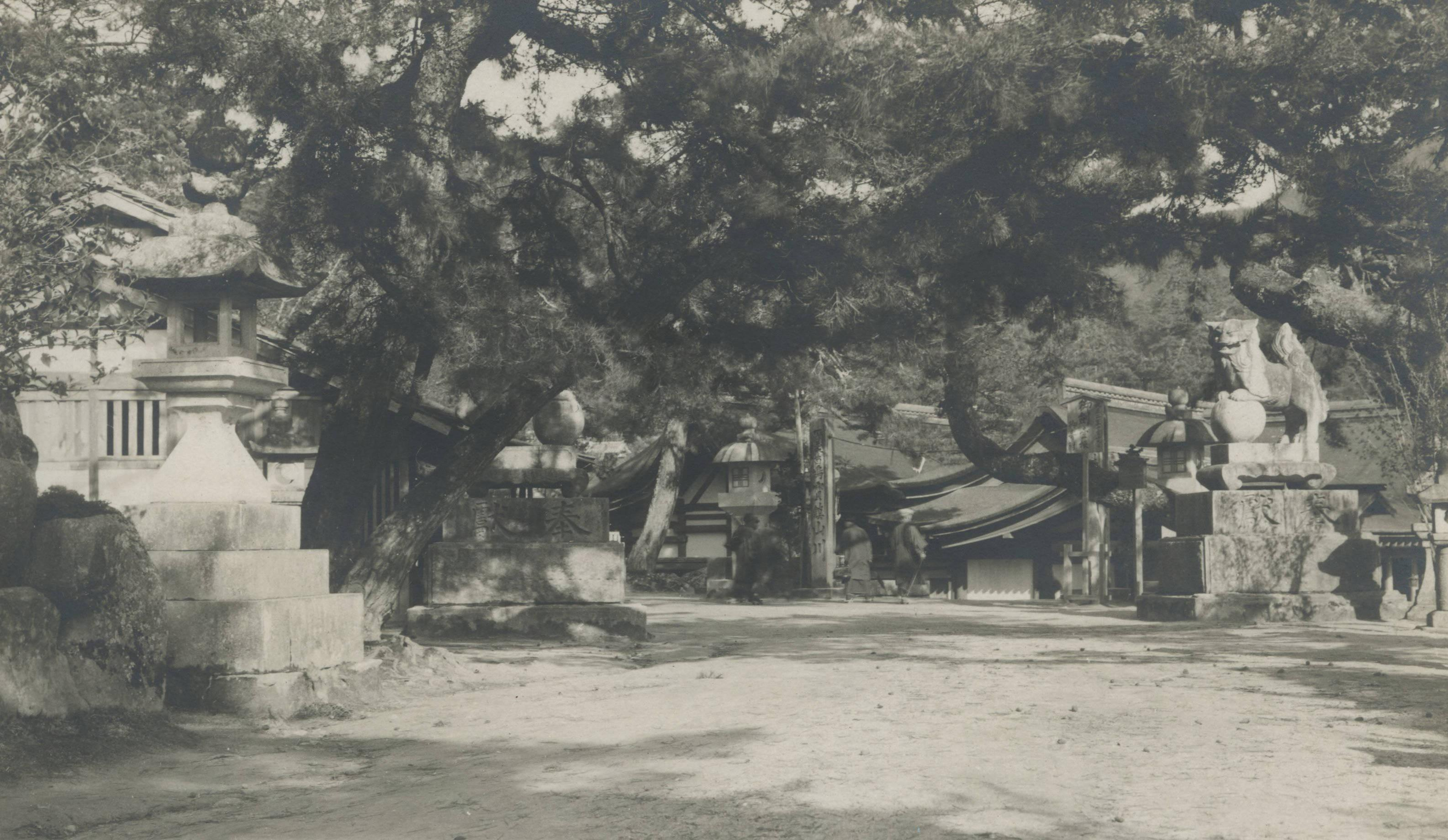
Miyajima in 1913

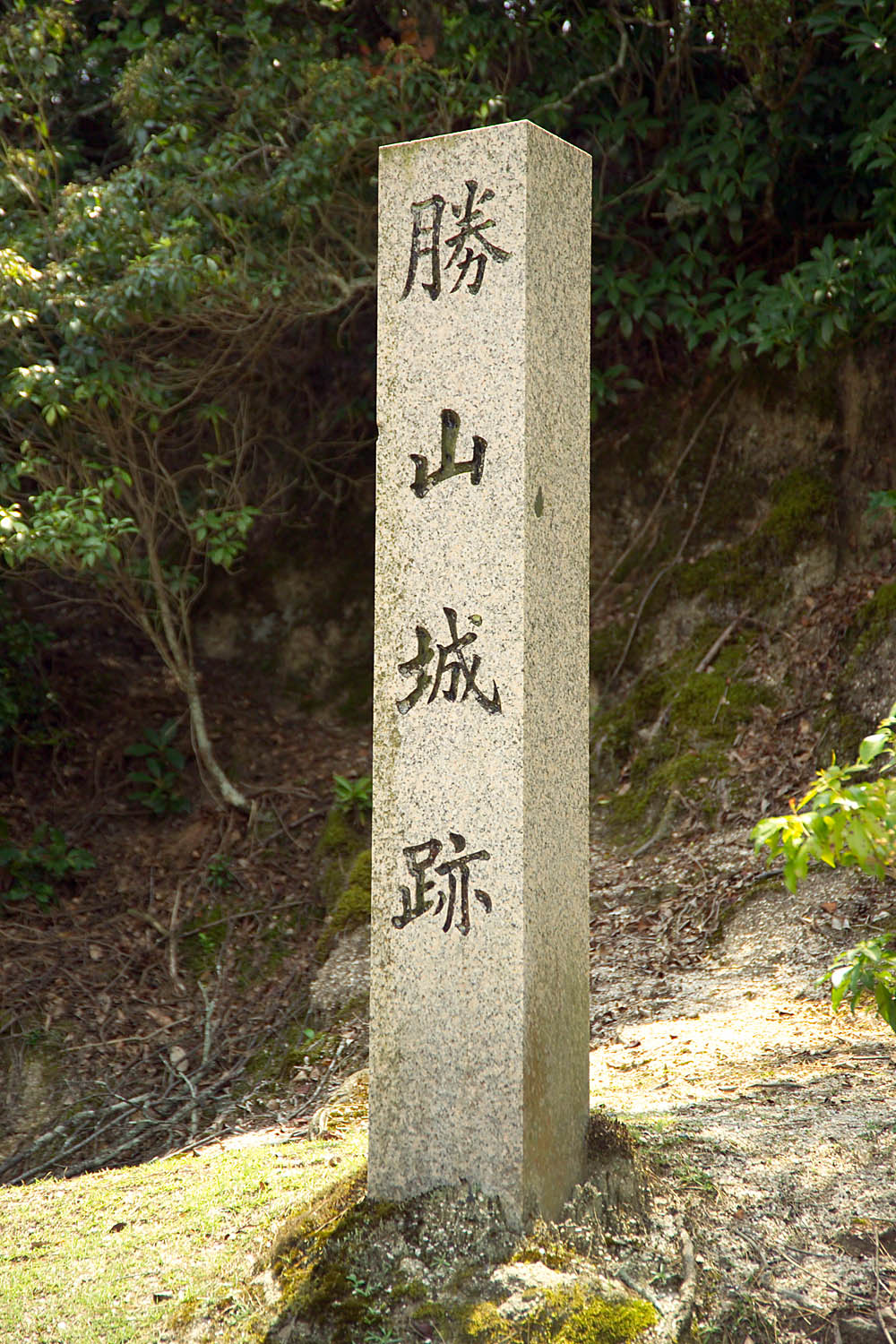
Katsuyama Castle once stood on this site

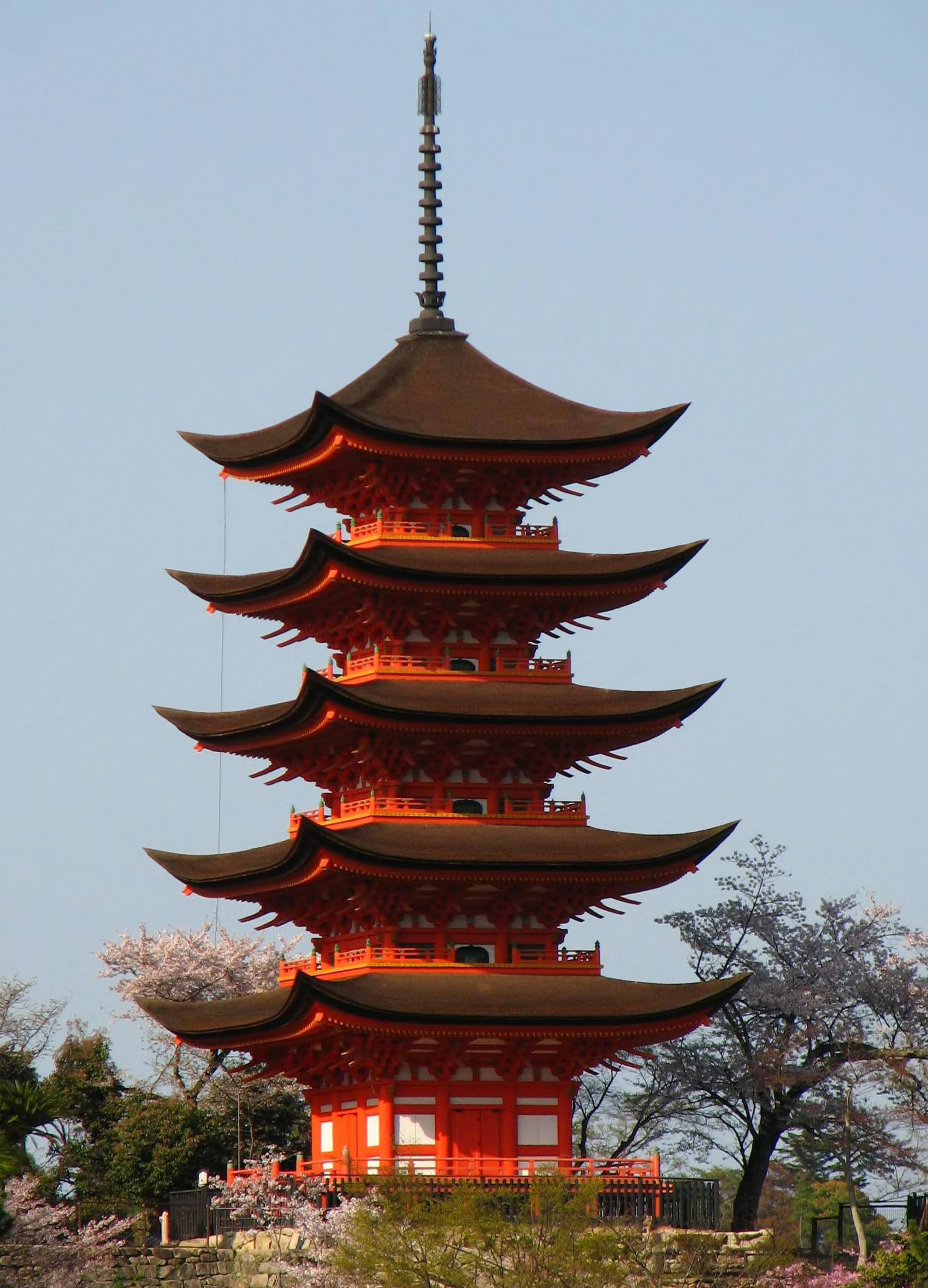
Goju-no-to Pagoda from Senjō-kaku Temple

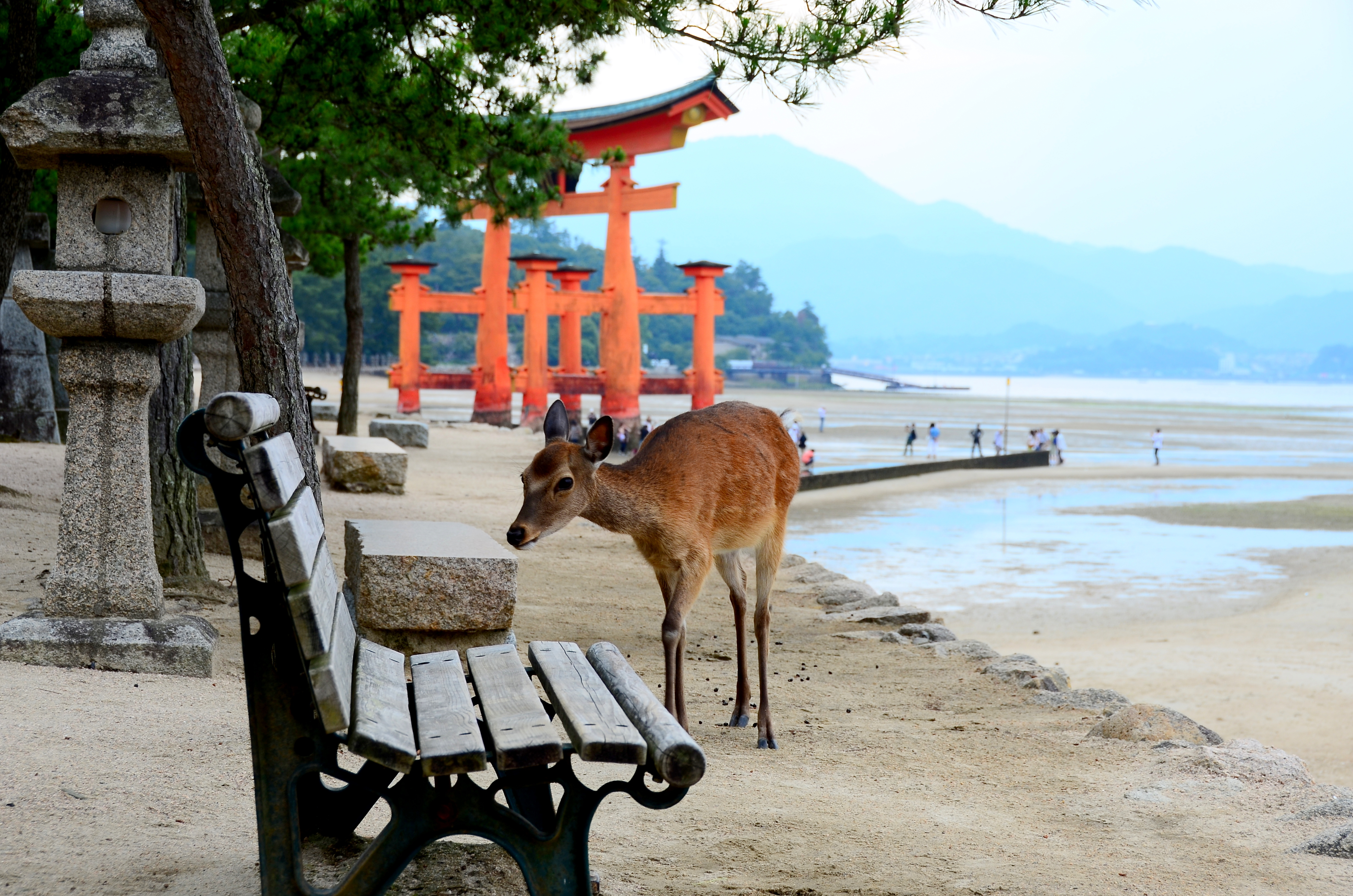
Deer near the torii gate

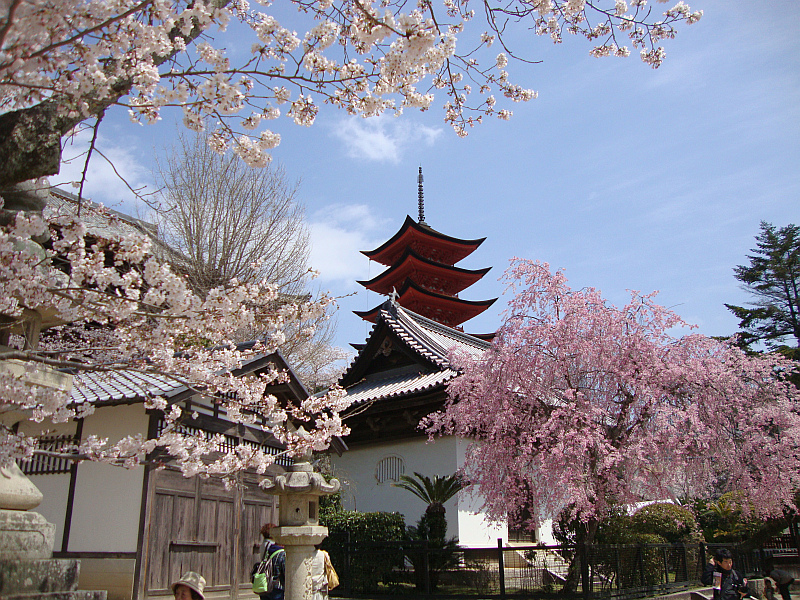
Cherry blossoms near Senjokaku Temple

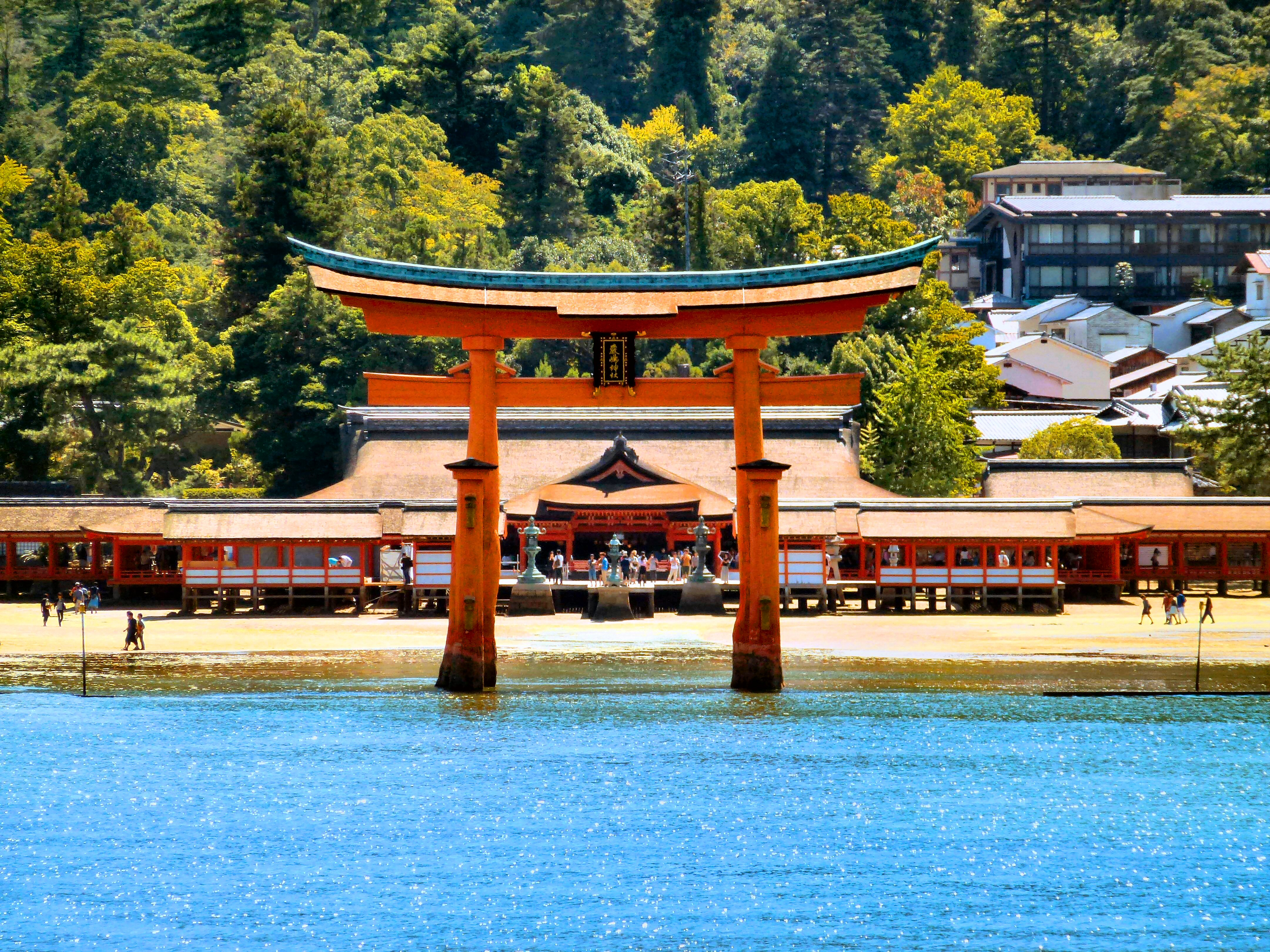
Itsukushima shrine taken from water with gate (tori) in foreground

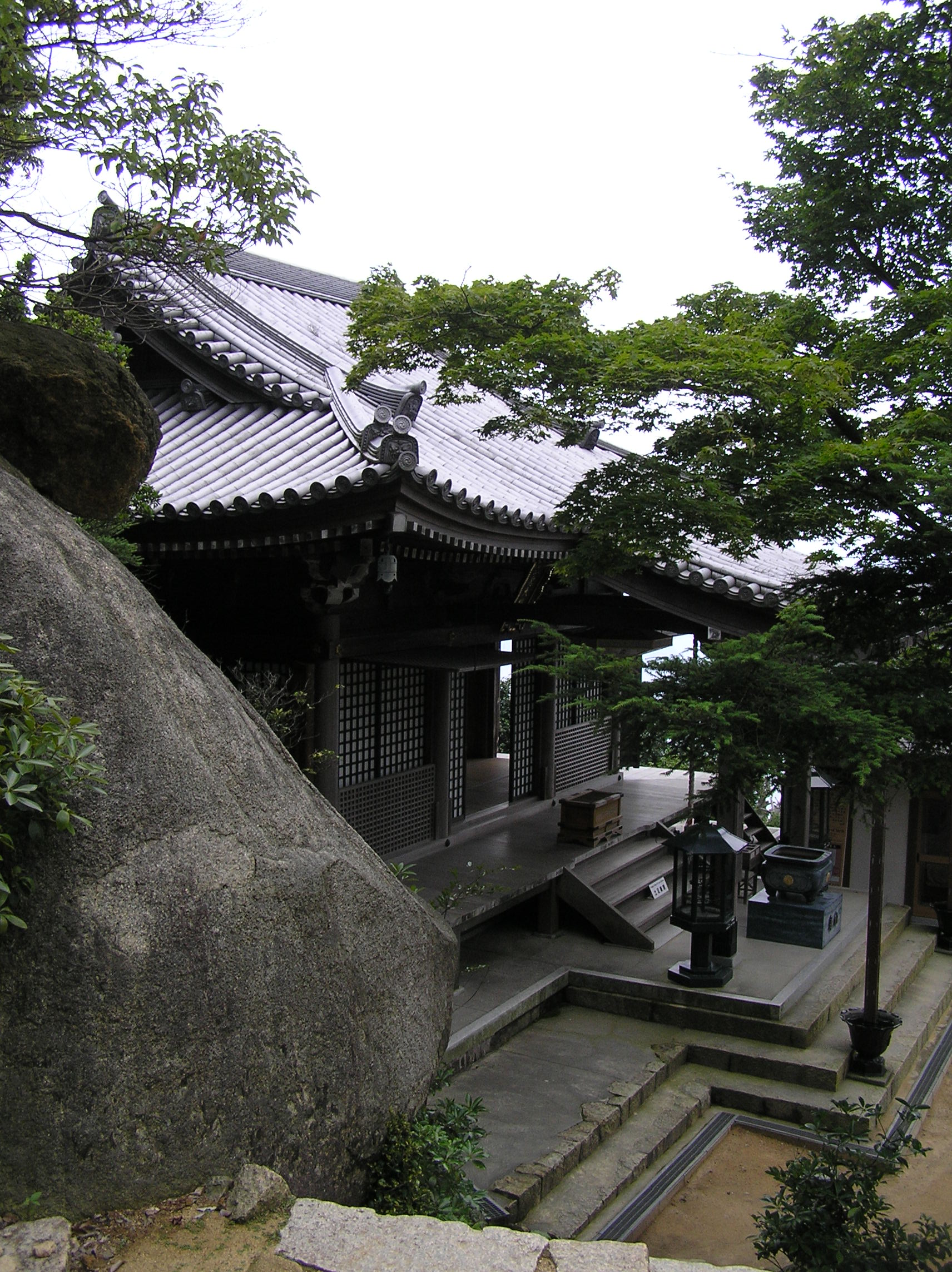
Sanki-gongen-dō temple near the summit of Mount Misen

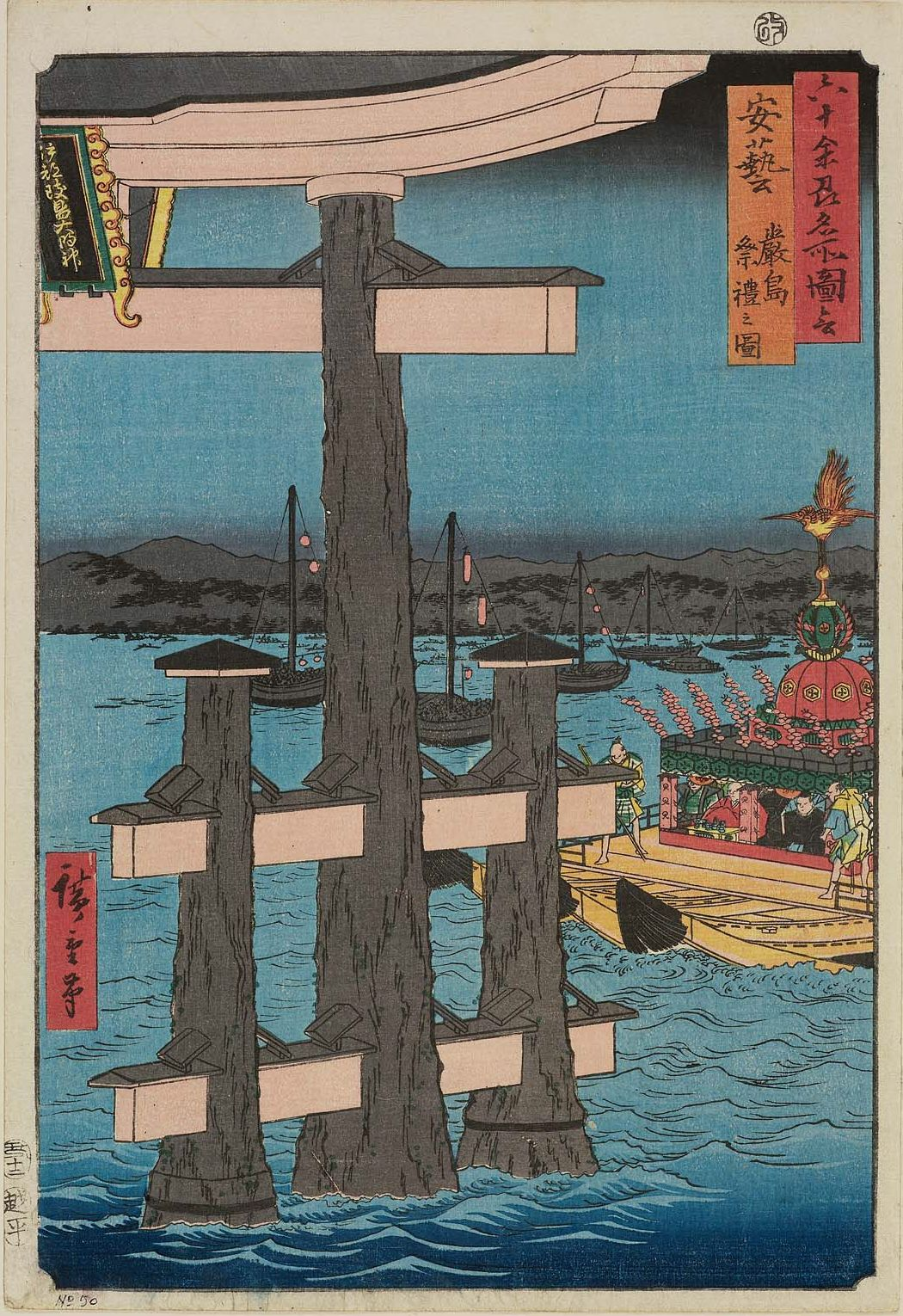
Hiroshige

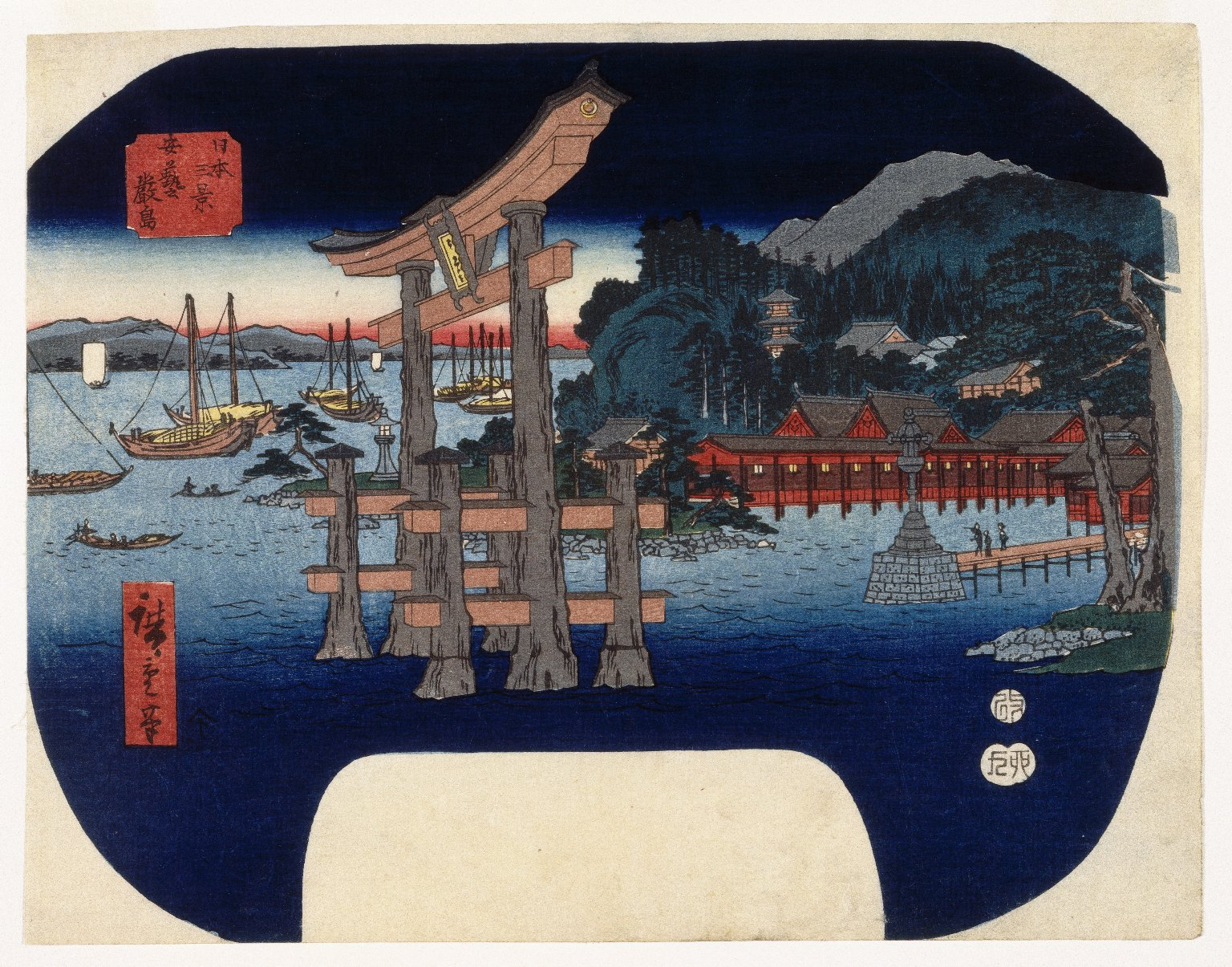
Hiroshige

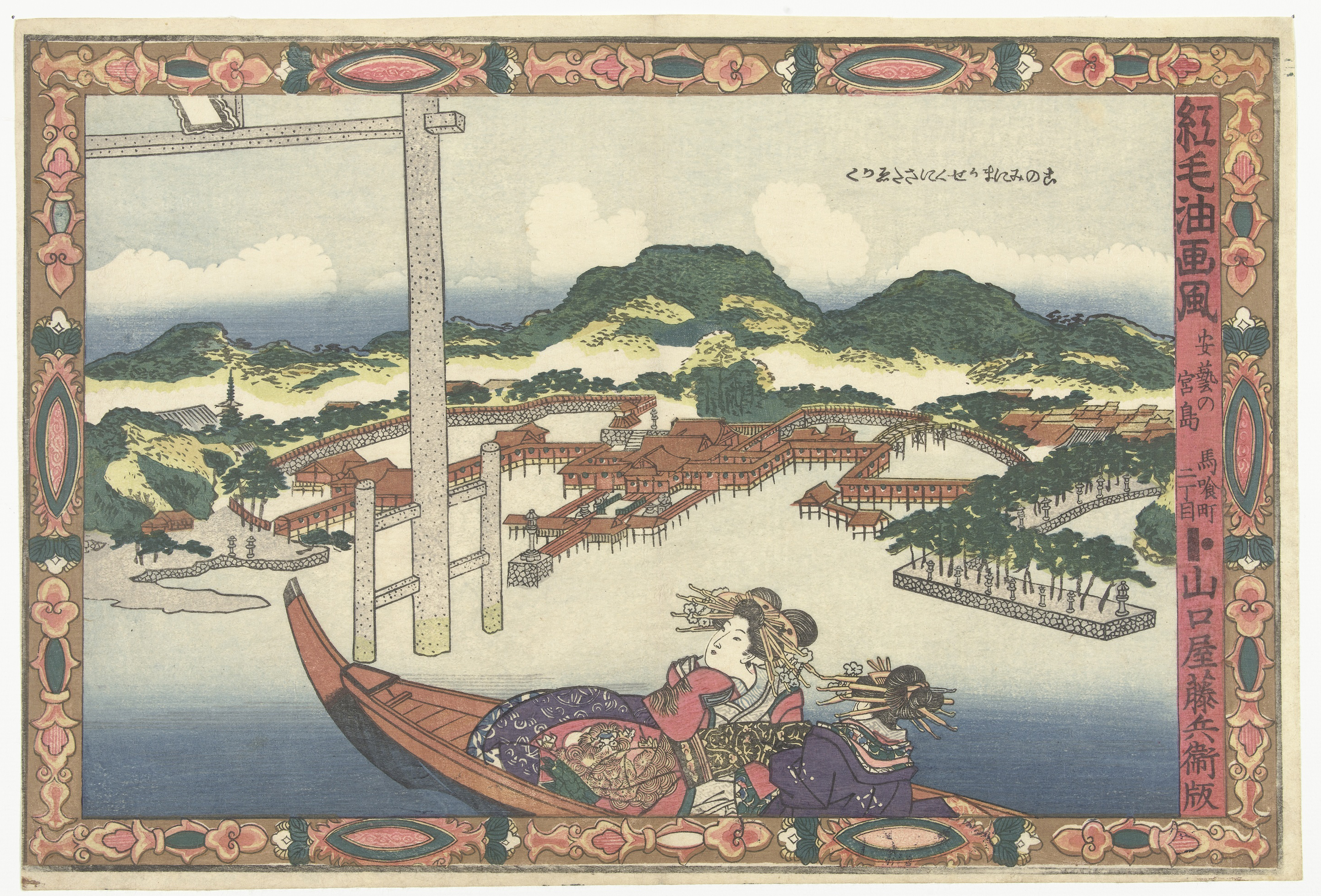
Kunisada

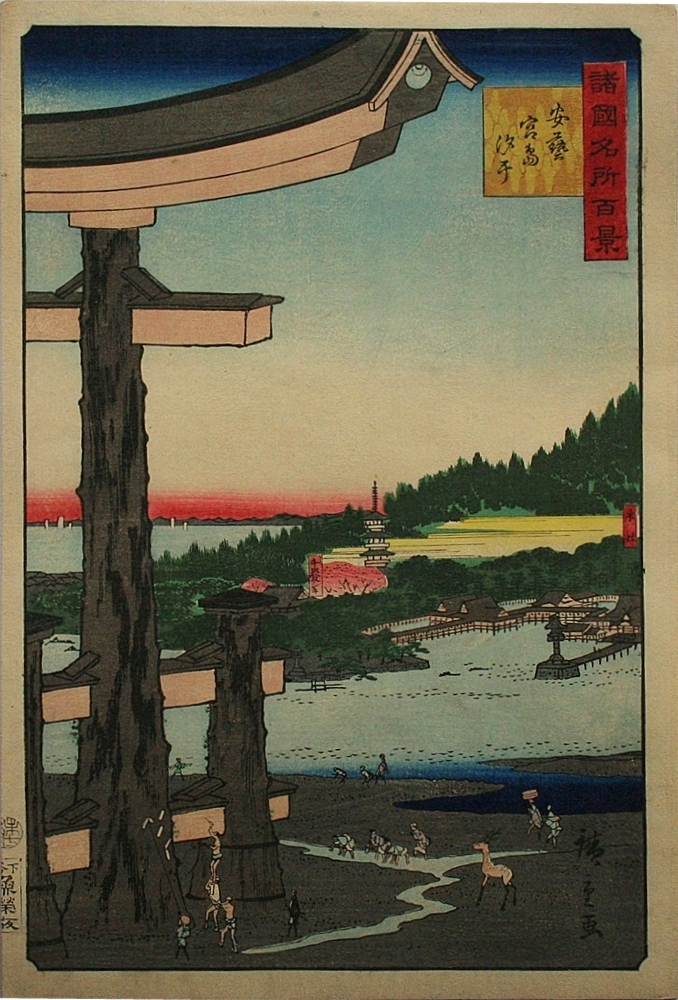
Hiroshige II

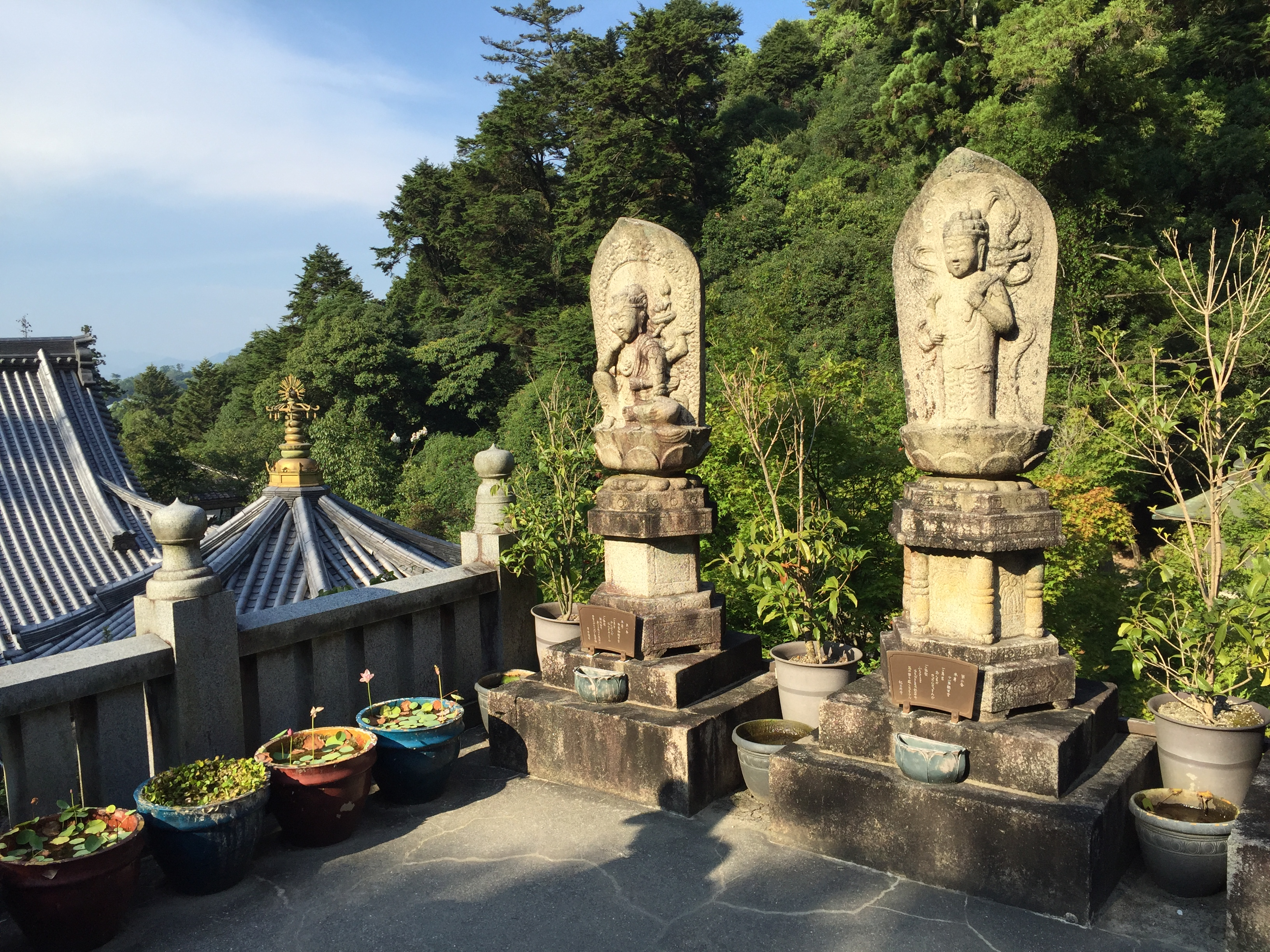
Miniature Lotus flowers at Daisho-in Miyajima

== See also ==
- Battle of Itsukushima
- Daishō-in
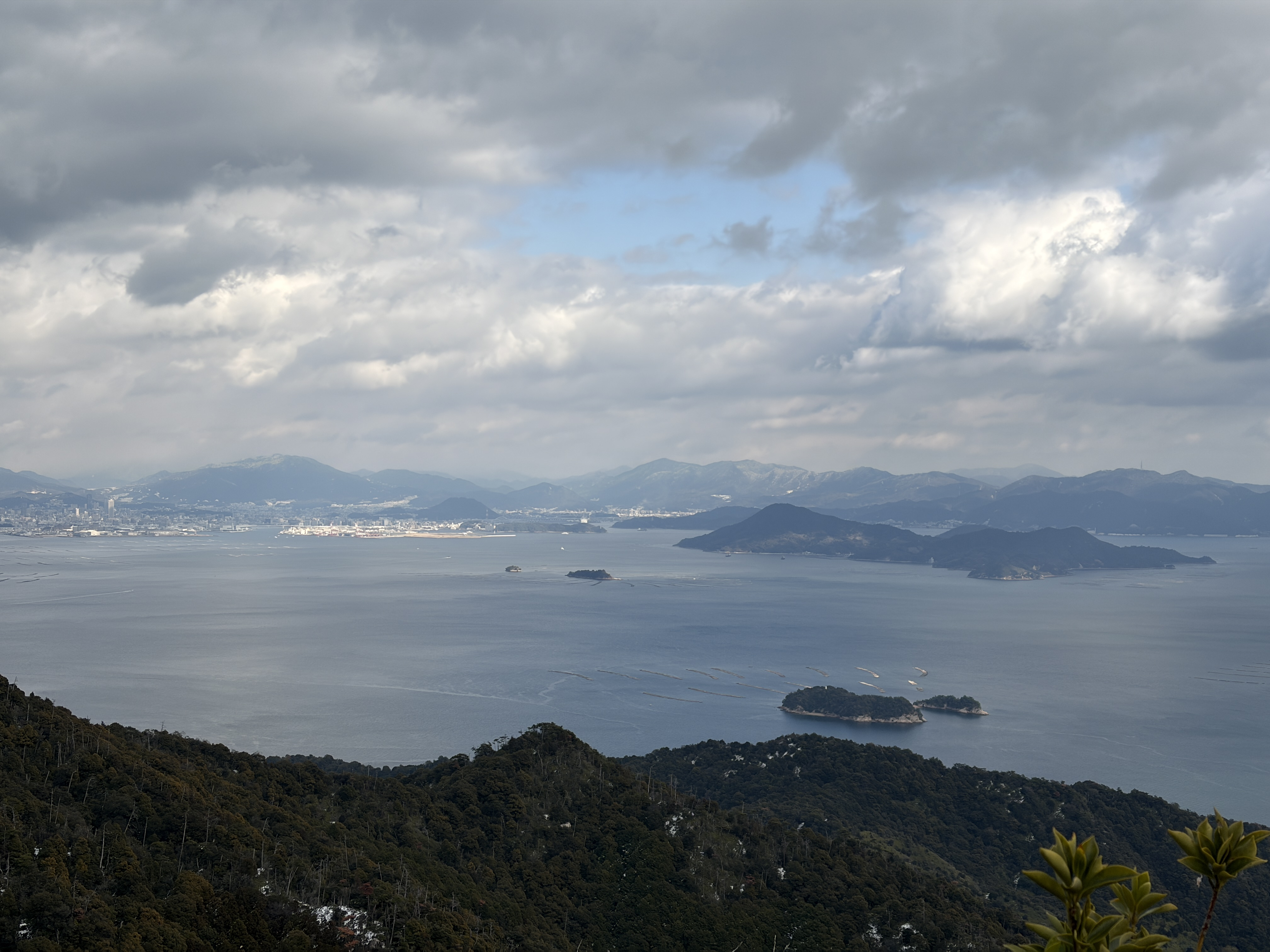
- View from Mt. Misen, Miyajama in 2026
  List of Special Places of Scenic Beauty, Special Historic Sites and Special Natural Monuments
- Itsukushima - two Imperial Japanese Navy ships named after the site
- Marine Plaza Miyajima
- Miyajima, Hiroshima
- Miyao Castle
- Momijidani Park
- Mount Misen
- Setonaikai National Park
- Taira no Kiyomori
- Three Views of Japan
- Tourism in Japan
- World Heritage Site
