= Momijidani Park =

Park in Japan

Coordinates: 34.294191°N 132.324057°E

- Location within Japan
- Location: Miyajima, Hatsukaichi, Hiroshima

Momijidani Park (紅葉谷公園, Momijidani-Kōen) is one of the most famous maple leaves valley parks in Japan. The park is located at the foot of Mt. Misen, along Momijidani River, behind Itsukushima Shrine in Miyajima, Hatsukaichi, Hiroshima. There are more than 200 maples, including 110 Acer palmatum thunberg, 60 Palmatum var. matsumurae, 10 Acer rufinerve, Acer buergerianum, Acer sieboldianum miquel and Acer amoenum carriere var. amoenum.

== See also ==
- Itsukushima
- Itsukushima Shrine
- Mt. Misen
- Setonaikai National Park
