= Miyajima Ropeway =

Coordinates: 34°17′4.2″N 132°19′41.3″E

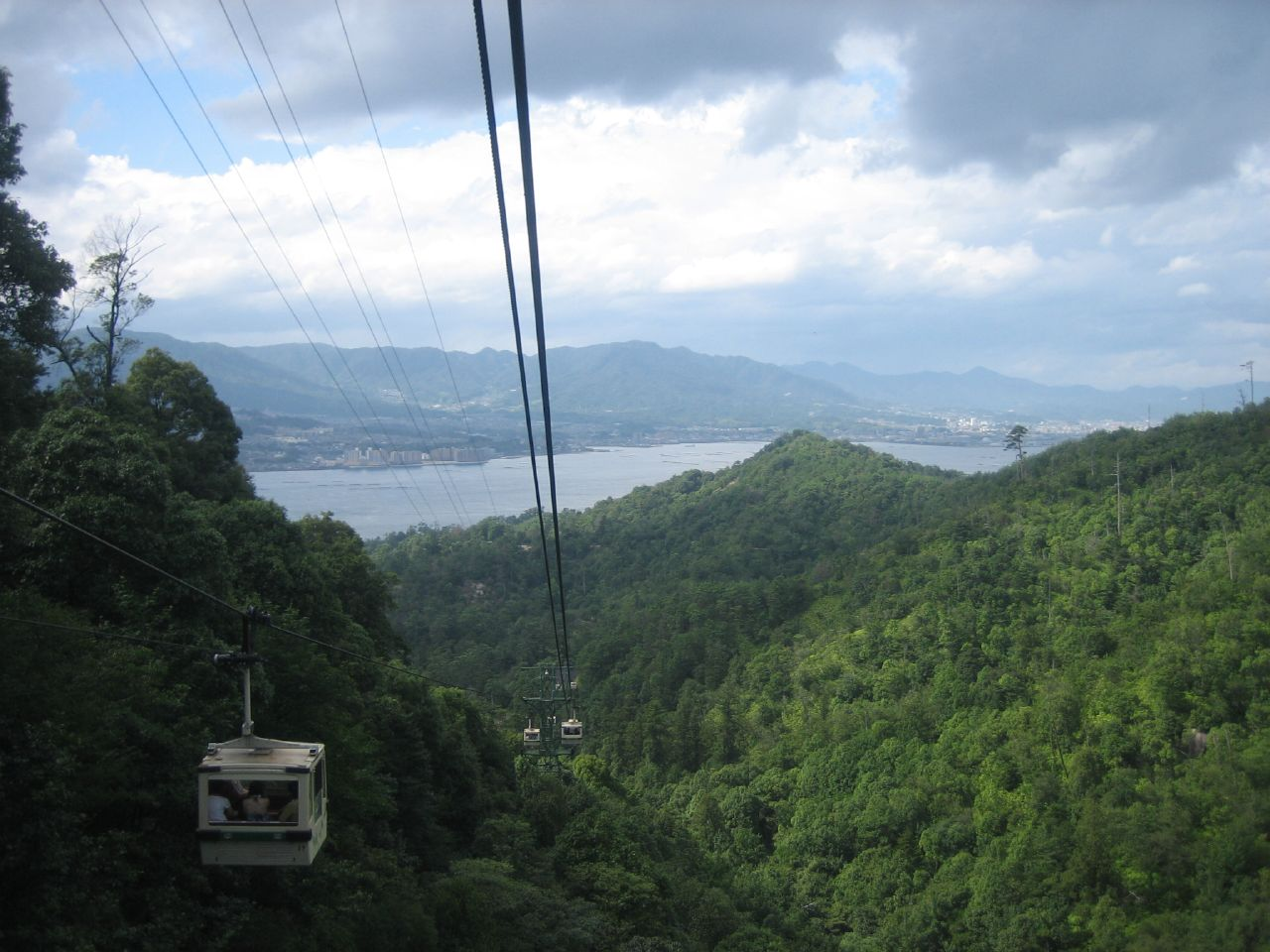
Miyajima Ropeway, Momijidani Line.

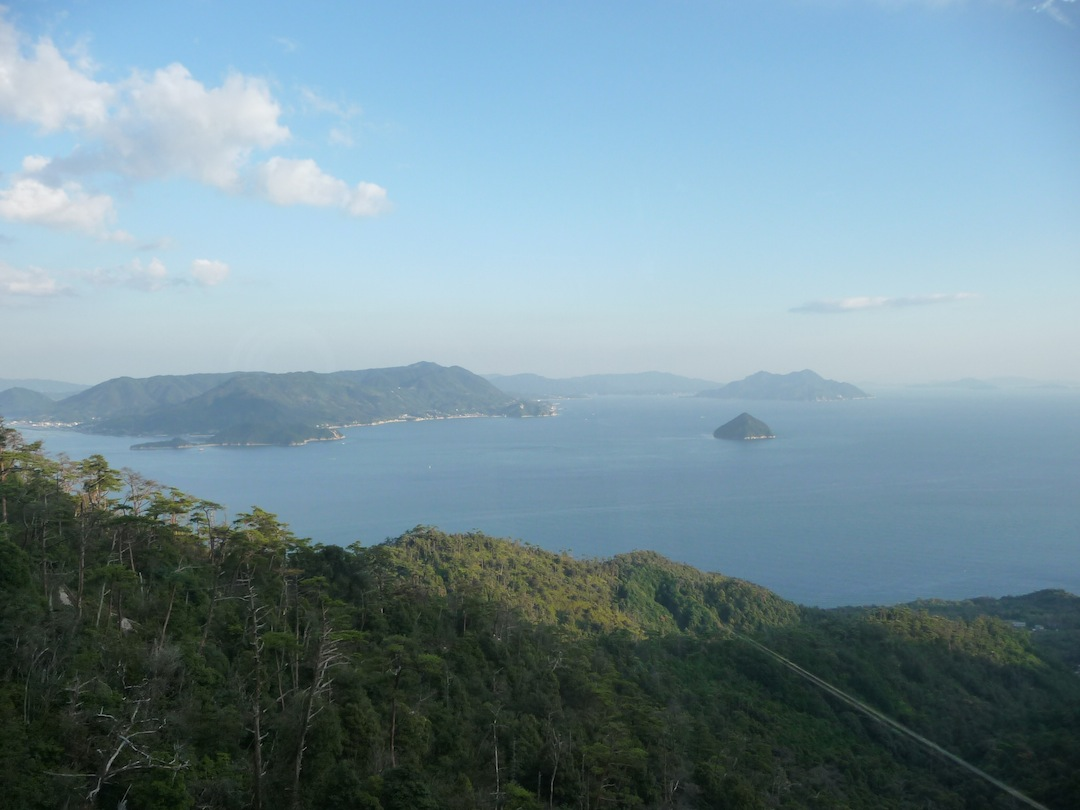
A view down from Miyajima Ropeway Aerial Tramway Section beyond Kayatani station

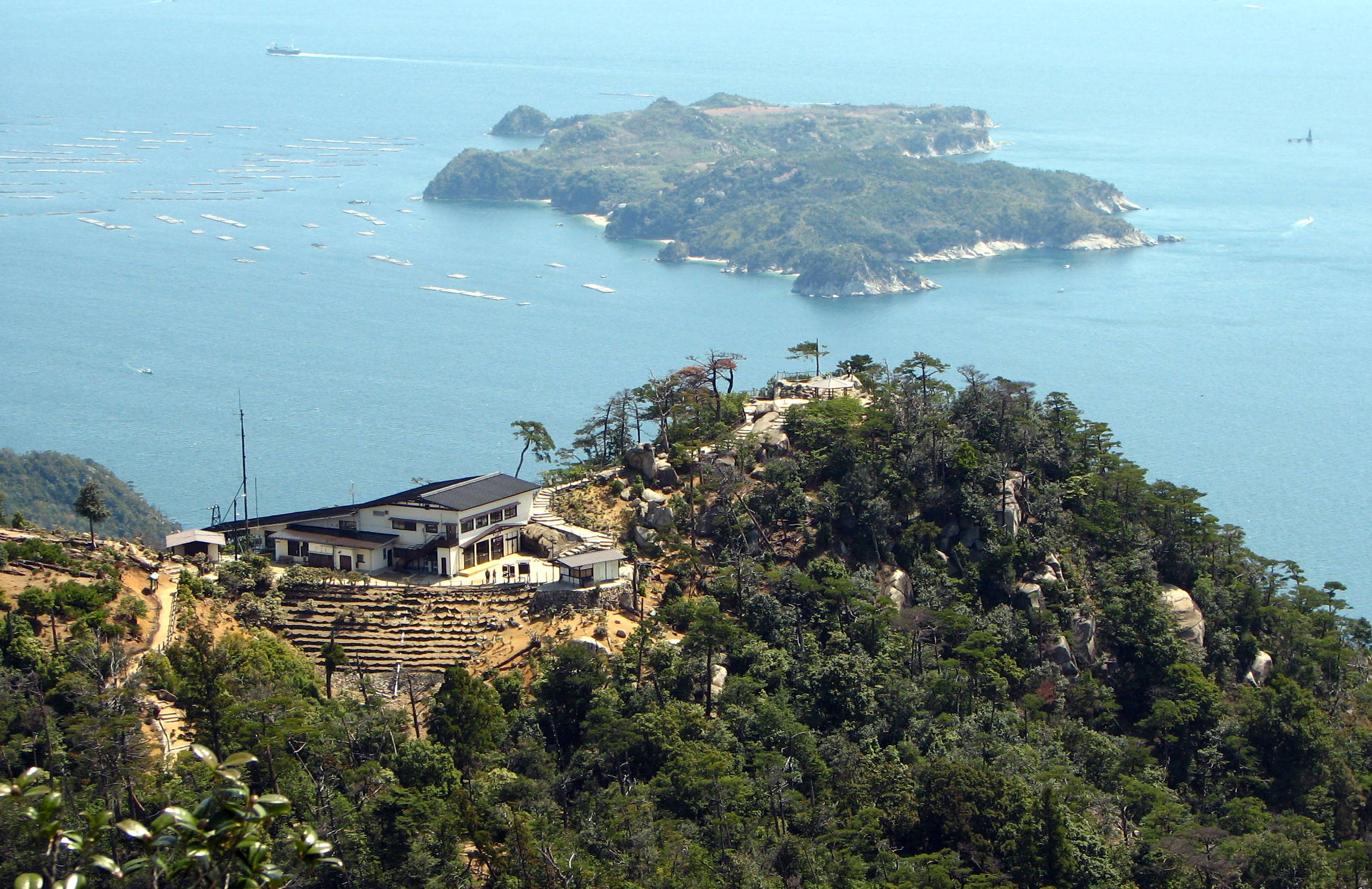
Miyajima Ropeway Station on Mount Misen

The Miyajima Ropeway (宮島ロープウエー, Miyajima Rōpuuē) refers to Japanese aerial lift lines in Hatsukaichi, Hiroshima. This is the only route Hiroshima Tourism Promoting (広島観光開発, Hiroshima Kankō Kaihatsu) operates. This company is a subsidiary of Hiroshima Electric Railway. The route, consisted of two lines, climbs Mount Misen of Miyajima Island. It opened in 1959. The route accepts PASPY, a smart card ticketing system.

== Basic data ==
=== Momijidani Line ===
- System: Gondola lift, 3 cables
- Distance: 1.1 kilometres (0.7 mi)
- Vertical interval: 288 m (945 ft)
- Maximum gradient: 26°24′
- Operational speed: 2.0 m/s
- Passenger capacity per a cabin: 8
- Cabins: 22
- Stations: 2
- Time required for single ride: 10 minutes

=== Shishiiwa Line ===
- System: Aerial tramway, 3 cables
- Distance: 0.5 kilometres (0.3 mi)
- Vertical interval: 62 m (203 ft)
- Maximum gradient: 15°13′
- Operational speed: 3.6 m/s
- Passenger capacity per a cabin: 30
- Cabins: 2
- Stations: 2
- Time required for single ride: 3.5 minutes

== See also ==
- List of aerial lifts in Japan
