= PASPY =

Contactless smart card system in Hiroshima Prefecture, Japan

Various PASPY cards

PASPY (パスピー, Pasupī) was a rechargeable contactless smart card ticketing system for public transit in Hiroshima Prefecture, Japan. Its name is a portmanteau of pass, happy, and speedy. Like other electronic fare collection systems in Japan, the card used an RFID technology developed by Sony known as FeliCa, but was the first card to employ an 8 KB capacity instead of the standard 4, owing to the need for more capacity to interoperate with the Hiroshima bus system.

PASPY IC card service ended in March 2025 and was replaced with MOBIRY DAYS and ICOCA.

== History ==
The system was conceived as an alternative to the magnetic fare system in place since 1994, which by 2008 was already beginning to show signs of wear; machines were needing to be replaced and customers preferred IC cards over magnetic fare cards. The PASPY card launched with eight issuing companies, each with their own uniquely colored card, on January 26, 2008.

On March 1, 2008, the PASPY system also began accepting JR West's ICOCA card (without allowing reciprocal use of PASPY at ICOCA terminals). This was seen as an expedient way to avoid having to obtain agreement from the entire ICOCA service area to have local campaigns and promotional discounts to entice Hiroshima residents to use the PASPY card, while still allowing for travelers from outside the area to use the more widely accepted ICOCA card and visit Hiroshima without having to purchase a PASPY.

Subsequently on March 17, 2018, Nationwide Mutual Usage IC cards became accepted for usage in the PASPY area.

The Kure City Transportation Bureau version of PASPY ceased to be sold on April 1, 2012. The Bihoku Kōtsū version ceased sales on September 30, 2014, while Geiyō Bus suspended sales the following day. Hiroshima Rapid Transit ceased sales of PASPY on May 31, 2024, and will stop accepting usage of the cards on the Astram Line on November 30, 2024. After this date, only six color varieties of new PASPY cards were sold.

PASPY service was fully discontinued on March 29, 2025. Refunds will remain available until March 31, 2027.

== Operators accepting PASPY ==
Those with a color in the "Card color" column issue their own version of the cards, while others just accept them.

Card color	Operator	Sales period	Mode of transport
Light green	Hiroshima Electric Railway (Hiroden)	Ended March 2025	Railway (tram), bus
Yellow	Hiroshima Rapid Transit (Astram Line)	Ended May 2024	Railway (people mover)
	Hiroshima Tourism Promoting (Miyajima Ropeway)		Railway (aerial tramway)
Pink	Hiroshima Bus	Ended March 2025	Bus
Orange	Hiroshima Kōtsū (Hirokō Bus)	Ended March 2025	Bus
Dark blue	Geiyō Bus	Ended October 2014	Bus
Blue	Chūgoku JR Bus	Ended March 2025	Bus
Light blue	Bihoku Kōtsū	Ended September 2014	Bus
Green	Tomotetsudou (Tomotetsu Bus)	Ended March 2025	Bus
Purple	Kure City Transportation Bureau	Ended March 2012	Bus
	HD Nishi-Hiroshima (Bon-Bus)		Bus
	Daiichi Taxi		Bus
	Hirokō Kankō		Bus
Dark Green	Chūgoku Bus	Ended March 2025	Bus
	Setonaikai Kisen		Ship (ferry and cruise ship)
	Miyajima Matsudai Kisen		Ship (ferry)
