= Mount Misen =

Mountain in Hiroshima Prefecture, Japan

- 弥山
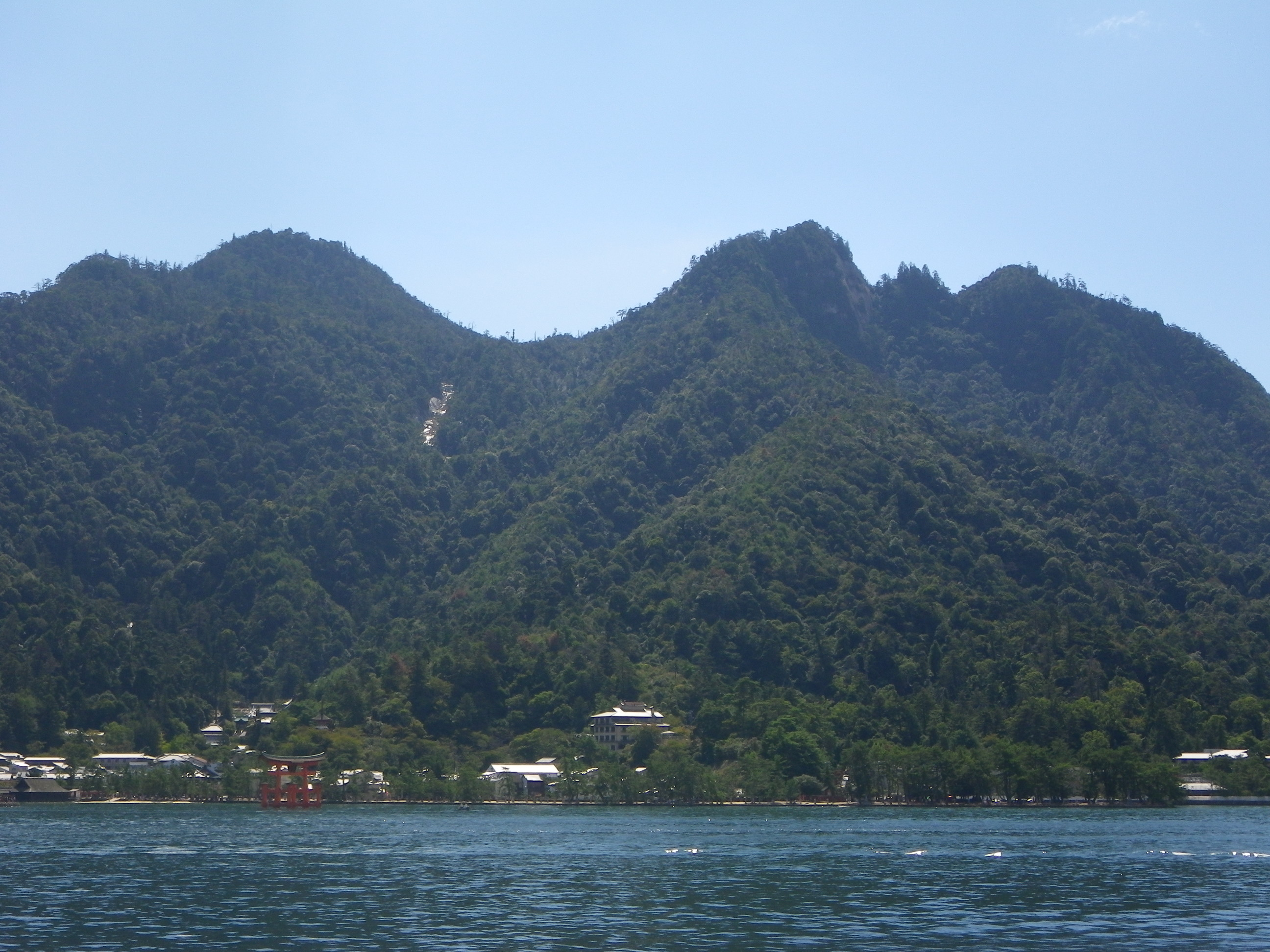

Highest point
- Elevation: 535 m (1,755 ft)
- Coordinates: 34°16′57″N 132°18′56″E

Geography
- Location within Japan
- Location: Miyajima, Hatsukaichi, Hiroshima, Japan

Geology
- Mountain type: Igneous rock

Climbing
- Easiest route: Aerial tramway

Mount Misen (弥山, Misen) is the sacred mountain on Itsukushima in Hatsukaichi, Hiroshima, Japan, and is the highest mountain on the island at 535 m; it is situated within the World Heritage area of Itsukushima Shrine.

The sea around the island (Seto Inland Sea) and all of the island are within Setonaikai National Park.

The north side of the mountain is covered by primeval forest which is protected by Hiroshima prefecture. The foot of the mountain has Momijidani-Kōen (紅葉谷公園, Maple Valley Park).

According to the website of Miyajima Tourist Association, Mount Misen was visited by Kūkai in the year 806, the 1st year of the Daidō era. Since ancient times, the mountain has been an important destination for religious visitors.

== Seven Wonders of Misen ==
The Seven Wonders of Misen, which come from ancient tales, are as follows:

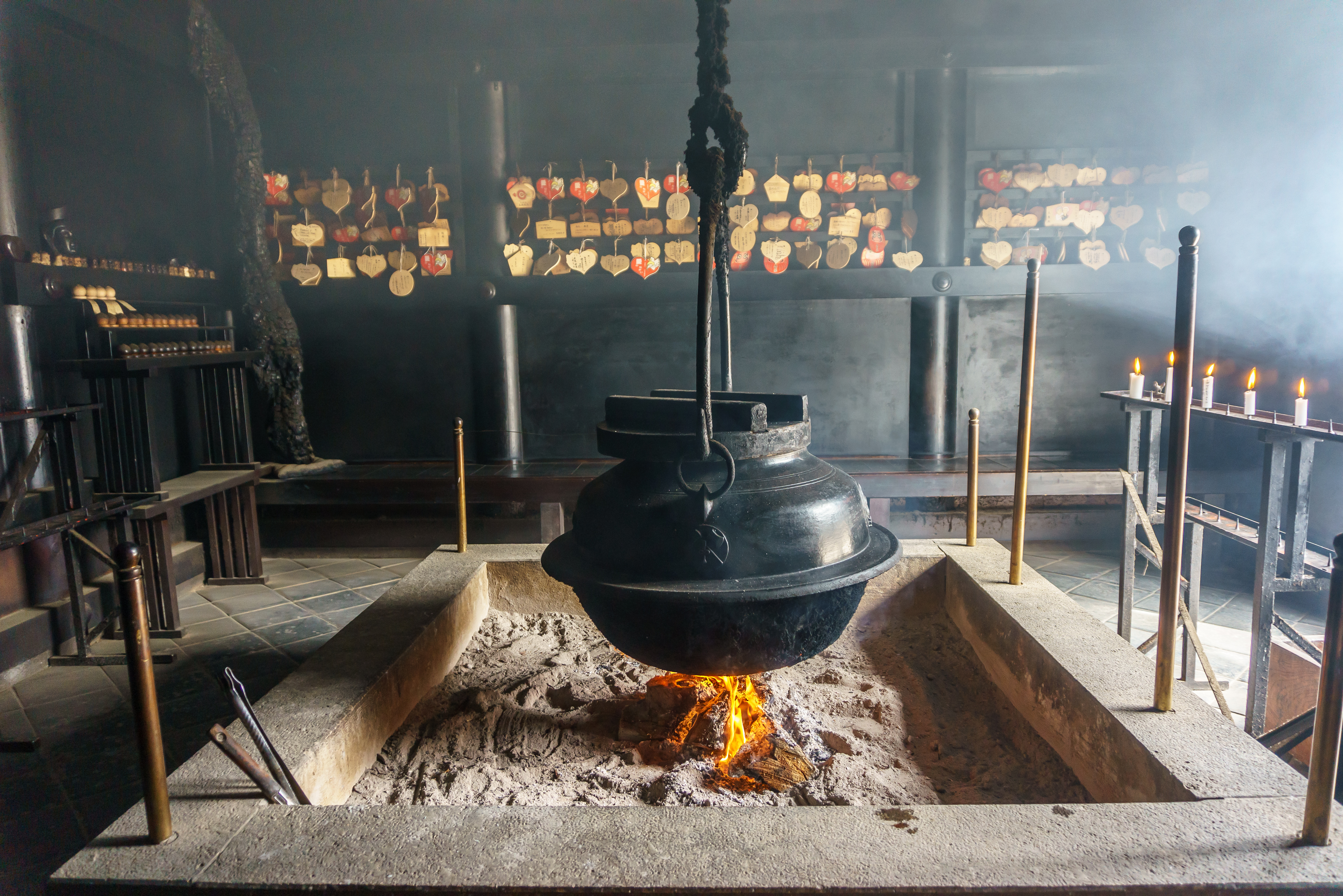
Kiezu-no-hi (The eternal flame)

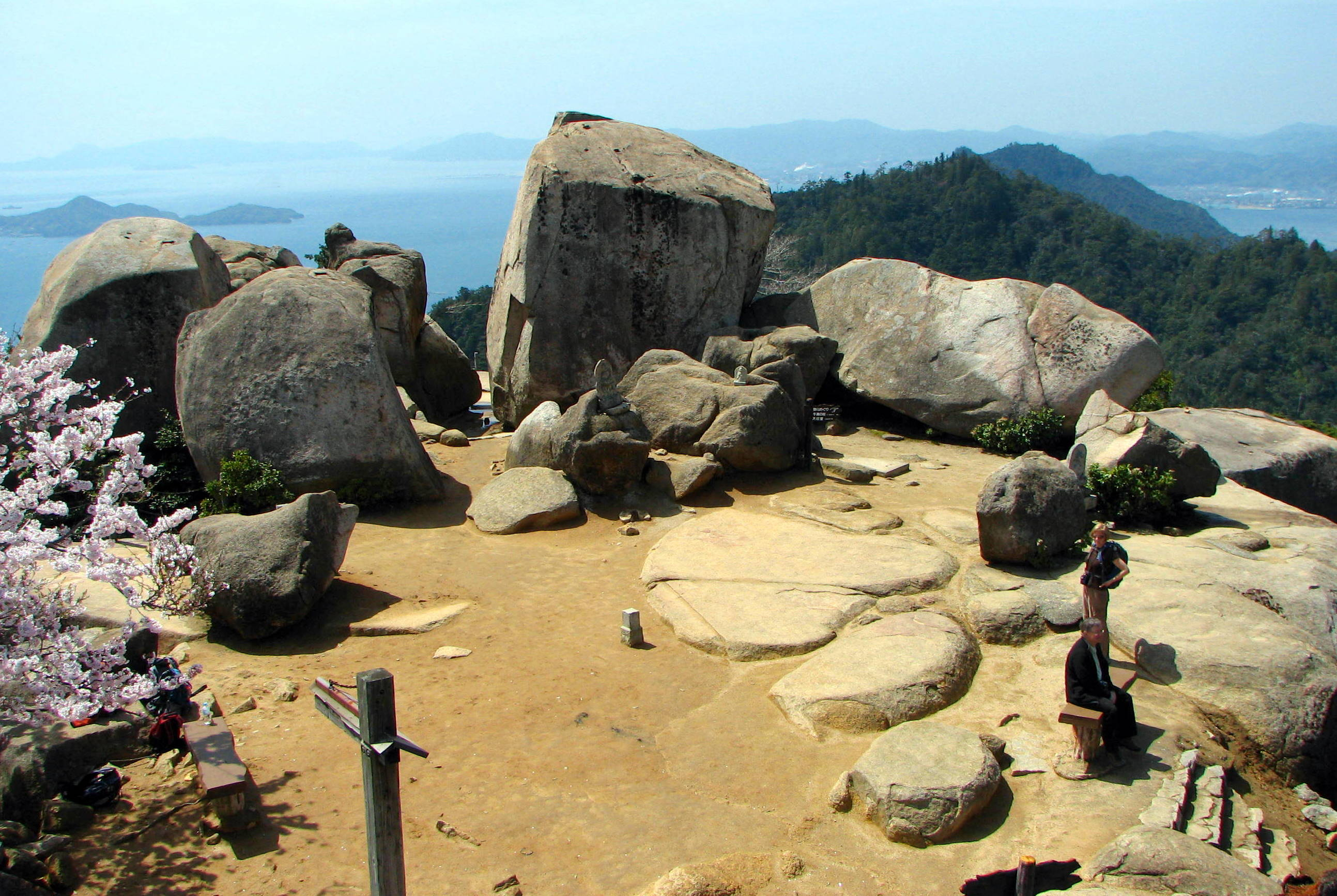
Mount Misen summit

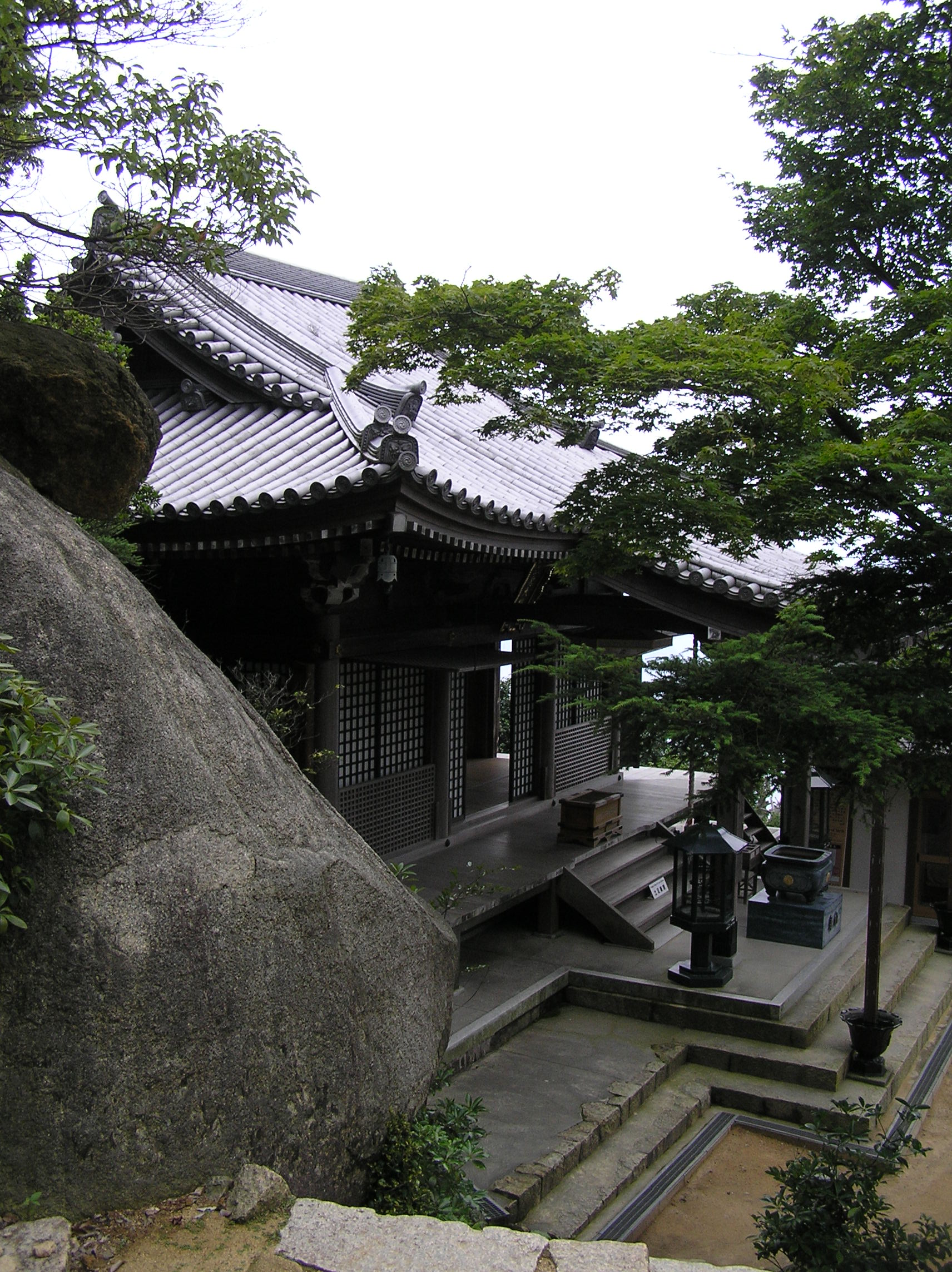
Sanki-gongen-dō temple near the summit of Mount Misen

Kiezu-no-hi (The eternal flame) This is the holy fire said to have been started by the Japanese Buddhist monk Kobo Daishi, who founded the Daishoin Temple in 806. It still burns today and the holy water boiled by this fire is used to treat diseases. This fire was used as the pilot light for the 'Flame of Peace' in Hiroshima Peace Memorial Park. Reikado Hall, which housed the flame, burned down in a 2026 fire.

Shakujo-no-ume (Plum tree of Tin Stick) The Plum tree of Tin Stick is said to be Kobo-Daishi's crosier, which took root where he was leaning on it and grew into a plum tree.

Mandara-iwa Behind Misenhondo Hall is a gigantic bedrock face on which handwritten letters, Sanskrit characters and illustrations of Kobo Daishi are engraved. It is currently closed to visitors.

Kanman-iwa (Ebb-and-flow rock) This rock sits about 500 meters above sea level, but somehow saltwater rises and subsides inside its hollow according to the ebb and flow of the tide.

Hyoshigi-no oto (Sound of wooden clappers) Here you can hear the 'clink, clink' sound of beating wooden clappers coming from nowhere in the middle of the night. Legend has it that the source of the noise is a tengu, a long-nosed goblin who lives inside in Mount Misen. People are warned to stay indoors when they hear the noise or risk being cursed.

Shigure-zakura (showered cherry blossom) This is a cherry tree that was always moist with dew, as if there has been a passing shower, even on a dry and sunny day. Unfortunately the tree has since been cut down and can't be seen.

Ryuoto No Sugi (Sea-fire Japan Cedar) This is a great cedar tree which could be seen as mysterious lights from the sea off the coast of Miyajima. It was said the lights were clearer on the eve of a lunar New Year. The cedar is now dead and only the stump remains.

== Mount Misen Primeval Forest ==
The Mount Misen Primeval Forest covers the north side of the mountain. Various conifer trees grow at elevations above 400 m, including fir and Japanese hemlock, in addition to evergreen broad-leaf trees such as Quercus salicina. Halfway to the foot of the mountain other species dominate, mainly Japanese red pine in addition to Lithocarpus glaber, Myrsine seguinii, and Symplocos glauca.

The forest is protected and designated a Natural Monument by the government of Japan. It is also a part of the main area of the UNESCO World Heritage Site of Itsukushima Shrine, while the rest of Mount Misen is inside the buffer zone.

== See also ==
- Miyajima Ropeway
