= Japanese ship Itsukushima =

Two ships of the Imperial Japanese Navy were named Itsukushima:

- Japanese cruiser Itsukushima, a Matsushima-class cruiser launched in 1889 and scrapped in 1926
- Japanese minelayer Itsukushima, a minelayer launched in 1929 and sunk in 1944
