= Itsukushima Shrine =

Shinto shrine in Hiroshima Prefecture, Japan

Itsukushima Shinto Shrine
UNESCO World Heritage Site
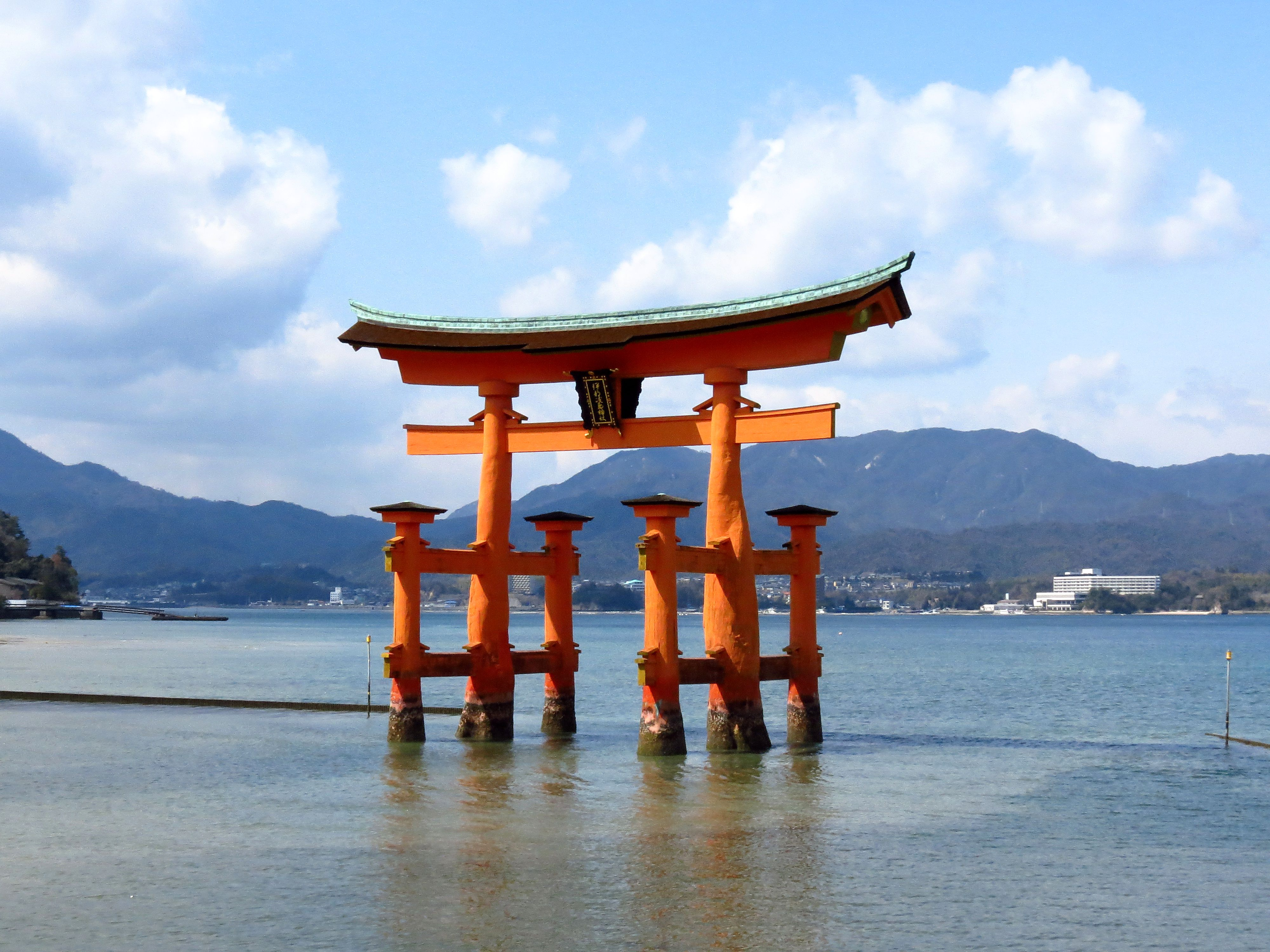
- The torii of Itsukushima Shrine, the site's most recognizable landmark, appears to float in the water.

- Location within Japan
- Location: Itsukushima, Japan
- Criteria: Cultural: i, ii, iv, vi
- Reference: 776
- Inscription: 1996 (20th Session)
- Area: 431.2 ha (1,066 acres)
- Buffer zone: 2,634.3 ha (6,509 acres)
- Website: en.itsukushimajinja.jp
- Coordinates: 34°17′45″N 132°19′11″E

Japanese name
- Hiragana: いつくしまじんじゃ
- Kyūjitai: 嚴島神社
- Shinjitai: 厳島神社
Transcriptions
- Revised Hepburn: Itsukushima-jinja

Itsukushima Shrine (厳島神社, Itsukushima-jinja) is a Shinto shrine on the island of Itsukushima (popularly known as Miyajima), best known for its "floating" torii. It is in the city of Hatsukaichi, in Hiroshima Prefecture in Japan, accessible from the mainland by ferry at Miyajimaguchi Station. The shrine complex is listed as a UNESCO World Heritage Site, and the Japanese government has designated several buildings and possessions as National Treasures.

The Itsukushima shrine is one of Japan's most popular tourist attractions. It is most famous for its dramatic gate, or torii, on the outskirts of the shrine, the sacred peaks of Mount Misen, extensive forests, and its ocean view. The shrine complex itself consists of two main buildings: the Honsha shrine and the Sessha Marodo-jinja, as well as 17 other different buildings and structures that help to distinguish it.

== History ==
=== Origin ===
Itsukushima jinja was the chief Shinto shrine (ichinomiya) of Aki Province.

This shrine is one of the "Three Great Shrines of Aki Province", along with Take Shrine and Hayatani Shrine.

The first torii on the site is said to have been erected in 569, supposedly by Saeki Kuramoto during the reign of Empress Suiko (592–628 CE). Although a torii has been in place at the site since 1168, the current structure dates to 1875. The present shrine has been popularly attributed to Taira no Kiyomori, a prominent noble of the Imperial Court and later Chancellor (Daijō-daijin), who contributed heavily to the construction of the shrine during his time as governor of Aki Province in 1168. Another renowned patron of the shrine was Mōri Motonari, lord of Chōshū Domain, who was responsible for rebuilding the honden in 1571. As a result of waging war against Sue Takafusa there in 1555, Motonari is said to have tainted the island's grounds by battling on the island. Spilling blood violated the strict taboos meant to preserve the sacred purity associated with Shinto shrines. The only surviving structure in Itsukushima shrine from the Kamakura period is the Kyakuden or "Guest-God's Shrine".

=== Kiyomori ===
It was not uncommon during the 12th century for the nobility to build shrines or take on other architectural projects in order to "reflect their power and splendor". The Taira clan are known specifically for their involvement in maritime trade with the Song dynasty (960–1279) and for attempting to monopolize overseas trade along the Inland Sea.

Kiyomori was at the height of his power when he established the Taira dominion over the island. He "ordered construction of the main hall of Itsukushima shrine as a display of reverence for the tutelary god of navigation and to serve as a base for maritime activities". Miyajima soon became the Taira family shrine. Supposedly, Kiyomori chose the location also for the reason to further establish himself in the Heian aristocracy as one who deviated from the social norms of Shinto pilgrimage. He lavished great wealth upon Itsukushima, and he enjoyed showing the place to his friends and colleagues, or even to royal personages".

It is also said that Kiyomori rebuilt the shrine on account of a dream he had of an old monk who promised him dominion over Japan if he constructed a shrine on the island of Miyajima and paid homage to its kami who are enshrined there for his success in life. The renovations funded by the Taira allowed for Itsukushima to "grow into an important religious complex".

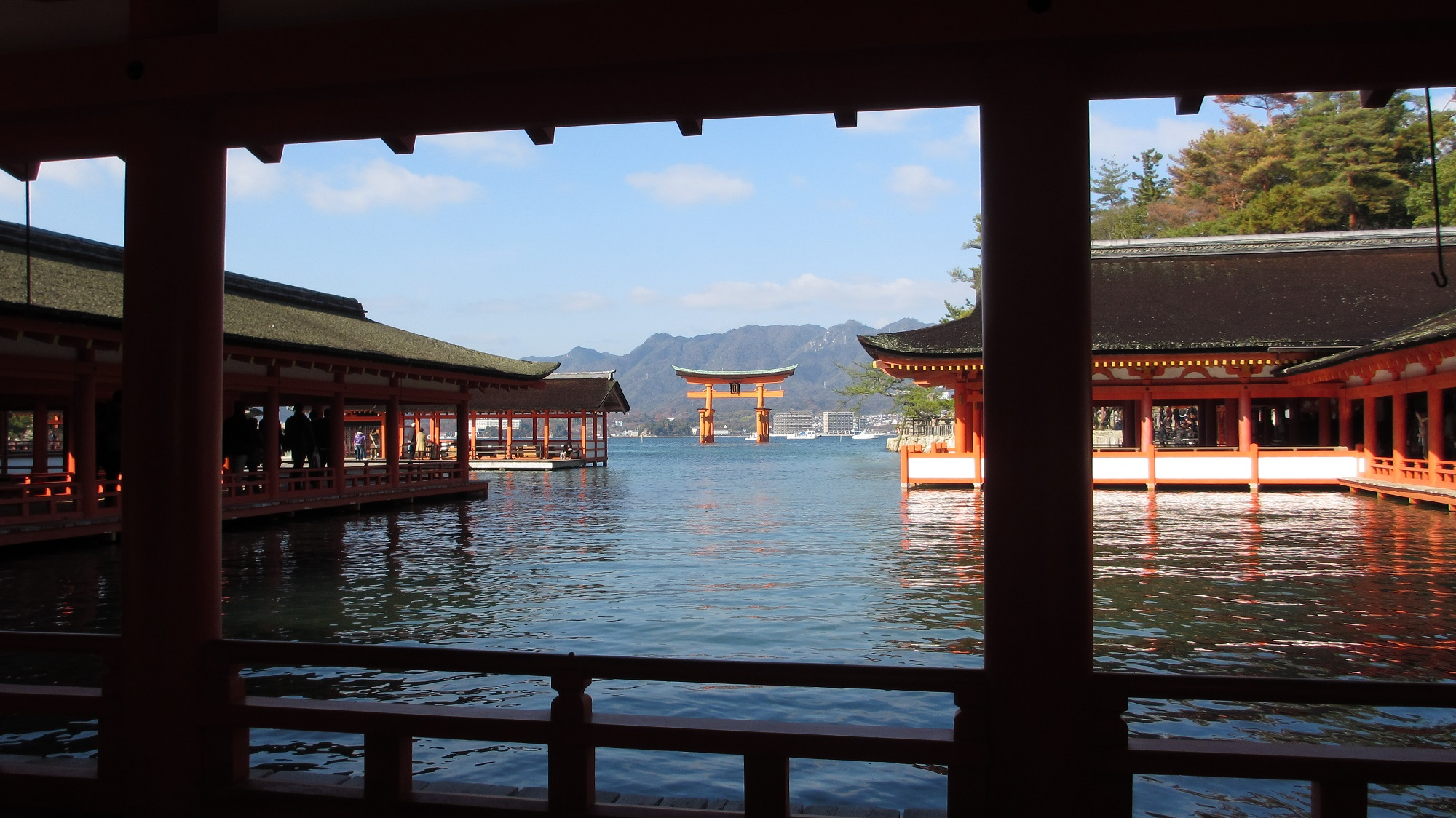
The Itsukushima Shrine at high tide, when it appears to float on the water

== Religious significance ==
The Itsukushima shrine is dedicated to the three daughters of Susano-o no Mikoto: Ichikishimahime no mikoto, Tagorihime no mikoto, and Tagitsuhime no mikoto. Otherwise known as the sanjoshin or "three female deities", these Shinto deities are the goddesses of seas and storms. Kiyomori believed the goddesses to be "manifestations of Kannon", therefore the island was understood as the home of the bodhisattva. In Japanese, the word Itsukushima translates to "island dedicated to the gods". The island itself is also considered to be a god, which is why the shrine was built on the outskirts of the island. Adding to its sanctity, Mount Misen is the tallest peak at about 535 metres (1,755 ft). Tourists can either hike or take a ropeway to the top.

Its treasures include the celebrated Heike Nōkyō, or "Sutras dedicated by the House of Taira". These consist of thirty-two scrolls, on which the Lotus, Amida, and Heart sutras have been copied by Kiyomori, his sons, and other members of the family, each completing the transcription of one scroll, and it was "decorated with silver, gold, and mother-of-pearl by himself [Kiyomori] and other members of his clan".

Originally Itsukushima was a pure Shinto shrine "where no births or deaths were allowed to cause pollution". Because the island itself has been considered sacred, commoners were not allowed to set foot on it throughout much of its history to maintain its purity. Retaining the purity of the shrine is so important that since 1878, no deaths or births have been permitted near it. To this day, pregnant women are supposed to retreat to the mainland as the day of delivery approaches, as are the terminally ill or the very elderly whose passing has become imminent. Burials on the island are forbidden. To allow pilgrims to approach, the shrine was built like a pier over the water, so that it appeared to float, separate from the land. The red entrance gate, or torii, was built over the water for much the same reason. Commoners had to steer their boats through the torii before approaching the shrine.

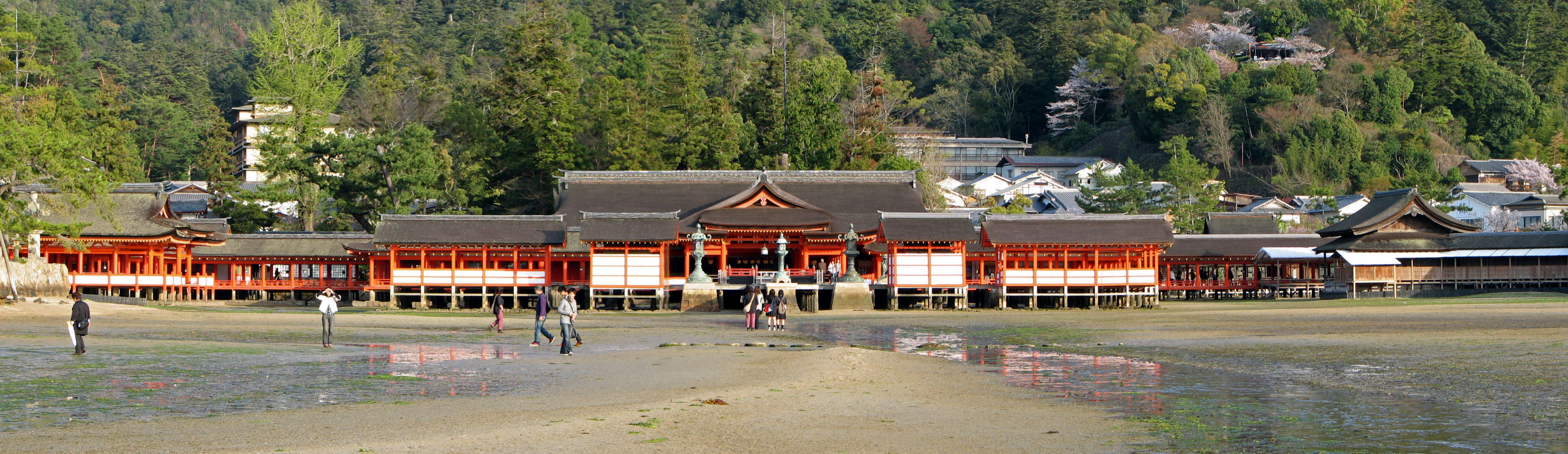
View from the torii at low tide

== Architecture ==
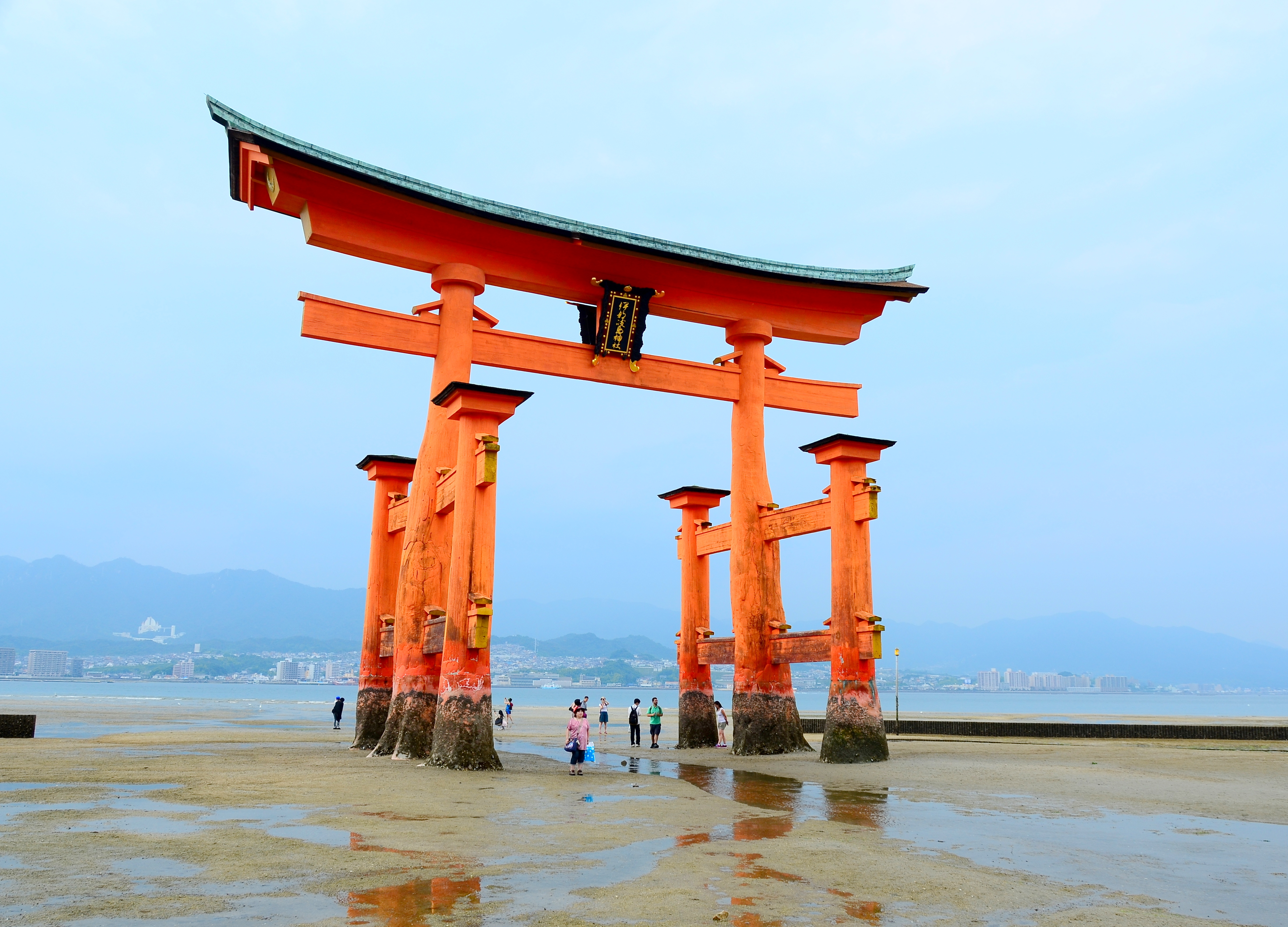
The torii, accessible from the island during low tide

Japan has gone to great lengths to preserve the twelfth-century-style architecture of the Shrine throughout history. The shrine was designed and built according to the Shinden-zukuri style, equipped with pier-like structures over the Matsushima bay in order to create the illusion of floating on the water, separate from the island, which could be approached by the devout "like a palace on the sea". This idea of intertwining architecture and nature is reflective of a popular trend during the 16th century as well as the Heian period in which Japanese structures tended to "follow after their environment", often allowing trees, water, and other forms of natural beauty to enter into the decor of homes and buildings. That led to a far more intimate relationship between the two.

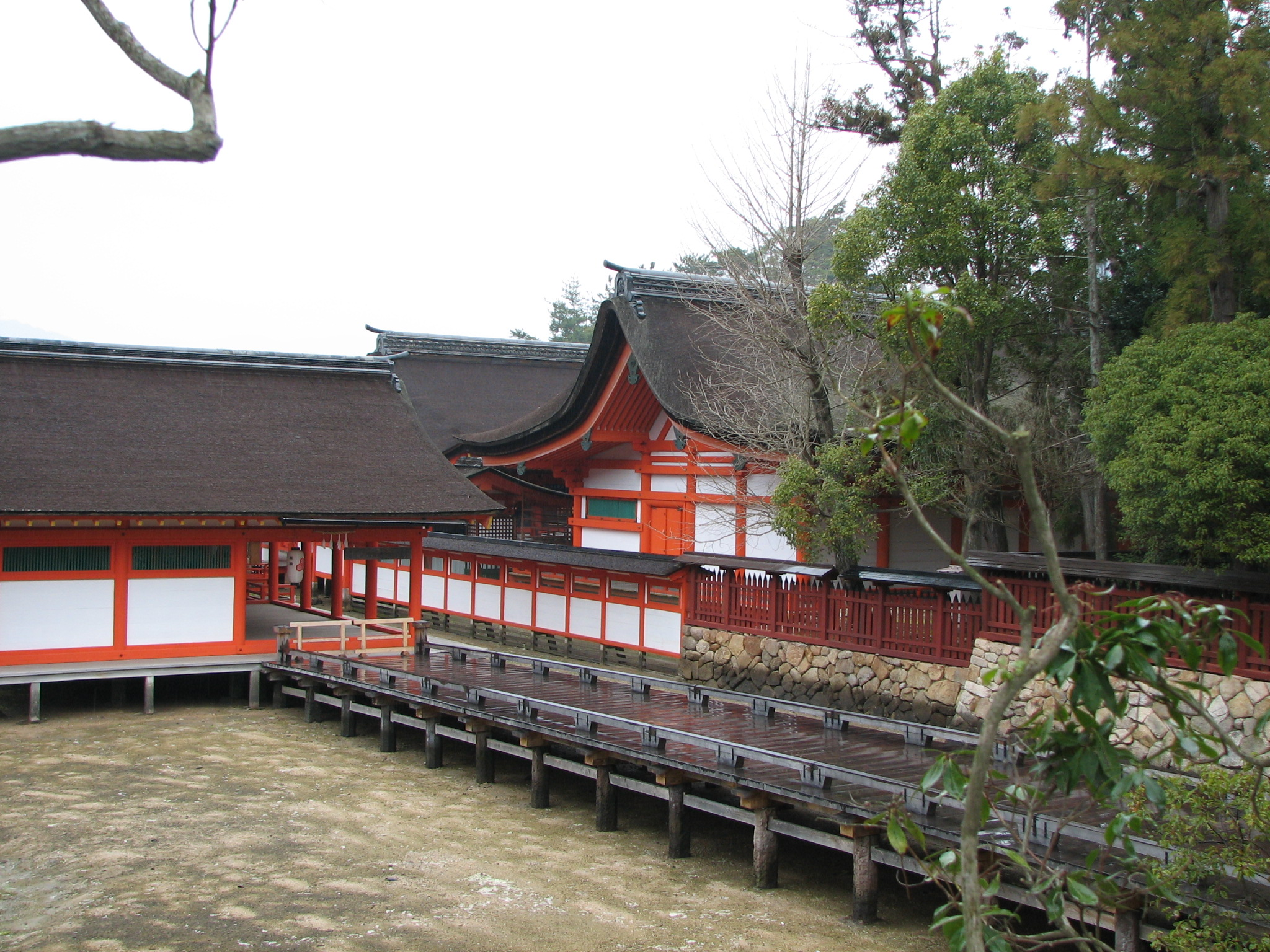
Itsukushima honden

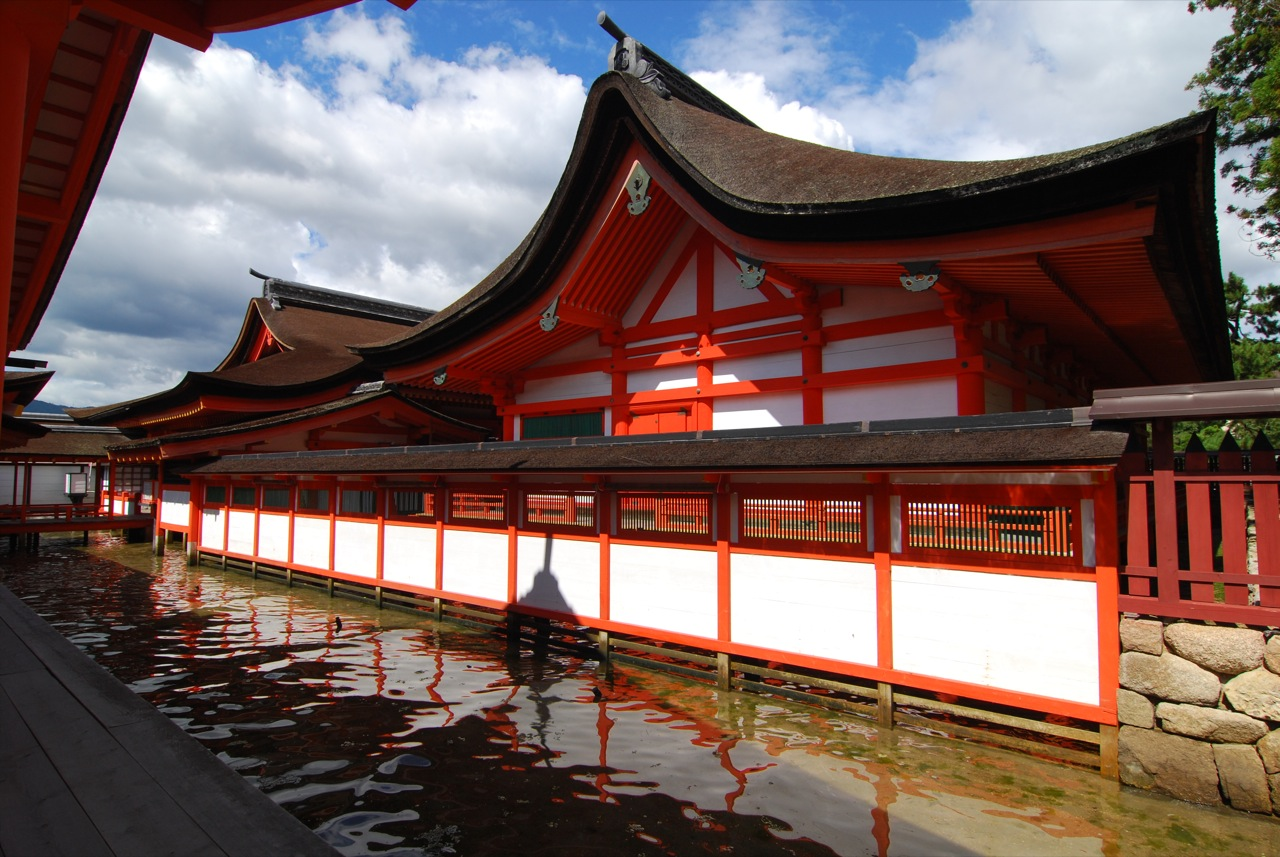
Itsukushima haiden

The most recognizable and celebrated feature of the Itsukushima shrine, is its 50-foot-tall (15 m) vermilion otorii gate ("great gate"), built of decay-resistant camphor wood. The placement of an additional leg in front of and behind each main pillar identifies the torii as reflecting the style of Ryōbu Shintō (dual Shinto), a medieval school of esoteric Japanese Buddhism associated with the Shingon Sect. The torii appears to be floating only at high tide. When the tide is low, it is approachable by foot from the island. Gathering shellfish near the gate is popular at low tide. At night, powerful lights on the shore illuminate the structure. The current torii dates to 1875, although there has been one on that site since 1168.

Shinto architecture has many distinct parts, most of which include the shrine's honden (main hall) and the unusually long haiden (main oratory), and its equally long heiden (offertory hall). The honden "is an eight-by-four bay structure with a kirizuma roof surfaced in cypress bark". Its walls are decorated in white stucco, and were constructed using a process requiring fifteen coats of white stucco, with vermilion woodwork.

Extending from the sides of the haraiden of the main shrine is a noh stage which dates from 1590. Noh theater performances have long been used to pay homage to the gods through the ritual acting out of key events in Shinto myth.

On September 5, 2004, the shrine was severely damaged by Typhoon Songda. The boardwalks and roof were partially destroyed, and the shrine was temporarily closed for repairs. Today anyone can visit the shrine at a cost of 300 yen.

== Kangen-sai ritual ==
The Kangen-sai at Itsukushima Jinja (Itsukushima Shrine) in Japan is the most extensive and elaborate Shinto ritual held at the shrine, originating from the Heian period (794–1185). It takes place annually on June 17 according to the lunar calendar, usually falling between late July and early August. The festival was initiated by the Heike warlord Taira no Kiyomori in the 12th century to pacify the deities of the shrine and is one of Japan's three largest boat rituals.

The main feature of Kangen-sai is a boat procession where a portable shrine carrying the deities is transported on a "goza-bune" boat—a large vessel formed by binding three traditional boats together. The deities are accompanied by musicians playing kangen court music, a refined and elegant form of ancient Japanese court music with stringed instruments, drums, and flutes. The festival reenacts an aristocratic entertainment spectacle with music played on boats, transformed into a Shinto ritual on the sacred island of Miyajima.

The ritual begins in the late afternoon with ceremonies at Itsukushima Shrine. As dusk falls, the boats carry the deities and musicians through the waters in front of the shrine, making multiple circuits while playing ceremonial court music. A highlight is the dramatic boat spinning in the narrow corridor near the shrine, timed with the music. Afterward, the boats visit the opposite shore at Jigozen Shrine for further rituals before returning to Itsukushima Shrine by nightfall.

Kangen-sai combines religious devotion with historical courtly culture, reflecting the shrine's significance and its protection by Taira no Kiyomori. It has continued for over a thousand years and remains a major festival showcasing traditional music, boat processionals, and Shinto faith on Miyajima Island, a UNESCO World Heritage Site.

== Kangen-sai gallery ==
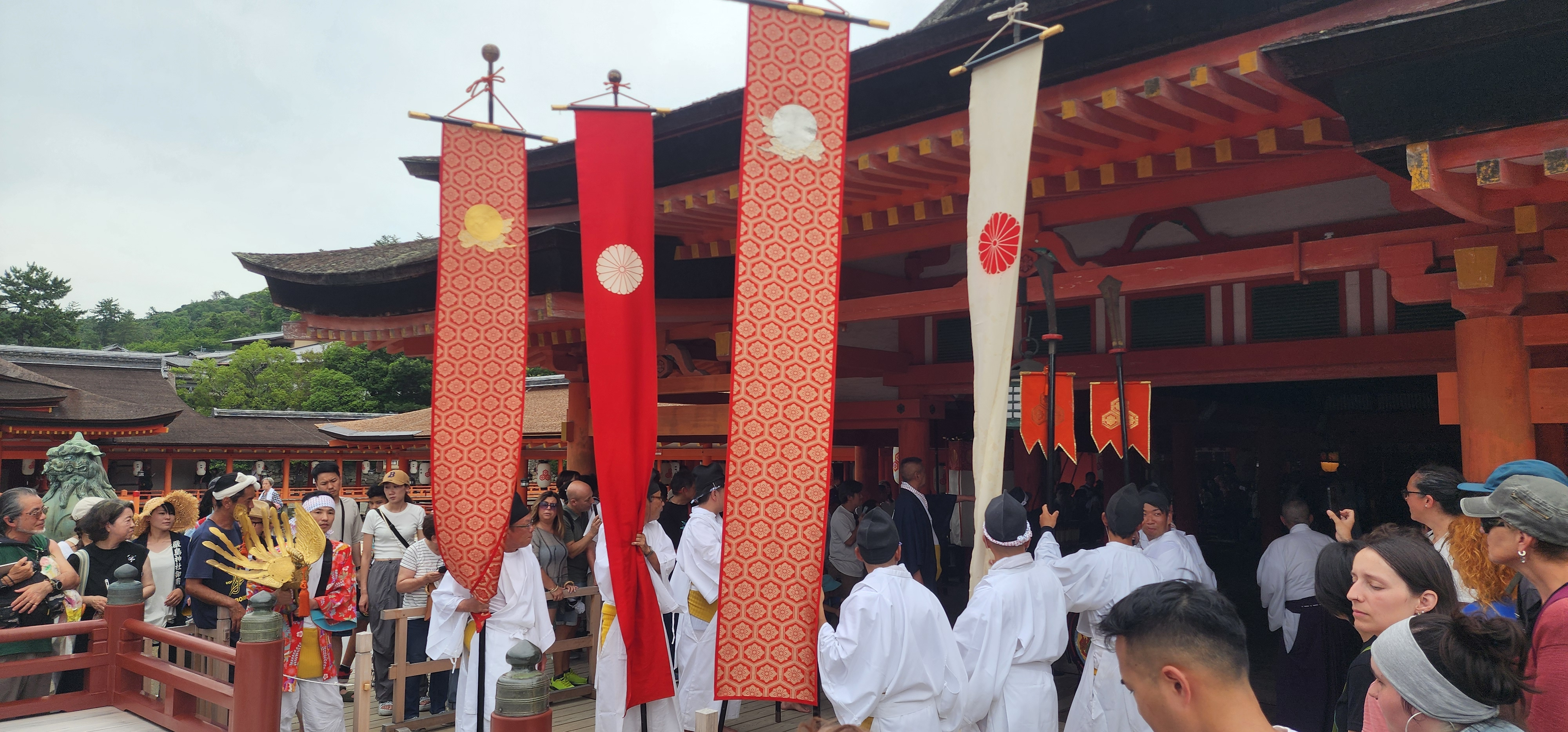
Kangen-sai ritual, Itsukushima jinja, Japan, July 11, 2025

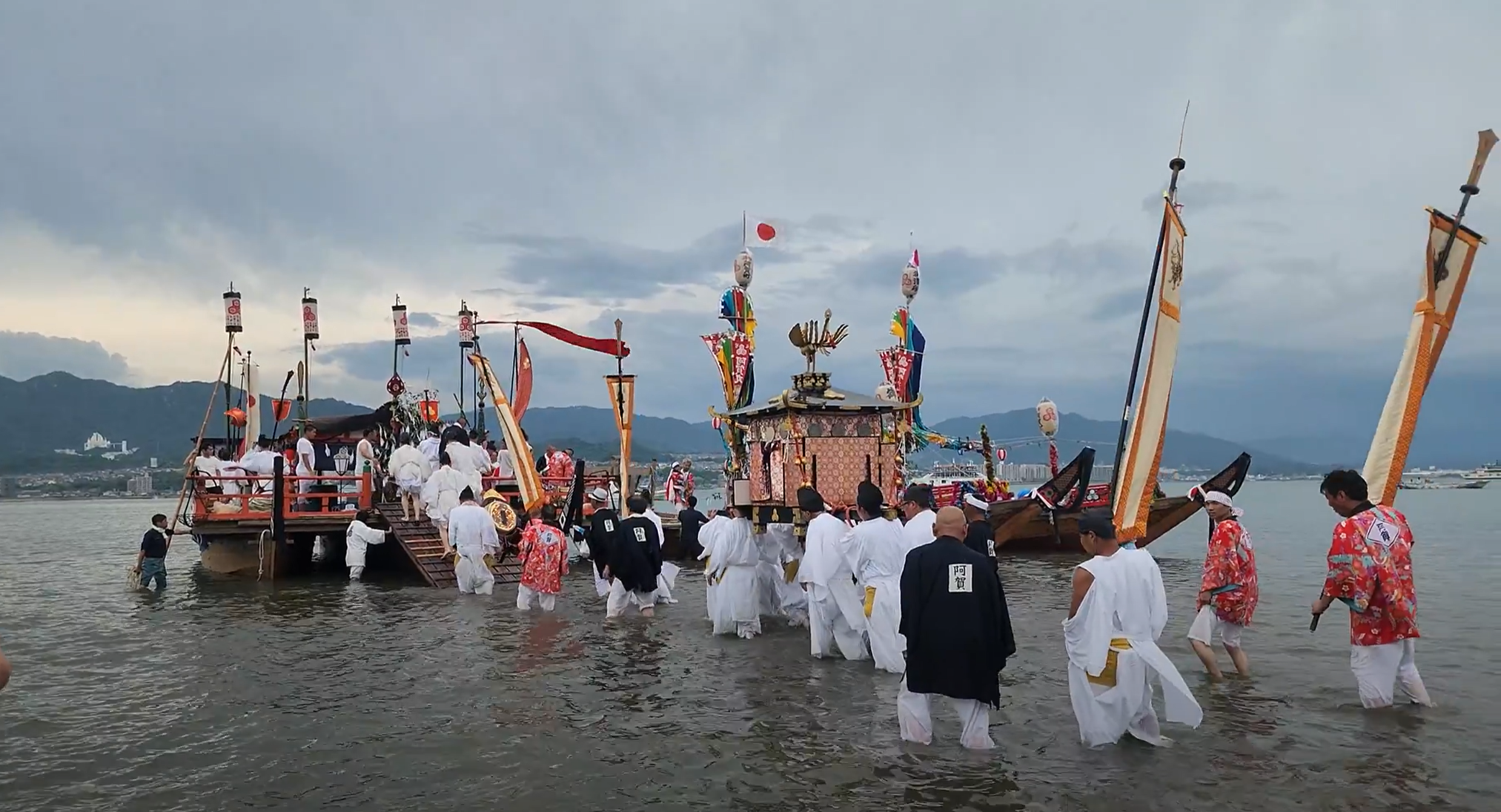
Kangen-sai ritual, Itsukushima jinja, Japan, July 11, 2025

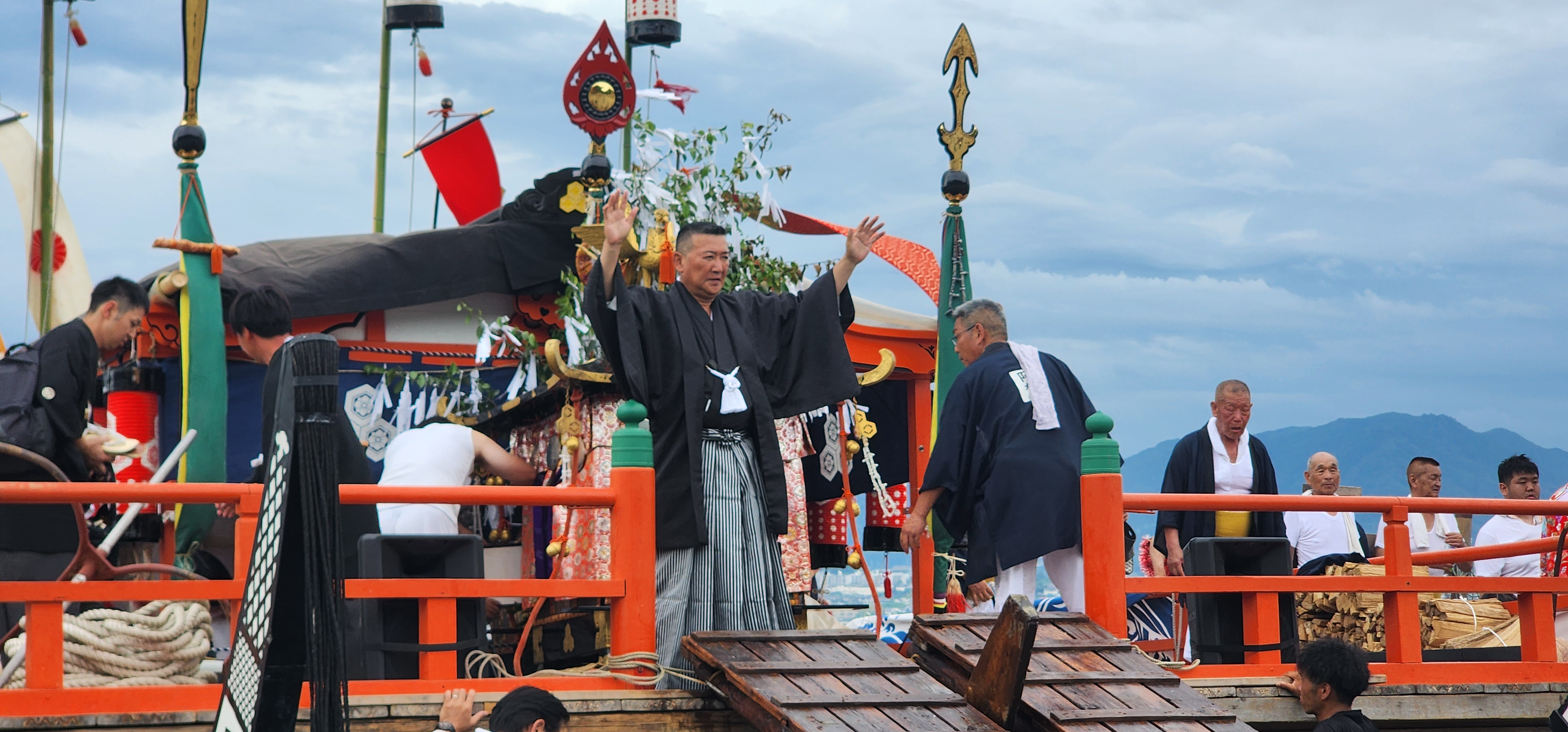
Kangen-sai ritual, Itsukushima jinja, Japan, July 11, 2025

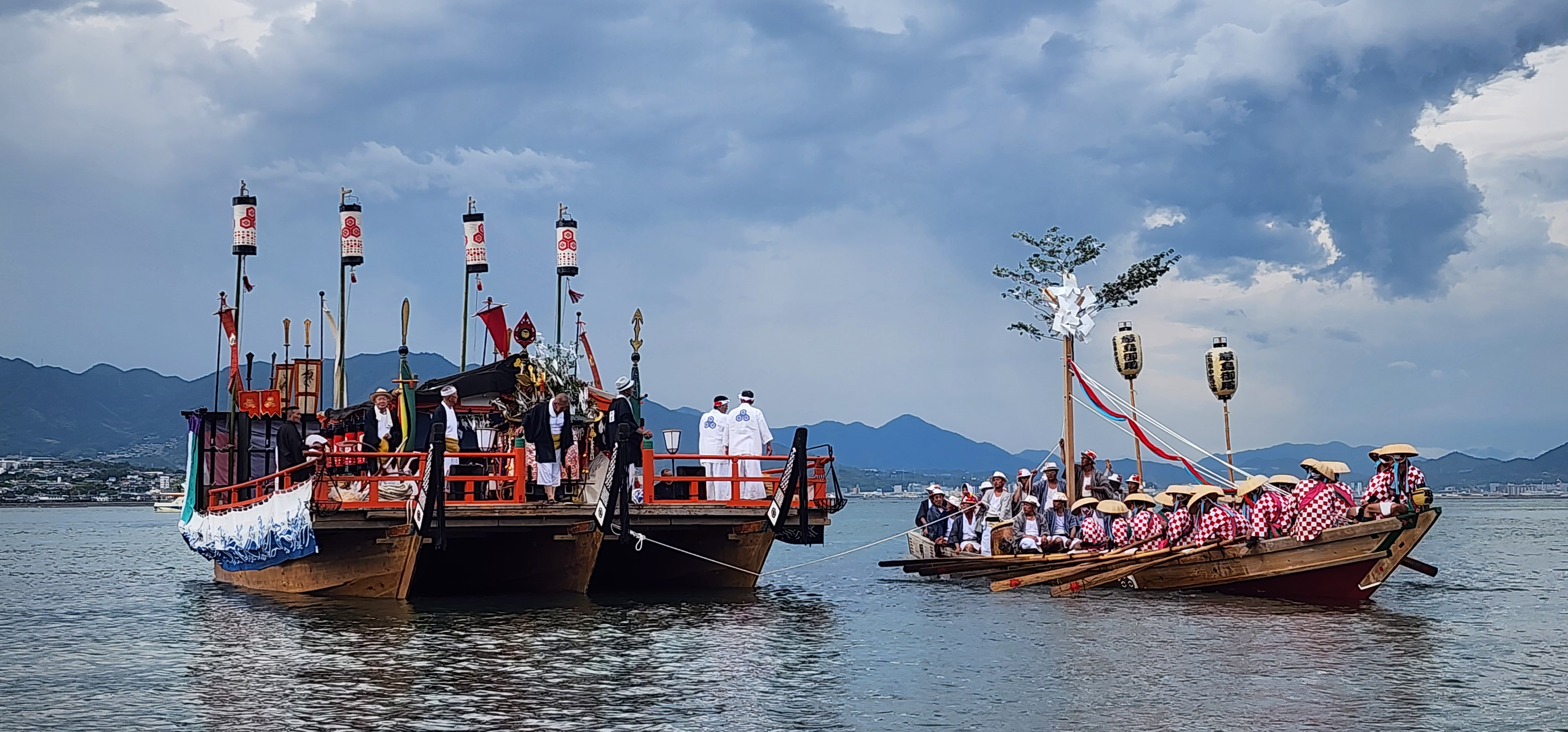
Kangen-sai ritual, Itsukushima jinja, Japan, July 11, 2025

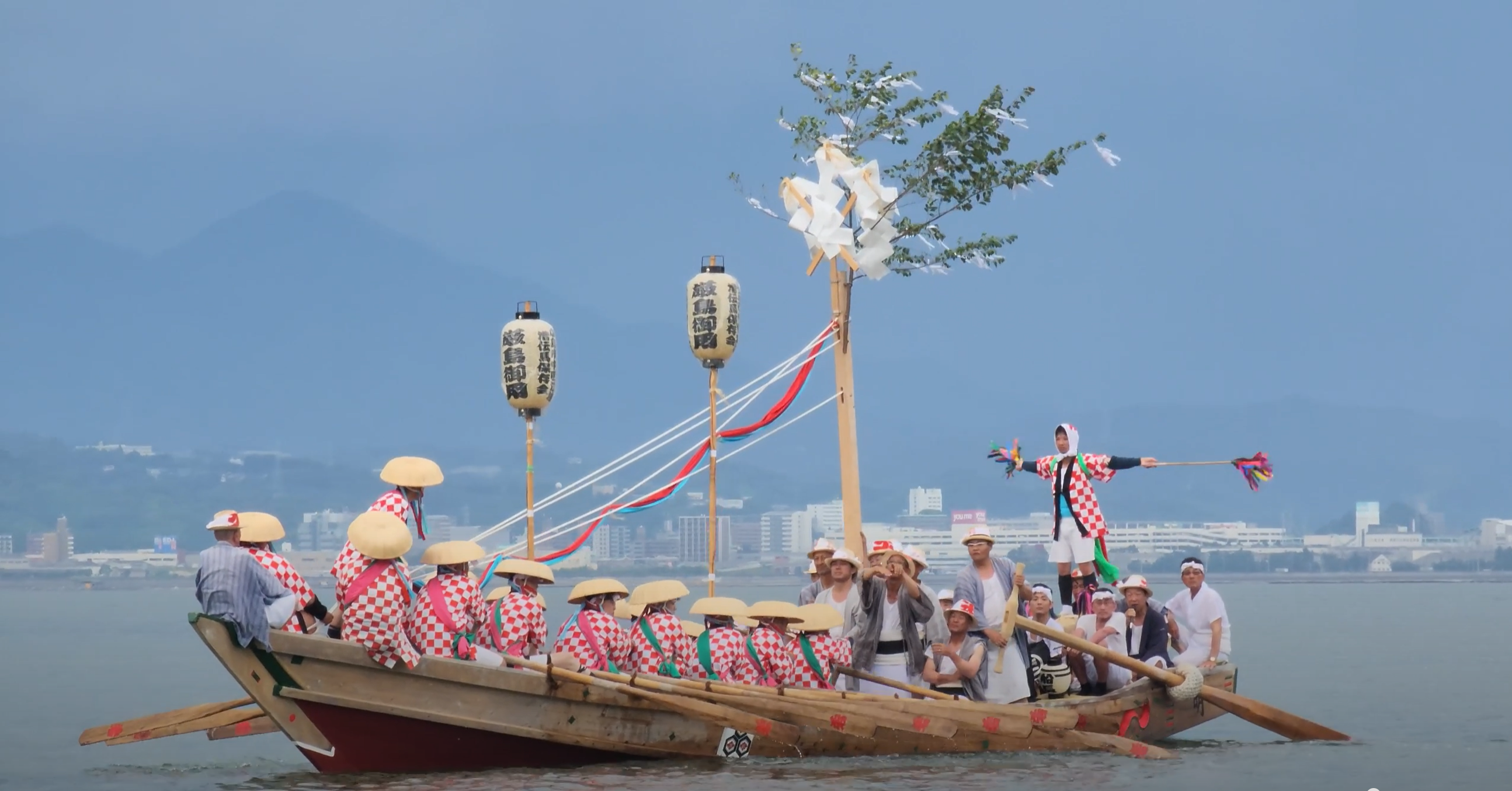
Kangen-sai ritual, Itsukushima jinja, Japan, July 11, 2025

== Gallery ==
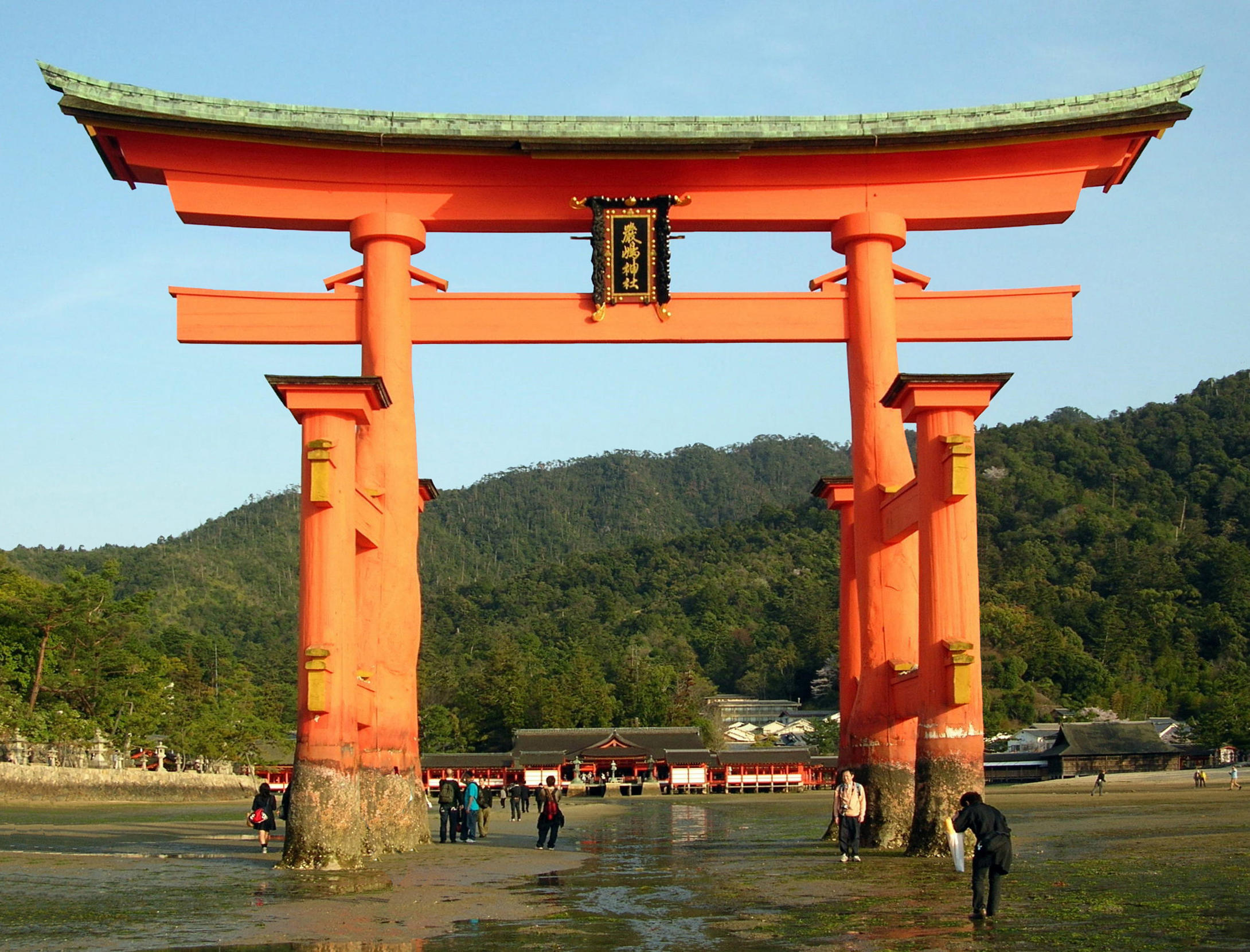
The torii at low tide

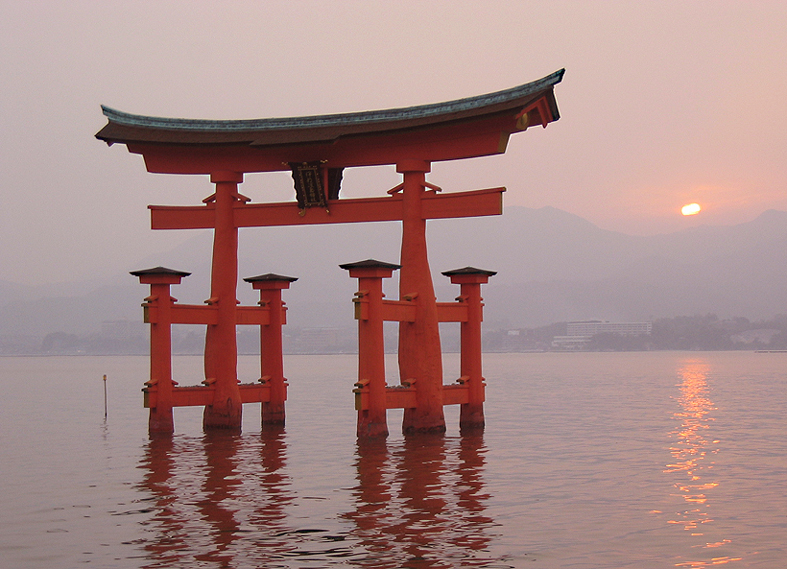
The torii at sunset

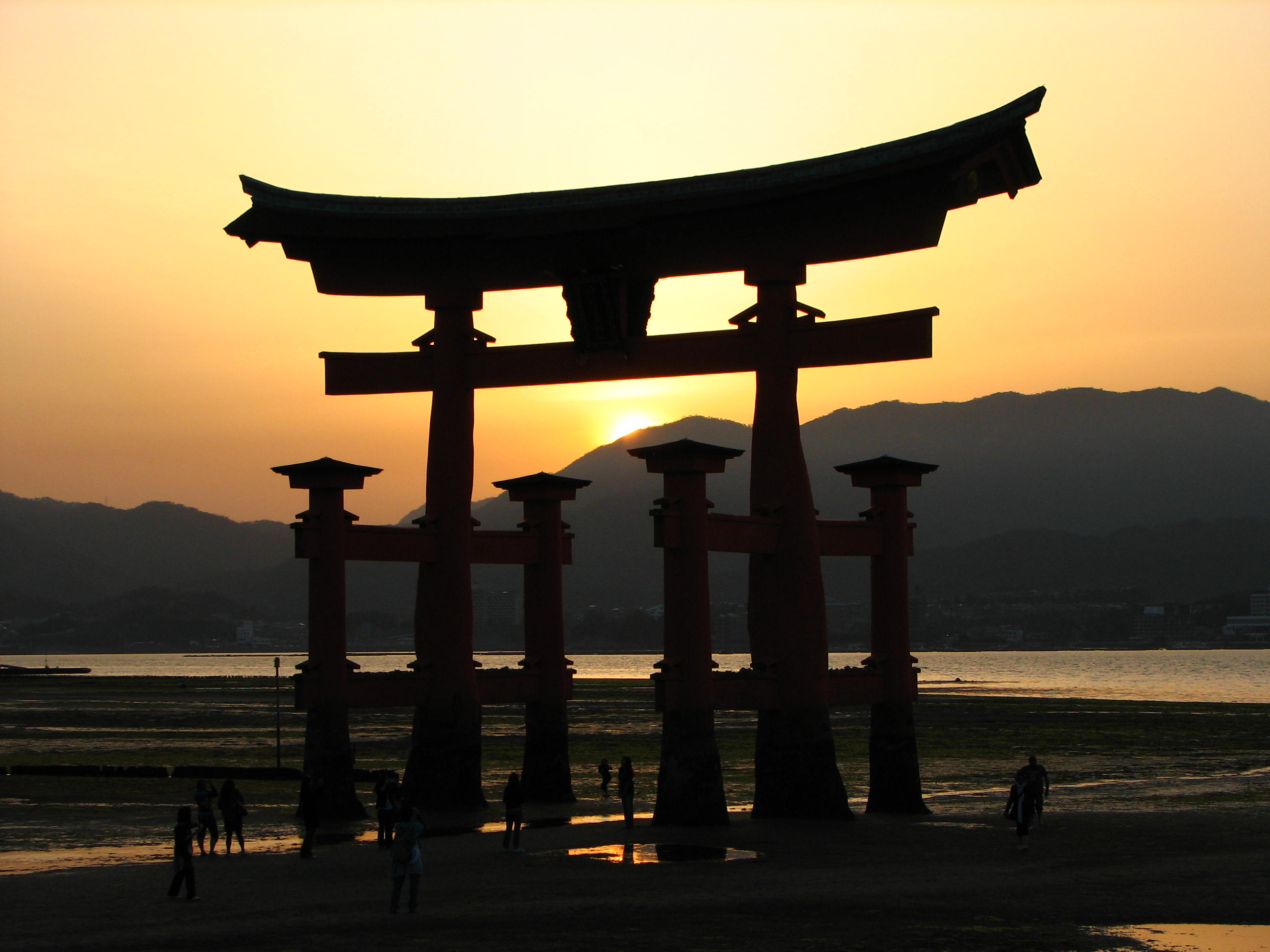
The torii at sunset

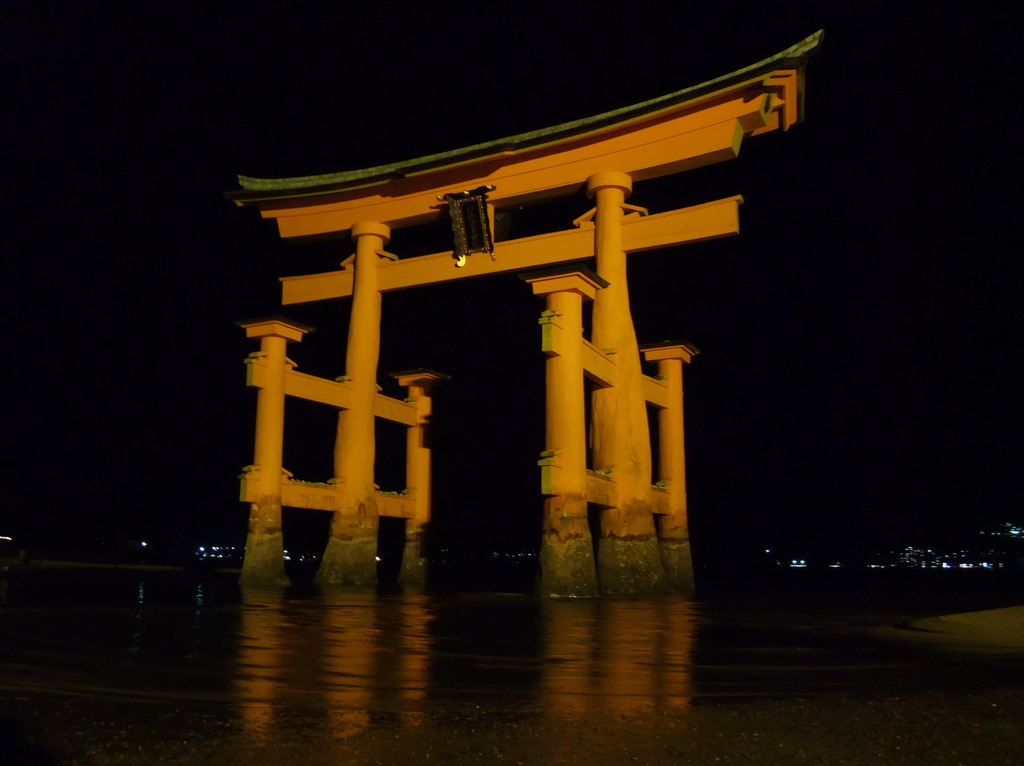
The torii at night

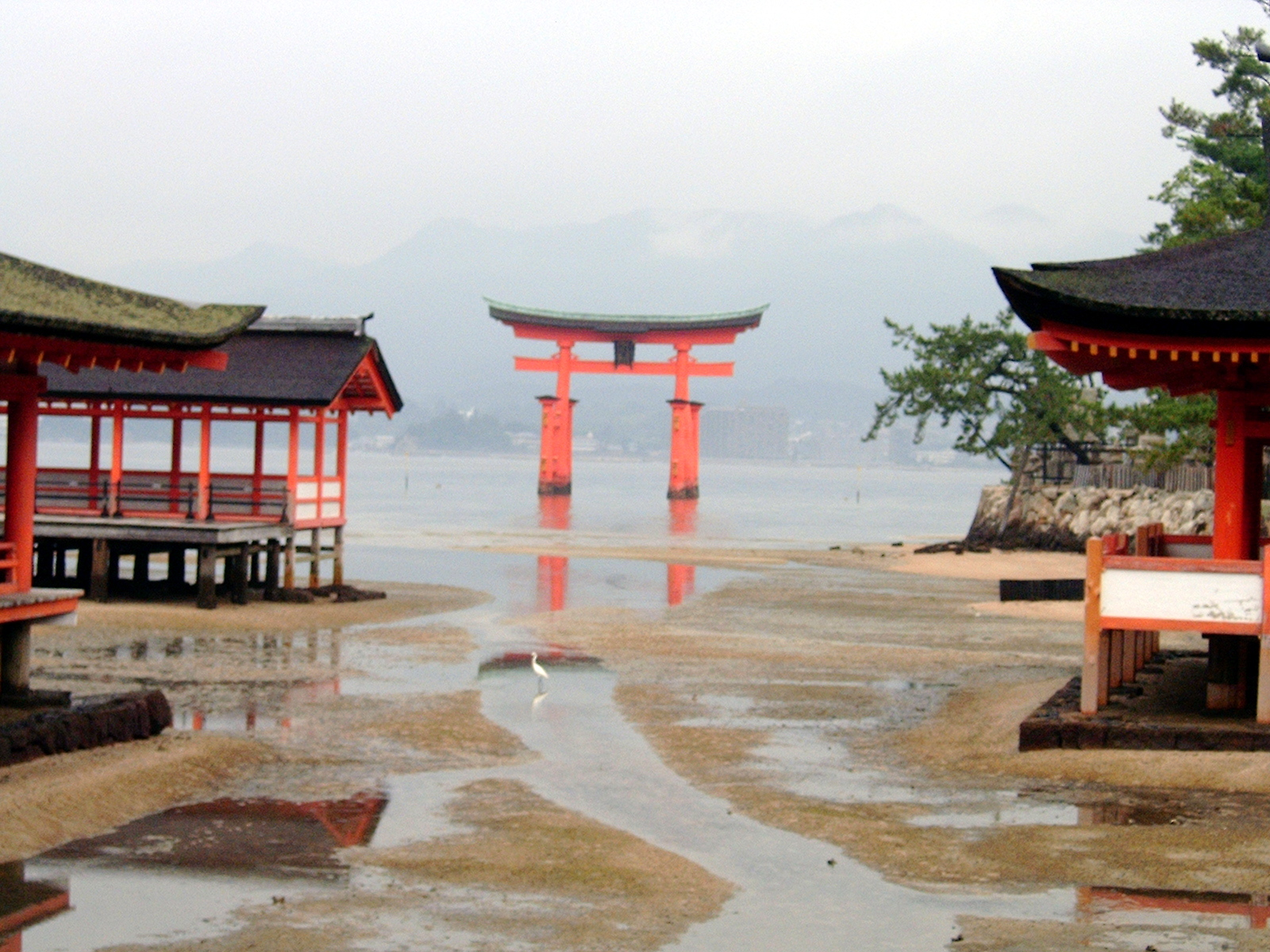
The torii at low tide, from the inside of the shrine

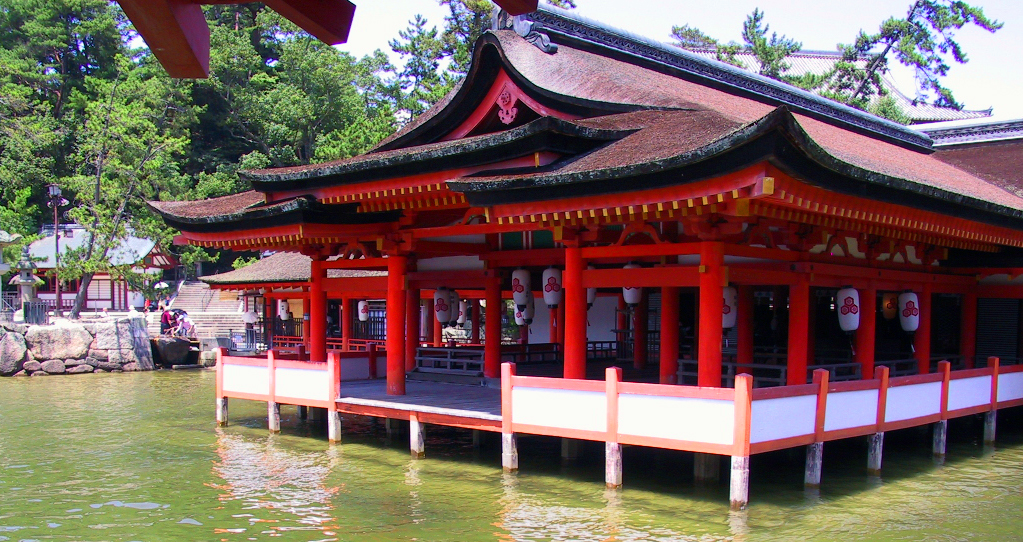
The buildings that make up the shrine itself are also built in the water.

Barrels of sake in one of the shrine's "floating" buildings

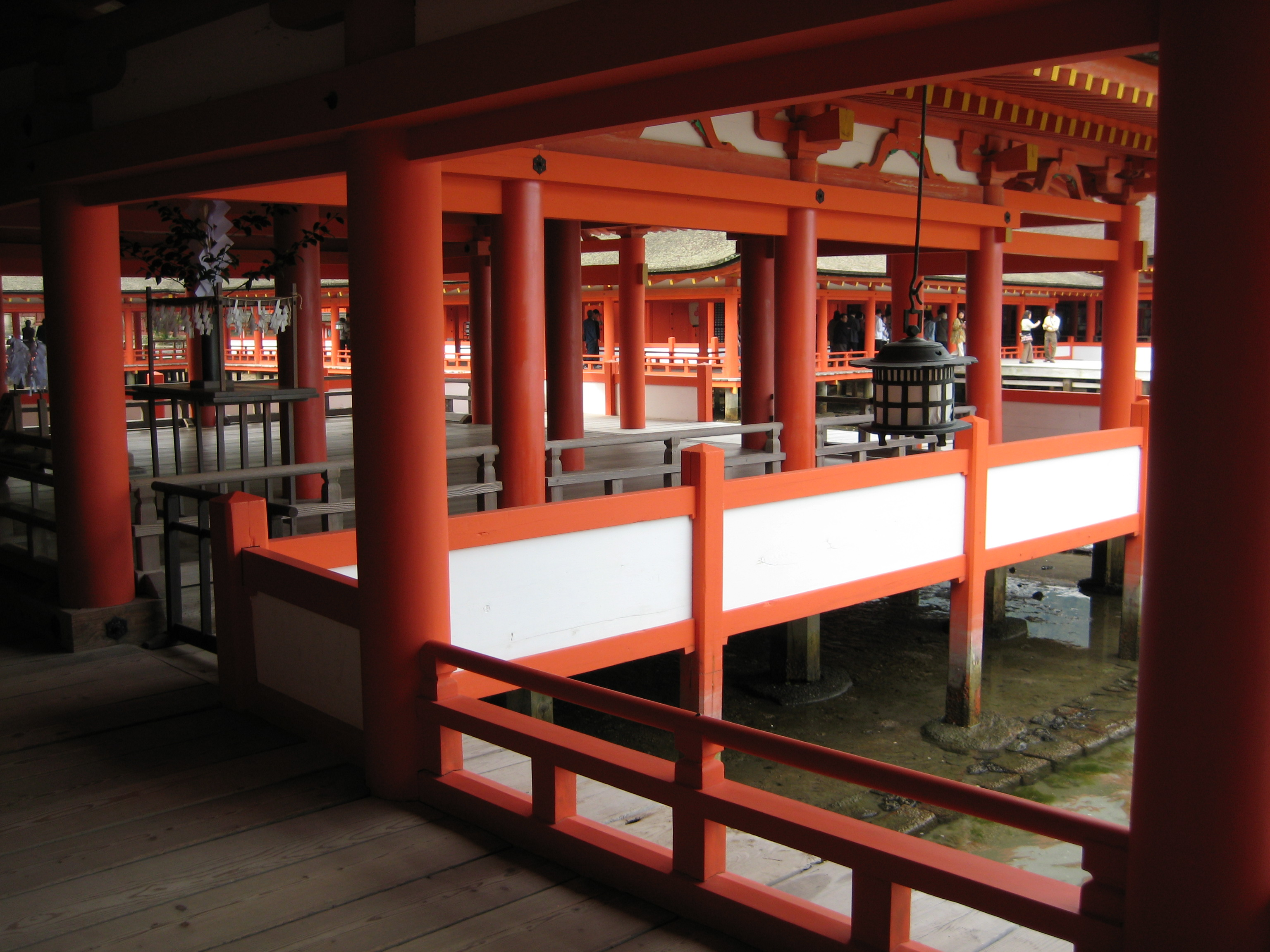
The shrine's halls and pathways on stilts

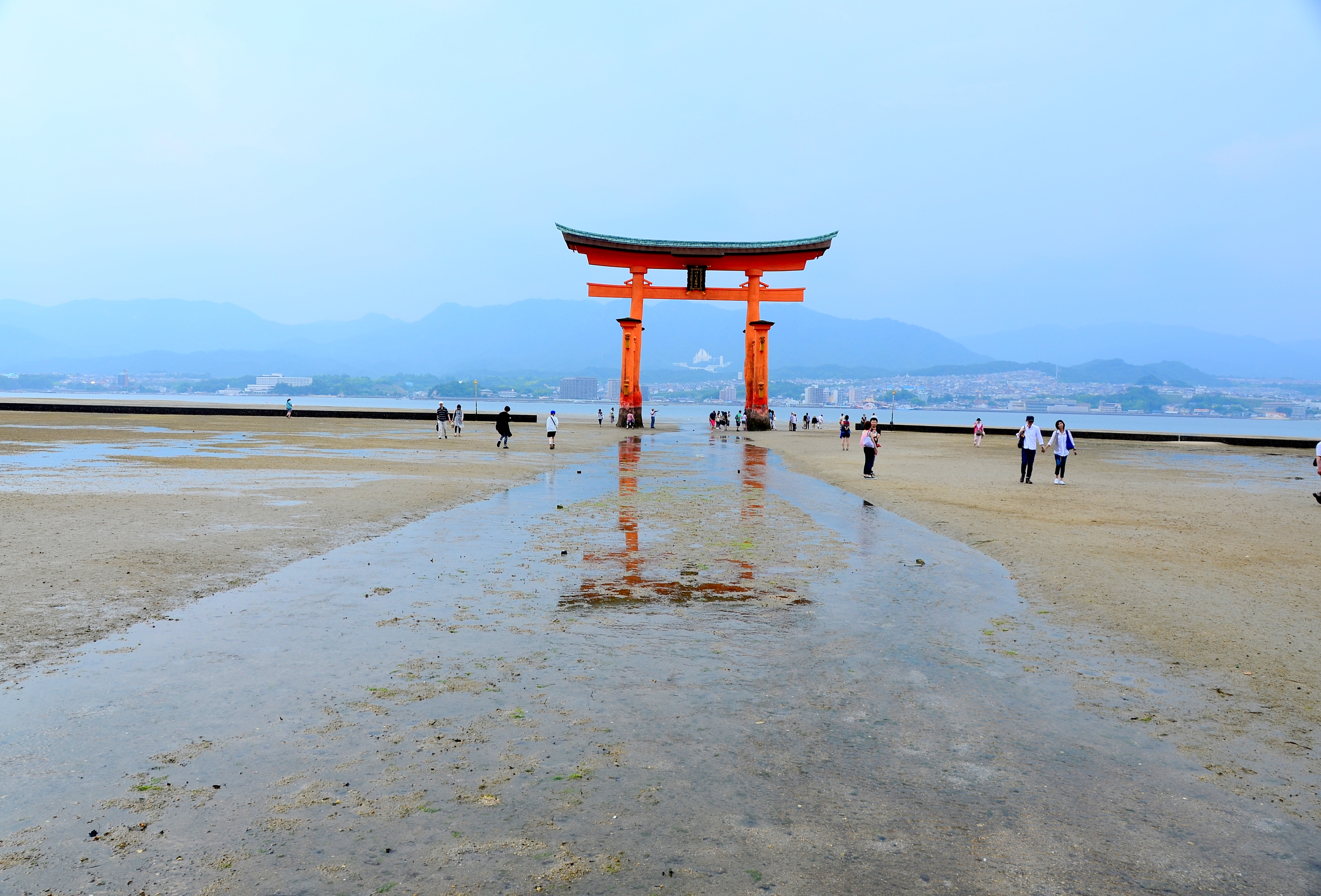
The torii gate as seen from the castle at low tide

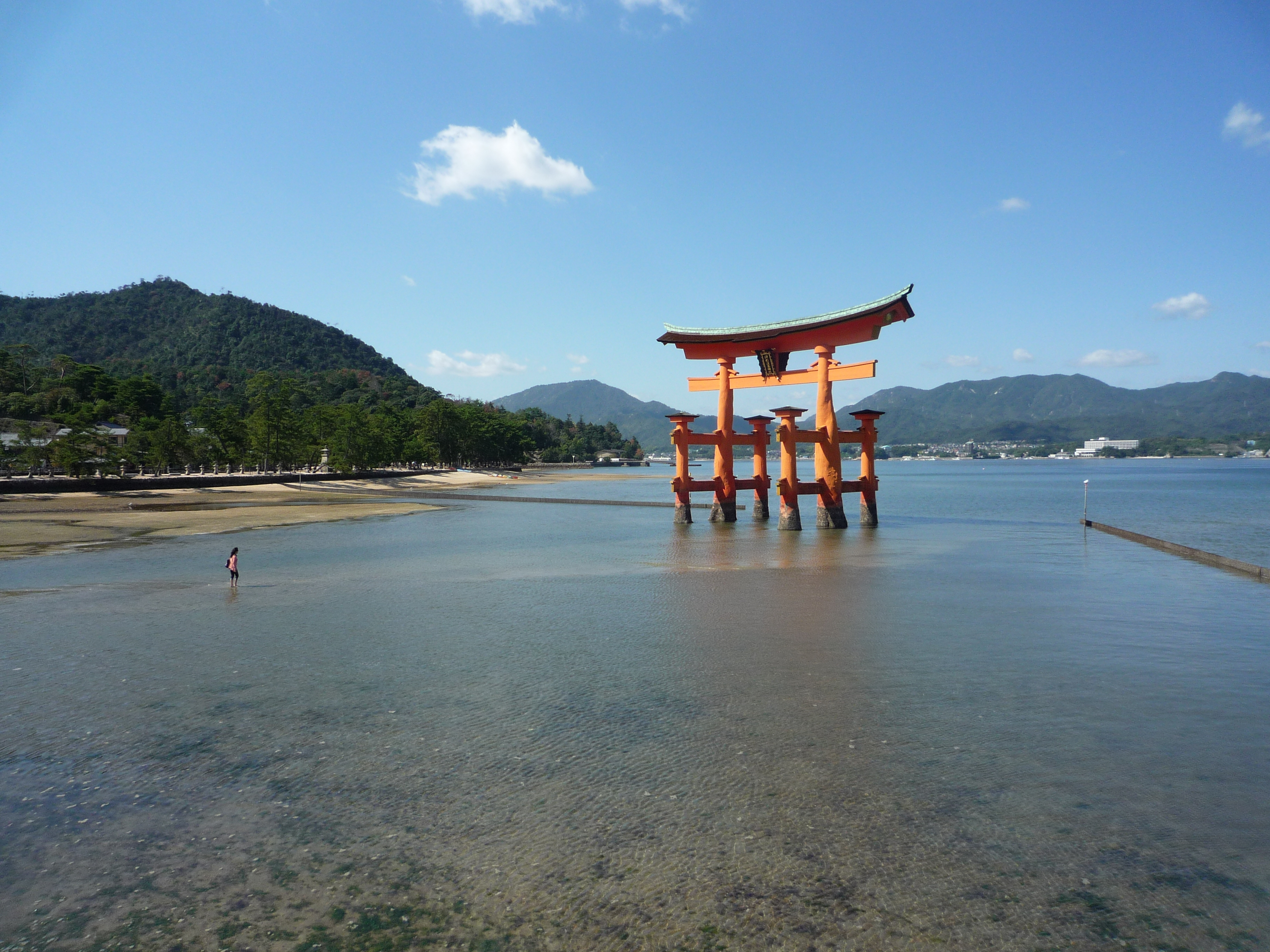
The torii with a visitor and view of the Seto Inland Sea

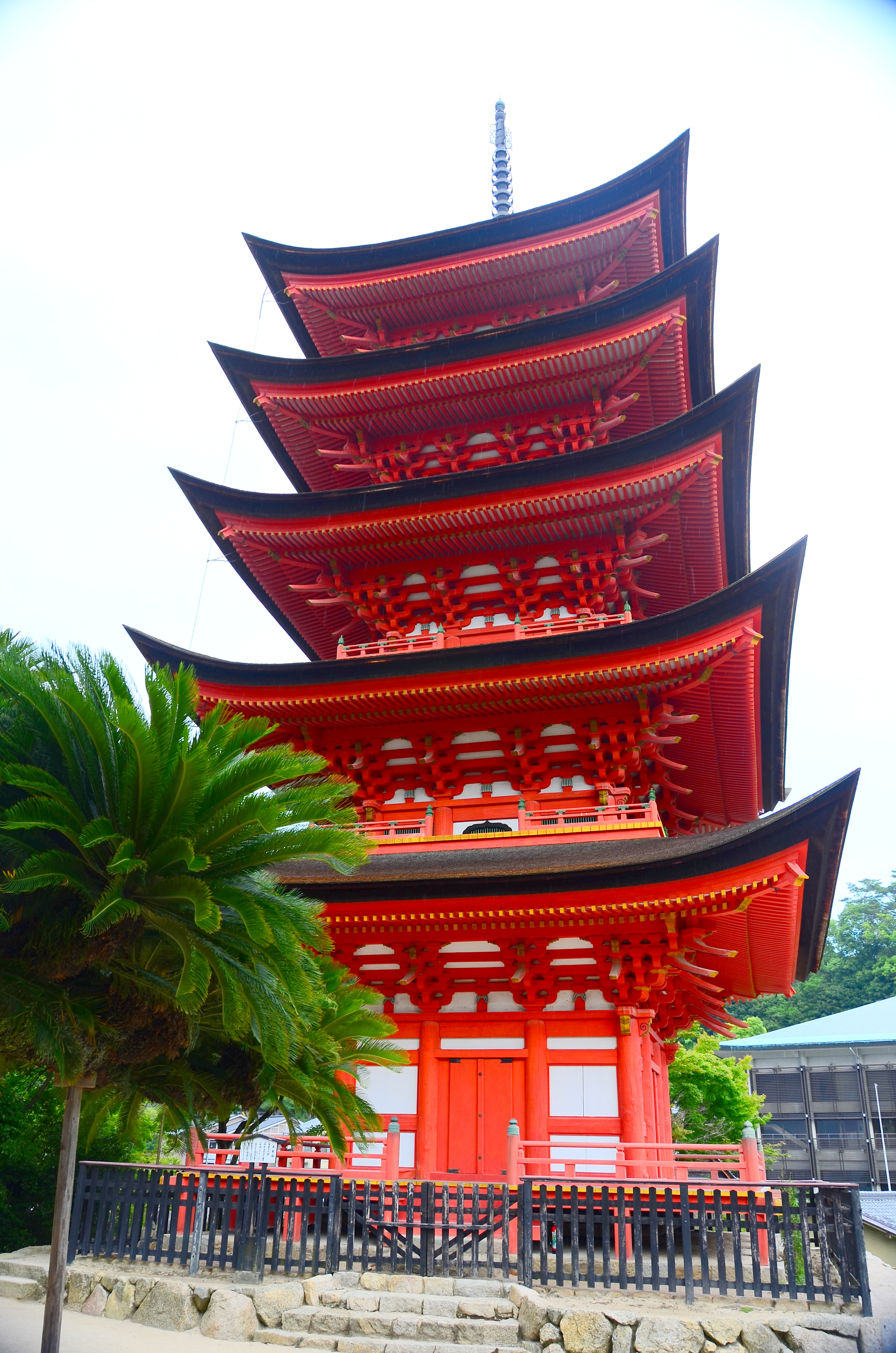
Five-Tiered Pagoda at Itsukushima

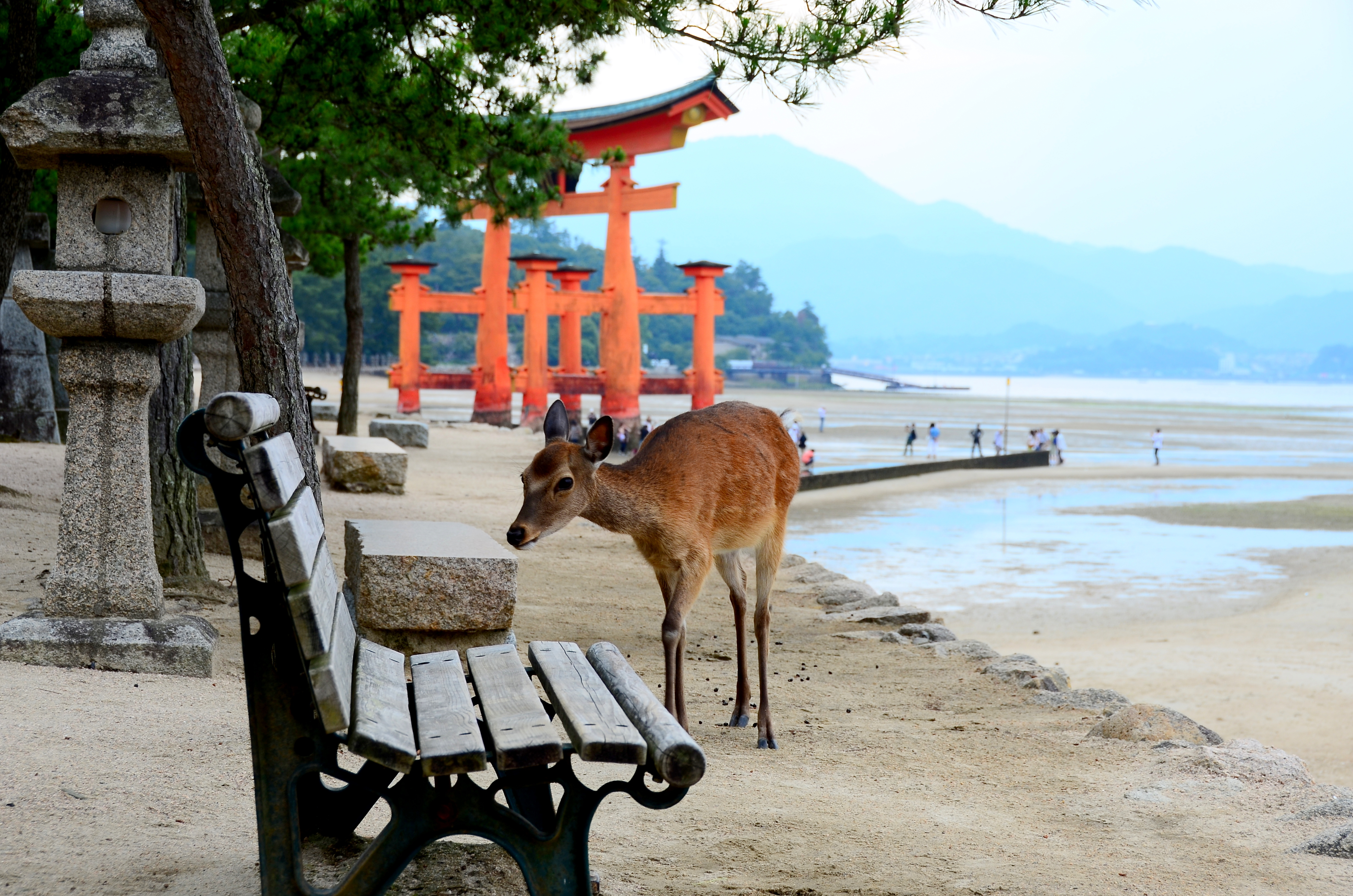
Deer near the torii gate

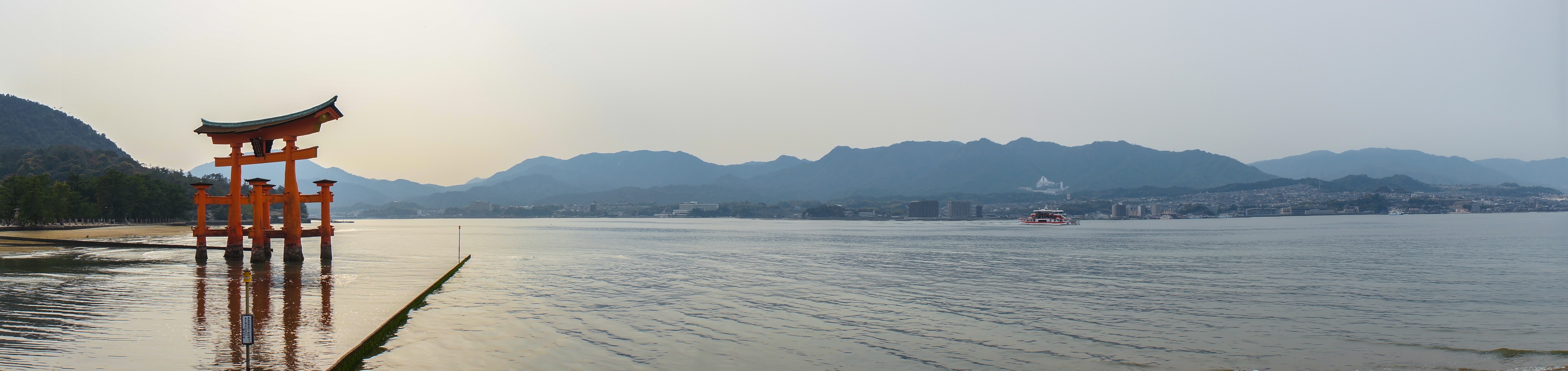
Panorama of the floating torii gate at Itsukushima Shrine

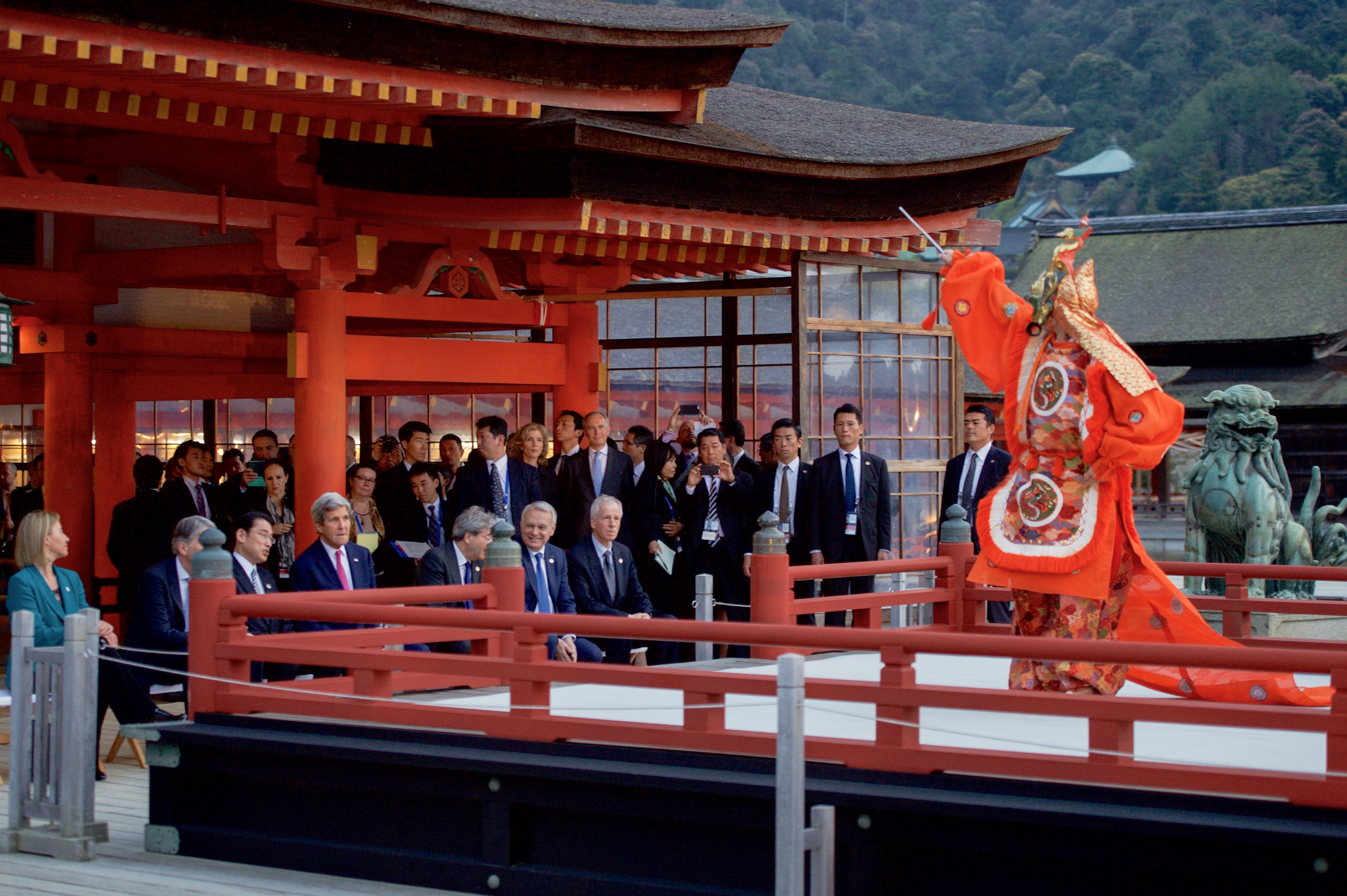
2016 G7 ministerial meetings

Inside of Itsukushima main shrine (Haiden)

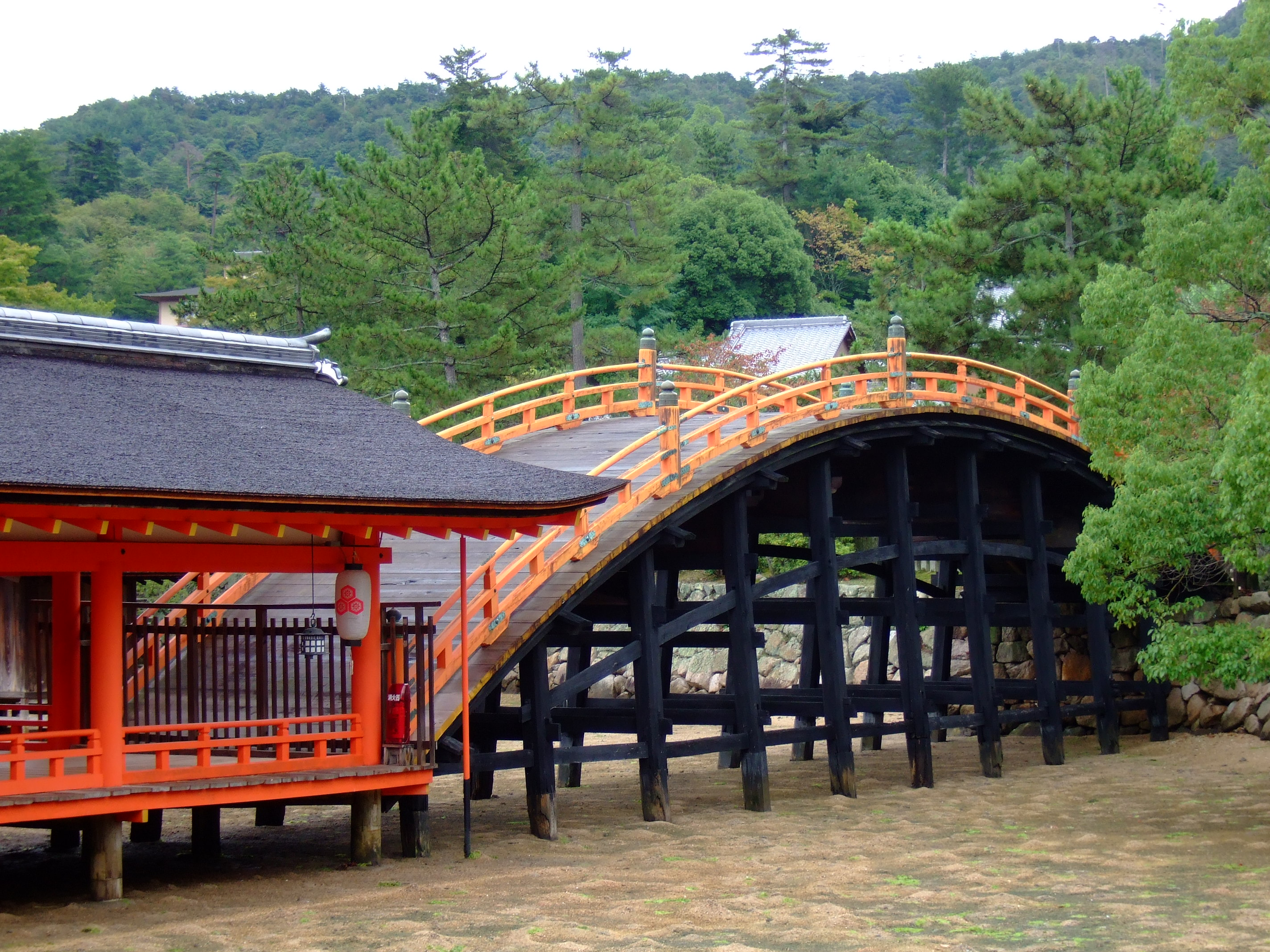
Bridge in Miyajima

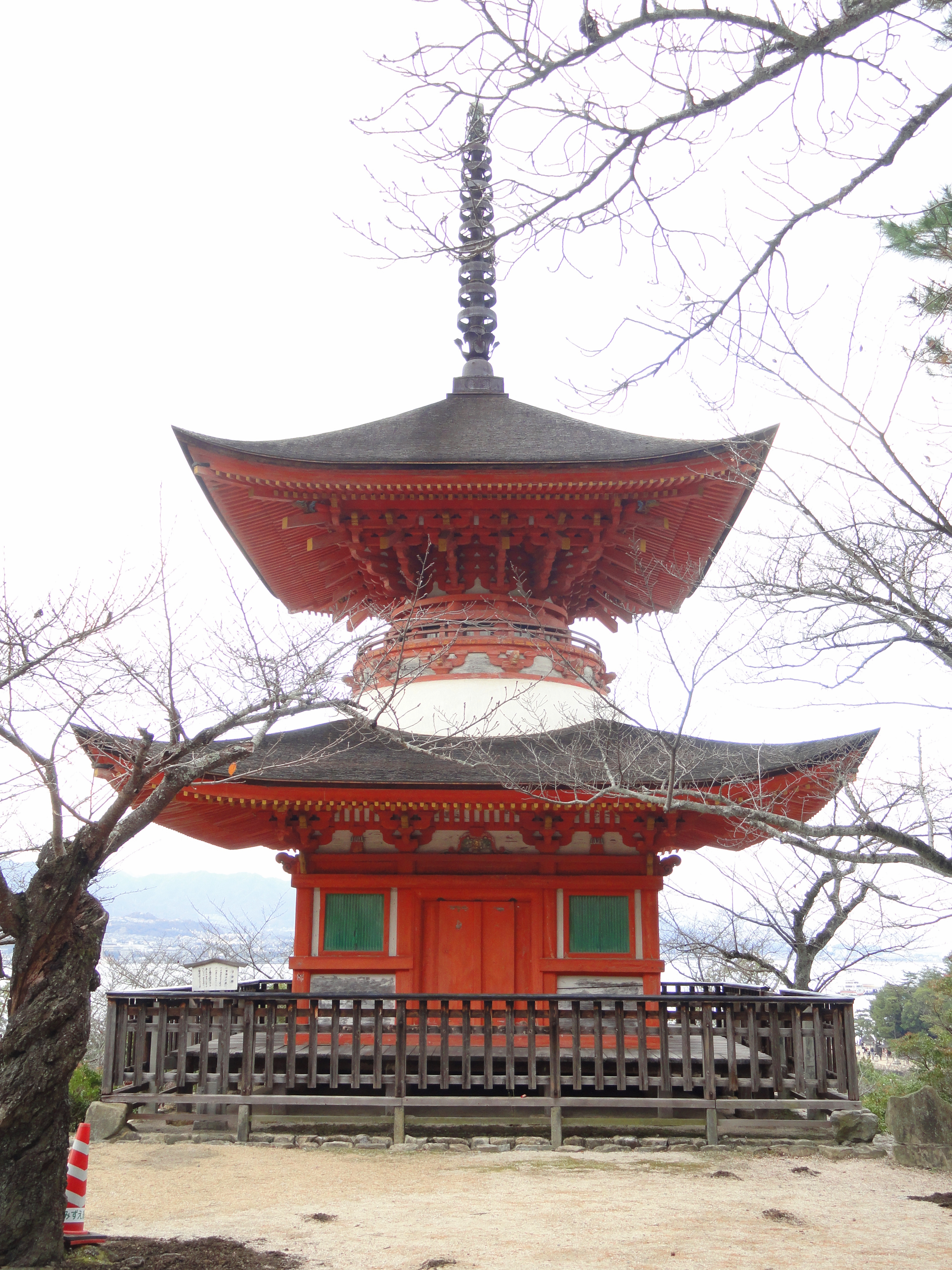
Tahōtō Pagoda

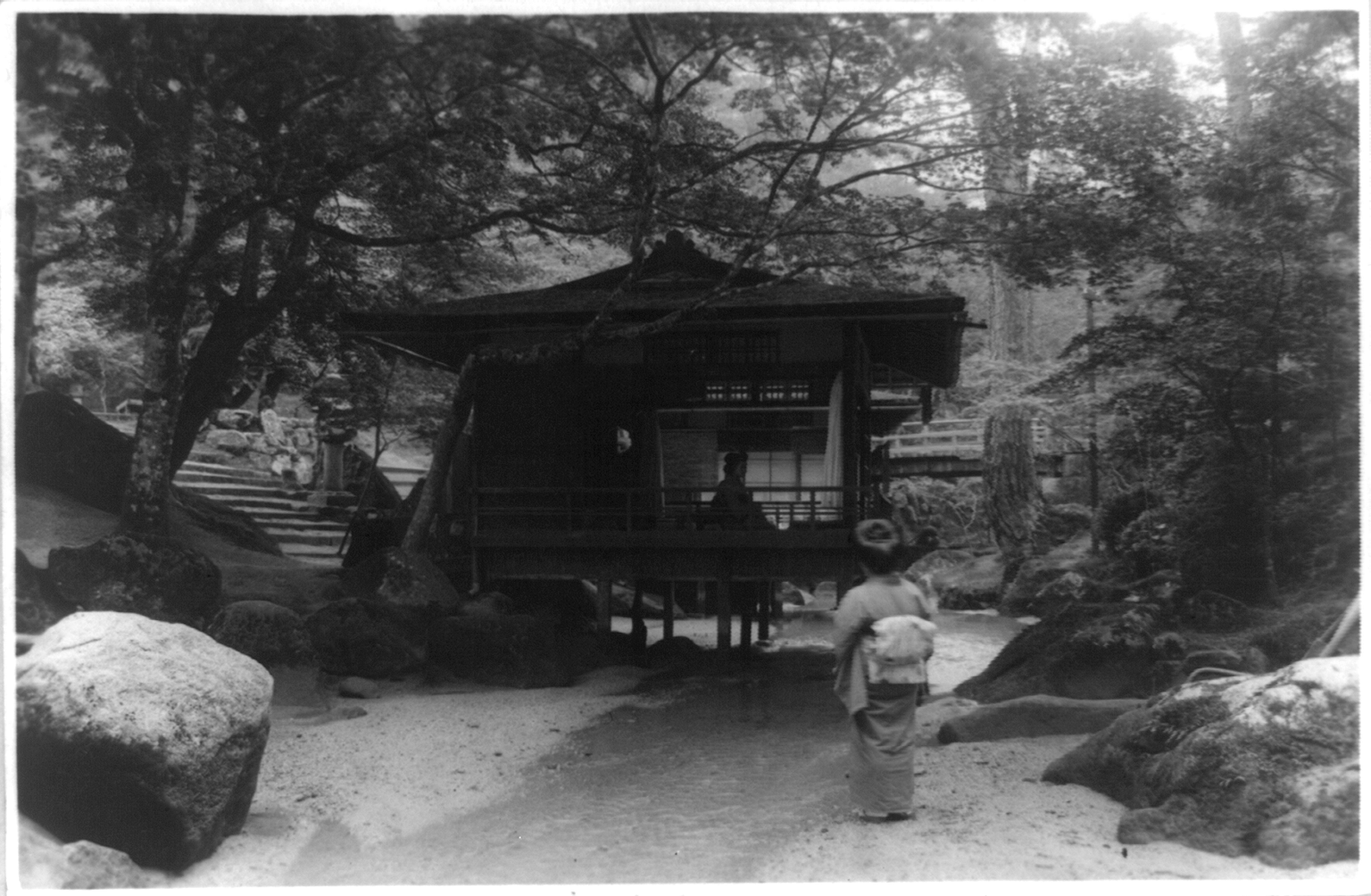
Chashitsu in its garden setting, circa 1900

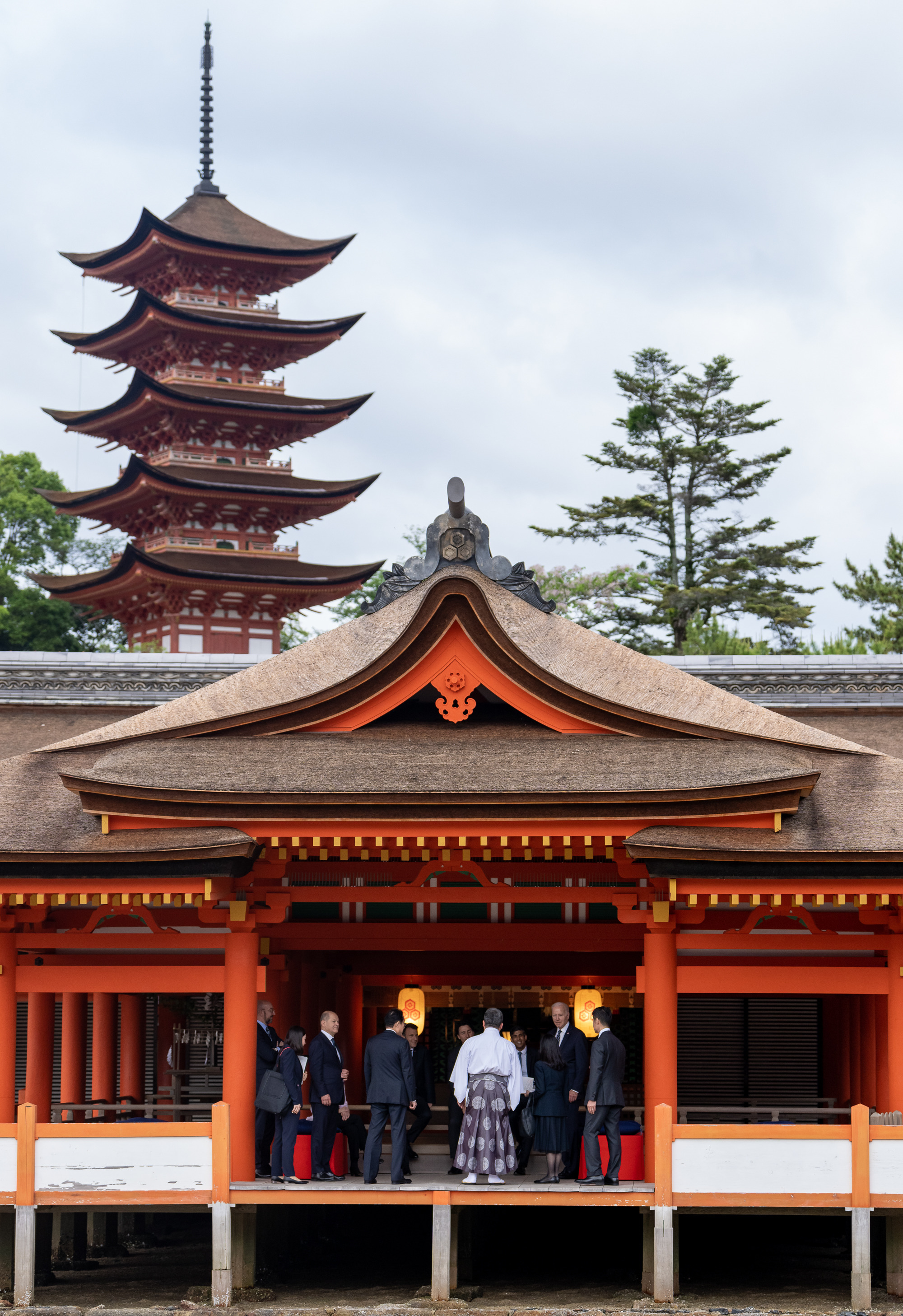
President Joe Biden greets Prime Minister Fumio Kishida and Chief Priest (Guuji) Motoaki Nosaka on May 19, 2023

=== Artwork ===
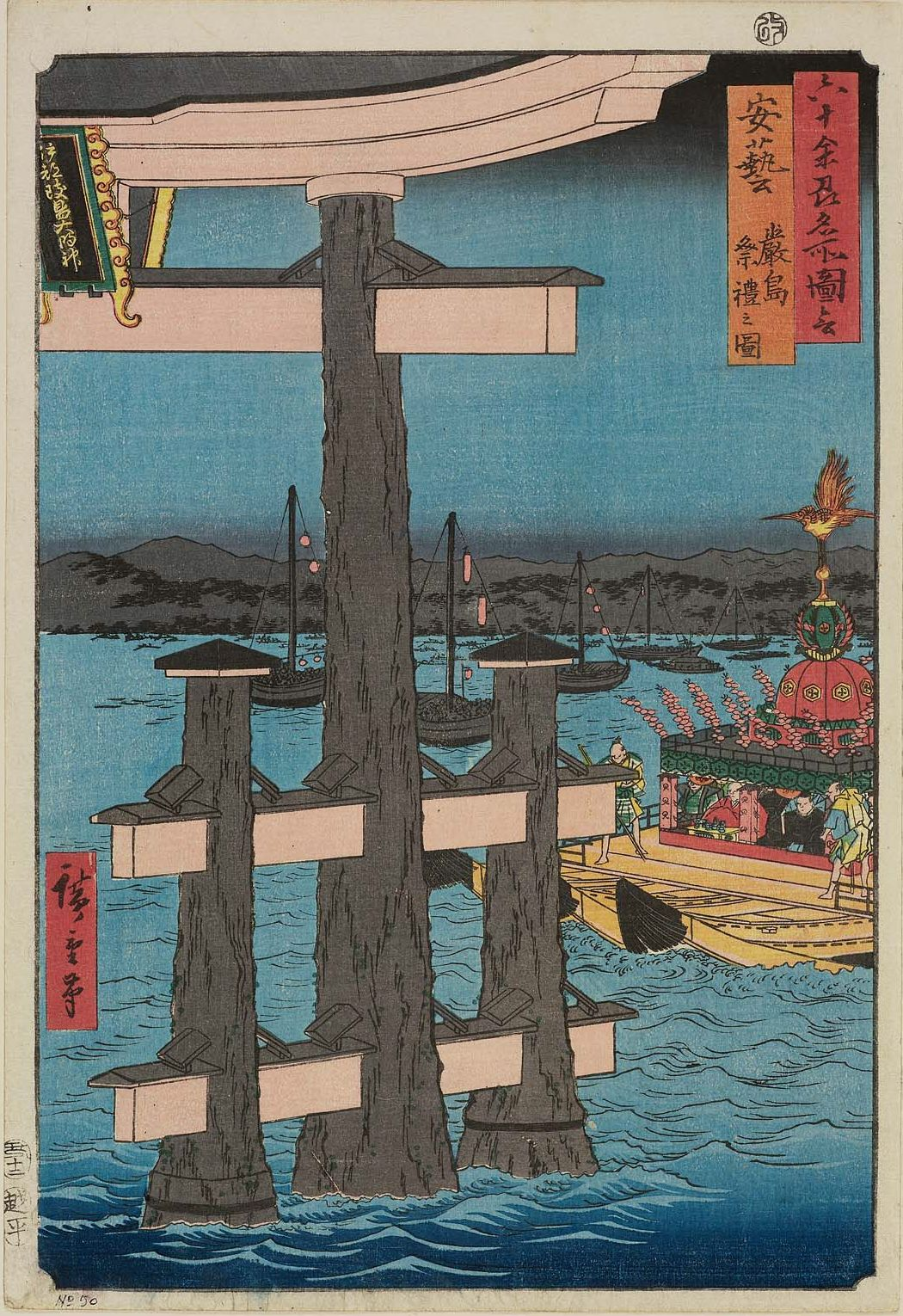
Aki Province: Itsukushima, Depiction of a Festival (Aki, Itsukushima, Sairei no zu) from Famous Views of the Sixty-odd Provinces by Hiroshige

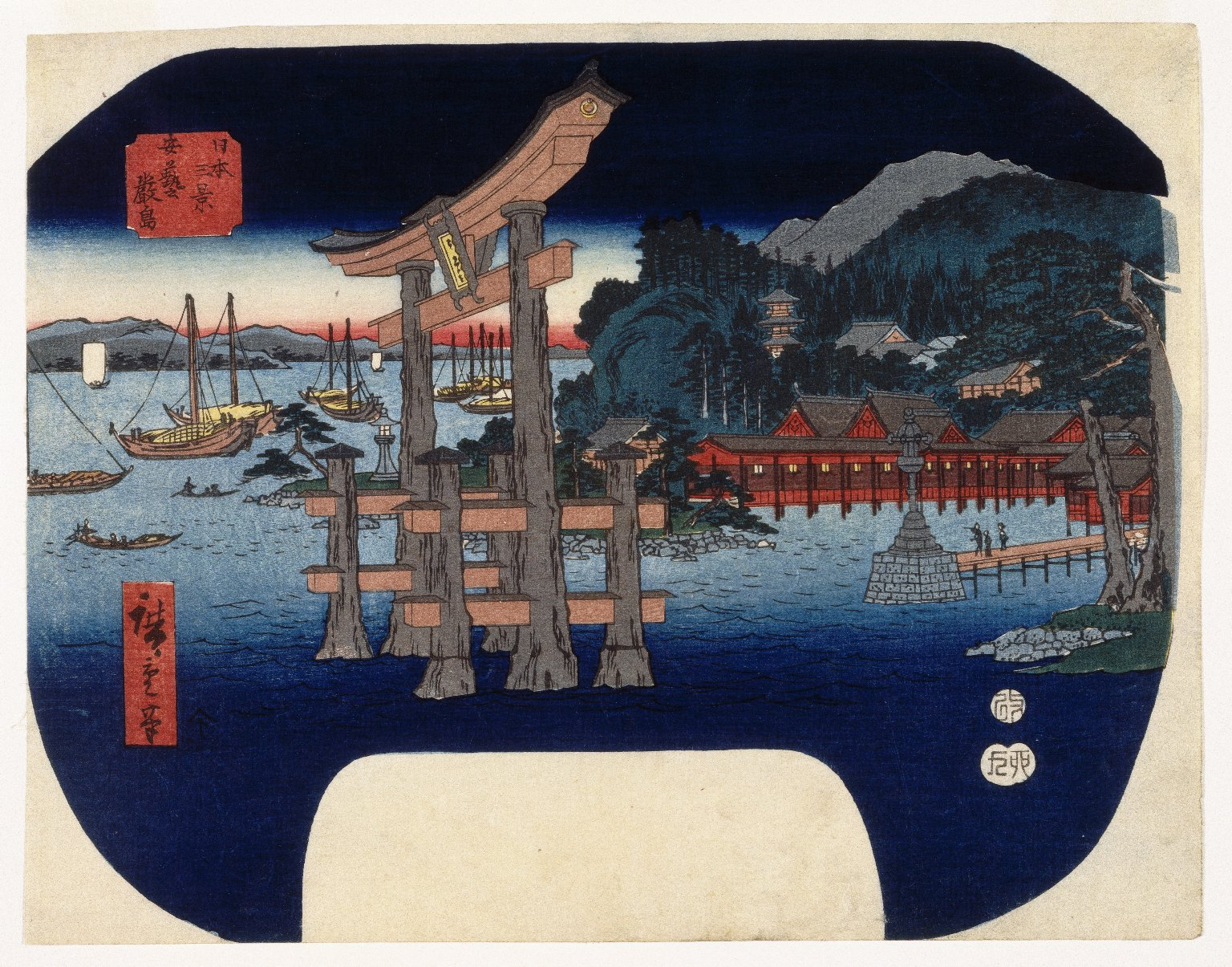
Itsukushima in Aki Province by Hiroshige

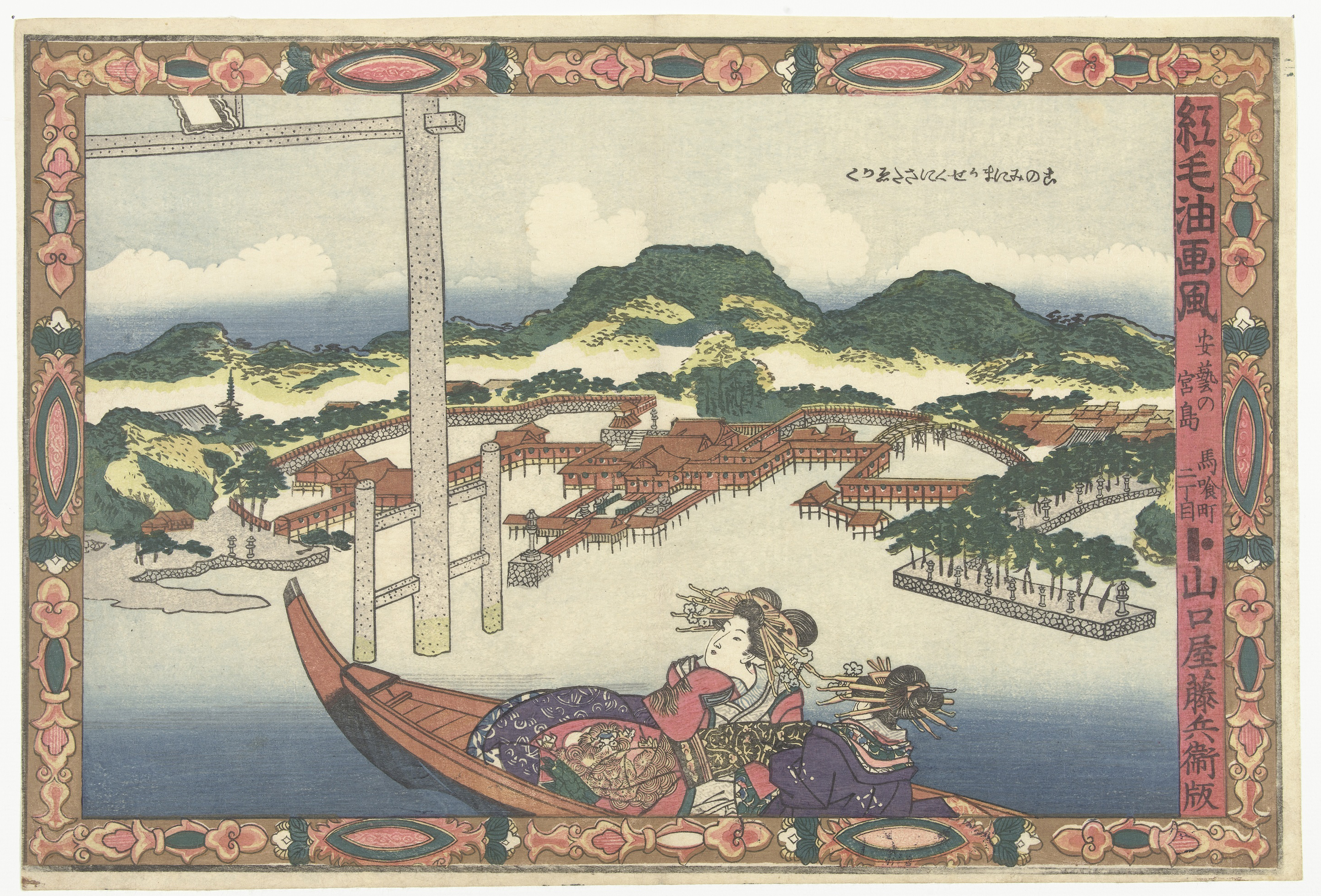
Miyajima in Aki Province by Kunisada

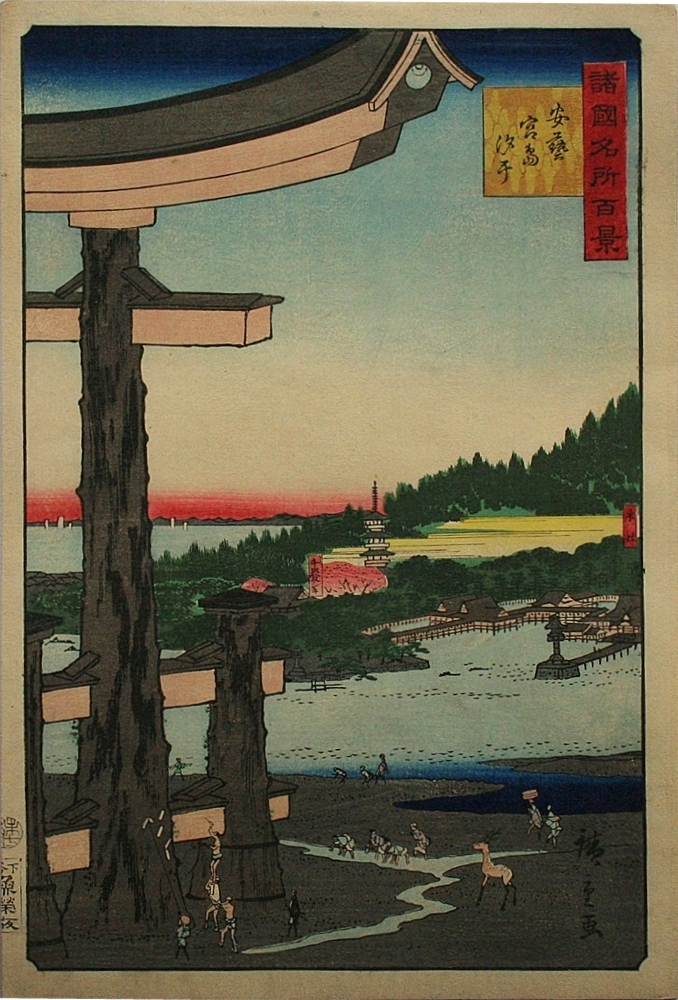
Aki Miyajima Shiohigari from 100 Views of the Provinces by Hiroshige II

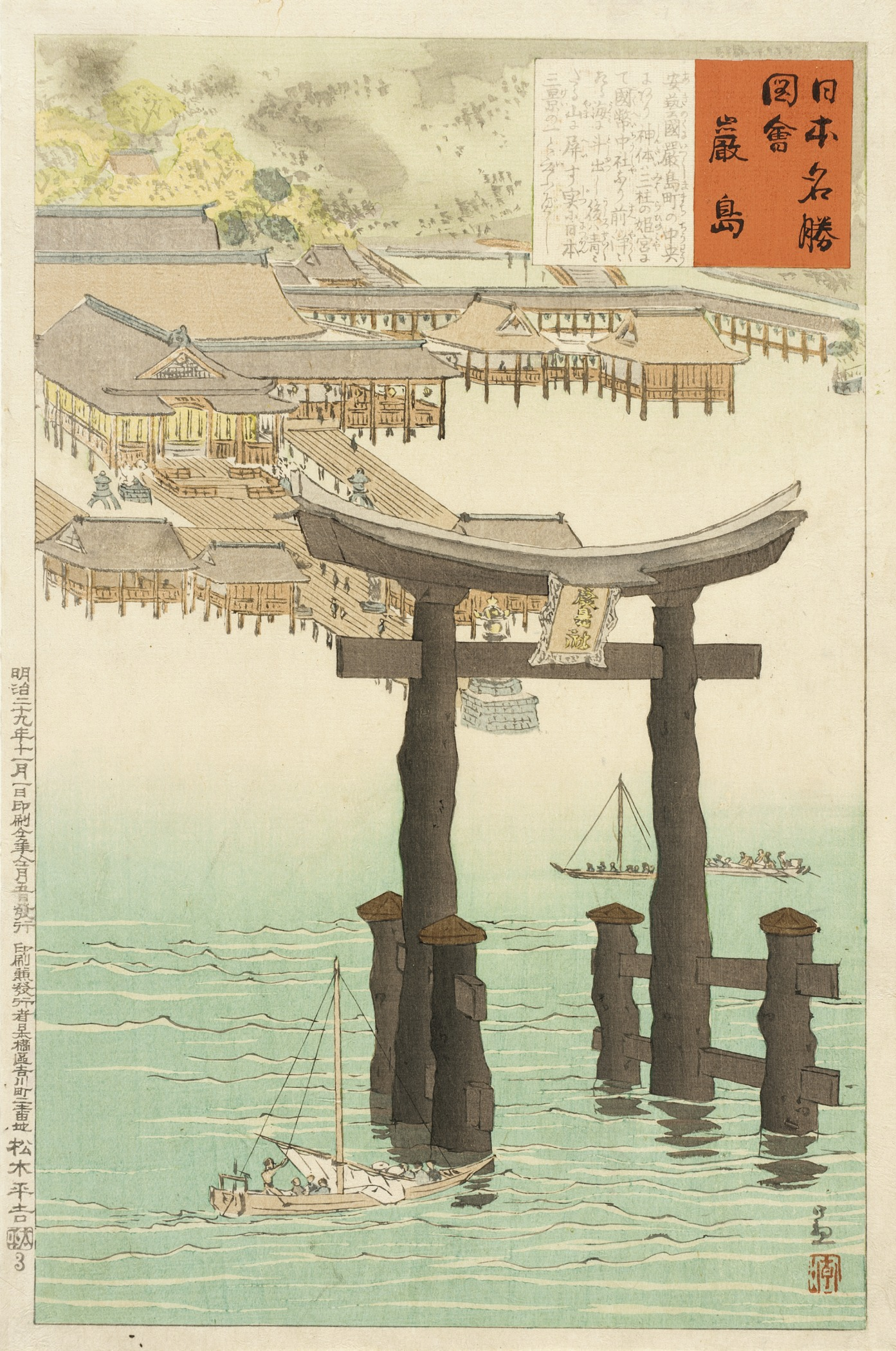
Itsukushima Shrine by Kobayashi Kiyochika

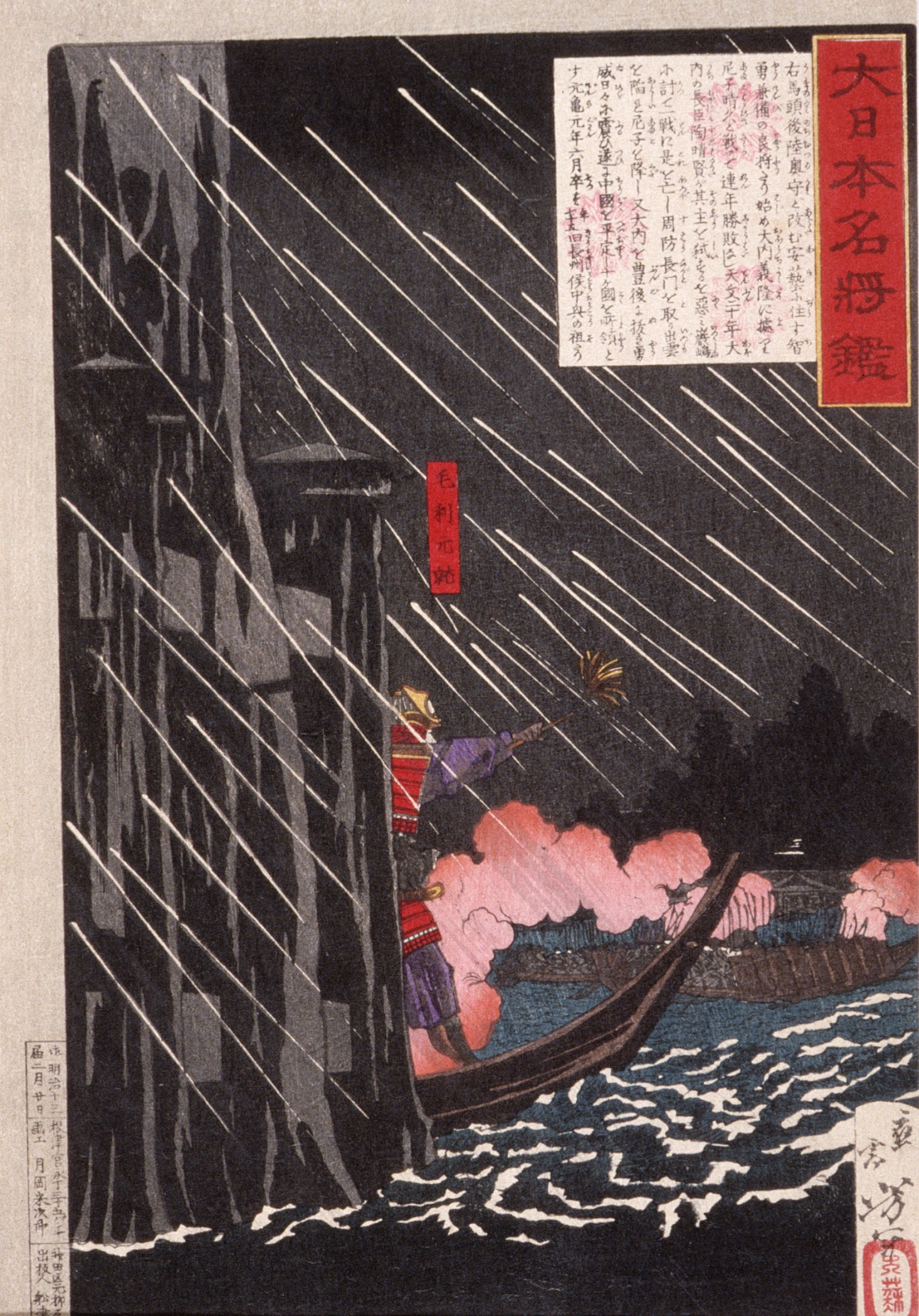
Mori Motonari Attacking Sue Harutaka at Itsukushima by Yoshitoshi

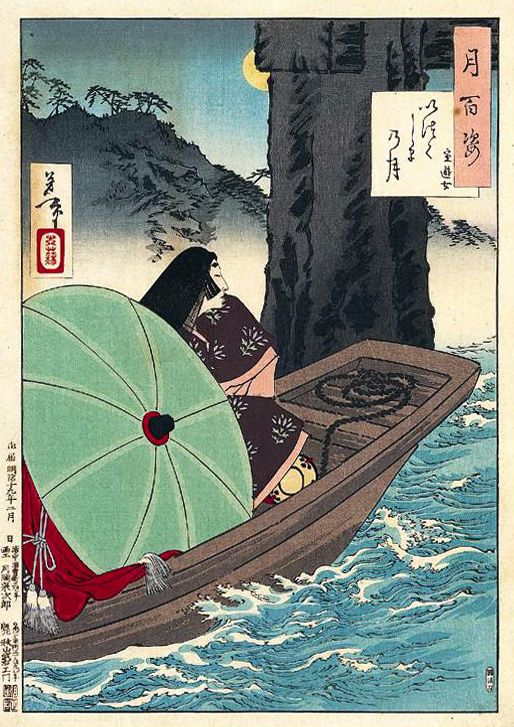
Itsukushima moon (Itsukushima no tsuki) by Yoshitoshi

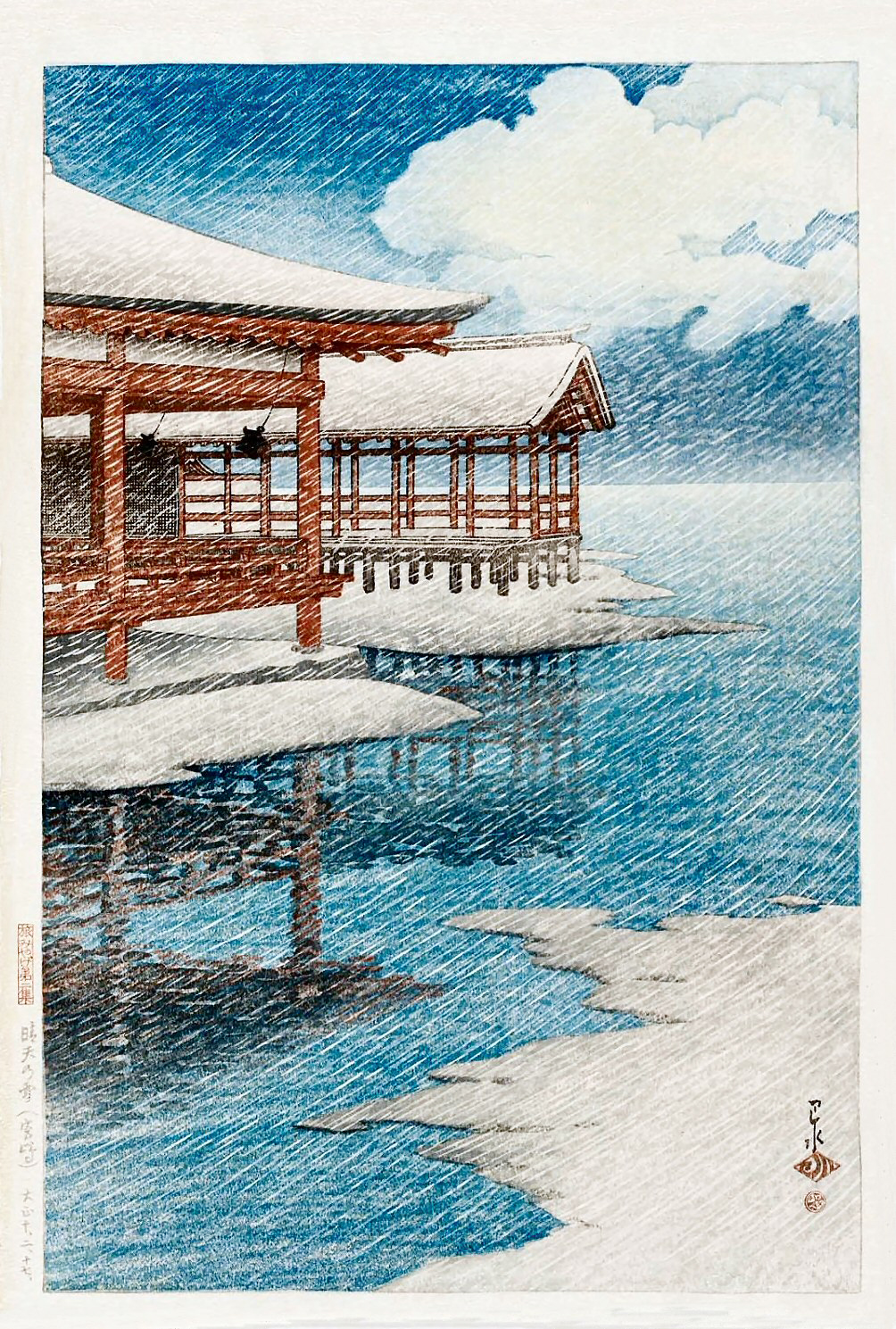
Snow on a clear day at Miyajima (Seiten no yuki [Miyajima]), woodblock print, from the series Souvenirs of Travel II (Tabi miyage dai nishū) by Hasui Kawase

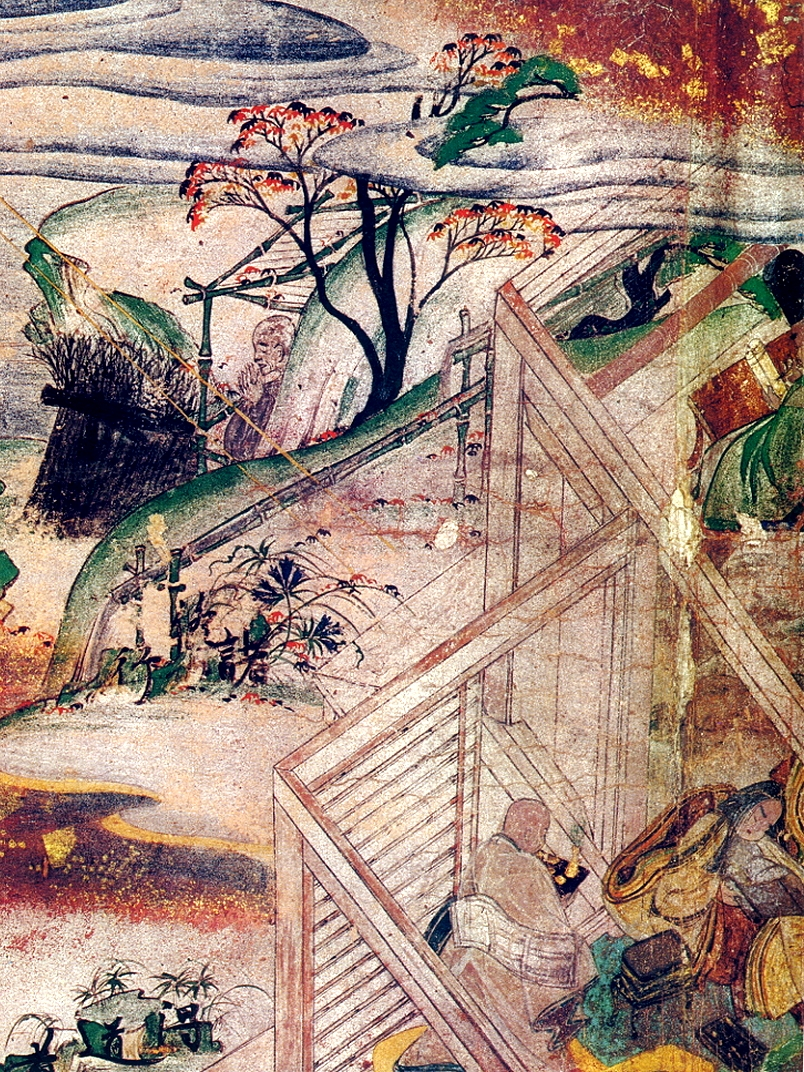
Illumination of Lotus Sutra donated in 1164

Itsukushima Shrine mon

== Replicas ==
A replica of the torii is at the Japan Pavilion at Epcot.

== See also ==
- Munakata Taisha, dedicated to the same goddesses
- List of National Treasures of Japan (crafts: others)
- List of National Treasures of Japan (crafts: swords)
- List of National Treasures of Japan (paintings)
- List of National Treasures of Japan (shrines)
- List of National Treasures of Japan (writings)
- List of Shinto shrines
- List of World Heritage Sites in Japan
- Modern system of ranked Shinto shrines
- Mont Saint-Michel, a sister city and a similar island-temple UNESCO World Heritage Site
- Three Views of Japan
- Tourism in Japan
- Twenty-Two Shrines
- Three Great Shrines of Benzaiten
- Hiroshima to Honolulu Friendship Torii (a half-size replica of the Itsukushima torii)
