= Hiroshima to Honolulu Friendship Torii =

Half-size replica of the torii at Itsukushima Shrine

Coordinates: 21.292602°N 157.822914°W

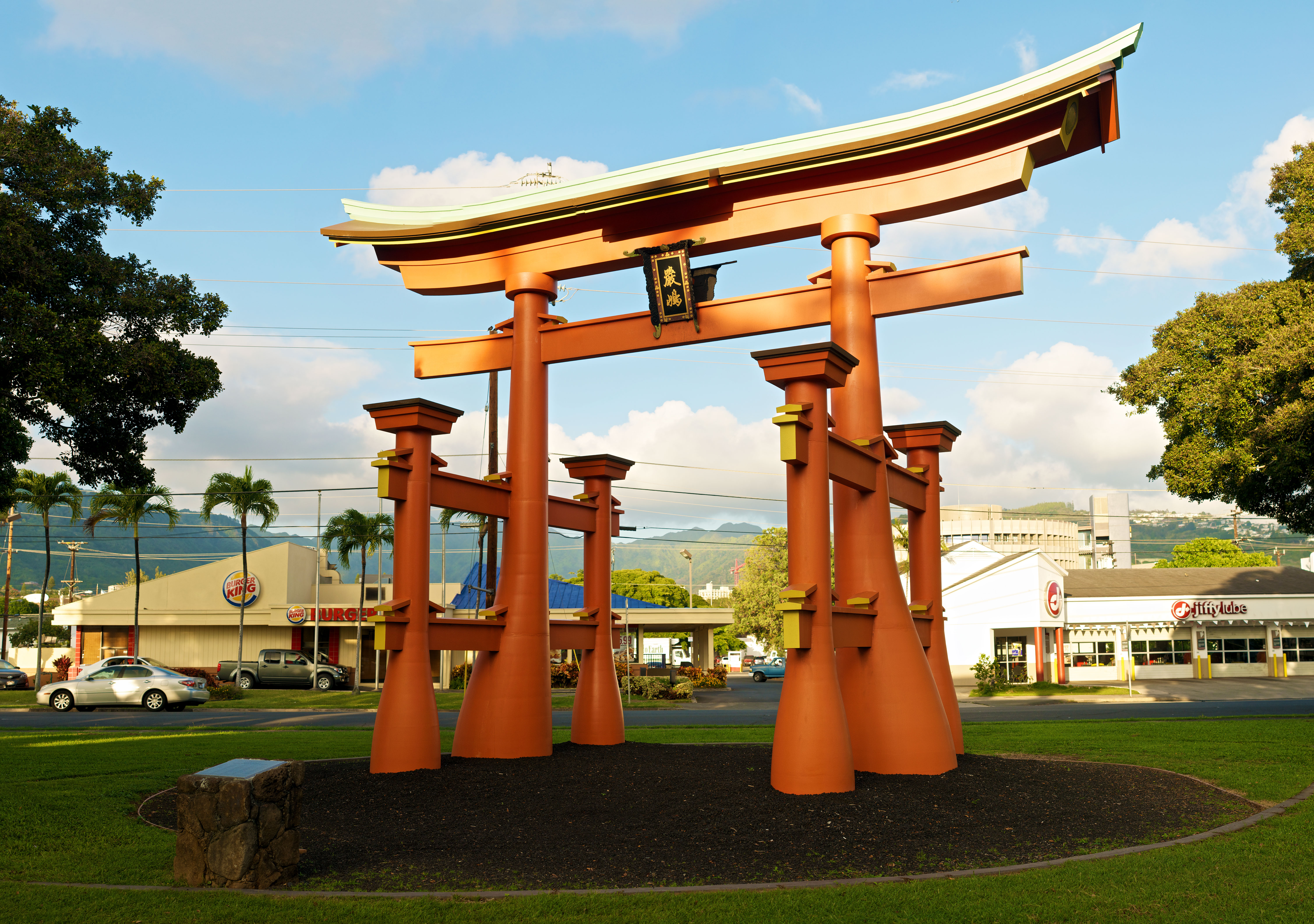
Itsukushima torii replica in Honolulu, Hawaii

The Hiroshima to Honolulu Friendship Torii is a half-size replica of the torii at Itsukushima Shrine (Japanese: 厳島神社 Itsukushima-jinja) located in the Mōʻiliʻili Triangle Park of Honolulu, Hawaii. The replica torii was presented as a gift from Honolulu's sister-city, Hiroshima, where the original torii is located. Although intended as an offering of friendship, this torii caused controversy for using state funds to pay for a religious monument.

== Plaques ==
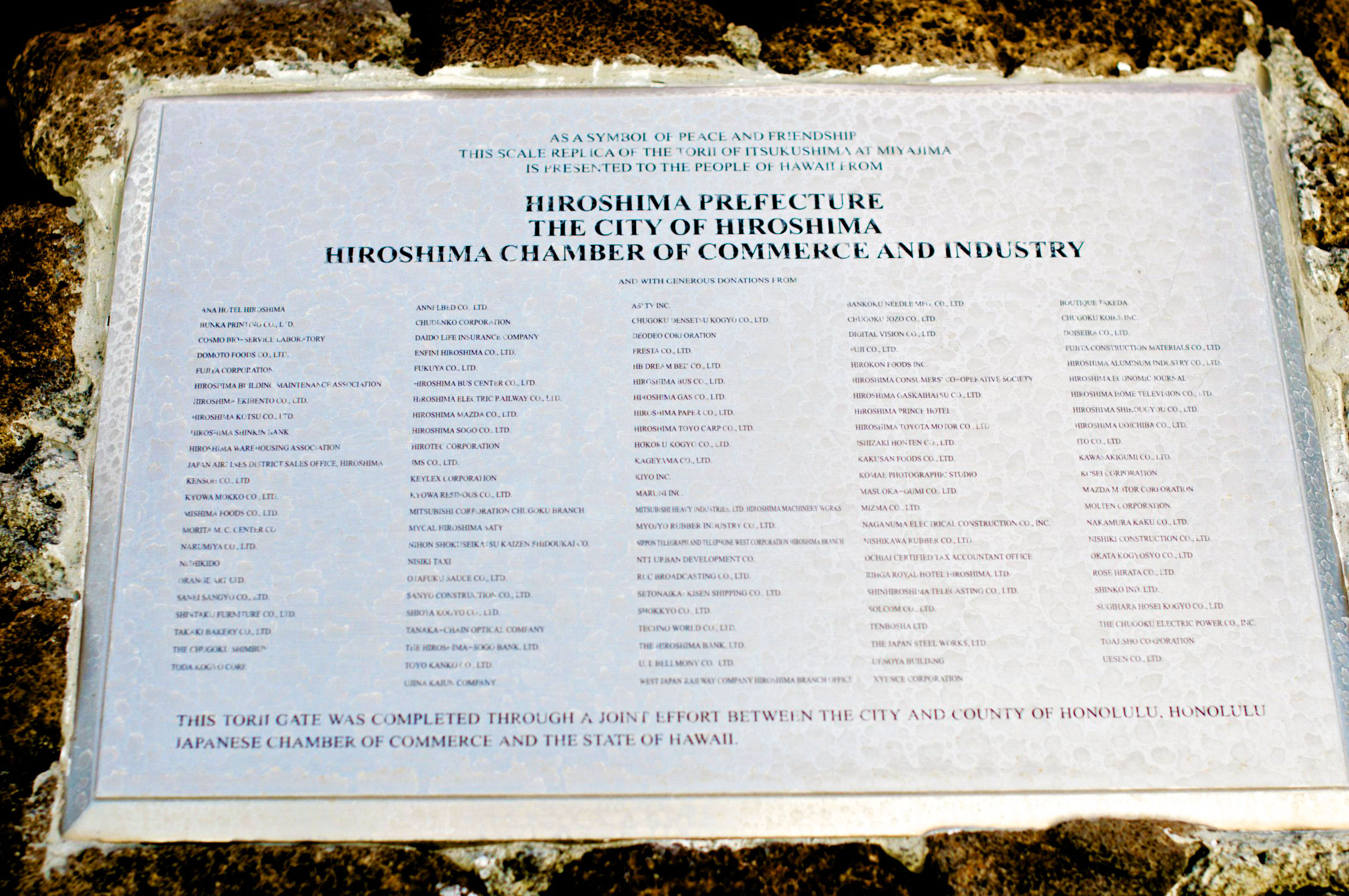
A plaque acknowledging help received in completing the project

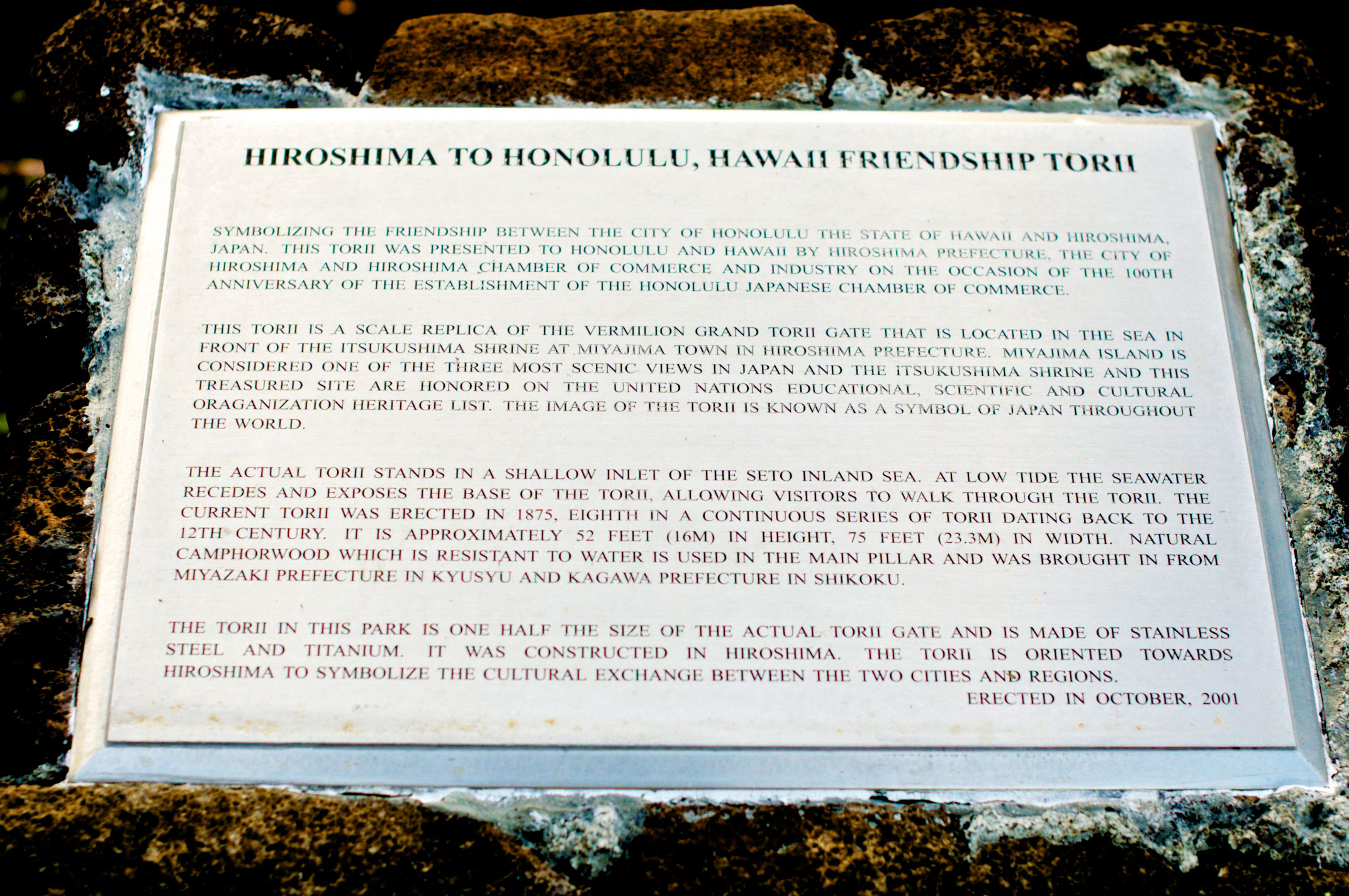
A second plaque describing the torii's inception

There are two plaques on opposing sides of the gate; one describes the impetus for creating the replica and the other gives recognition for those involved in erecting the torii.

The first plaque describes the inception behind the torii:

Hiroshima to Honolulu, Hawaii Friendship Torii

Symbolizing the friendship between the city of Honolulu the state of Hawaii and Hiroshima, Japan. This torii was presented to Honolulu and Hawaii by Hiroshima prefecture, the city of Hiroshima and Hiroshima chamber of commerce and industry on the occasion of the 100th anniversary of the establishment of the Honolulu Chamber of Commerce.

This torii is a scale replica of the Vermilion Grand Torii Gate that is located in the sea in front of the Itukushima Shrine at Miyajima town in Hiroshima Prefecture. Miyajima island is considered one of the three most scenic views in Japan and the Itsukushima Shrine and this treasured site are honored on the United Nations Educational, Scientific, and Cultural Organization heritage list. The image of the torii is known as a symbol of Japan throughout the world.

The actual torii stands in a shallow inlet of the Seto Inland Sea. At low tide the seawater recedes and exposes the base of the torii, allowing visitors to walk through the torii. The current torii was erected in 1875, eighth in a continuous series of torii dating back to the 12th century. It is approximately 52 feet (16m) in height, 75 feet (23.3m) in width. Natural camphorwood which is resistant to water is used in the main pillar and was brought in from Miyazaki Prefecture in Kyushu and Kagawa Prefecture in Shikoku.

The torii in this park is one half the size of the actual torii gate and is made of stainless steel and titanium. It was constructed in Hiroshima. The torii is oriented towards Hiroshima to symbolized the cultural exchange between the two cities and regions.

Erected in October, 2001

== Controversy ==
Although the torii itself was a gift from Hiroshima, the city of Honolulu spent $165,000 in order to erect the torii. This caused controversy because the torii is a religious monument of Shintoism, and spending state-allocated funds on a religious monument is a violation of the separation of church and state. Concerned citizens have expressed the replica torii's unavoidable religious aspects, however both the city of Honolulu and Hiroshima agree the gift is intended to be cultural and not religious.
