= Lists of World War II military equipment =

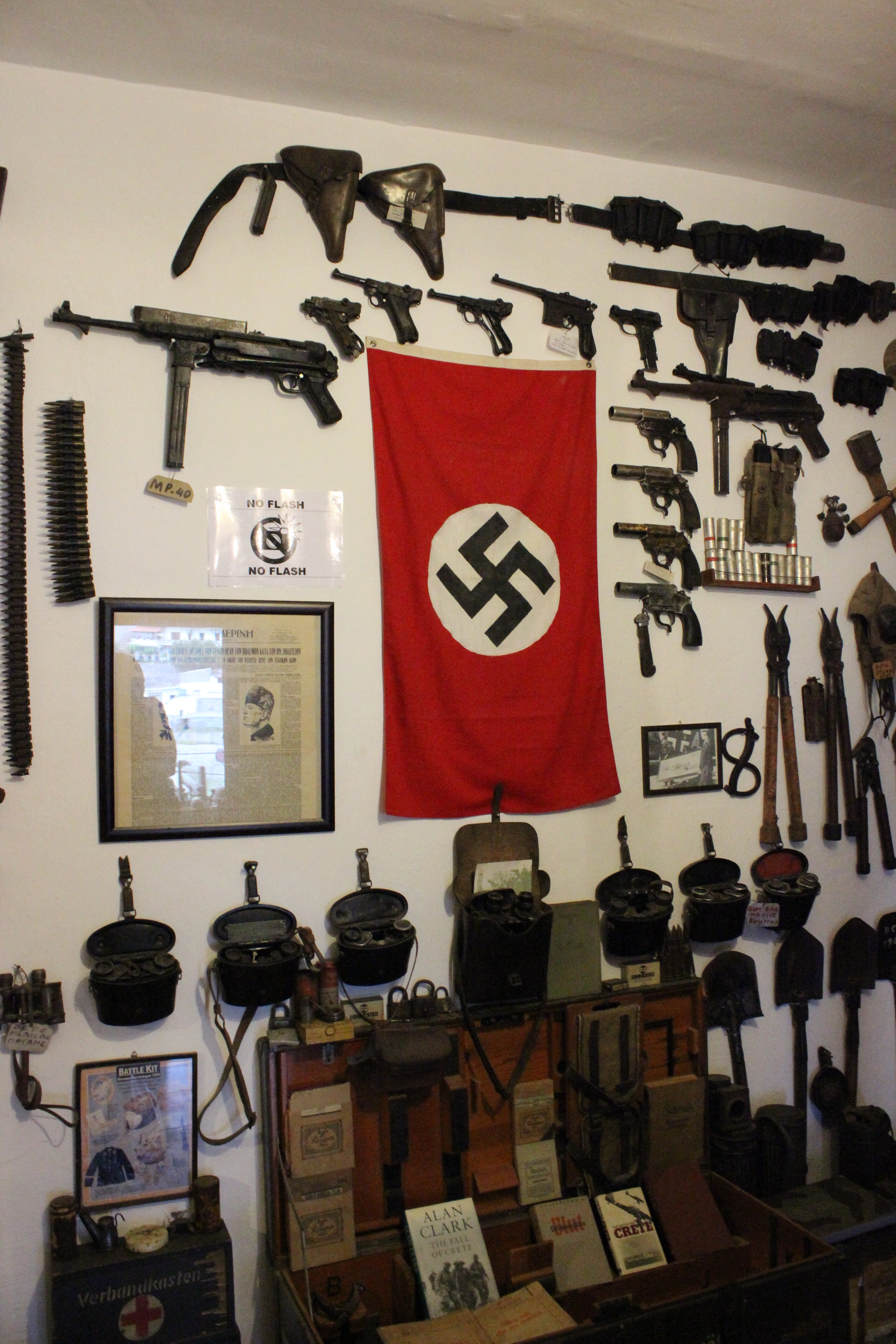
German infantry weapons in the Askifou War Museum, Crete

Lists of World War II military equipment are lists of military equipment in use during World War II (1939–1945). They include lists of aircraft, ships, vehicles, weapons, personal equipment, uniforms, and other equipment. There are aggregated military equipment lists by country, and lists of classes of equipment broken down by country or by type.

== Aircraft ==
- List of aircraft of World War II
- List of World War II military aircraft of Germany
- List of German aircraft projects, 1939–45
- List of aircraft of the French Air Force during World War II
- List of aircraft of the United States during World War II
- List of aircraft of the United Kingdom in World War II
- List of aircraft of the Red Army Air Forces
- List of Regia Aeronautica aircraft used in World War II
- List of aircraft of Japan during World War II
- List of aircraft of Finland in World War II
- List of aircraft of Poland during World War II
- List of aircraft of Greece in World War II
- List of aircraft of Yugoslavia in World War II
- List of aircraft of Hungary in World War II
- List of aircraft of Switzerland in World War II
- List of aircraft of Spain in World War II
- List of aircraft of Portugal in World War II
- List of aircraft of Ireland in World War II

== Ships ==
- List of ships of World War II
- List of aircraft carriers of World War II
- List of battleships of World War II
- List of coastal defence ships of World War II
- List of monitors of World War II
- List of destroyers of World War II
- List of frigates of World War II
- List of corvettes of World War II
- List of minor warships of World War II
- List of cruisers of World War II
- List of submarines of World War II
- List of ship classes of World War II

== Vehicles ==
- List of military vehicles of World War II
- List of armoured fighting vehicles of World War II
- List of prototype World War II combat vehicles

== Weapons ==
- List of World War II weapons
- List of World War II weapons of China
- List of common World War II infantry weapons
- List of secondary and special-issue World War II infantry weapons
- List of World War II firearms of Germany
- List of military equipment of Germany's allies on the Eastern front
- German designations of foreign artillery in World War II
- German designations of foreign firearms in World War II
- List of World War II weapons of Portugal

== Aggregated military equipment by country ==
- List of Australian military equipment of World War II
- List of Belgian military equipment of World War II
- List of British military equipment of World War II
- List of Bulgarian military equipment of World War II
- List of military equipment of the Canadian Army during the Second World War
- List of Chinese military equipment in World War II
- List of Croatian military equipment of World War II
- List of Danish military equipment of World War II
- List of Dutch military equipment of World War II
- List of Finnish military equipment of World War II
- List of World War II weapons of France
- List of German military equipment of World War II
- List of Greek military equipment of World War II
- List of Hungarian military equipment of World War II
- List of aircraft of Ireland in World War II
- List of Italian Army equipment in World War II
- List of Japanese military equipment of World War II
- List of Norwegian military equipment of World War II
- List of World War II weapons of Poland
- List of Portuguese military equipment of World War II
- List of Romanian military equipment of World War II
- List of Soviet Union military equipment of World War II
- List of Spanish military equipment of World War II
- Military equipment of Sweden during World War II
- List of Thailand military equipment of World War II
- List of Turkish military equipment of World War II
- List of equipment of the United States Army during World War II
- List of Yugoslav military equipment of World War II

== Personal equipment and uniforms ==
- List of World War II uniforms and clothing

== Other equipment ==
- List of World War II electronic warfare equipment

== See also ==
- Lists of military equipment
