= Switzerland during World War I and World War II =

History of Switzerland from 1914 to 1918 and 1939 to 1945

During World War I and World War II, Switzerland maintained armed neutrality and was not invaded by its neighbors, in part because of its heavily mountainous terrain. Switzerland built up its defence capabilities during this period to guard against an attack from neighbouring Germany, which never occurred. It served as a protecting power for the belligerents of both sides, with a special role in helping prisoners of war. The belligerent states made Switzerland a scene for diplomacy, espionage, and commerce, as well as a safe haven for 300,000 refugees.

== World War I ==
Swiss officers' barracks in the Umbrail Pass during World War I

Switzerland maintained a state of armed neutrality during the First World War. However, with two of the Central Powers (Germany and Austria-Hungary) and two of the Entente Powers (France and Italy) all sharing borders and populations with Switzerland, neutrality proved difficult. Under the Schlieffen Plan, the German General Staff had been open to the possibility of trying to outflank the French fortifications by marching through Switzerland in violation of its neutrality, although the plan's eventual executor Helmuth von Moltke the Younger selected Belgium instead due to Switzerland's mountainous topography and the disorganized state of the Belgian Armed Forces. From December 1914 until the spring of 1918, Swiss troops were deployed in the Jura Mountains along the French border over concern that the trench war might spill into Switzerland. Of lesser concern was the Italian border, but troops were also stationed in the Unterengadin region of Graubünden.

While the German-speaking majority in Switzerland generally favored the Central Powers, the French- and, later, Italian-speaking populations sided with the Triple Entente, which would cause internal conflict in 1918. However, the country managed to keep out of the war, although it was blockaded by the Allies and therefore suffered some difficulties. Nevertheless, because Switzerland was centrally located, neutral, and generally undamaged, the war allowed the growth of the Swiss banking industry. For the same reasons, Switzerland became a haven for foreign refugees and revolutionaries.

Following the organization of the army in 1907 and military expansion in 1911, the Swiss Army consisted of about 250,000 men with an additional 200,000 in supporting roles. Both European alliance-systems took the size of the Swiss military into account in the years prior to 1914, especially in the Schlieffen Plan.

Following the declarations of war in late July 1914, on 1 August 1914, Switzerland mobilized its army; by 7 August the newly appointed general Ulrich Wille had about 220,000 men under his command. By 11 August Wille had deployed much of the army along the Jura border with France, with smaller units deployed along the eastern and southern borders. This remained unchanged until May 1915 when Italy entered the war on the Entente side, at which point troops were deployed to the Unterengadin valley, Val Müstair and along the southern border.

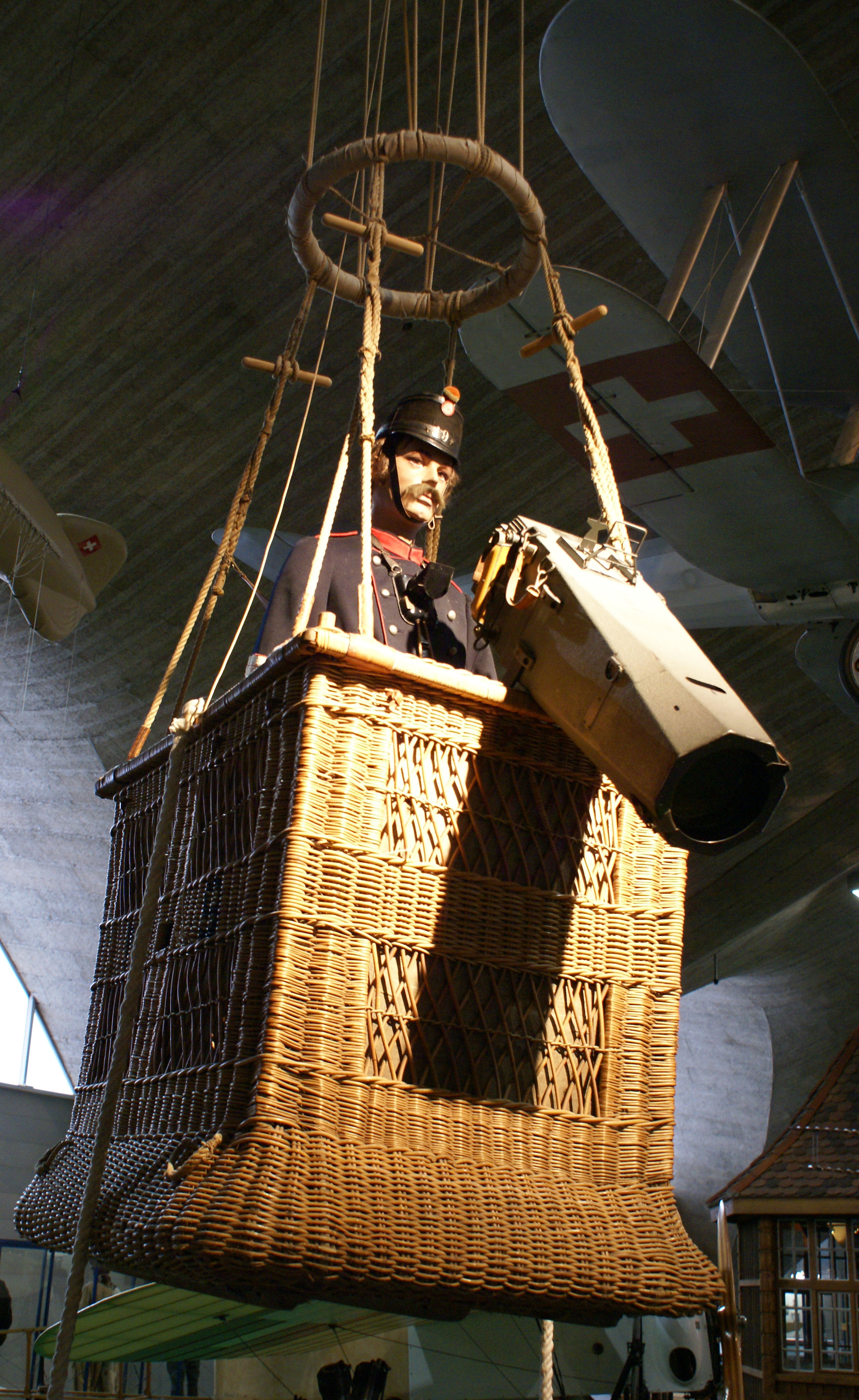
Replica of a balloon observer of the Swiss Army in World War I

Once it became clear that the Allies and the Central Powers would respect Swiss neutrality, the number of troops deployed began to drop. After September 1914, some soldiers were released to return to their farms and to vital industries. By November 1916 the Swiss had only 38,000 men in the army. This number increased during the winter of 1916–17 to over 100,000 as a result of a proposed French attack that would have crossed Switzerland. When this attack failed to occur the army began to shrink again. Because of widespread workers' strikes, at the end of the war the Swiss army had shrunk to only 12,500 men.

During the war, belligerents crossed the Swiss borders about 1,000 times, with some of these incidents occurring around the Dreisprachen Piz (Three Languages Peak), near the Stelvio Pass. Switzerland had an outpost and a hotel (which was destroyed as it was used by the Austrians) on the peak. During the war, fierce battles were fought in the ice and snow of the area, with gunfire coming on to Swiss territory. The three nations made an agreement not to fire over Swiss territory, which jutted out between Austria (to the north) and Italy (to the south). Instead they could fire down the pass, as Swiss territory was around the peak. In one incident, a Swiss soldier was killed at his outpost on Dreisprachen Piz by Italian gunfire.

During the fighting, Switzerland became a haven for many politicians, artists, pacifists, and thinkers. Bern, Zürich, and Geneva became centers of debate and discussion. In Zürich two very different anti-war groups, the Bolsheviks and the Dadaists, would bring lasting changes to the world.

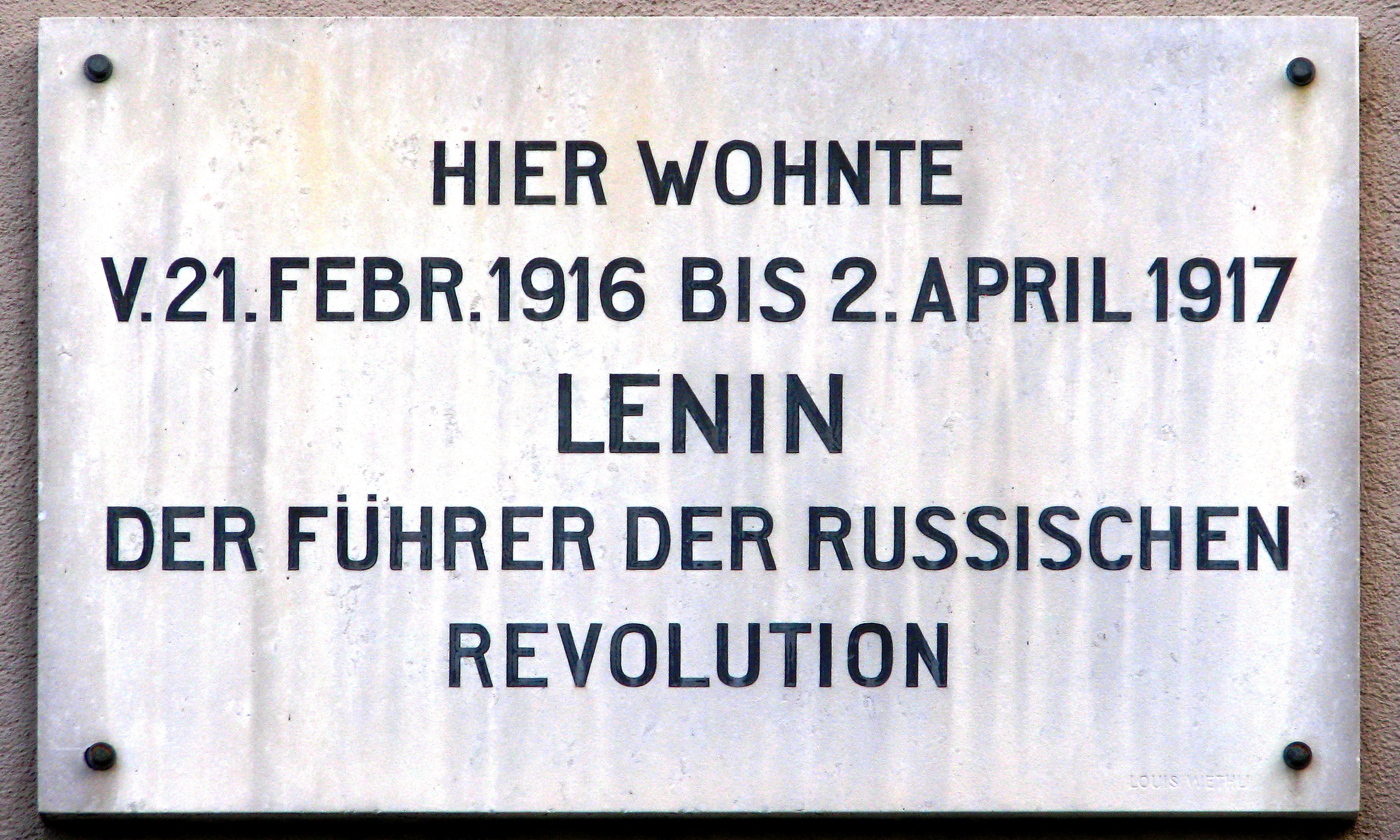
Plaque on Lenin's house at Spiegelgasse 14 in Zürich

The Bolsheviks were a faction of the Russian Social Democratic Labour Party, centered around Vladimir Lenin. Following the outbreak of the war, Lenin was stunned when the large Social Democratic parties of Europe (at that time predominantly Marxist in orientation) supported their various respective countries' war efforts. Lenin, believing that the peasants and workers of the proletariat were fighting for their class enemies, adopted the stance that what he described as an "imperialist war" ought to be turned into a civil war between the classes. He left Austria for neutral Switzerland in 1914 following the outbreak of the war and remained active in Switzerland until 1917. Following the 1917 February Revolution in Russia and the abdication of Tsar Nicholas II, he left Switzerland on a sealed train to Petrograd, where he would shortly lead the 1917 October Revolution in Russia.

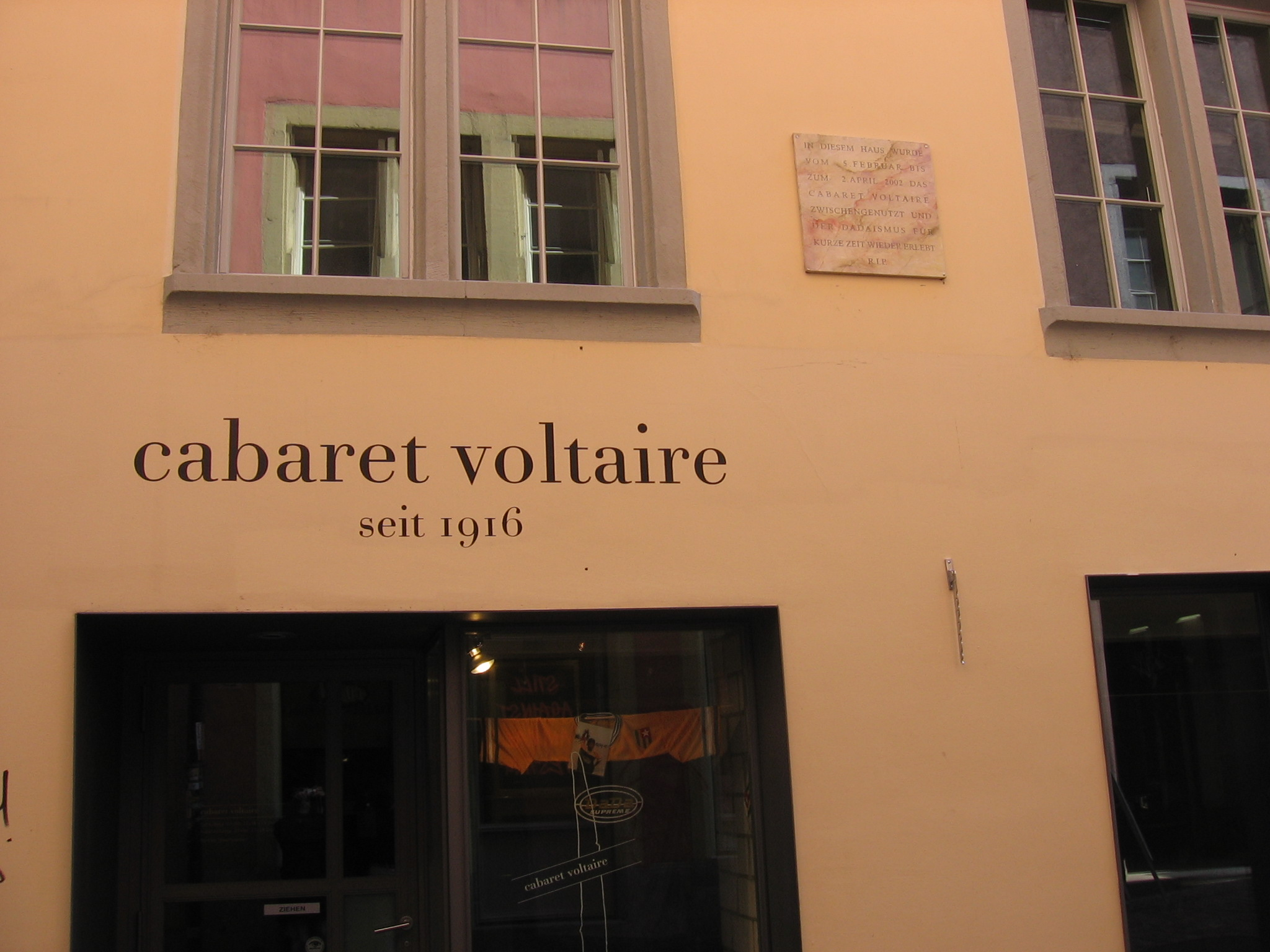
Cabaret Voltaire in Zürich, as it appeared in 2006

While the Dada art movement was also an anti-war organization, Dadaists used art to oppose all wars. The founders of the movement had left Germany and Romania to escape the destruction of the war. At the Cabaret Voltaire in Zürich they put on performances expressing their disgust with the war and with the interests that inspired it. By some accounts Dada coalesced on 6 October 1916 at the cabaret. The artists used abstraction to fight against the social, political, and cultural ideas of that time that they believed had caused the war. Dadaists viewed abstraction as the result of a lack of planning and of logical thought-processes. When World War I ended in 1918, most of the Zürich Dadaists returned to their home countries, and some began Dada activities in other cities.

In 1917 Switzerland's neutrality came into question when the Grimm–Hoffmann Affair erupted. Robert Grimm, a Swiss socialist politician, travelled to Russia as an activist to negotiate a separate peace between Russia and Germany, in order to end the war on the Eastern Front in the interests of socialism and pacifism. Misrepresenting himself as a diplomat and an actual representative of the Swiss government, he made progress but had to admit to fraud and return home when the Allies found out about the proposed peace deal. The Allies were placated by the resignation of Arthur Hoffmann, the Swiss Federal Councillor who had supported Grimm but had not consulted his colleagues on the initiative.

=== Switzerland hosts out-of-action POWs from the Entente and Central Powers ===
During the war Switzerland accepted 68,000 British, French and German wounded prisoners of war for recovery in mountain resorts. To be transferred, the wounded had to have a disability that would negate their further military service or have been interned over 18 months with deteriorating mental health. The wounded were transferred from prisoner of war camps unable to cope with the number of wounded and sat out the war in Switzerland. The transfer was agreed between the warring powers and organised by the Red Cross.

== Swiss independence during the interwar period ==
One potential result of World War I was an expansion of Switzerland itself during the interwar period. In a referendum held in the Austrian state of Vorarlberg on 11 May 1920, over 80% of those voting supported a proposal that the state join the Swiss Confederation. However, this was stopped by the opposition of the Austrian Government, the Allies, Swiss liberals, the Swiss-Italians and the Swiss-French.

However, the Principality of Liechtenstein managed to exclude itself from Austria in 1918 and signed a monetary and customs union with Switzerland that effectively guaranteed its independence. In 1920, Switzerland joined the League of Nations.

In 1934 the Swiss Banking Act was passed, enabling greater anonymity, in part allowing Germans (including Jews) to hide or protect their assets from seizure by the newly established Third Reich.

In 1936 Wilhelm Gustloff was assassinated at Davos; he was the head of the Nazi Party's "Auslands-Organisation" in Switzerland. The Swiss government refused to extradite the alleged assassin David Frankfurter to Germany. Frankfurter was sentenced to 18 years in prison but was pardoned in 1945.

As European tension grew in the 1930s, the Swiss began to rethink their political and military situation. The Social Democratic party abandoned their revolutionary and anti-military stances, and soon the country began to rearm for war. BGB Federal Councillor Rudolf Minger, predicting war would come in 1939, led the rebuilding of the Swiss Army. Starting in 1936, he secured a larger defence budget and started a war bond system. The army was restructured into smaller, better equipped divisions and boot camp for conscripts was extended to 3 months of instruction. In 1937 a war economy cell was established. Households were encouraged to keep a two-month supply of food and basic necessities. In 1938 Foreign Minister Giuseppe Motta withdrew Switzerland from the League of Nations, returning the country to its traditional form of neutrality.

Actions were also taken to prove Switzerland's independent national identity and unique culture from the surrounding Fascist powers. This policy was known as Geistige Landesverteidigung, or "spiritual national defence". In 1937, the government opened the Museum of Federal Charters. Increased use of Swiss German coincided with a national referendum that made Romansh a national language in 1938, a move designed to counter Benito Mussolini's attempts to incite Italian nationalism in the southern Grisons and Ticino cantons. In December of that year in a government address, Catholic-Conservative Councillor Philipp Etter urged a defence of Swiss culture. Geistige Landesverteidigung subsequently exploded, being featured on stamps, in children's books, and through official publications.

== World War II ==
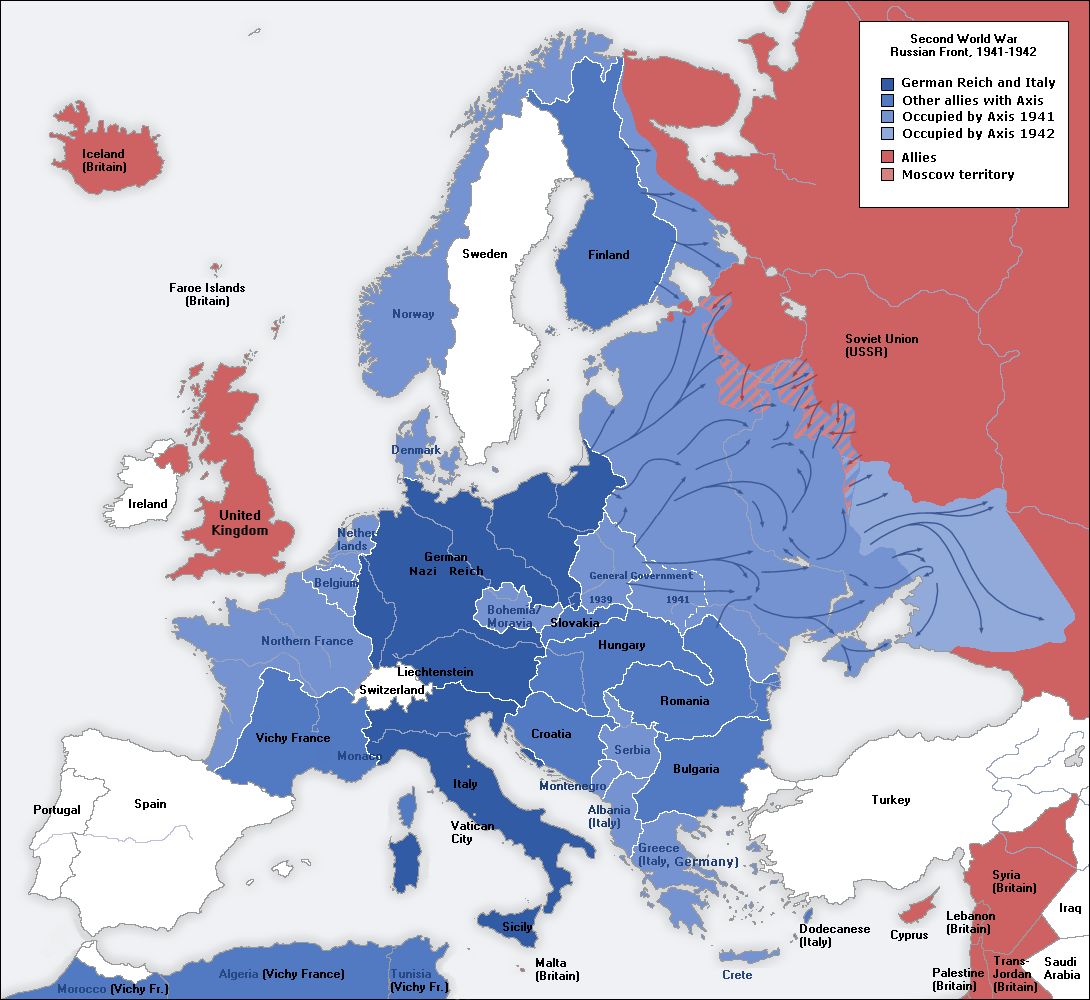
Switzerland was surrounded by territory controlled by the Axis powers from 1940 to 1944.

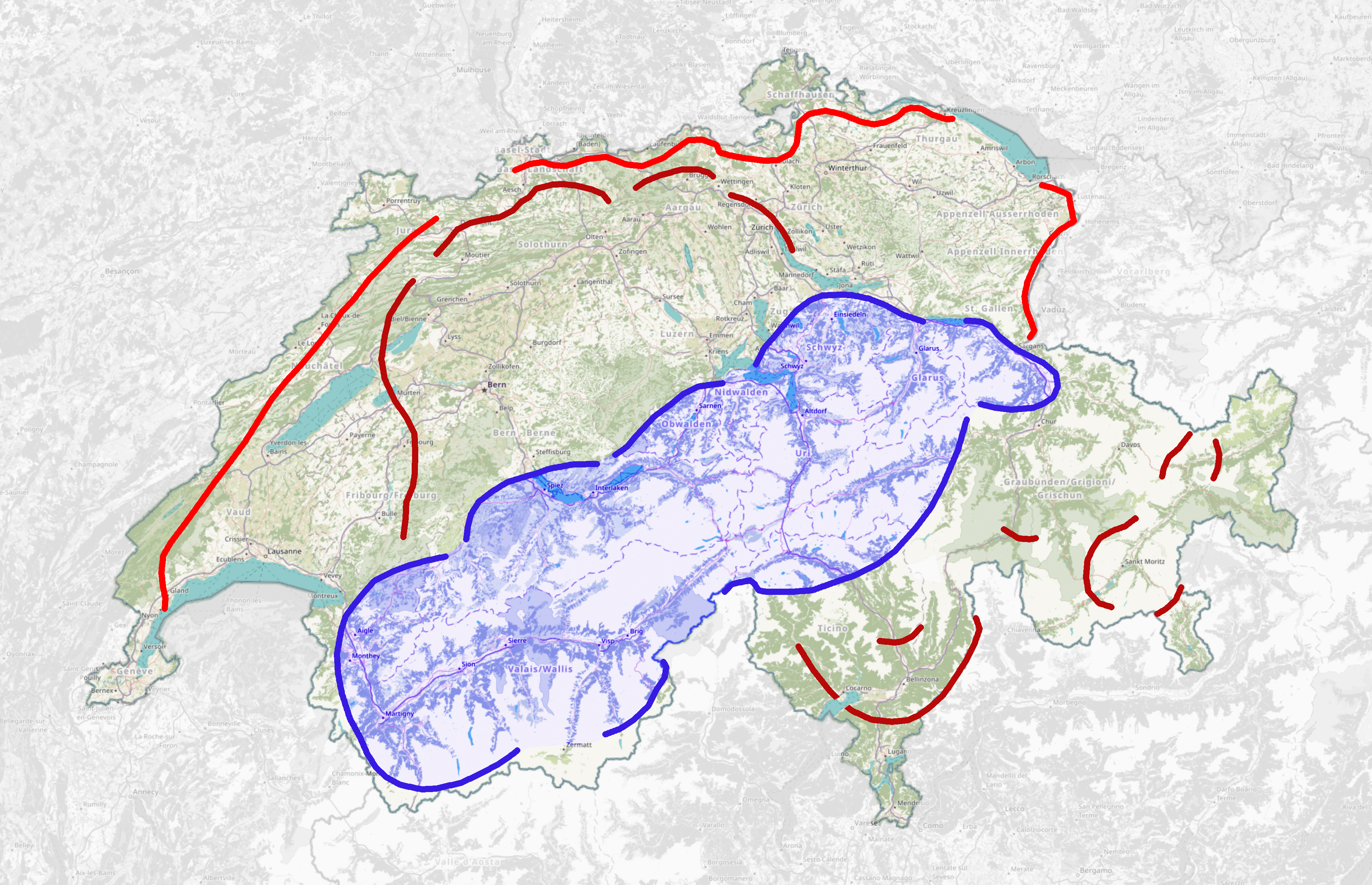
Plan of the defence lines of the National Redoubt

At the outbreak of World War II in 1939, Switzerland immediately began to mobilize for a possible invasion. The transition into wartime was smooth and caused less controversy than in 1914; the country was fully mobilized in only three days. Parliament quickly appointed 61-year-old career soldier Henri Guisan to be General and by 3 September 430,000 combat troops and 210,000 in support services, 10,000 of whom were women, had been mobilized, though most of these were sent home during the Phoney War. At its highest point, 850,000 soldiers were mobilized.

During the war, under the pan-Germanist Neuordnung doctrine, detailed invasion plans were drawn up by the German military command, such as Operation Tannenbaum, but Switzerland was never attacked. Switzerland was able to remain independent through a combination of military deterrence, economic concessions to Germany and good fortune as larger events during the war delayed an invasion. Attempts by the National Movement of Switzerland, a Swiss political party with Nazi sympathies (which never had more than 4,000 members out of a population of 4.2 million people, less than 0.1%) to effect a unification with Germany failed, largely as a result of Switzerland's sense of national identity and tradition of democracy and civil liberties. The Swiss press criticized the Third Reich, often infuriating its leadership. In turn, Berlin denounced Switzerland as a medieval remnant and its people renegade Germans. Swiss military strategy was changed from one of static defence at the borders to a strategy of attrition and withdrawal to strong, well-stockpiled positions high in the Alps known as the National Redoubt. This controversial strategy was essentially one of deterrence. The idea was to render the cost of invading too high. During an invasion, the Swiss Army would cede control of the economic heartland and population centres but retain control of crucial rail links and passes in the National Redoubt.

In 1941, Franz Burri, the leading Nazi propagandist for Switzerland, sent a letter to Heinrich Himmler in which he discussed the importance of a Nazi coup for Switzerland. Burri said he and his colleagues were "ready for action at any time" and had a paramilitary of 1,800 men prepared for deployment in all German-speaking Swiss cantons.

Switzerland was a base for espionage by both sides in the conflict and often mediated communications between the Axis and Allied powers by serving as a protecting power. In 1942, the United States Office of Strategic Services (OSS) was established in Bern. Through the efforts of Allen Dulles, the first US intelligence service in Western Europe was created. During the allied invasion of Italy, the OSS in Switzerland guided tactical efforts for the take-over of Salerno and the islands of Corsica and Sardinia.

Despite the public and political attitudes in Switzerland, some higher-ranking officers within the Swiss Army had pro-Nazi sympathies: notably Colonel Arthur Fonjallaz and Colonel Eugen Bircher, who led the Schweizerischer Vaterländischer Verband. In Letters to Suzanne (French: Lettres à Suzanne, Lausanne, Switzerland, 1949), the Swiss journalist Léon Savary retrospectively denounced in this sense "the occult influence of Hitlerism on the Swiss people during the Second World War, which they were not conscious of being under".

Between 1941 and 1943, Nazi sympathizers in the Swiss Red Cross organized four missions of medical personnel to German war hospitals to help the sick and injured in the eastern front.

=== Prosecutions for collaboration ===
Swiss military law provided for capital punishment for treason and certain other military offenses, such as desertion in the face of the enemy. During World War II, 33 people were sentenced to death for spying for Nazi Germany, 15 of them in absentia. Seventeen of those condemned were executed before the end of the war. With the exception of one man from Liechtenstein, all of those executed were Swiss. Hundreds of others were imprisoned for spying for Germany and acts against national security.

In January 1946, the Swiss government published a report on collaboration which, in the words of Swiss historian Luc van Dongen, "gave the public memory its memorial and ideology tone and also its clear conscience." From the end of the war to April 1949, the Federal Supreme Court of Switzerland held six trials against 102 Swiss citizens, who were charged with treason and undermining Swiss's neutrality and independence, for collaboration, of which 99 were convicted. Some of those convicted were tried in absentia. According to Martin Gutmann, the trials served as a way for the Swiss establishment to reinforce a convenient and simplistic myth over its wartime past. However, they constituted a genuine national cleansing of Nazism by targeting key ideological figures in Switzerland's Nazi movement. Many Swiss volunteers in the Waffen-SS were tried on lesser charges, including desertion, dereliction of duty, and unauthorized border crossing.

In 1953, Johannes Pauli, a dual-national with German citizenship, stood trial for crimes committed at the Bisingen concentration camp. He was one of only seven Nazi war criminals to be convicted by Swiss courts, three of whom were tried in absentia. All of the cases were tried under the regular Swiss Criminal Code, but the special nature of the trials was made clear in their files. Swiss police had received word of Pauli, who'd fled to Switzerland to avoid prosecution, from the French in 1947. Pauli, who denied any involvement in war crimes, was initially released due to a lack of evidence. Over the next few years, however, prosecutors compiled evidence and witness testimony against him. In 1951, under questioning, Pauli finally admitted to his involvement in the executions of two prisoners. He was also one of the two main participants in the Offenburg massacre, in which SS men massacred 41 concentration camp prisoners who were too weak to walk in 1945, and had been the leader of a six-man Feldgendarmerie squad in Ukraine, where he was most likely involved in the Holocaust. However, neither of these things were known at the time. In 1953, he was found guilty of murder for executing a prisoner for looting and ordering the executions of two other prisoners without trial, and sentenced to 12 years in prison. Pauli was released from prison in 1961, and died in 1969. According to historian Martin Faust, the participation of Swiss citizens in Nazi war crimes is "a topic that has so far been dealt with almost completely by German historiography and only insufficiently by Swiss historiography."

=== German violations ===
Nazi Germany repeatedly violated Swiss airspace. During the Battle of France in 1940, German aircraft violated Swiss airspace at least 197 times. In several air incidents, the Swiss shot down 11 Luftwaffe aircraft between 10 May and 17 June 1940, while suffering the loss of three of their own aircraft. Germany protested diplomatically on 5 June and with a second note on 19 June which contained explicit threats. Hitler was especially furious when he saw that German equipment was used to shoot down German pilots. He said they would respond "in another manner". On 20 June, the Swiss air force was ordered to stop intercepting planes violating Swiss airspace. Swiss fighters began instead to force intruding aircraft to land at Swiss airfields. Anti-aircraft units still operated. Later, Hitler and Hermann Göring sent saboteurs to destroy Swiss airfields but they were captured by Swiss troops before they could cause any damage. Skirmishes between German and Swiss troops took place on the northern border of Switzerland throughout the war.

=== Allied bombings and violations ===
Allied aircraft intruded on Swiss airspace throughout World War II. In total, 6,304 Allied aircraft violated Swiss airspace during the war.

Some damaged Allied bombers returning from raids over Italy and Germany would intentionally violate Swiss airspace, preferring internment by the Swiss to becoming prisoners of war. Over a hundred Allied aircraft and their crews were interned in this manner. They were subsequently put up in various ski resorts that had been emptied from lack of tourists due to the war and held until hostilities ended. At least 940 American airmen attempted to escape into France after the Allied invasion of Normandy in June 1944 but Swiss authorities intercepted 183 internees. Over 160 of these airmen were incarcerated in a Swiss prison camp known as Wauwilermoos, which was located near Lucerne and commanded by André Béguin, a pro-Nazi Swiss officer. The American internees remained in Wauwilermoos until November 1944 when the US State Department lodged protests against the Swiss government and eventually secured their release. The American military attaché in Bern warned Marcel Pilet-Golaz, Swiss foreign minister in 1944, that "the mistreatment inflicted on US aviators could lead to 'navigation errors' during bombing raids over Germany".

Switzerland, surrounded by Axis-controlled territory, also suffered from Allied bombings during the war; most notably from the accidental bombing of Schaffhausen by American aircraft on 1 April 1944. It was mistaken for Ludwigshafen am Rhein, a German town 284 kilometres (176 mi) away; forty people were killed and over fifty buildings destroyed, among them a group of small factories producing anti-aircraft shells, ball-bearings, and Bf 109 parts for Germany.

The bombing limited much of the leniency the Swiss had shown toward Allied airspace violations. Eventually, the problem became so bad that they declared a zero-tolerance policy for violation by either Axis or Allied aircraft and authorized attacks on American aircraft. Victims of these mistaken bombings were not limited to Swiss civilians but included the often confused American aircrews, shot down by the Swiss fighters as well as several Swiss fighters shot down by American airmen. In February 1945, 18 civilians were killed by Allied bombs dropped over Stein am Rhein, Vals, and Rafz. Arguably the most notorious incident came on 4 March 1945, when Basel and Zürich were accidentally bombed by American aircraft. The attack on Basel's railway station led to the destruction of a passenger train, but no casualties were reported; a B-24 Liberator dropped its bomb load over Zürich, destroying two buildings and killing five civilians. The crew claimed they believed that they were attacking Freiburg in Germany. As John Helmreich points out, the pilot and navigator, in choosing a target of opportunity, "missed the marshalling yard they were aiming for, missed the city they were aiming for, and even missed the country they were aiming for".

The Swiss, although somewhat skeptical, reacted by treating these violations of their neutrality as "accidents". The US was warned that single aircraft would be forced down and their crews would still be allowed to seek refuge, while bomber formations in violation of airspace would be intercepted. While American politicians and diplomats tried to minimize the political damage caused by these incidents, others took a more hostile view. Some senior commanders argued that as Switzerland was "full of German sympathizers," it deserved to be bombed. General Henry H. Arnold, Commanding General of the US Army Air Forces, even suggested that it was the Germans themselves who were flying captured Allied planes over Switzerland in an attempt to gain a propaganda victory.

From 1943 onwards Switzerland stopped American and British aircraft, mainly bombers, overflying Switzerland on nine occasions, six times by Swiss Air Force fighters and nine by flak. Thirty-six Allied airmen were killed. On 1 October 1943 the first American bomber was shot down near Bad Ragaz, with only three men surviving. The officers were interned in Davos and the airmen in Adelboden. The representative of the US military intelligence group based in Bern, Barnwell Legge (a US military attaché to Switzerland), instructed the soldiers not to flee, but most of them thought it to be a diplomatic joke and gave no regard to his request.

=== Jewish refugees ===
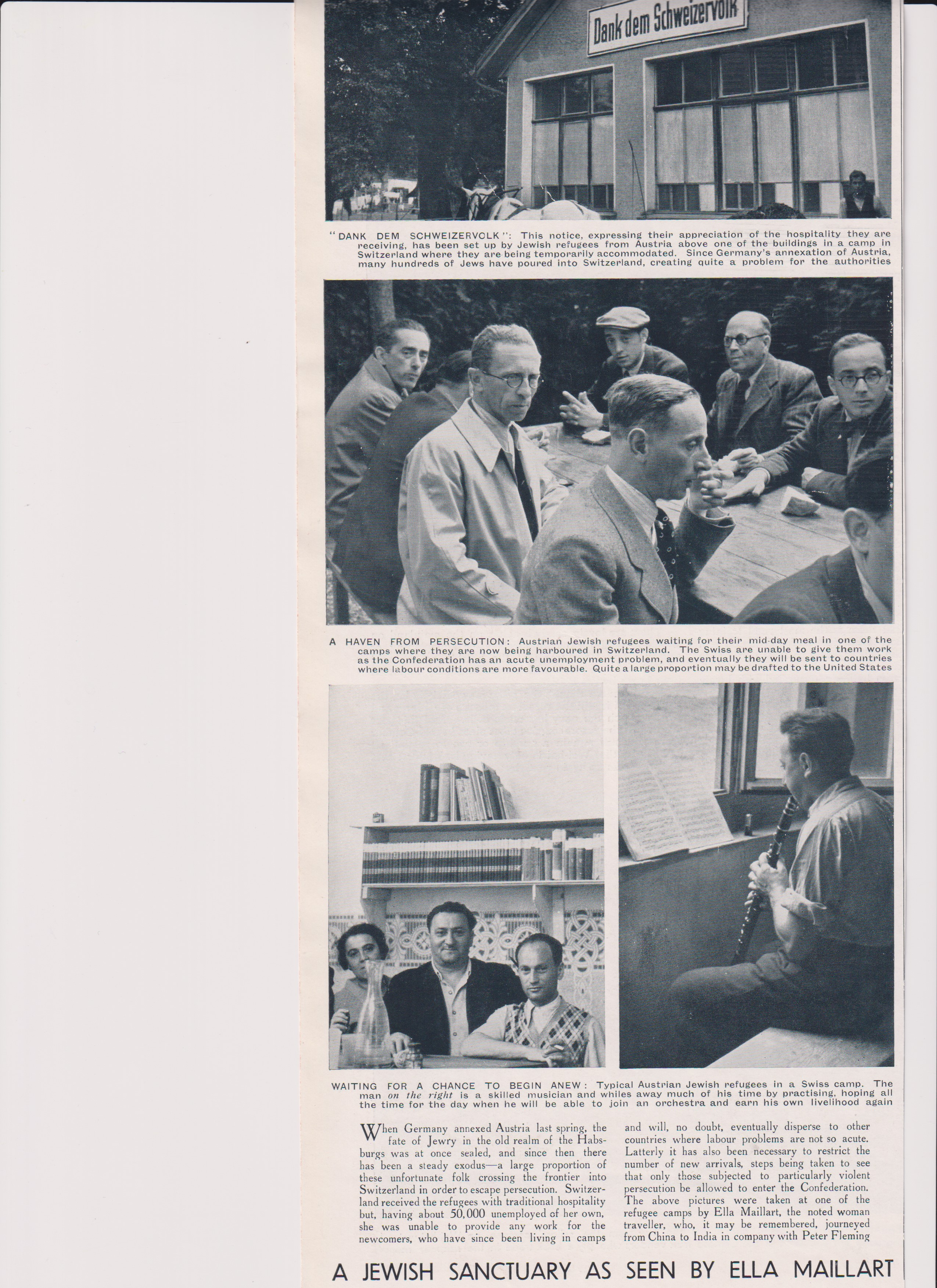
Ella Maillart's article about Jewish refugees in Switzerland, 1938, in the collection of the Jewish Museum of Switzerland

As a neutral state bordering Germany, Switzerland was relatively easy to reach for refugees from the Nazis. Switzerland's refugee laws, especially with respect to Jews fleeing Germany, were strict and have caused controversy since the end of World War II. From 1933 until 1944 asylum for refugees could only be granted to those who were under personal threat owing to their political activities only; it did not include those who were under threat due to race, religion or ethnicity. On the basis of this definition, Switzerland granted asylum to only 644 people between 1933 and 1945; of these, 252 cases were admitted during the war. All other refugees were admitted by the individual cantons and were granted different permits, including a "tolerance permit" that allowed them to live in the canton but not to work. Over the course of the war, Switzerland interned 300,000 refugees. Of these, 104,000 were foreign troops interned according to the Rights and Duties of Neutral Powers outlined in the Hague Conventions. The rest were foreign civilians and were either interned or granted tolerance or residence permits by the cantonal authorities. Refugees were not allowed to hold jobs. Of the refugees, 60,000 were civilians escaping persecution by the Nazis. Of these 60,000, 27,000 were Jews. The official Swiss narrative on this subject was largely focused on Switzerland's generosity and tolerance, while refugees were portrayed as a burden. This attitude can clearly be seen in an article by Ella Maillart for the “Weekly” magazine in London, 1938. Between 10,000 and 24,000 Jewish civilian refugees were refused entry. These refugees were refused entry on the claim of 'dwindling supplies'. Of those refused entry, a Swiss government representative said, "Our little lifeboat is full." At the beginning of the war, Switzerland had a Jewish population of between 18,000 and 28,000 and a total population of about 4 million. By the end of the war, there were over 115,000 refuge-seeking people of all categories in Switzerland, representing the maximum number of refugees at any one time.

A refugee help network operated from the Polish embassy in Bern; the Ładoś Group. This initiative saved thousands of Jews from certain death by issuing them with Latin American identity papers. Not all efforts were successful though, and the network was eventually discovered and dismantled by the Swiss authorities.

Switzerland's treatment of Jewish refugees has been criticized by scholars of the Holocaust. In 1999 an international panel of historians declared that Switzerland was "guilty of acting as an accomplice to the Holocaust when it refused to accept many thousands of fleeing Jews, and instead sent them back to almost certain annihilation at the hands of the Nazis".

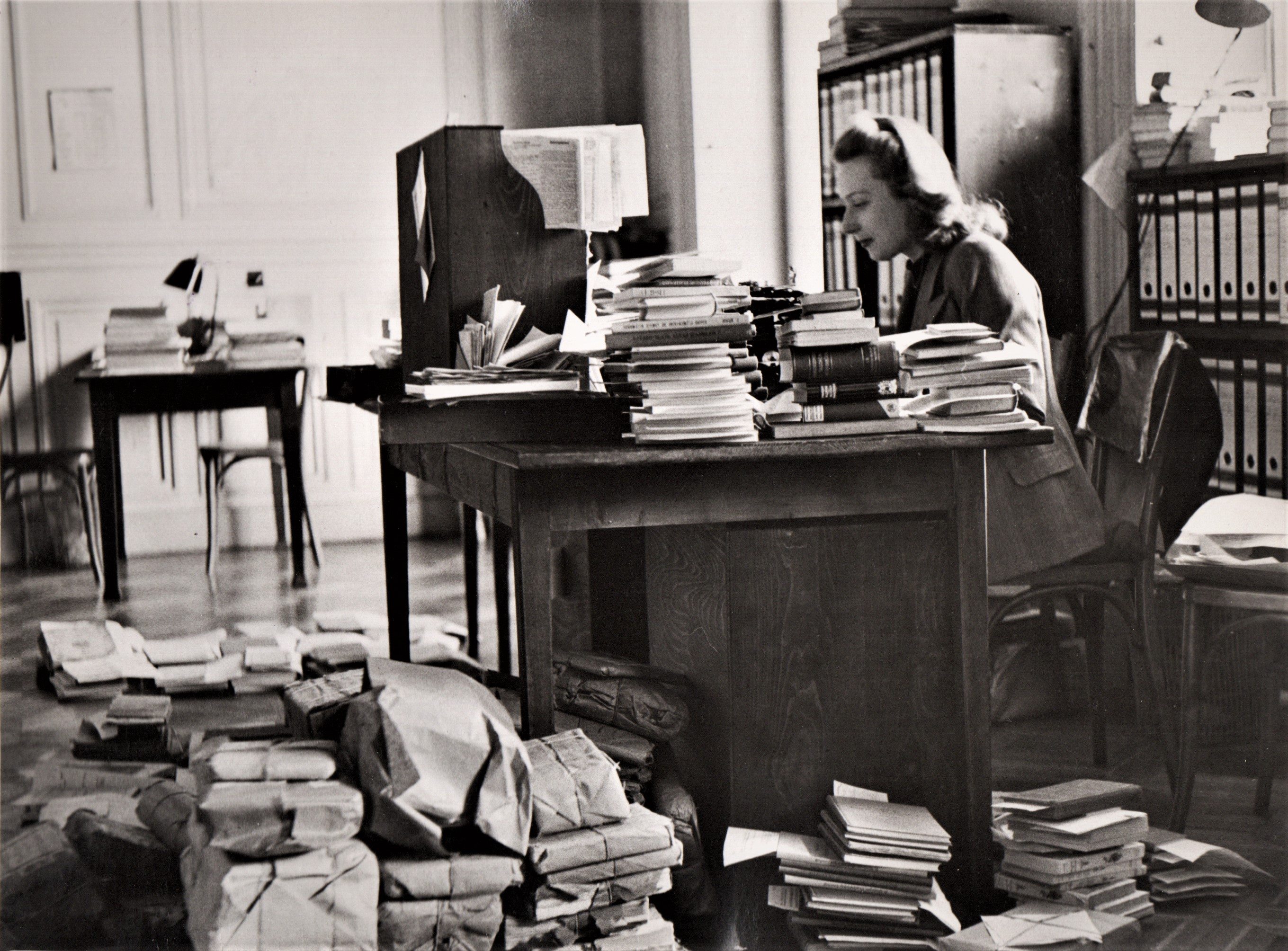
A photograph from the International Bureau of Education Archives showing the preparation of parcels and books for distribution to prisoners of war.

Switzerland also acted as a refuge for Allied prisoners of war who escaped, including those from Oflag IV-C (Colditz).

=== Protecting Power mandates ===
In war time each belligerent nation relies on an independent neutral third party to protect its diplomatic interests through "mandates" as specified in international law especially the Hague Conventions of 1899 and 1907. In World War II, Switzerland, and to a lesser extent Sweden and the US, performed these roles for both sides. When the US entered the war in late 1941, Switzerland took over its mandates. In terms of major roles Swiss diplomats had the mandate to protect Germany's interest in Britain, the US, Yugoslavia, Turkey, and Dutch Indonesia. Switzerland protected British interests in Germany, France, Italy, Hungary, Romania and Japan. It protected Vichy France's interests in Britain, the US, Italy, Egypt and Brazil. It protected Italy's interest in Egypt and Brazil. It protected the US interest in Germany, France, Italy, Japan, China and Denmark. It protected Japan's interest in Britain, the US, Egypt and Argentina. The diplomats arranged travel permissions, helping tens of thousands of people to return to their home countries after being trapped in an enemy nation. Swiss diplomats also supervised closed enemy embassies. Of special importance was the protection provided prisoners of war, especially the sick and wounded.

=== Service of Intellectual Assistance to Prisoners of War (SIAP) ===
In 1939, the Service of Intellectual Assistance to Prisoners of War (SIAP) was created by the International Bureau of Education (IBE), a Geneva-based international organization dedicated to educational matters. In collaboration with the Swiss Federal Council, who initially funded the project, and the International Committee of the Red Cross (ICRC), the SIAP provided over half a million books to prisoners of war during World War II, and organized educational opportunities and study groups in prison camps.

=== Medical Mission To The Eastern Front ===
Swiss Medical Mission
- Schweizerische Medizinische Mission
- Active: 15 October 1941 – Early 1944
- Country: Switzerland
- Allegiance: Germany
- Type: Medical Mission
- Size: 200 Doctors, nurses, surgeons, and writers
- Engagements: Eastern Front; First Battle of Smolensk; Soviet Partisan Activities

Despite official neutrality, in 1941, the first of four medical missions led by Dr. Alfred Sander of the National Movement was sent by train to the Eastern front to provide humanitarian aid to the Wehrmacht on the Eastern Front. Originally the proposal for such forces was rejected by the Swiss federal government, but with the help of the right wing politician, Eugen Bircher, the mission was approved. The Swiss army saw this as an opportunity to test new medical practices in warzones, including the new blood transfusion.

Swiss personnel were documented for providing surgeries and amputations for German soldiers during the First Battle of Smolensk. Most of these amputations were done without anesthetics, which led to many deaths of the wounded German soldiers, which the experiences haunted many volunteers. During the second military mission, personnel were given camouflaged Swiss trucks to use as ambulances. Throughout all four missions, Swiss personnel operated in German occupied Russia, Ukraine, Poland, and Baltic States.

During the medical mission throughout all of the German occupied East, some Swiss personnel would provide humanitarian assistance to Jewish and Soviet prisoners of war, while other personnel would hand Jews to the German authorities, but most would stand by and just document the atrocities without attempting to stop them. Many of those doctors felt ashamed that they were unable to step in to further prevent atrocities committed by the Germans, including Dr. Rintelen, who was sent home after a mental break down. At one point, nurses from the military mission were sent to the Warsaw Ghetto and inspected a makeshift cemetery within the ghetto.

In 1944, Swiss personnel narrowly withdrew from the Eastern front after successful Soviet offensives in Stalingrad. During and after the war, Swiss authorities and former members of the mission tried to bury any evidence of their participation, including evidence of their knowledge of the Holocaust. While originally out of fear of the possible Nazi invasion, Operation Tannenbaum, if they were uncooperative, was later to deny any involvement that would have broke their neutrality declarations. Despite this, many doctors still spoke out on the atrocities they witnessed.

== Financial relationships with Nazi Germany ==
Switzerland's trade was blockaded by both the Allies and by the Axis. Each side openly exerted pressure on Switzerland not to trade with the other. Economic cooperation and extension of credit to Germany varied according to the perceived likelihood of invasion, and the availability of other trading partners. Concessions reached their zenith after a crucial rail link through Vichy France was severed in 1942, leaving Switzerland completely surrounded by the Axis. Switzerland relied on trade for half of its food and essentially all of its fuel; however, the Swiss controlled vital trans-alpine rail tunnels between Germany and Italy and possessed considerable electrical generating capacity that was relatively safe from air attack. Switzerland's most important exports during the war were precision machine tools, watches, jewel bearings (used in bomb sights), electricity, and dairy products. Until 1936, the Swiss franc was the only remaining major freely convertible currency in the world, and both the Allies and the Germans sold large amounts of gold to the Swiss National Bank. Between 1940 and 1945, the German Reichsbank sold 1.3 billion francs (approximately 18 billion francs adjusted for inflation to 2019) worth of gold to Swiss banks in exchange for Swiss francs and other foreign currency, which were used to buy strategically important raw materials like tungsten and oil from neutral countries. Hundreds of millions of francs' worth of this gold was monetary gold plundered from the central banks of occupied countries. A total of 581,000 francs' worth of "Melmer" gold taken from Holocaust victims in eastern Europe was sold to Swiss banks.

Swiss National Bank gold transactions from 1 September 1939 to 30 June 1945 (in CHF millions) (Note: Purchases and sales made by the Swiss National Bank to the listed counterparty.)
Party	Purchases	Sales	Net
USA	2242.9	714.3	1528.7
Great Britain	668.6	0	668.6
Canada	65.3	0	65.3
Germany	1231.1	19.5	1211.6
Italy	150.1	0	150.1
Japan	0	5	−5.0
Portugal	85.1	536.6	−451.5
Spain	0	185.1	−185.1
Romania	9.8	112.1	−102.3
Hungary	0	16.3	−16.3
Slovakia	0	11.3	−11.3
Turkey	0	14.8	−14.8
Argentina	32.7	0	32.7
France	193.2	0	193.2
Greece	0.5	0	0.5
Sweden	77.5	3	74.5
BIS	61.5	18.3	43.2
Market	71.6	667.8	−596.2
Confederation	269.3	1087.9	−818.6
Federal Mint	42.5	45.8	−3.3

In the 1990s, a controversy over a class-action lawsuit brought in Brooklyn, New York, over Jewish assets in Holocaust-era bank accounts prompted the Swiss government to commission the most recent and authoritative study of Switzerland's interaction with the Nazi regime. The final report by this independent panel of international scholars, known as the Bergier Commission, was issued in 2002 and also documented Switzerland's role as a major hub for the sale and transfer of Nazi-looted art during the Second World War.

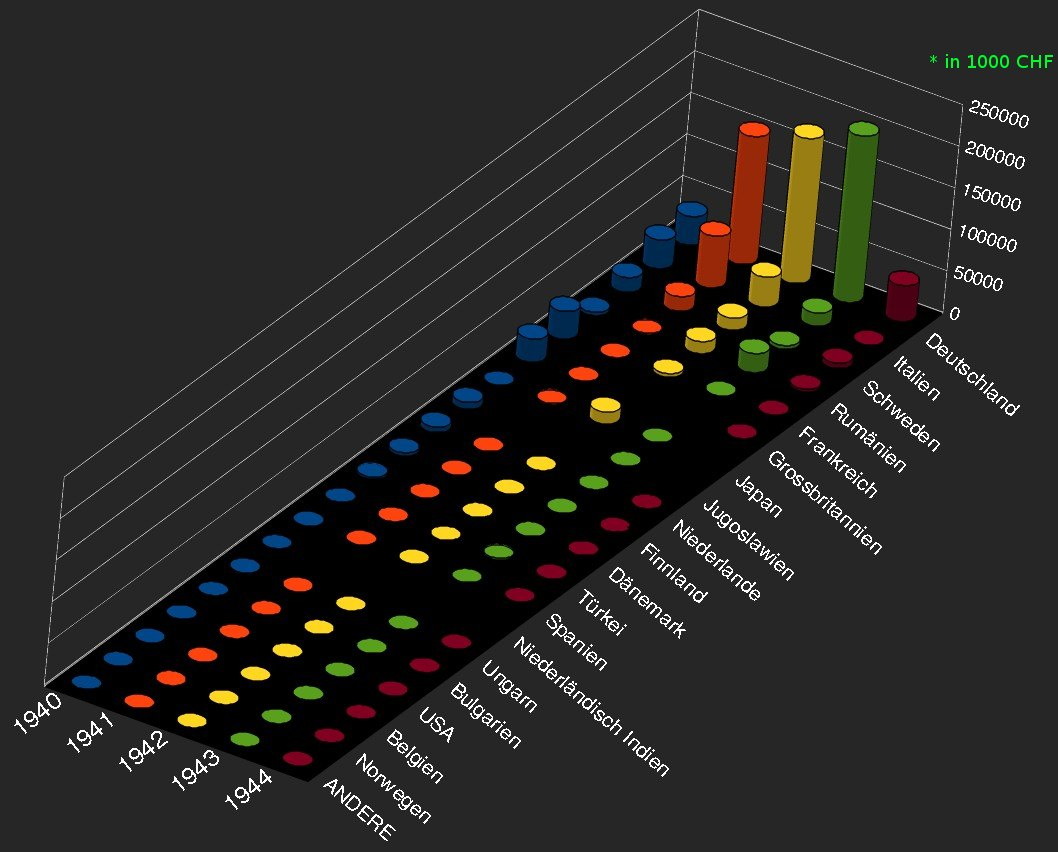
Swiss exports of arms, ammunition, and fuses (thousands of CHF) 1940–1944

Under pressure from the Allies, in December 1943 quotas were imposed on the importation and exportation of certain goods and foodstuffs and in October 1944 sales of munitions were halted. However, the transit of goods by railway between Germany, Italy and occupied France continued. North–South transit trade across Switzerland increased from 2.5 million tons before the war to nearly 6 million tons per year. No troops or "war goods" were supposed to be transshipped. Switzerland was concerned that Germany would cease the supply of the coal it required if it blocked coal shipments to Italy while the Allies, despite some plans to do so, took no action as they wanted to maintain good relations with Switzerland. Between 1939 and 1945 Germany exported 10,267,000 tons of coal to Switzerland. In 1943 these imports supplied 41% of Swiss energy requirements. In the same period Switzerland sold electric power to Germany equivalent to 6,077,000 tons of coal.

== See also ==
- List of World War II weapons of Switzerland
- List of aircraft of Switzerland in World War II
- Neutral powers during World War II
- Switzerland in the First World War (in German)
- Switzerland during the First World War (in French)
