= M36 =

M36, M-36 or M.36 may refer to:

== Military ==
- HMS Bicester (M36), a Royal Navy mine countermeasures vessel
- M36 tank destroyer, a World War II and Korean War US Army tank destroyer
- M89SR sniper rifle, first introduced as the Sardius M36 Sniper Weapon System in the 1980s
- Bofors M36, an anti-aircraft autocannon
- Bulgarian M36 helmet, of the Bulgarian Army prior to and during World War II
- Panssarimiina m/36, a Finnish anti-tank mine
- Skoda 75 mm Model 1936 (75 mm M.36), a mountain artillery gun
- M36, a variant of the US Army M35 series 2½-ton 6×6 cargo truck
- M36, the engine for the Leichttraktor, a German 1930s experimental tank
- M36 Burster, a warhead of the US Army M55 rocket
- M36 Captive Flight Training Missile, used for training on the handling of the AGM-114 Hellfire
- Modell 1936, a German World War II uniform
- M36 Patrol Boat, Royal Thai navy patrol boat

== Transportation ==
Airports and train stations

- Frank Federer Memorial Airport, see List of airports in Arkansas
- Jigozen Station, in Jigozen, Hatsukaichi, Hiroshima, Japan
- Muroran Station, in Muroran, Hokkaido, Japan

Roads

- M-36 (Michigan highway), a state highway
- M36 (Cape Town), a Metropolitan Route in Cape Town, South Africa
- M36 (Johannesburg), a Metropolitan Route in Johannesburg, South Africa
- M36 (Pretoria), a Metropolitan Route in Pretoria, South Africa
- M36 Highway (Kazakhstan), part of AH7 (Asian Highway 7)

Vehicles

- ICAR M.36 Comercial, a Willy Messerschmitt-designed airliner, of which one was built in the 1930s
- New South Wales M36 class locomotive
- Progress M-36, a Russian spacecraft

== Medicine and science ==
- Messier 36, an open star cluster in the constellation Auriga
- M36, a sub-strain of the Vollum strain of the anthrax bacterium
- M36, a subclade of Haplogroup M (mtDNA)

== Other uses ==
- British NVC community M36, a mire community; see Mires in the British National Vegetation Classification system
- Samsung Galaxy M36 5G, a mid-range Android-based smartphone
- Symphony No. 3 (Szymanowski), M36 in the Michałowski catalogue
- M36, an Egyptian hieroglyph; see List of Egyptian hieroglyphs § M36
- M36, a metric screw thread standardised in ISO 965

== See also ==
- 36M, a variant of the British Mills bomb hand grenade
