= List of World War II uniforms and clothing =

This is a list of uniforms and clothing associated with World War II.

== Helmets and hats ==
=== Allied ===
- Adrian helmet and mamadou cap
- Beret
- Balmoral bonnet
- Brodie helmet
- Campaign hat
- Cap comforter
- Caubeen
- Fez
- Field Service Cap
- Garrison cap
- General Service Cap
- Glengarry
- Hełm wz. 31
- Helmet Steel Airborne Troop
- Jeep cap
- Kepi
- M1 helmet
- M1C helmet
- M2 helmet
- M38 Tanker helmet
- Mk III helmet
- Papakhi
- Patrol cap
- Peaked cap
- Pith helmet
- RAC helmet
- Rogatywka
- Sailor cap
- Slouch hat
- Soviet helmets during World War II
- Stahlhelm (Used by the National Revolutionary Army)
- Tam o' Shanter
- Tent cap
- Turban
- Type B Helmet
- Ushanka
- Utility cover

=== Axis ===
- Beret
- Bulgarian M36 Helmet
- Fez
- Hachimaki
- Kepi (Worn by Vichy French soldiers)
- M33 helmet
- M43 field cap
- Pith helmet
- Sailor cap
- Stahlhelm
- Tally
- Turban

== Uniform clothing ==
- Battle Dress
- Breeches
- Denison smock
- Eisenhower jacket
- Epaulette
- Gaiters
- Gorget
- Greatcoat
- Gymnasterka
- Jumpsuit
- Kilt
- Knochensack
- Leggings
- M1941 field jacket
- M42 jacket
- Poncho
- Puttee
- Sam Browne belt
- Senninbari
- Shirt
- Shoulder strap
- Smock
- Telnyashka
- Telogreika
- Trench coat
- Trews
- Trousers
- U.S. Army M-1943 uniform

== Footwear ==
- Ammunition boots
- Combat boots
- Jump boots
- Jungle boots
- Sandals
- Officer riding boots

== Uniform equipment ==
- Pattern 1897 infantry officer's sword
- 1908 pattern webbing
- 1937 pattern web equipment
- Bandolier
- Battle Jerkin
- Bayonet
- Coast Guard Officers' Sword
- Degen
- Dirk
- Entrenching tool
- Gas mask
- Haversack
- Kukri
- Mameluke sword
- Marine non-commissioned officers' sword, 1859-present
- Szabla

== Patches, badges, and insignia ==
- Army ranks of the Japanese Empire during World War II
- Naval ranks of the Japanese Empire during World War II
- United States Army enlisted rank insignia of World War II military police arm bands

== See also ==
- Comparative military ranks of World War II
- List of equipment used in World War II
- Imperial Japanese Army Uniforms
- United States Army Uniform in World War II
- Ranks and insignia of the Red Army and Navy 1940–1943
- Ranks and insignia of the Soviet Armed Forces 1943–1955

=== Uniforms and insignia of Nazi Germany ===
- Uniforms of the German Army (1935–1945)
  - Ranks and insignia of the German Army (1935–1945)
- Uniforms of the Luftwaffe (1935–1945)
    - Ranks and insignia of the Luftwaffe (1935–1945)
- Uniforms and insignia of the Kriegsmarine
  - Awards and decorations of the Kriegsmarine
- Nazi party paramilitary ranks
  - Ranks and insignia of the Nazi Party
  - Ranks and insignia of the Sturmabteilung
  - Uniforms and insignia of the Schutzstaffel
- Ranks and insignia of the Ordnungspolizei
- Comparative ranks of Nazi Germany
- Orders, decorations, and medals of Nazi Germany
