= Ajina Station =

Railway station in Hatsukaichi, Hiroshima Prefecture, Japan

Ajina Station 阿品駅
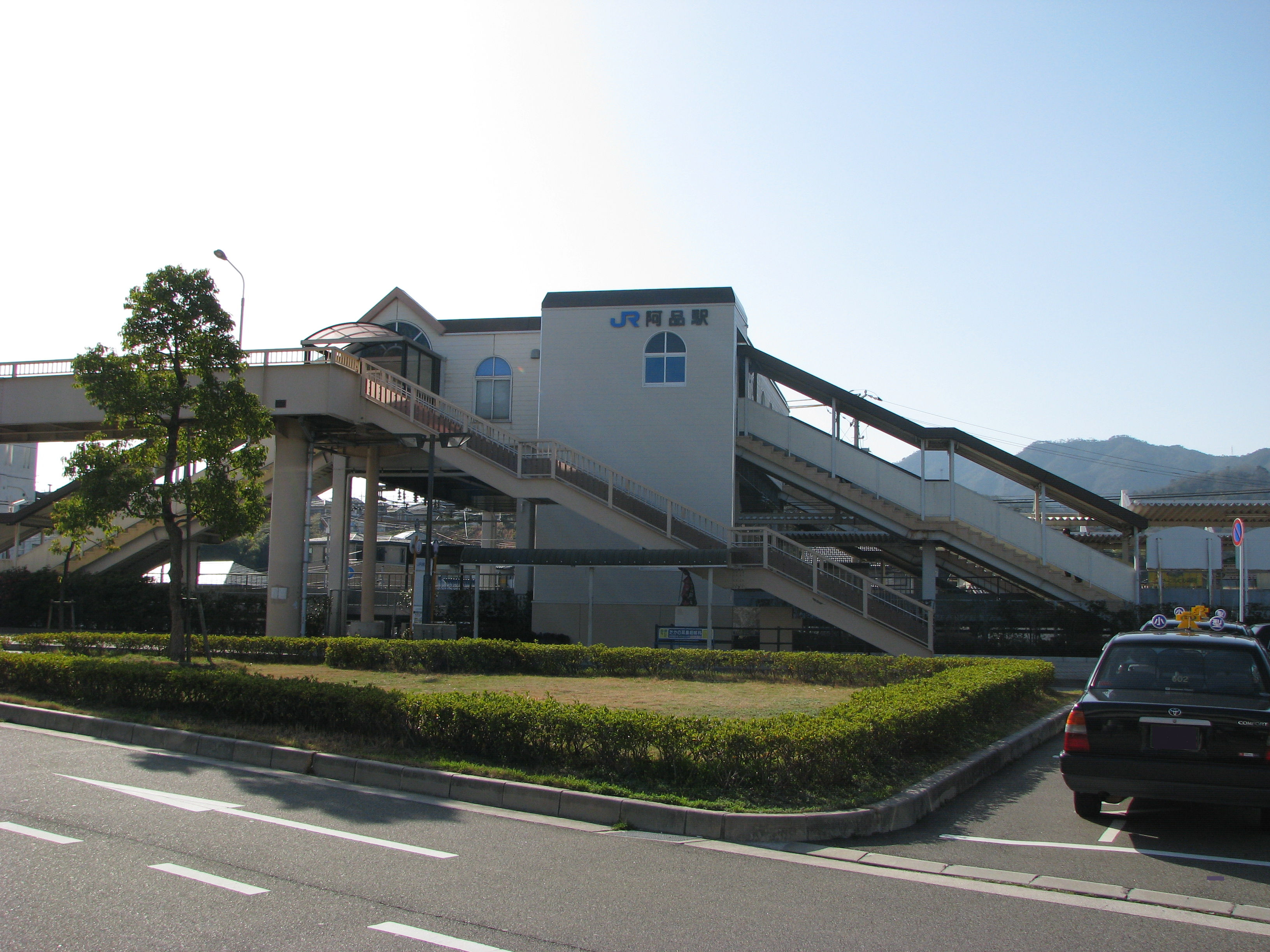
- Ajina Station in March 2008

General information
- Location: 2-chōme-29 Ajina, Hatsukaichi-shi, Hiroshima-ken 738-0054; Japan
- Coordinates: 34°19′23.1″N 132°18′51.48″E
- Owner: West Japan Railway Company
- Operator: West Japan Railway Company
- Line: R Sanyō Main Line
- Distance: 324.8 km (201.8 miles) from Kobe
- Platforms: 2 side platforms
- Tracks: 2
- Connections: Bus stop

Construction
- Accessible: Yes

Other information
- Status: Staffed
- Station code: JR-R09
- Website: Official website

History
- Opened: 11 August 1989

Passengers
- FY2019: 2250

Services
| Preceding station | JR West | Following station |
|---|---|---|
| Miyajimaguchi towards Iwakuni | San'yō Line Local | Miyauchi-Kushido towards Hiroshima |
Location
- Location within Hiroshima Prefecture Location within Japan

Ajina Station (阿品駅, Ajina-eki) is a passenger railway station located in the city of Hatsukaichi, Hiroshima Prefecture, Japan. It is operated by the West Japan Railway Company (JR West).

== Lines ==
Ajina Station is served by the JR West Sanyō Main Line, and is located 324.8 kilometers from the terminus of the line at Kobe.

== Station layout ==
The station consists of two opposed side platforms connected by an elevated station building. The station is staffed.

== Platforms ==
| 1 | ■ R Sanyō Main Line | for Hiroshima and Kure |
| 2 | ■ R Sanyō Main Line | for Miyajimaguchi and Iwakuni |

== History ==
Ajina Station was opened on 11 August 1989.

== Passenger statistics ==
In fiscal 2019, the station was used by an average of 2250 passengers daily.

== Surrounding area ==
- Japan National Route 2
- JR Ajina Station is directly connected to Hiroden-ajina Station by an overpass.

=== Hiroden ===
█ Miyajima Line
Line #2

Ajina-higashi — Hiroden-ajina — Hiroden-miyajima-guchi

== See also ==
- List of railway stations in Japan
