= Awards and decorations of the Kriegsmarine =

Awards and decorations of the Kriegsmarine consisted of a series of war badges as well as a series of naval combat clasps; these awards were considered part of a larger array of Third Reich military decorations.

The following were the primary naval war badges awarded for service in various branches of the Kriegsmarine.

High Seas Fleet Badge	Destroyer War Badge	Minesweeper War Badge	Blockade Runner Badge

E-Boat War Badge	U-Boat War Badge	Auxiliary Cruiser Badge	Naval Artillery War Badge

In addition to war badges, naval personnel could also qualify for follow-on combat clasps. Such clasps were smaller in design and always awarded after receipt of a primary war badge (thus, it was not possible to gain a combat clasp without having a war badge first). The combat clasps were the:

U-Boat Combat Clasp (Gold, Silver, Bronze)	Naval Front Clasp	Small Battle Unit Combat Clasp (1st to 7th Grade)

Naval badges could further be upgraded to include an award with diamonds, although this stipulation was only for the primary war badges with combat clasps issued in a single degree only. On paper, every naval war badge could receive a diamonds upgrade, but in reality because of the strain of the war and the German High Commands disregard for the navy only the U-Boat Badge, E-Boat Badge, Minesweeper Badge and Auxiliary Cruiser Badge were awarded in diamonds. The breakdown was as follows:

- U-Boat War Badge with diamonds: Approximately thirty were awarded. A "special grade" was issued to Admiral Karl Dönitz which was basically a standard U-Boat badge with diamonds; however it was hand crafted and considered much more valuable than the standard design.
- Destroyer War Badge with diamonds: A single example of this badge was manufactured but it was never awarded. Records of this decoration indicate that the award was to be highly selective and only issued to a handful of destroyer captains upon Germany's ultimate victory in the Second World War.
- Minesweeper War Badge with diamonds: Records indicate that this badge was only awarded once, although to whom is still a matter of question since exact records were lost at the end of World War II.
- E-Boat War Badge with diamonds: Only eight of these awards were ever made, all of which were presented to Schnellboot commanders who had received the Knight's Cross with Oak Leaves.
- High Seas Fleet Badge with diamonds: This award was never bestowed, although a handful were manufactured. The criteria for the award was to serve as the commander of a German heavy cruiser and battleship and also be awarded the Knight's Cross with Oak Leaves. During the Second World War, no "big ship" officer of the Kriegsmarine ever qualified, made difficult no doubt by Adolf Hitler's general dislike for the German surface fleet in favor of small escort boats and submarines.
- Auxiliary Cruiser Badge with diamonds: Only two awards were ever made, to Captains Helmuth von Ruckteschell of the German Auxiliary Cruiser Michel, and to Ernst-Felix Krüder of the cruiser Pinguin.
- Blockade Runner Badge with diamonds: This award existed only on paper and was never produced or awarded nor were firm criteria ever established for the circumstances under which it could be awarded.
- Naval Artillery War Badge with diamonds: Records of the Kriegsmarine indicate that the existence of this badge with diamonds was only casually discussed and nothing was ever put down seriously about its creation.

== Establishment dates ==
- High Seas Fleet Badge (established April 1941)
- Destroyer War Badge (established 4 June 1940)
- Minesweeper War Badge (established 31 August 1940)
- Blockade Runner Badge (established 1 April 1941)
- Fast Attack Craft War Badge (established 30 May 1941)
- U-Boat War Badge (established 13 October 1939)
- Auxiliary Cruiser Badge (established 24 April 1941)
- Naval Artillery War Badge (established 24 June 1941)
- U-Boat Combat Clasp (established 15 May 1944)
- Naval Front Clasp (established 19 November 1944)
- Small Battle Unit Combat Clasp (established 15 December 1944)
