= Yugoslav military equipment of World War II =

This is a list of Yugoslav military equipment of World War II. This will deal with the equipment of the military of the Kingdom of Yugoslavia and not the various resistance groups active in the country during World War II. This is because these resistance groups are distinct from the Yugoslav military and used a variety of weapons that not fit in with those used by the Yugoslav armed forces.

== Land weapons ==
- List of World War II weapons of Yugoslavia

== Aircraft ==
- List of aircraft of Yugoslavia in World War II
