= Hiroden-ajina Station =

Streetcar station in Hiroshima

Coordinates: 34°19′18.74″N 132°18′53.29″E

Hiroden-ajina 広電阿品
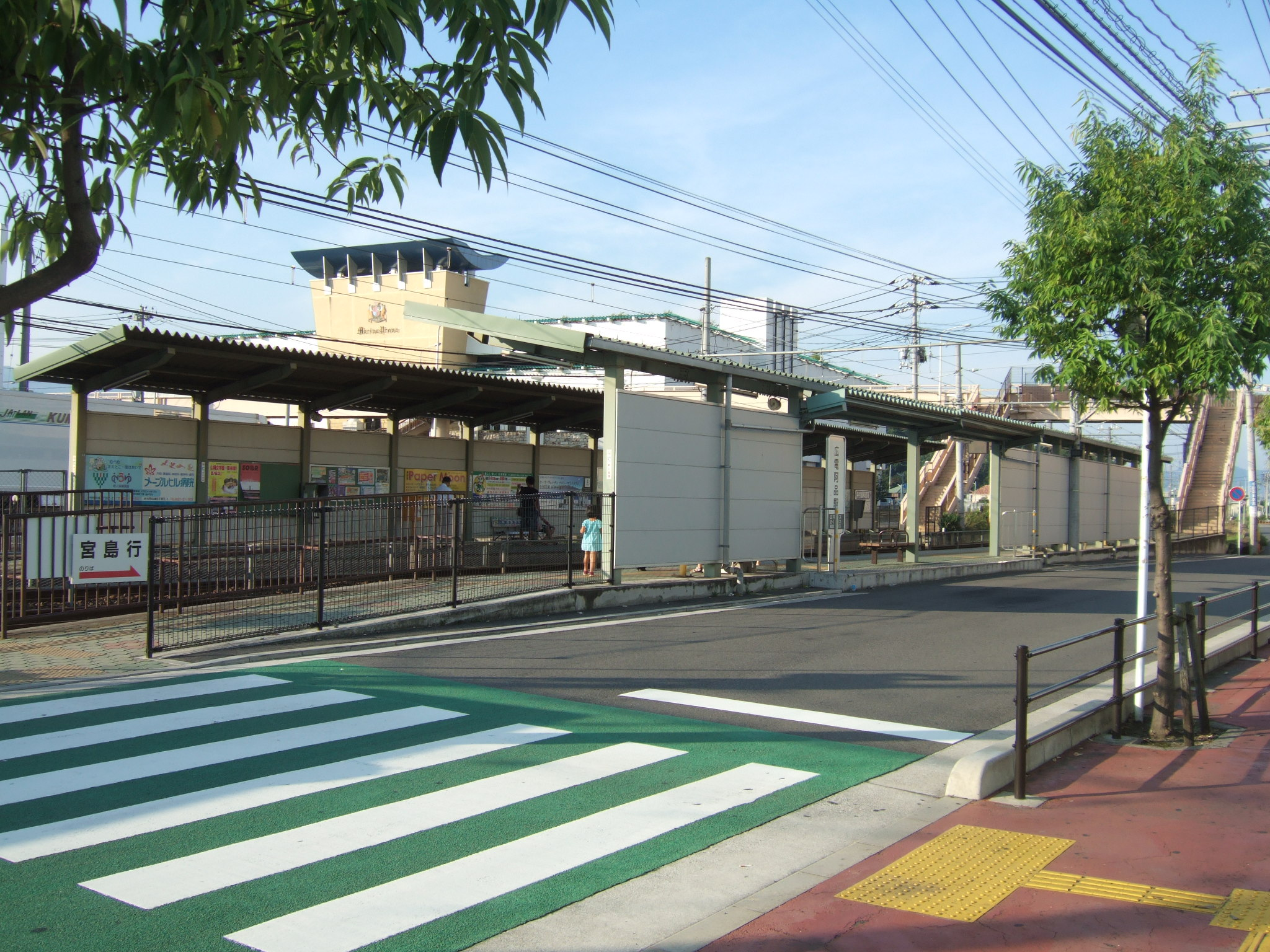

General information
- Location: 3-2533-3, Ajina, Hatsukaichi, Hiroshima; Japan
- Operator: Hiroshima Electric Railway
- Lines: Hiroden █ Miyajima Line; Route
- Connections: █ Sanyo Main Line at Ajina Station

Other information
- Station code: M38

History
- Opened: August 1, 1978
Location

Hiroden-ajina is a Hiroden station on Hiroden Miyajima Line, located in Ajina, Hatsukaichi, Hiroshima.

== Routes ==
From Hiroden-ajina Station, there is one of Hiroden Streetcar routes.

- Hiroshima Station - Hiroden-miyajima-guchi Route

== Connections ==
█ Miyajima Line

Ajina-higashi — Hiroden-ajina — Hiroden-miyajima-guchi

== Other services connections ==
=== JR lines ===
- JR lines connections at JR Ajina Station

JR Ajina Station is directly connected from Hiroden-ajina Station by the overpass.

== Around station ==
- JR Ajina Station

== History ==
- Opened as "Tajiri" on August 1, 1978.
- Renamed to "Hiroden-ajina" on November 1, 2001.

== See also ==
- Hiroden lines and routes
