= List of Spanish military equipment of World War II =

This is a list of Spanish military equipment of World War II. While Spain was neutral during the Second World War they had axis sympathies due to Nazi Germany and Fascist Italy helping them win the civil war. These lists will not deal with equipment of Spanish volunteers fighting in the Wehrmacht.

== Weapons ==
- List of World War II weapons of Spain

== Aircraft ==
- List of aircraft of Spain in World War II
