= List of Finnish military equipment of World War II =

This is a list of military equipment used by Finland during World War II. The main Finnish conflicts of the war are the Winter War and Continuation War. After the Continuation war the Lapland War occurred which was a small military confrontation between Finland and Nazi Germany caused by Soviet demands that Finland force out Nazi Germany from its territory in order for Finland to comply with the peace treaty they signed with the Soviets.

== Weapons ==
- List of World War II weapons of Finland

== Aircraft ==
- List of aircraft of Finland in World War II
