= Ajina-higashi Station =

Railway station in Hatsukaichi, Hiroshima prefecture, Japan

Ajina-higashi Station 阿品東
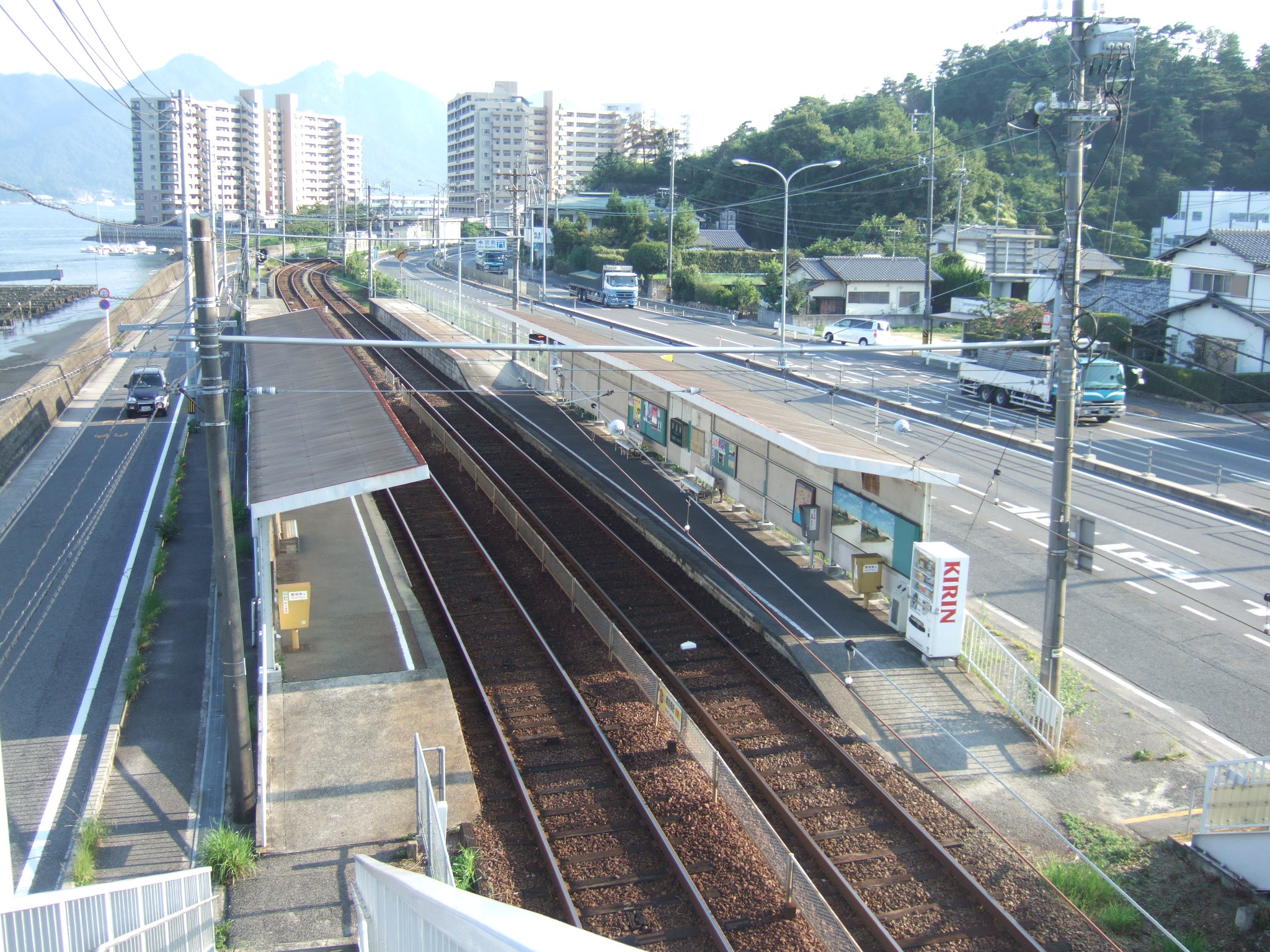

General information
- Location: 1-2070-11, Ajina, Hatsukaichi, Hiroshima; Japan
- Coordinates: 34°19′36.61″N 132°19′6.56″E
- Operator: Hiroshima Electric Railway
- Lines: Hiroden █ Miyajima Line; Route

Other information
- Station code: M37

History
- Opened: February 15, 1931
Location

Ajina-higashi is a Hiroden station on Hiroden Miyajima Line, located in Ajina, Hatsukaichi, Hiroshima.

== Routes ==
From Ajina-higashi Station, there is one of Hiroden Streetcar routes.

- Hiroshima Station - Hiroden-miyajima-guchi Route

== Connections ==
█ Miyajima Line

Jigozen — Ajina-higashi — Hiroden-ajina

== History ==
- Opened as "Ajina" on February 15, 1931.
- Renamed to "Jigozen-Kenbyouin-mae" on January 1, 1954.
- Renamed to "Ajina" when the hospital closed on March 1, 1972.
- Renamed to "Ajina-higashi on November 1, 2001.

== See also ==
- Hiroden lines and routes
