= Eugen Bircher =

Swiss politician and military leader

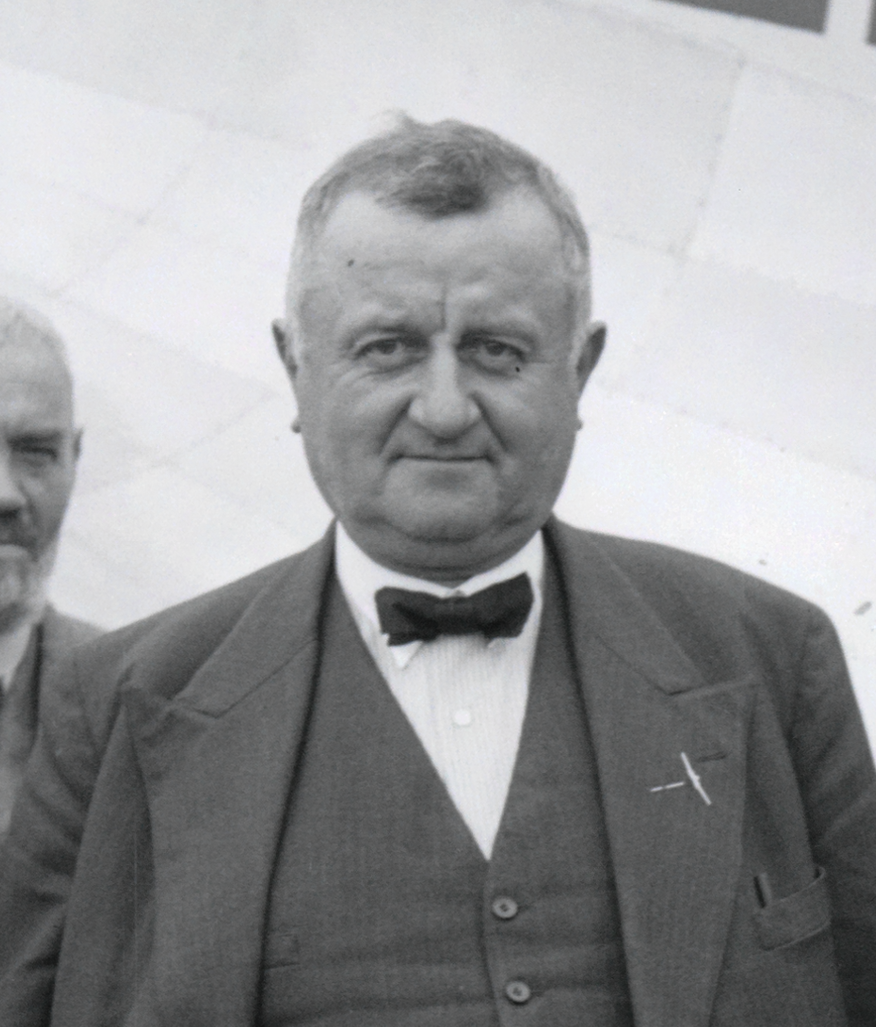
- Bircher in 1935
- Born: Eugen Bircher; 17 February 1882; Aarau, Switzerland
- Died: 20 October 1956 (aged 74); Zurich, Switzerland
- Citizenship: Swiss
- Occupation: Physician
- Known for: Army officer, politician
- Political party: Party of Farmers, Traders and Independents, Schweizerischer Vaterländischer Verband

Eugen Bircher (17 February 1882 – 20 October 1956) was a Swiss politician and military leader who became associated with a pro-German position in the inter-war years.

== Military and political career ==
Bircher came to prominence in the army where he rose to the rank of colonel. In 1934 he was promoted to Major General (Commander of 4., later 5. Division). Together with Federal Counselor Rudolf Minger he was a leading promoter of Swiss armament and preparedness between 1934 and 1939. Bircher published a lot of medical, political and military books and articles.

An opponent of immigration, in 1919 he formed the Schweizerischer Vaterländischer Verband, SVV (Swiss Fatherland Association), a militia and semi-secret society with links to fascist groups abroad. The group became influential amongst army officers in the years following the First World War. Bircher's position as leader of SVV was boosted by his spells as president of the Swiss Officers Society (1931-7) and editor of the official Swiss Army newspaper (1934–42). An influential figure in society, Bircher numbered the federal councillors Marcel Pilet-Golaz, Giuseppe Motta, Eduard von Steiger, Philipp Etter, Walther Stampfli and Ernst Wetter amongst his close political associates.

Bircher sought a close relationship between Switzerland and Nazi Germany, and it has even been alleged that he funded Adolf Hitler in his early years (although no conclusive evidence has as yet been provided and his biographer rejects this claim outright). He also organized medical corps for the Eastern Front on the pretext of anti-communism.

== Medical career ==
Bircher was a physician (Chief Surgeon 1917–1932, Director 1932–34 of Kantonsspital Aarau) by trade and in the 1920s published several groundbreaking papers detailing arthroscopy procedures on the knee. Bircher is often considered the inventor of arthroscopy of the knee, although the Japanese surgeon Masaki Watanabe receives primary credit for using arthroscopy for interventional surgery. After diagnosing torn tissue through arthroscopy, Bircher used open surgery to remove or repair the damaged tissue. Initially, he used an electric Jacobaeus thoracolaparoscope for his diagnostic procedures, but later became devoted to double-contrast radiography for diagnostics. Bircher gave up endoscopy in 1930, and his work was largely neglected for several decades.

Bircher was opposed to the introduction of iodised salt, recommended by the Goitre Commission in 1922, of which he was a member. Bircher remained opposed to it until the end of his life. His home canton, Aargau, still largely suffered from iodine deficiency and goitre, meanwhile most of the Switzerland has seen significant progress since the introduction of iodine treatment.

== Sources ==
Daniel Heller, Eugen Bircher, Arzt, Militär, Politiker, NZZ Zürich (1988).
