= Jigozen Station =

Railway station in Hatsukaichi, Hiroshima prefecture, Japan

Coordinates: 34.3408°N 132.3201°E

Jigozen 地御前
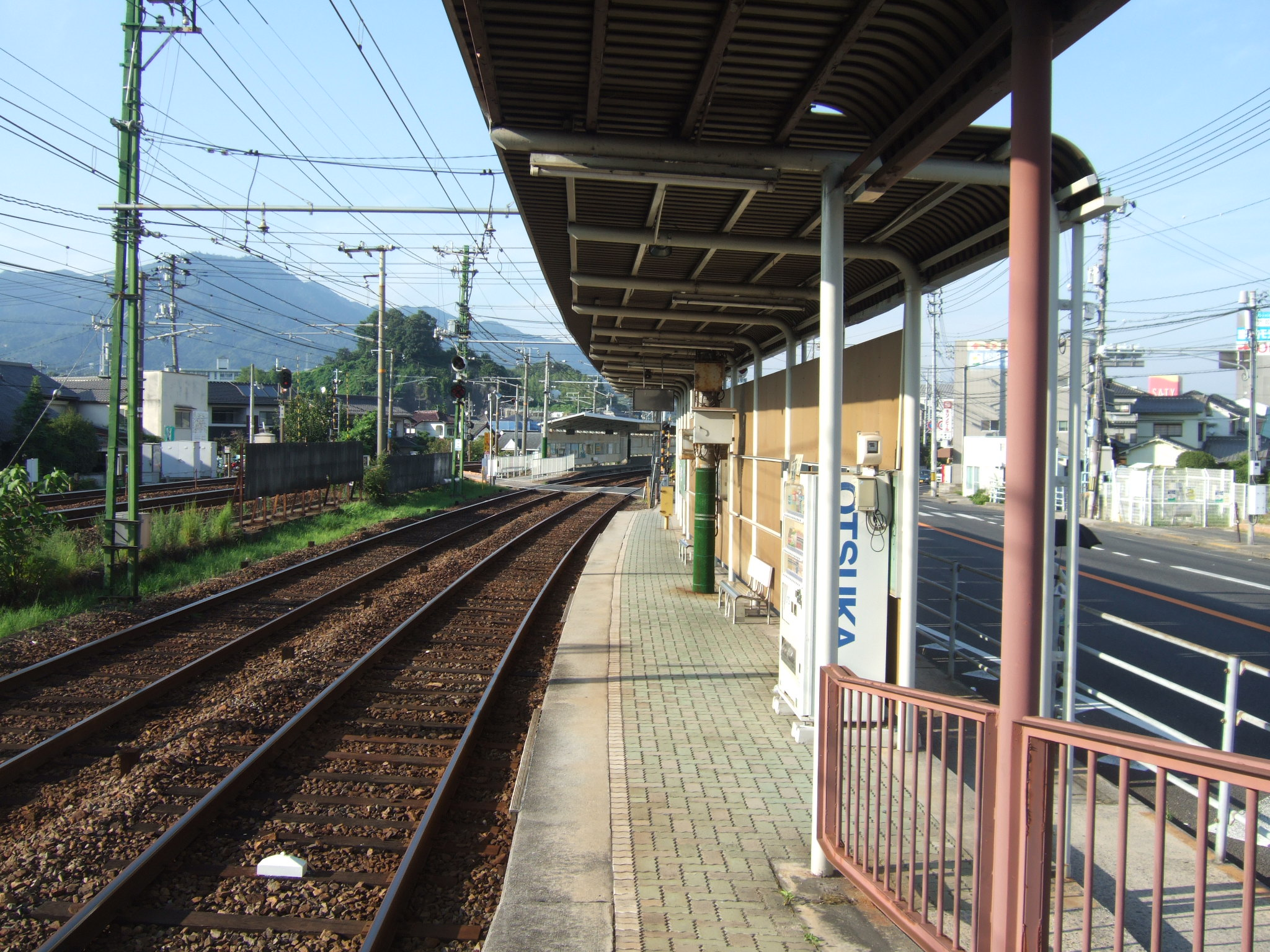

General information
- Location: 5-2579-2, Jigozen, Hatsukaichi, Hiroshima; Japan
- Operator: Hiroshima Electric Railway
- Lines: Hiroden █ Miyajima Line; Route

Other information
- Station code: M36

History
- Opened: July 15, 1925
Location

Jigozen (or Zigozen) is a Hiroden station on Hiroden Miyajima Line, located in Jigozen, Hatsukaichi, Hiroshima.

== Routes ==
From Jigozen Station, there is one of Hiroden Streetcar routes.

- Hiroshima Station - Hiroden-miyajima-guchi Route

== Connections ==
█ Miyajima Line

JA Hiroshimabyoin-mae — Jigozen — Ajina-higashi

== Around station ==
- Jigozen Fishing Port
- Jigozen Shrine - the position of Mōri clan for Battle of Miyajima

== History ==
- Opened on July 15, 1925.

== See also ==
- Hiroden lines and routes
