= List of World War II weapons of Portugal =

This is a list of weapons used by the Portuguese military during World War II. Portugal remained neutral until 1944 when it cooperated with the Allies as a non-belligerent. However the leader of Portugal during World War II as well as during the Spanish civil war António de Oliveira Salazar said at the outbreak of World War II that the 550 year old Anglo-Portuguese Alliance was still intact and that Portugal would come to Britain's aid if they requested it but as they did not they would remain neutral. The alliance most likely meant that Portugal while being neutral until 1944 was from the beginning of the war in favour of the Allies.

== Small arms ==
=== Rifles ===
- Mauser Karabiner 98k
- Mauser–Vergueiro m/1904-39 locally designed from Mannlicher–Schönauer
- Portuguese-Mannlicher M1896 Portuguese licensed production
- Steyr-Kropatschek M1886/89 Portuguese licensed production for colonial troops
- Lee-Enfield No.1 Mk III* m/917 Remnants of British military aid in WW1
- M1917 Enfield

=== Pistols ===
- Luger P08
- Savage M1907 Portuguese licensed production
- Walther P38
- Mauser C96
- Walther PP

=== Revolvers ===
- Smith & Wesson M1899 Military
- Smith & Wesson No. 3
- Saint Etienne M1892
- Abadie 1886

=== Light machine guns ===
- MG 13
- Lewis Mk I Remnants of British military aid in WW1
- Madsen M1936
- Lewis M1917
- MG 34

=== Machine guns ===
- Vickers Mk I Remnants of British military aid in WW1
- Browning M1919A4
- Breda mod. 37 M/938 portuguese designation

=== Submachine guns ===
- Steyr MP 34
- STEN Mk II m/43 portuguese designation
- Bergmann MP 18/I

== Artillery ==
=== Field artillery ===
- Canon de 75 modèle 1897
- Ordnance QF 25-pounder
- M101 howitzer

=== Mountain artillery ===
- Obice da 75/18 modello 34

== Armoured fighting vehicles (AFVs) ==
- Carden Loyd tankette
- Vickers 6-Ton
- Humber Armoured Car
- Valentine tank

== See also ==
- List of Portuguese military equipment of World War II
- List of common World War II infantry weapons
