= List of aircraft of Portugal in World War II =

This is a list of aircraft used by Portugal in World War II who never fought in World War II but from 1944 cooperated with the Allies in a non-belligerent capacity giving access to Portuguese territorial possessions for Allied forces. A number of Allied aircraft on their way to the North African campaign were forced to land in Portugal due to issues with the aircraft, after landing, Portuguese authorities confiscated the aircraft on grounds that it was illegal for the Allied aircraft to land in Portugal due to Portugal's neutrality. Portugal incorporated the confiscated aircraft into the Portuguese Air Force, this is how a majority of their aircraft were acquired.

== Fighters ==
Model	Image	Country of origin	Role	Variant	Number	Notes
Gloster Gladiator		United Kingdom	Fighter	Gladiator I Gladiator II	30	Portugal received 15 Mark I and 15 Mk II aircraft for its Arma da Aeronáutica Militar (Army Military Aviation), the aircraft delivered in two batches of 15. They received the Portuguese serial numbers 450-464 and 465-479 respectively. The Gladiators served until 1953.
Curtiss Hawk		United States	Fighter	Hawk 75A-4	12	The British government transferred of 12 Hawk 75A-4 variants to the Portuguese Air Force, which assigned them to air defense duties in the Azores.
Lockheed P-38 Lightning		United States	Fighter-bomber	P-38	1	2 P-38s landed in Portugal. One was confiscated while the other was able to take off before being confiscated. Though unnecessary, the Portuguese Government paid the United States US$20,000 for the interned Lockheed P-38 Lightning.
Bell P-39 Airacobra		United States	Fighter	P-39L P-400	23	Between December 1942 and February 1943, the Aeronáutica Militar (Military Aviation) obtained aircraft operated by the 81st and the 350th Fighter Groups originally dispatched to North Africa as part of Operation Torch. Due to several problems enroute, some of the aircraft were forced to land in Portugal and Spain. Of the 19 fighter aircraft that landed in Portugal, all were interned and entered service that year with the Portuguese Army Military Aviation. They formed the Squadron OK, based at Ota Air Base. Though unnecessary, the Portuguese Government paid the United States US$20,000 for each of these interned aircraft. The U.S. accepted the payment and gave as a gift four additional crates of aircraft, two of which were not badly damaged, without supplying spares, flight manuals or service manuals.

== Bombers ==
Model	Image	Country of origin	Role	Variant	Number	Notes
Junkers Ju 86		Nazi Germany	Bomber Reconnaissance aircraft	Ju 86K-7	10	On August 25, 1938, 10 Ju 86K-7s were delivered to Ota Air Base after purchase from Nazi Germany.
Bristol Blenheim		United Kingdom	Light bomber Night fighter Aerial reconnaissance	Blenheim Mk.IV Blenheim Mk.V	25	2 Bristol Blenheims in July 1941 and November 1942, one Mk IV and Mk V respectively, were confiscated after landing due to damages. In 1943 Portugal received 23 Mk IV and Mk Vs from the United Kingdom. They were decommissioned in 1943
Vickers Wellington		United Kingdom	Medium bomber Anti-submarine warfare	?	2	10 Wellingtons landed in Portugal, though 8/10 of the aircraft were thought to have crashed, set fire by the crew, or been damaged beyond recoverability. 2 of the Wellingtons were recovered but not much is known what happened to them.
Consolidated B-24 Liberator		United States	Heavy bomber Anti-submarine warfare Maritime patrol aircraft	?	6	6 B-24 Liberator of various variants were confiscated during the North Africa campaign after landing in Portugal.

== Ground attack aircraft ==
Model	Image	Country of origin	Role	Variant	Number	Notes
Breda Ba.65		Italy	Ground attack aircraft	Ba-65bis	12	In 1939, 12 Ba-65bis models were ordered by Portugal.

== Maritime patrol aircraft ==
- Grumman G-21B Goose
- Short Sunderland-only 1 which did 1 mission

== Liaison/army cooperation ==
- Westland Lysander

== Transport ==
- Junkers Ju 52
- Douglas C-47 Skytrain-only one

== Trainers ==
- Morane-Saulnier MS.230
- De Havilland Tiger Moth
- Airspeed Oxford

== See also ==
- List of Portuguese military equipment of World War II
- List of aircraft of World War II
