= Blockade Runner Badge =

Blockade Runner Badge Abzeichen für Blockadebrecher
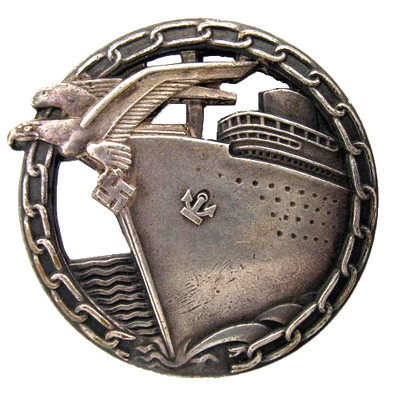
- Designed by Otto Placzeck
- Type: Badge
- Awarded for: service on warships or merchant vessels that attempted to break through the British sea blockade of Germany
- Presented by: Nazi Germany
- Eligibility: Military and non-military personnel
- Campaign: World War II
- Status: Obsolete
- Established: 1 April 1941

The Blockade Runner Badge or the Badge for Blockade Runners (German: Abzeichen für Blockadebrecher) was a World War II German military decoration awarded for service on warships or merchant vessels that attempted to break through the British Blockade of Germany (1939–1945). It was instituted on 1 April 1941 upon the order of Adolf Hitler and first awarded on 1 July of the same year to Hugo Olendorff.

== Design ==
The badge was designed by Otto Placzeck in Berlin. It was in either tombac or zinc and featured a ship with a large German eagle grasping a swastika on its bow. Around the circumference of the badge is a chain, through which the ship is cutting. The eagle was silvered whilst the rest of the badge was a dark gray colour.

The badge was worn on the left breast pocket of the uniform. A smaller half-size version was awarded for use by civilians and members of the merchant marine.
