= List of Portuguese military equipment of World War II =

This is a list of Portuguese military equipment in use during World War II. Portugal remained neutral until 1944 when it cooperated with the Allies as a non-belligerent. However the leader of Portugal during World War II as well as during the Spanish civil war António de Oliveira Salazar said at the outbreak of World War II that the 550 year old Anglo-Portuguese Alliance was still intact and that Portugal would come to Britain's aid if they requested it but as they did not they would remain neutral. The alliance most likely meant that Portugal while being neutral until 1944 was from the beginning of the war in favour of the Allies.

== Weapons ==
- List of World War II weapons of Portugal

== Aircraft ==
- List of aircraft of Portugal in World War II
