= Swiss Patriotic Federation =

Far right organization in Switzerland (1919–1948)

The Swiss Patriotic Federation (German: Schweizerischer Vaterländischer Verband (SVV); French: Fédération patriotique suisse; Italian: Federazione patriottica svizzera (FPS)) was a right-wing political organisation in Switzerland between 1919 and 1948.

== History ==
The SVV was set up on 5 April 1919 by Eugen Bircher as a reaction to the Swiss general strike of 1918 and violent and bloody revolutions and suppressions of these revolutions in nearby regions across the border. It also acted to oppose 'international emigration', which in effect became anti-Semitism, with the group holding The Protocols of the Elders of Zion as fact, alongside a similar work Aufklärung zur Flüchtlingsfrage (Shedding Light on the Refugee Question). Bircher's position as a colonel in the Swiss Army was such that he was able to bring many high-ranking officers in to the SVV, including General of the Swiss Armed Forces Henri Guisan. Although not specifically Nazi in its outlook, it nonetheless sought to maintain cordial relations with Nazi Germany.

It was effectively open in its existence, but its membership was largely a closely guarded secret and as such the group became influential in driving government policy. Its influence was such that it was the only organisation with Nazi sympathies that was not closed down by the Swiss Federal Council in 1945. It was not dissolved until after it got caught up in a bribery scandal in 1948.
