= Naval Artillery War Badge =

Naval Artillery War Badge Kriegsabzeichen fur die Marine-Artillerie
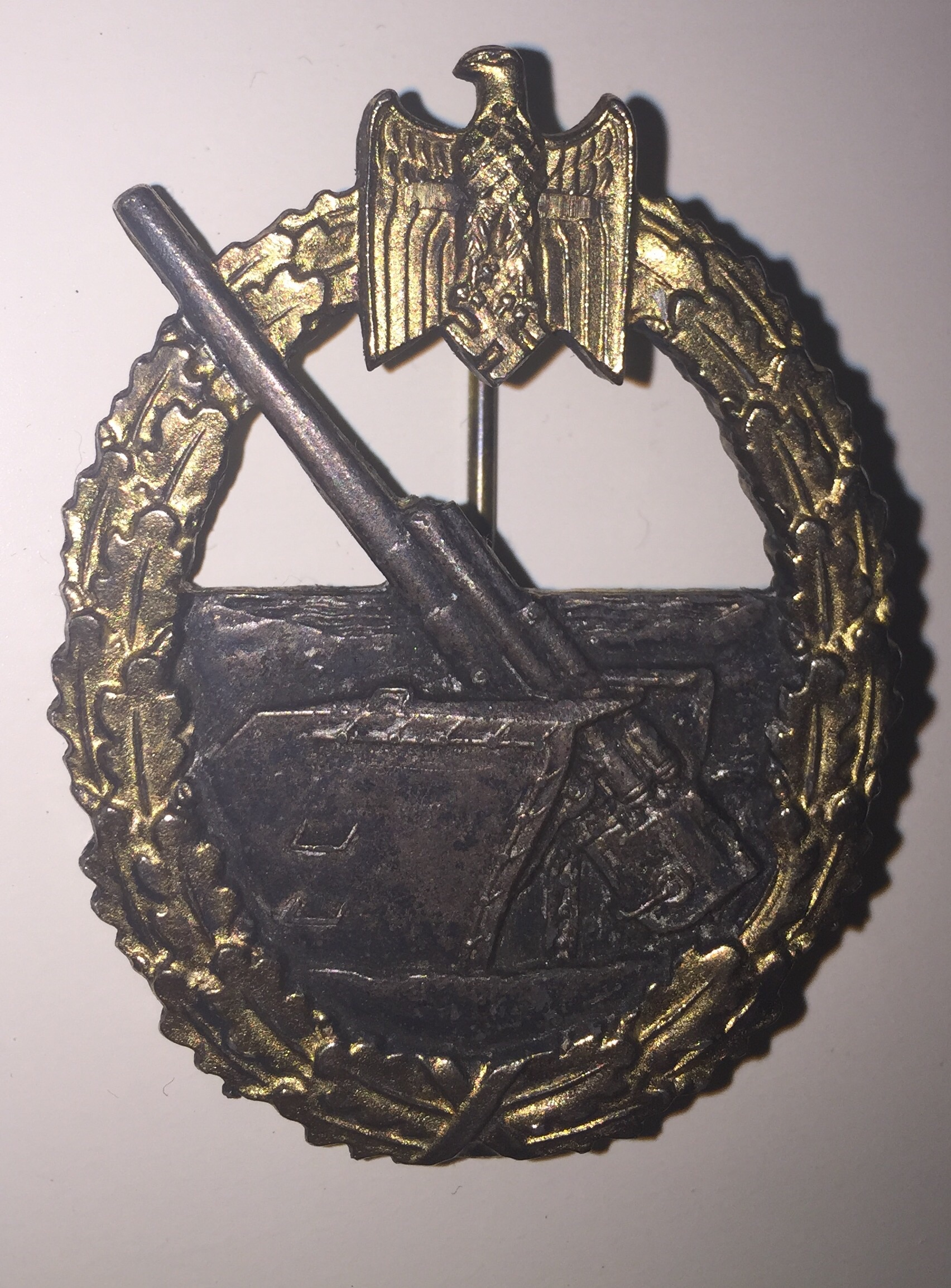
- Type: Badge
- Awarded for: Service in Kriegsmarine land-based marine artillery and anti-aircraft units
- Presented by: Nazi Germany
- Eligibility: Military personnel
- Campaign: World War II
- Status: Obsolete
- Established: 24 June 1941

The Naval Artillery War Badge or War Badge for the Coastal Artillery (German: Kriegsabzeichen für die Marineartillerie) was a World War II German military decoration awarded to the crews of Kriegsmarine land-based marine artillery and anti-aircraft units. It was presented to personnel of coastal defense units, and anti-aircraft units. The award was instituted on 24 June 1941 by Grand Admiral Erich Raeder to reward the actions of both individuals and crew members. It was also awarded to those killed in action in said units.

== Description ==
The medal was designed by Otto Placzek of Berlin. It consists of an outer laurel wreath of oak leaves with the German Eagle at the top, displaying "down-swept" wings while clutching a swastika (both gold in colour). The central area featured a coastal artillery gun with the sea behind (in grey colour). The early war version were made of bronze and later nickel. Inferior quality late-war versions were made of "pot or monkey metal". The medal was worn on the lower part of the left breast pocket of the naval service tunic.

== Criteria for award ==
A crew could receive the award by achieving eight points:

- Two for downing an aircraft unassisted
- One for downing an aircraft assisted by another crew
- half a point for non-gun crew members, operating a searchlight, fire control, sound locator or radio operator for aiding in the downing of aircraft

The badge was issued in a single degree only.
