= Bulgarian M36 helmet =

Helmet of the Bulgarian Army before and during World War II

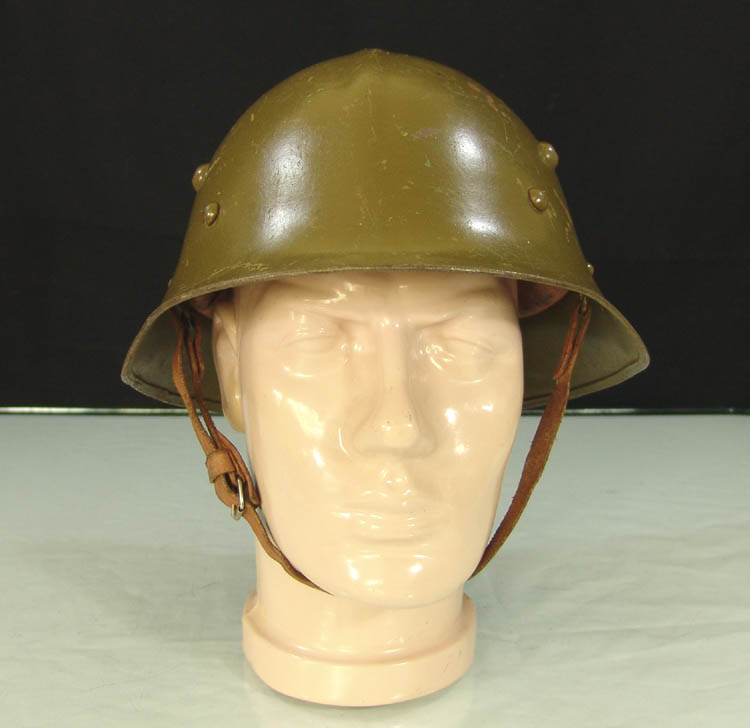
M36 Helmet type A front

The Bulgarian M36 helmet (in Bulgarian: Каска М36) was the basic helmet of the Bulgarian Army prior to the outbreak of World War II and during the Bulgarian participation in the war. Its latest variant is still in service along with several different modern helmets, but is being phased out in favor of more modern kevlar helmets.

== History and variants ==
During World War I Bulgarian soldiers were equipped with the German Stahlhelm M1916, which remained in service up to the end of the 1930s. The restrictions imposed on the Bulgarian Army by the Treaty of Neuilly-sur-Seine of 1919 were overcome in the mid-1930s and in 1935 the High Command ordered the design of a new army helmet. At the end of 1935 the prototype was ready and subsequently approved in 1936.

The general design was distantly reminiscent of the Stahlhelm, but with some considerable alterations. The general structure and depth were similar, but the brim was shortened, opened wider and more gradually turned. The ventilation apertures were retained, but set in smaller rounded fittings. The angles of the side and upper surfaces were conically increased with the aim of causing hits of over 90° angle to ricochet. From mid-front to mid-rear a well-pronounced projecting rib was shaped. As a result, the helmet received a very distinctive outline with only a distant likeness to the Stahlhelm. It was made of steel with only a small quantity of the first model made of lighter laminated iron, exclusively as officers' dress gear. The edges of the shell were rolled over and the two frontal liner pins bulged out in the earliest type known as A, while on the later type known as B these were straight cut with the same large liner pins. In 1939 a new redesigned version with shallowed shell and shortened brim, known as type C, was brought into service. An estimated 70% of all production was of this third model. Factory-issued helmets were initially dark greyish-green in colour with a small shield in Bulgarian flag colours on the right. Later new brighter pea-green shade was introduced. The leather suspension, or liner, were produced in several different variants. The M36 helmet design became lighter, more compact, and more comfortable than the First World War-era designs and provided excellent protection.

It was introduced in regular service in 1936. Initially, production began outside Bulgaria in three foreign factories: Sandrik in Dolné Hámre and Brüder Gottlieb und Brauchbar in Brno (Bratři G&B – Brno) in Czechoslovakia and Eisenhuttenwerk Thale in Thale, Germany. In the end of 1935 a punching press was imported from Germany to Bulgaria and installed at the military works in the town of Kazanlak, and subsequently production continued in Bulgaria as well.

The earlier bigger and heavier types A and B were phased out in the early 1950s, but the latest type C is still in service in the Bulgarian army, but is being phased out completely in the 2010s, in favor of a newer kevlar helmet, the BK-3 developed by the Croatian-based company Šestan-Busch. Note that the photo of the type A interior liner is post war.

== Gallery ==
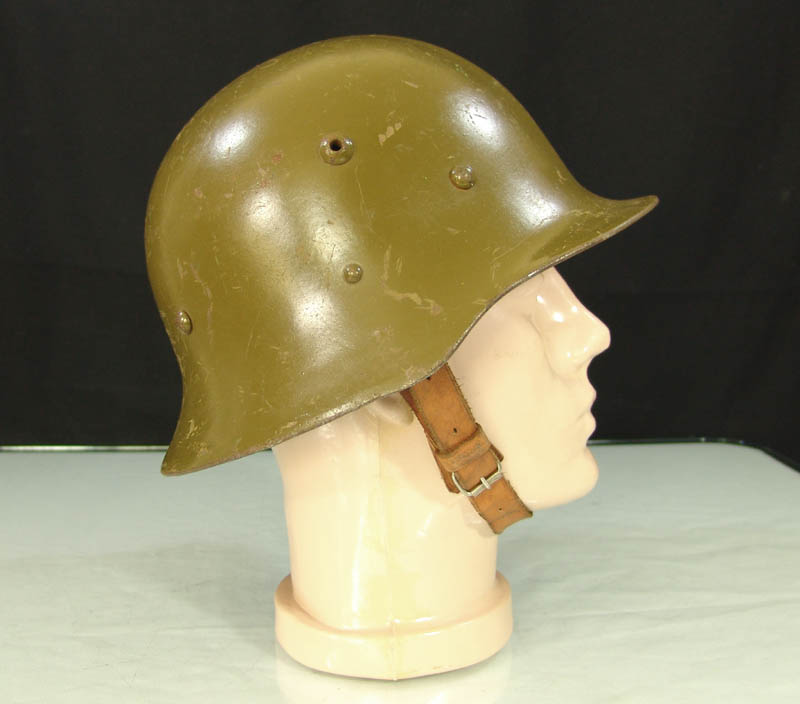
M36 Helmet type A side

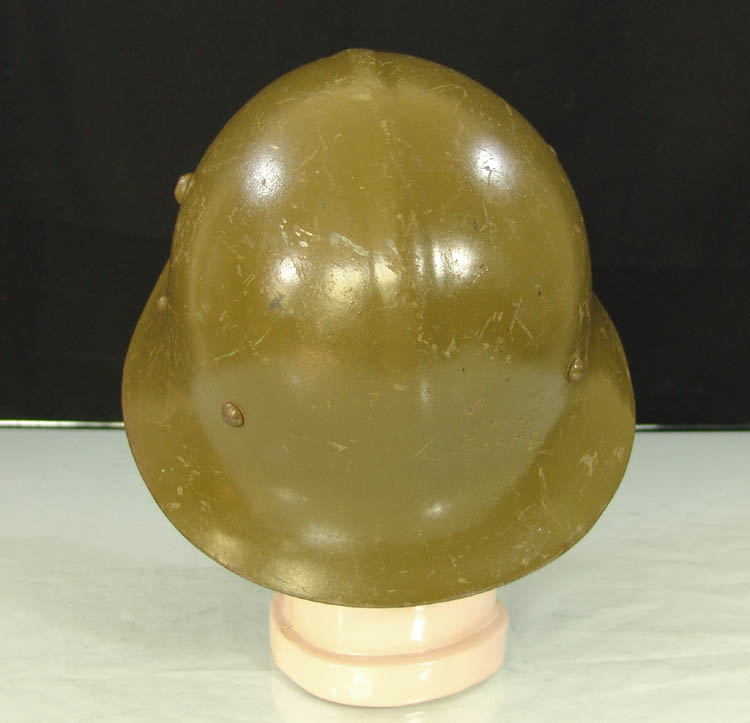
M36 Helmet type A rear

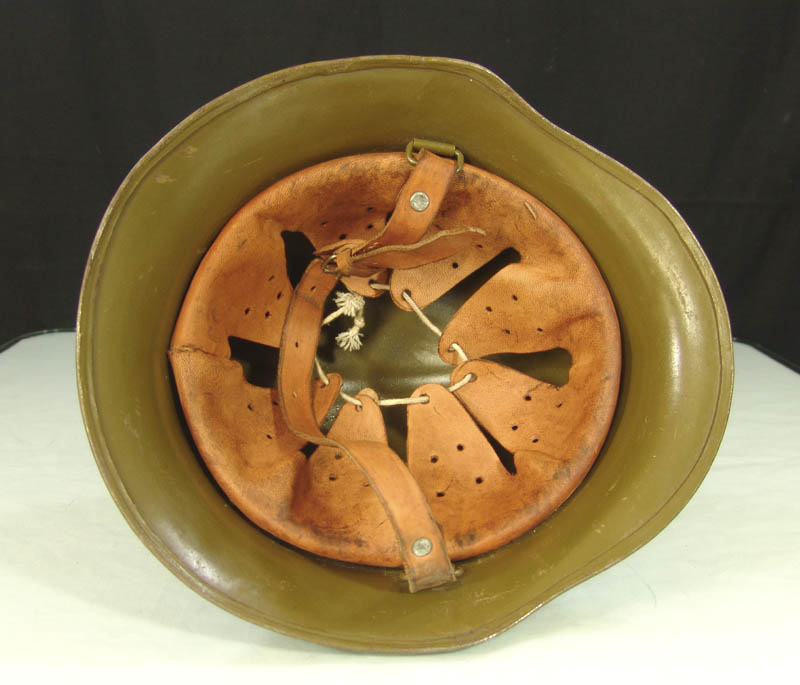
M36 Helmet type A inside

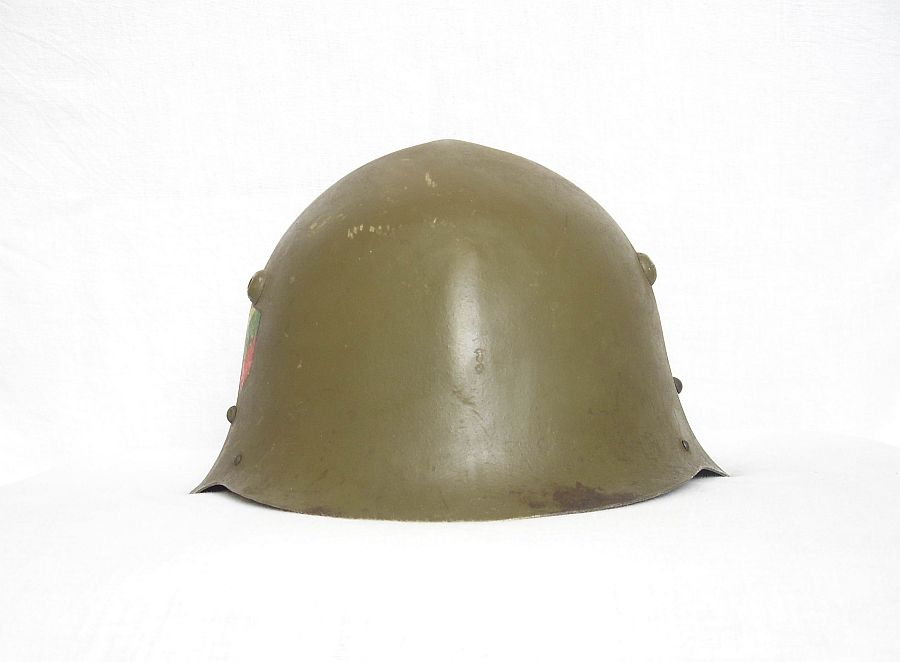
M36 Helmet type C front

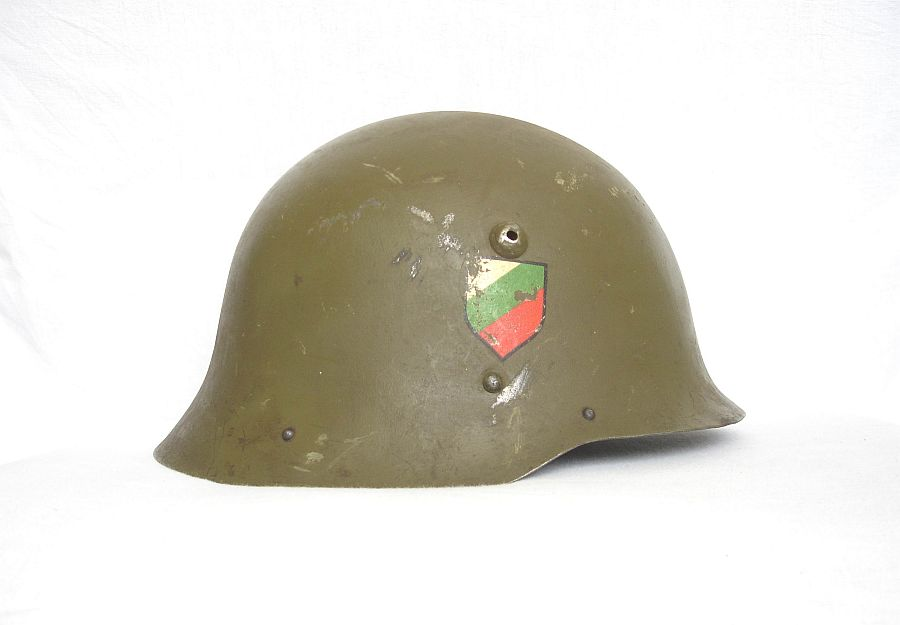
M36 Helmet type C side

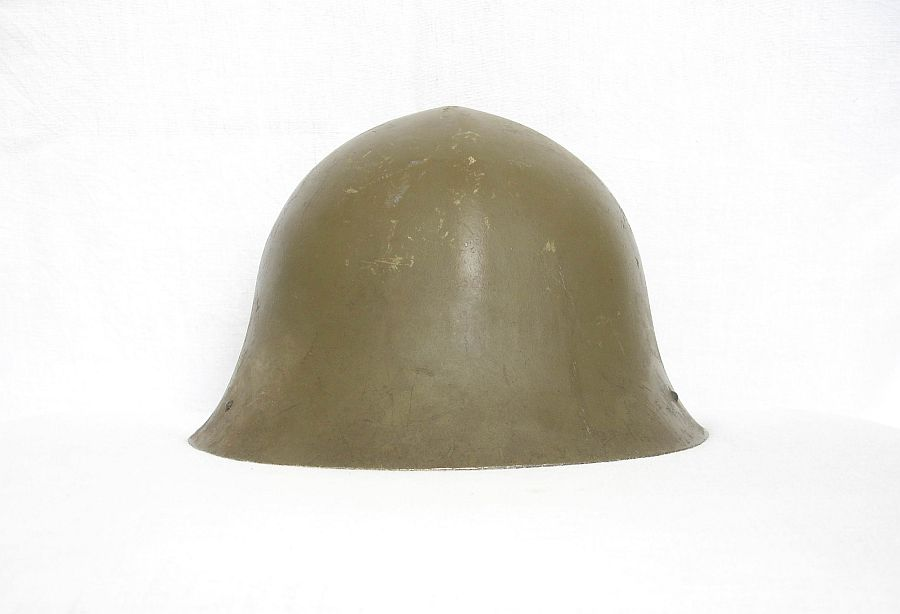
M36 Helmet type C rear

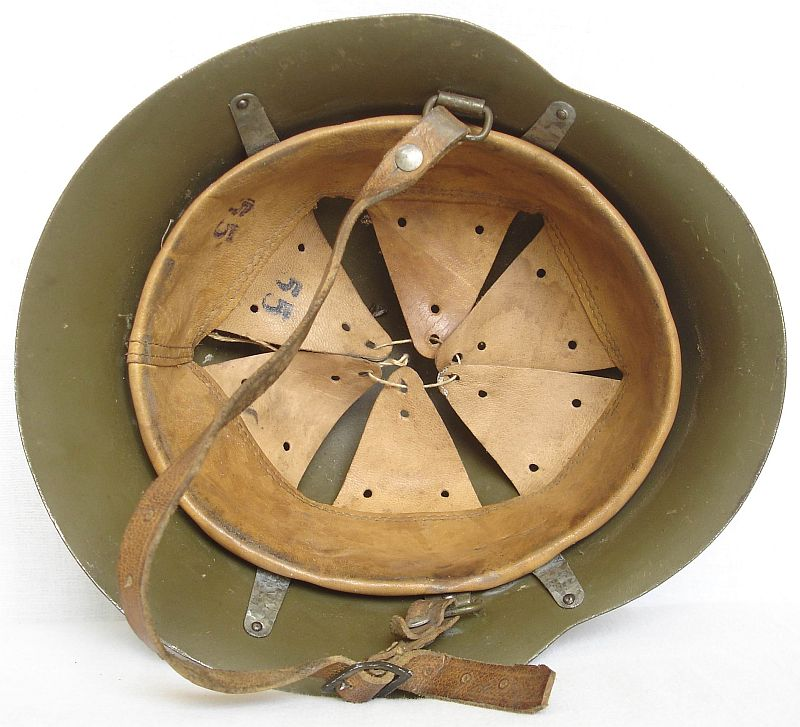
M36 Helmet type C inside
