= List of aircraft of Switzerland in World War II =

This is a list of aircraft of the Swiss Air Force during World War II. During World War II, despite Switzerland being neutral throughout, Swiss pilots did engage with axis and allied aircraft to defend Swiss airspace.

== Fighters ==
- EKW D3800 (licensed production of M.S 406)
- Messerschmitt Bf 109

== Ground attack ==
- EKW C-36

== Bombers ==
- Dornier Do 217-1 only confiscated

== Liaison or army cooperation ==
- Messerschmitt Bf 108 Taifun

== Trainers ==
- Morane-Saulnier MS.230
- Bucker Bu 131
