= List of aircraft of Yugoslavia in World War II =

This is a list of aircraft of the Royal Yugoslav Air Force during World War II. More specifically the German invasion of Yugoslavia.

== Fighters ==
- Hawker Fury
- Hawker Hurricane
- Ikarus IK-2
- Rogožarski IK-3

== Bombers and reconnaissance ==
- Bristol Blenheim
- Potez 25

== Trainers ==
- Bréguet 19
