= List of aircraft of Finland in World War II =

This is a list of aircraft used by the Finnish Air Force during World War II. Finland operated a wide variety of aircraft during World War II from several countries. The main objective of the Finnish Air Force during World War II was to maintain air superiority over Finland to prevent Soviet aircraft reinforcing the advance of Soviet ground forces into Finland. However Finnish bombers did exist and provided support to Finnish ground troops. The Finnish Air Force caused far higher losses during the war to the Soviet Air force than they received, shooting down 1,621 Soviet aircraft as opposed to 210 Finnish aircraft shot down.

== Fighters ==
- Polikarpov I-15
- Gloster Gauntlet
- Gloster Gladiator
- Hawker Hurricane
- Messerschmitt Bf 109
- Morane-Saulnier M.S.406
- Fokker D.XXI
- Fiat G.50 Freccia
- Curtiss P-36 Hawk
- Brewster F2A Buffalo
- Caudron C.714
- Petlyakov Pe-3
- Lavochkin-Gorbunov-Gudkov LaGG-3
- Curtiss P-40 Warhawk
- VL Myrsky

== Bombers ==
- Tupolev SB
- Bristol Blenheim
- Dornier Do 17
- Junkers Ju 88
- Petlyakov Pe-2
- Fokker C.X

== Torpedo bombers ==
- Blackburn Ripon
- Dornier Do 22
- Heinkel He 115
- Fokker T.VIII

== Reconnaissance ==
- Aero A.11
- Beriev MBR-2
- Heinkel He 59

== Liaison/army cooperation ==
- Fieseler Fi 156 Storch
- Westland Lysander

== Transport ==
- Junkers Ju 52
- Douglas DC-2

== Trainers ==
- Polikarpov Po-2
- De Havilland Tiger Moth
- Avro Anson

== Prototypes ==
- VL Humu
- VL Pyörremyrsky

== Bibliography ==
- Keskinen, Kalevi & Stenman, Kari (2004). LeR 5: Erillinen Lentolaivue, Lentolaivue 36, Lentolaivue 15, Lentolaivue 6, Lentolaivue 30. Kari Stenman, Itä-Uudenmaan paino. ISBN 951-98751-7-4.
