= List of aircraft of Spain in World War II =

This is a list of the aircraft of the Spanish Air Force during World War II. The main role of the Spanish airforce during World War II was to keep Spanish neutrality as can be seen when Spanish aircraft tried to keep allied aircraft out of the Spanish protectorate in Morocco during Operation Torch. This list does not show the aircraft of the Spanish volunteer Blue Squadron as they were part of the Luftwaffe in that role not the Spanish Air Force despite being Spanish pilots.

== Fighters ==
- Polikarpov I-15
- Polikarpov I-16
- Heinkel He 51
- Heinkel He 112
- Arado Ar 68
- Messerschmitt Bf 109
- Fiat G.50 Freccia
- Fiat CR.32

== Ground attack and dive bombers ==
- Henschel Hs 123
- Breda Ba.65

== Bombers ==
- Heinkel He 111
- Junkers Ju 86
- Junkers Ju 88
- Dornier Do 17
- Savoia-Marchetti SM.79 Sparviero
- Savoia-Marchetti SM.81 Pipistrello
- Fiat BR.20 Cicogna
- Caproni Ca.310
- North American B-25 Mitchell-One confiscated aircraft

== Maritime aircraft ==
- Dornier Do 24
- Focke-Wulf Fw 200 Condor
- CANT Z.501 Gabbiano
- CANT Z.506 Airone
- Fairey Swordfish-Confiscated

== Trainers ==
- Bücker Bü 131 Jungmann
- Bücker Bü 133 Jungmeister
- Gotha Go 145
- De Havilland Tiger Moth
