= Ōtomo Yoshinao =

- 大友能直
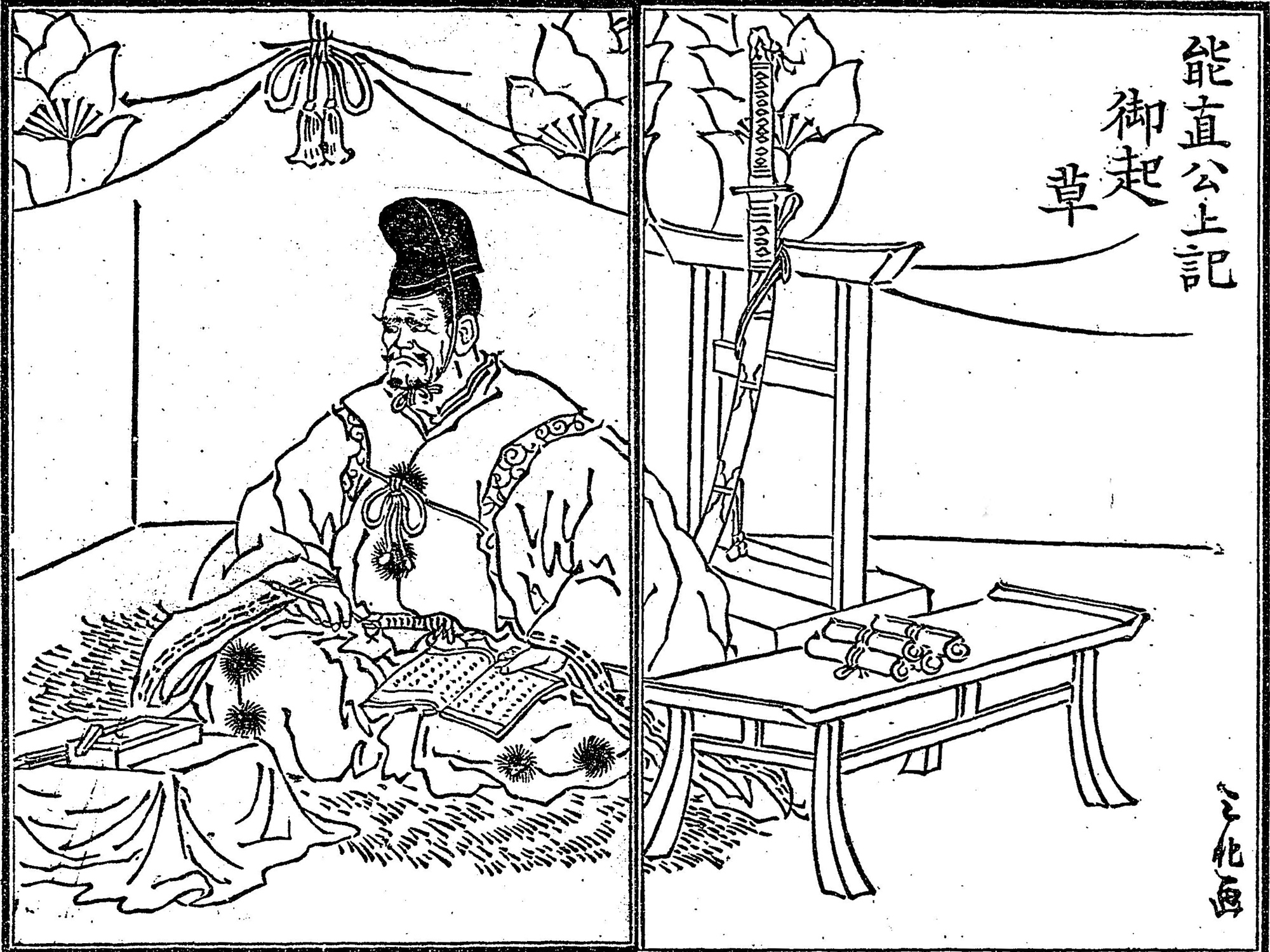
- From Ōtomo Yoshinao Kō Go-Ichidaiki

Defense Commissioner of the West
- In office February 11, 1196 – December 20, 1223
- Monarchs: Go-Toba; Tsuchimikado; Juntoku; Chūkyō; Go-Horikawa
- Preceded by: Nakahara no Chikayoshi

Governor of Buzen Province
- In office February 11, 1196 – December 20, 1223

Governor of Bungo Province
- In office February 11, 1196 – December 20, 1223

Governor of Chikugo Province
- In office 1207 – December 20, 1223

Lieutenant of the Left Division of Inner Palace Guards
- In office November 4, 1188 – December 20, 1223

Personal details
- Born: January 29, 1172
- Died: December 20, 1223 (aged 51)
- Spouse: Shinmyō
- Parents: Nakahara no Chikayoshi (adoptive father) Kondō Yoshishige (father); Tone no Tsubone (mother)
- Occupation: samurai lord

Ōtomo Yoshinao (大友 能直, January 29, 1172 - December 20, 1223) was a Japanese samurai lord and gokenin of the early Kamakura period. He was a close retainer of shogun Minamoto no Yoritomo, even called his "matchless favorite", and served as Governor of Buzen and Bungo Provinces, Defense Commissioner of the West and Lieutenant of the Left Division of Inner Palace Guards (Sakon no shōgen) under the Kamakura shogunate. He was the founder of the Ōtomo clan. He held the court rank of Junior Fifth Rank, Lower Grade.

== Life ==
=== Early life ===
Kondō Ichihōshimaru was born on January 29, 1172, the son of Kondō Yoshishige, the head of Furushō township in Sagami Province. His family were mid-ranking court nobility from Kyoto. Regarding his parentage, there is a theory that he was the illegitimate son of Minamoto no Yoritomo, but this theory has been widely refuted by modern historians. It has been concluded that he was in fact a descendant of the Fujiwara clan. His mother, Tone no Tsubone, was the daughter of Hatano Tsuneie.

After his elder sister married court official Nakahara no Chikayoshi, Yoshinao became an adopted son of Chikayoshi, and became known as Nakahara no Yoshinao. He succeeded the position of the head of Ōtomo township from his maternal side of family, and became known as Ōtomo Yoshinao, thus establishing the Ōtomo clan.

=== Career ===
From a young age, he served as a close retainer of shogun Minamoto no Yoritomo. After Yoshinao's genpuku (coming-of-age ceremony), he succeeded the position of Defense Commissioner of the West previously held by his adoptive father Nakahara no Chikayoshi, and became the steward of Ōno Manor in Bungo Province (present-day Ōita Prefecture).

In Azuma Kagami, Yoshinao is described as a very close associate of Yoritomo stating that he was Yoritomo's "matchless favorite".

In 1189, he participated in the Battle of Ōshū.

In 1193, when Yoritomo came under attack by Soga Tokimune during the Revenge of the Soga Brothers incident, Yoshinao stopped Yoritomo from trying to draw his sword and getting involved in a fight to protect him.

On July 19, 1199, Chikayoshi, who was busy in Kyoto, received news that Yoritomo's daughter Sanman was in critical condition. Chikayoshi and Yoshinao hurried straight to Kamakura. Yoshinao brought Tamba Tokinaga, a Kyoto physician, to Chikayoshi's Kamakura mansion. Despite their efforts, Sanman died on July 30 and was buried at a temple in Kamegayatsu, near Chikayoshi's mansion.

According to the Ōtomo genealogy, Yoshinao was appointed Defense Commissioner of the West and Governor of Buzen and Bungo Provinces in Kenkyū era. However, this has been pointed out to be an error, and that all of these positions were handed to him by his adoptive father Nakahara no Chikayoshi.

Yoshinao died in Kyoto on December 20, 1223, aged 51. He left his government positions to his children and wife Shinmyō.

== Genealogy ==
The Ōtomo clan claims descent from Emperor Seiwa (850-881) through the Seiwa Genji lineage of the Minamoto clan. Although the clan genealogy claims Yoshinao to be an illegitimate son of Minamoto no Yoritomo, it has been concluded that he was in fact a descendant of the Fujiwara clan, as the son of Kondō Yoshishige of the Kondō clan.

Yoshinao's paternal uncle was Mutō Yorihira, and Yorihira's nephew (raised like his own son), Mutō Sukeyori, founded the Shōni clan. In addition, Kondō Kunihira, who was a gokenin of Minamoto no Yoritomo, was Yoshinao's second cousin, and the descendants of his younger brother, Tamura Nakanori, later became members of the Mizunoya clan.

Ōtomo Yoshinao's descendants served as Governor of Buzen and Bungo Provinces for generations further establishing the power of Ōtomo clan in these two provinces. The clan would expand their power in Bungo Province along with the Shiga clan, founded by Yoshinao's eighth son Shiga Yoshisato, that had settled there earlier. Following the unrest of the Nanboku-chō period, the clan became an influential Shugo Daimyo family in Bungo, Buzen, and Chikugo Provinces during the Muromachi period. Yoshinaga, 19th generation descendant of Yoshinao, along with his son Yoshiaki further became Sengoku period Daimyos. At the time of 21st generation Yoshishige, the Ōtomo clan reached its zenith by expanding its power to Hizen, Higo, and Chikuzen Provinces. At its zenith, the Ōtomo clan ruled six provinces (Buzen, Bungo, Hizen, Higo, Chikuzen and Chikugo) and two half-provinces (Hyūga and Iyo).

== Yoritomo's Illegitimate Son Theory ==
Yoshinao's mother, Tone no Tsubone, was once a concubine of Minamoto no Yoritomo, and Yoshinao's adoptive father, Nakahara no Chikayoshi, was a close retainer of Yoritomo. There is a theory that Yoshinao was an illegitimate son of Yoritomo because of his relationship with her mother, and in Ōtomo genealogy, Yoshinao is inscribed as an illegitimate son of Yoritomo.

In addition, there is a theory that Tone no Tsubone never was a concubine of Yoritomo as it is not described in the records at that time such as the Azuma Kagami. In the Kōan era Ōtomo genealogy, Yoshinao's paternal lineage goes straight from Fujiwara no Hidesato to Yoshinari, and states no differing theories to this lineage. From this, it has been pointed out that there was no theory about Yoshinao being an illegitimate son of Yoritomo in the late Kamakura period.

Furthermore, it has been said that this theory was created after Yoshinao's 7th generation descendant, Ōtomo Yasushi, and all his brothers, were taken in by Ashikaga Takauji as nephews (raised like his own son) during Takauji's revival campaign in Kyushu. There is a viewpoint that this theory was created to recall the memories about the relationship of Yoritomo and Yoshinao for the fictitious parent-child relationship of Takauji and the Ōtomo brothers.

== Family ==
- Adoptive father: Nakahara no Chikayoshi
- Father: Kondō Yoshishige
- Mother: Tone no Tsubone (daughter of Hatano Tsuneie)
- Wife: Shinmyō (daughter of Hatakeyama Shigeyoshi)
  - Eldest son: Ōtomo Chikahide
  - Eighth son: Shiga Yoshisato
  - Son: Takuma Yoshihide
  - Son: Ōtomo Tokinao
  - Son: Motoyoshi Arinao
  - Son: Ōtomo Chikanao
  - Son: Ōtomo Satoyoshi
  - Son: Ōtomo Asanao
  - Son: Ichimada Tokikage
  - Son: Washio Hidenao
  - Son: Buzen Yoshimoto
  - Son: Nakahara no Yasuhiro
  - Daughter: Hōjō Tomotoki's wife

== See also ==
- Ōtomo clan
- Chinzei Bugyō
