= Nakahara no Chikayoshi =

Japanese court noble and official (1143–1209)

- 中原親能

Governor of Kyoto
- In office 1201–1205
- Monarch: Tsuchimikado
- Succeeded by: Nakahara no Suetoki

Defense Commissioner of the West
- In office 1195 – February 10, 1196
- Succeeded by: Ōtomo Yoshinao

Personal details
- Born: 1143
- Died: January 25, 1209 (aged 66)
- Parent: Nakahara no Hirosue (adoptive father) Fujiwara no Mitsuyoshi (father)
- Occupation: Court noble, shogunate official

Nakahara no Chikayoshi (中原 親能, 1143 - January 25, 1209) was a Japanese court noble and shogunate official of the late Heian and early Kamakura period. He served as Governor of Kyoto, Defense Commissioner of the West and Magistrate of Public Affairs under the Kamakura shogunate. As a court official he served as Vice-Minister of Saiin Palace, Vice-Governor of Mino Province, Senior Assistant to Minister of Ceremonial Affairs and Head of Bureau of Imperial Palace Cleaning, and held the court rank of Senior Fifth Rank. He was the father of Ōtomo Yoshinao, the founder of the Ōtomo clan, and has been credited for creating a foundation for the future dominant position of the Ōtomo clan in Kyushu.

== Life ==
=== Early life and family ===
Chikayoshi was born in 1143, the son of Associate Counselor Fujiwara no Mitsuyoshi. He was adopted by his maternal grandfather Nakahara no Hirosue, the Imperial University chief expert on law. The Nakahara family had served in the position for generations since the mid-Heian period. There is also a theory that he was the biological son of Hirosue. He had a brother, Ōe no Hiromoto. Nakahara no Moroshige, the father of Grand Secretary of the Great Council of State (daigeki) Nakahara no Morokazu, a close associate of 4th shogun Kujō Yoritsune, was his first cousin. Chikayoshi later changed his surname of Fujiwara. He grew up in Sagami Province and met the future shogun Minamoto no Yoritomo when Yoritomo was exiled there.

=== Career as court official ===
Chikayoshi started off as a low-ranking court official. As a court official he served as Vice-Minister of Saiin Palace, Vice-Governor of Mino Province, Senior Assistant to Minister of Ceremonial Affairs and Head of Bureau of Imperial Palace Cleaning, and held the court rank of Senior Fifth Rank, Lower Grade.

In 1180, while serving as Vice-Minister of Saiin Palace, he contacted Yoritomo. During the Genpei War, an arrest order was issued on Chikayoshi for anti-Taira clan activities, forcing him to flee Kyoto.

=== Career as shogunate official ===
After fleeing to Kamakura, he entered the service of the newly established Kamakura shogunate. In a 1183 message sent by Chikayoshi to his former superior Vice-Counselor of the Second Rank Minamoto no Masayori, Chikayoshi can be seen returning to Kyoto as an emissary of Yoritomo. Chikayoshi worked together with Minamoto no Yoshitsune as court emissaries facilitating the smooth payment of taxes to the provincial governorates and manors.

In 1184, together with Minamoto no Noriyori and Yoshitsune, he and the shogunate forces entered Kyoto after defeating Minamoto no Yoshinaka. At Masayori's Kyoto residence, Chikayoshi negotiated with the court nobles and planned a conspiracy against the Taira clan with Dohi Sanehira. Chikayoshi then returned to Kamakura as an emissary of Emperor Go-Shirakawa to bring Yoritomo to the capital.

The same year, Chikayoshi became an official in the shogunal records office. However, aside from civil service, he was also involved in military campaigns, and he continued his participation in the conspiracy plan while serving at the records office. He fought around the country and participated in the Battle of Ōshū during the punitive expedition against the Taira clan. His distinguished achievements in battle earned him a commendation by Yoritomo. Chikayoshi's brother-in-law Ōe no Hiromoto was invited to Kamakura by Yoritomo because of the family connection, and was appointed administrator (bettō) of the records office in 1184.

After the war against the Taira clan was over in 1185, Chikayoshi accompanied Cloistered Emperor Go-Shirakawa in rain through the ceremony of drawing in the eyes of the Daibutsu.

In 1191, he was appointed as magistrate of public affairs, becoming a career civil official for the shogunate. He often took the role of a diplomat during negotiations between the shogunate and the Imperial Court.

In 1193, Yoritomo set Bizen Province under the taxation of Tōdai-ji temple for its reconstruction and appointed monk Mongaku as its administrator. Chikayoshi was appointed in charge of the sculpting of Ākāśagarbha, along with other retainers of Yoritomo being in charge of the construction of many temples and statues associated with Tōdai-ji.

Chikayoshi was appointed Defense Commissioner of the West in 1195, and effectively ruled many manors in the provinces of Bungo, Chikuzen, Hizen, Hyūga, Ōsumi and Satsuma in Kyushu.

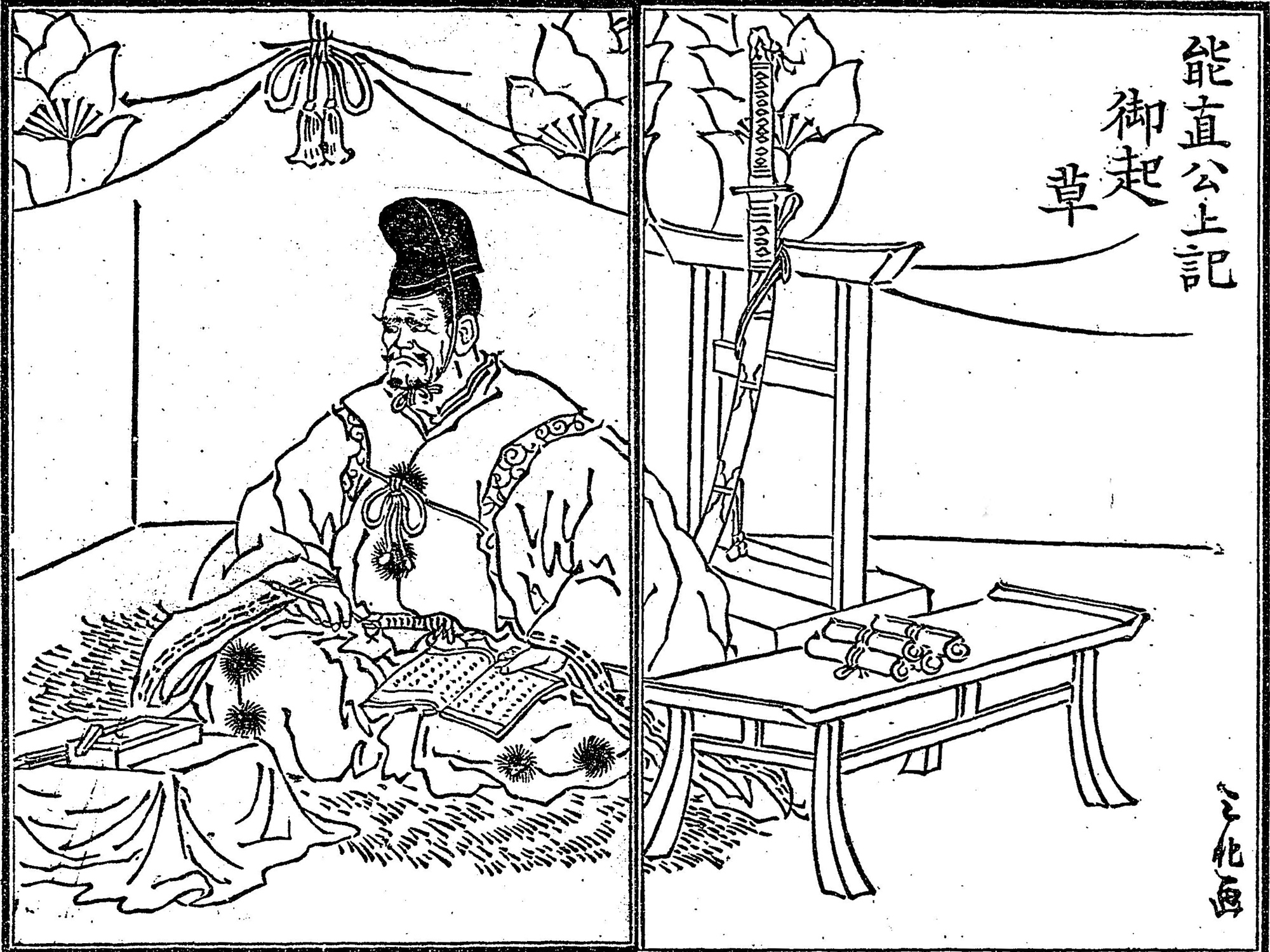
The heir and son of Chikayoshi, Ōtomo Yoshinao

Chikayoshi adopted a son, Ōtomo Yoshinao, who would become the founder of the Ōtomo clan. He had another son, Nakahara no Suetoki.

On July 19, 1199, Chikayoshi, who was busy in Kyoto, received news that Yoritomo's daughter Sanman was in critical condition. Chikayoshi was the husband of her nanny. Chikayoshi and Yoshinao hurried straight to Kamakura. Yoshinao brought Tamba Tokinaga, a Kyoto physician, to Chikayoshi's Kamakura mansion. Despite their efforts, Sanman died just eleven days later and was buried at a temple in Kamegayatsu, near Chikayoshi's mansion. Following Sanman's death, Chikayoshi became a monk and took the Dharma name Jakunin.

The same year, shogun Minamoto no Yoritomo died. After this, an assassination conspiracy against Inner Minister Minamoto no Michichika was exposed. Chikayoshi was sent as the Magistrate of Public Affairs by the shogunate to Kyoto for negotiations and to take care of the three perpetrators Nakahara no Masatsune, Gotō Motokiyo and Ono Yoshinari. The three were stripped from their territories and the conspiracy mastermind Mongaku was banished to Sado Island.

From 1201, he served as Governor (shugo) of Kyoto. In this role, he stayed in Kyoto and sustained diplomatic relations between the shogunate and the court.

=== Death ===
Chikayoshi died on January 25, 1209, in Kyoto, at the age of 66. His heir, Yoshinao, inherited the territories of Bungo Province among others.

== Connection to Ōtomo clan ==
It is empirically supported that Chikayoshi possessed enormous territory and authority in Kyushu. It is theorized that the Ōtomo clan's territory in Bungo Province was inherited from Chikayoshi by Ōtomo Yoshinao. Therefore, historian Seiichirō Seno argues that it is clear that the Ōtomo clan's major success in Kyushu stemmed from Yoshinao's adoptive (or foster) relationship with Chikayoshi.

== In popular culture ==
=== TV series ===
- Kusa Moeru (草燃える) (1979) NHK Taiga drama, Kuniyasu Atsumi as Nakahara no Chikayoshi

== See also ==
- Chinzei Bugyō
- Ōtomo clan
