= Shiga Yoshisato =

13th-century Japanese samurai lord

Shiga Yoshisato (志賀 能郷) was a Japanese samurai lord of the Kamakura period. He was the founder of the Shiga clan, a branch of the Ōtomo clan. He was also known as Buzen Hachirō.

== Life ==
Shiga Yoshisato was born as the eighth son of Ōtomo Yoshinao and Shinmyō. Yoshinao was a gokenin of shogun Minamoto no Yoritomo and the founder of the Ōtomo clan, and served as Governor of Buzen and Bungo Provinces, Defense Commissioner of the West and Lieutenant of the Left Division of Inner Palace Guards (Sakon no shōgen) under the Kamakura shogunate. Shimyō was the daughter of Hatakeyama Shigeyoshi, lord of Hatakeyama Manor.

In 1223, his father Yoshinao died at the age of 51 and handed him over the position of governor (jitō), and the territory, of Kachigazuru, Buzen Province.

In 1240, Yoshisato founded the Shiga clan after Shimyō handed him over the position of jitō of Shiga, Ōno Manor, Bungo Province.

At the time of his Buddhist refuge, he received the Buddhist name Shinjyaku.

== Genealogy ==
After Shiga Yoshisato, the Shiga clan, along with the Ōtomo clan, returned to Bungo Province during the Mongol invasion in 1274, and both expanded their power in Kyushu. The Ōtomo clan became an influential Shugo Daimyo family in northern Kyushu, further becoming Sengoku Daimyo during the Sengoku period. At its zenith, the Ōtomo clan ruled Buzen, Bungo, Chikugo, Hizen, Higo, and Chikuzen Provinces, as well as half of Hyūga and Iyo Provinces.
