= Shōni clan =

Japanese samurai clan

Shōni clan 少弐氏
- The Shōni clan mon
- Home province: Chikuzen
- Parent house: Fujiwara clan
- Titles: Shōni
- Dissolution: 16th century

Shōni (少弐氏, Shōni-shi) was a family of Japanese nobles descended from the Fujiwara family, many of whom held high government offices in Kyūshū. Prior to the Kamakura period (1185–1333), "Shōni" was originally a title and post within the Kyūshū (Dazaifu) government, roughly translating to "Junior Counselor", and working under a Daini (大弐).

Dominated by members of the Fujiwara branch family of Mutō, the title over time came to be used as a family name. When Minamoto no Yoritomo established the Kamakura shogunate in 1185, he reorganized the administration of Kyūshū. The post of Chinzei Bugyō replaced that of Daini, and the Shōni were similarly pushed out of their traditional hereditary position; members of the family were, however, still granted various other important posts in the region.

Members of the family would play an important role in commanding the defense against the Mongol invasions of Japan in 1274 and 1281.

They would later ally with Ashikaga Takauji and the Northern Court in the Nanboku-chō Wars of the 14th century. Repeatedly defeated by the Ōuchi family in the 14th and 15th centuries, the Shōni gradually lost their territories, and were eliminated entirely by the Ryūzōji clan in the mid-16th century.

== Shōni of note ==
- Shōni Tsunesuke (1226–1289) – fought the Mongols
- Shōni Kagesuke (d. 1285) – fought the Mongols
- Shōni Yorihisa – fought in the Nanboku-chō Wars
- Shōni Sukemoto (1497–1532)
- Shōni Tokinao – son of Sukemoto, last head of the clan
