= Nanboku-chō period =

Period of Japanese history from 1336 to 1392

Nanboku-Cho Period
- Part of Muromachi period
- The capitals of Northern line (Kyoto) and Southern Line (Yoshino)
| Date | 1336 to 1392 (56 years) |
| Location | Japan |
| Result | Unification under Northern Court |

Belligerents
| Ashikaga shogunate Northern Court | Southern Court |

Commanders and leaders
| Ashikaga Shoguns: Ashikaga Takauji (1338–1358); Ashikaga Yoshiakira (1358–1367); Ashikaga Yoshimitsu (1368–1394); Northern Court Emperors: Kōgon (1331–1333); Kōmyō (1336–1348); Sukō (1348–1351); Go-Kōgon (1352–1371); Go-En'yū (1371–1382); Go-Komatsu (1382–1392 pretender; 1392–1412 legitimate) | Southern Court Emperors: Go-Daigo (1336–1339); Go-Murakami (1339–1368); Chōkei (1368–1383); Go-Kameyama (1383–1392; abdicated); Key Generals: Kusunoki Masashige †; Nitta Yoshisada †; Kitabatake Akiie † |

Strength
| Total regional mobilization: ~50,000–100,000+ warriors (estimated at peak of the conflict) | Initial loyalist forces: ~20,000–40,000 warriors (variable from each province) |

Casualties and losses
| Significant: High among the provincial samurai clans during the Kannō Disturbance | Heavy: Near total destruction of the Kusunoki clan and Nitta clan high command |

The Nanboku-chō period (南北朝時代, Nanboku-chō jidai), also known as the Northern and Southern Courts period, was a period in Japanese history between 1336 and 1392, during the formative years of the Muromachi (Ashikaga) shogunate. During this time, two opposing Imperial courts and their respective claimants as Emperor were engaged in conflict over their claims to the Chrysanthemum Throne, with the Southern Court ultimately renouncing their claim in favor of the Northern Court in 1392. This period became a source of contention for many Japanese historians and scholars over the following centuries. Initially, the North's victory in the dispute led official histories to paint them as the legitimate claimants. In function, the Northern pretenders were puppet rulers under the direct control of the Kamakura and Ashikaga shogunates, while the Southern claimants maintained control of the Japanese Imperial Treasures, the sacred artifacts that confirmed an Emperor's legitimacy. To officially resolve this historical dilemma, in 1911 Emperor Meiji issued an edict that the Emperors of the Southern Court were the legitimate claimants during this period.

The destruction of the Kamakura shogunate in 1333 and the failure of the Kenmu Restoration in 1336 opened up a legitimacy crisis for the new shogunate. Institutional changes in the estate system (shōen) that formed the bedrock of the income of nobles and warriors altered the status of the various social groups. The establishment of the Ashikaga shogunate broadened the economic base of the warriors, while undercutting the noble proprietors. However, this trend had started already with the Kamakura bakufu.

== Background ==
During the early period, there existed a Northern Imperial Court, established by Ashikaga Takauji in Kyoto, and a Southern Imperial Court, established by Emperor Go-Daigo in Yoshino.

The main conflicts that contributed to the outbreak of the civil war between the courts were the growing conflict between the Hōjō clan and other warrior groups in the wake of the Mongol invasions of Japan of 1274 and 1281 and the failure of the Kenmu Restoration, which triggered the struggle between the supporters of the imperial loyalists and supporters of the Ashikaga clan.

Disaffection towards the Hōjō-led Kamakura regime appeared among the warriors towards the end of the 13th century. This resentment was caused by the growing influence of the Hōjō over other warrior families within the regime. The Mongol invasions were the main cause behind this centralization of power that took place during the regency of Hōjō Tokimune (1268–1284). During the crisis, three things occurred: Hōjō family appointments to the council of state increased; the Hōjō private family council became the most important decision making body; and direct vassals of the Hōjō were increasingly promoted to the shugo (governor) posts. This reduced the base of support to encompass Hōjō family members and their direct vassals.^{Note a} When a coalition against the Hōjō emerged in 1331, it took only two years to topple the regime.

Since wealth in pre-industrial, agrarian societies is tied to land, land became the main reason for much discontent among the warrior class. Since the Kamakura period, victory in battle would be rewarded by land grants. Due to the nature of a foreign invasion, the victory against the Mongol invasions meant that there were no lands to hand out to the victors.

When the Kamakura bakufu was destroyed in 1333, the Kyoto court society emerged to confront the warrior class. In the transition from the Heian to the Kamakura period, the warriors were free from the domination of court patrimonialism. With the demise of the Kamakura, the imperial court attempted to restore its power in the Kenmu Restoration. Not until the Meiji Restoration of the 19th century did this occur again.

=== Kenmu Restoration: 1333–1336 ===
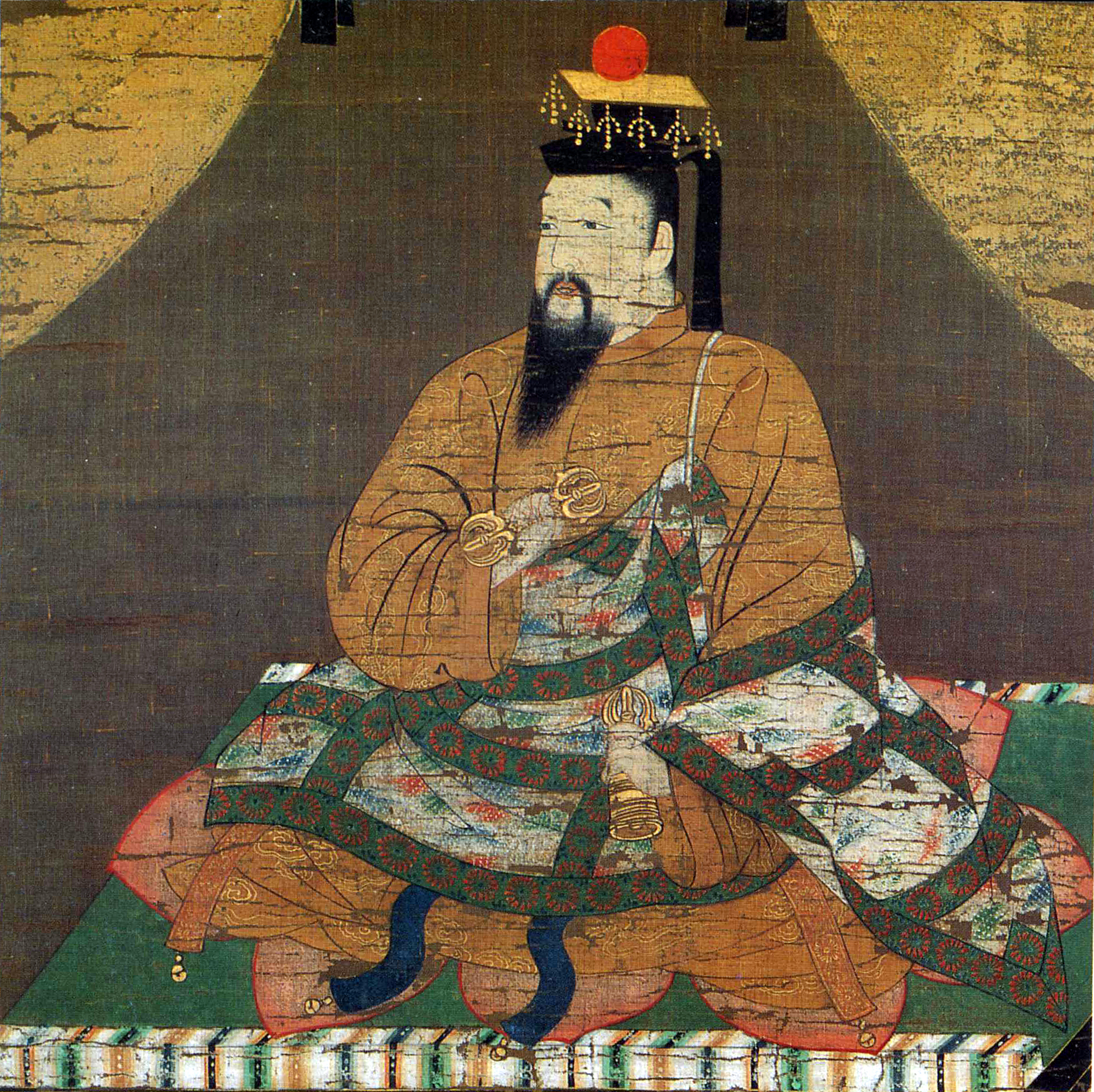
Silk painting of Emperor Go-Daigo, by the monk Kōshin, 1339 CE

In the spring of 1333, the Emperor Go-Daigo and his supporters planned to restore the glory of the imperial court. Emperor Daigo (AD 901–923), who lived at a time when the court had no strong rivals and effective rule was exercised directly from the throne, became Go-Daigo's adopted name and model. The Kenmu Restoration was a conscious movement to restore the imperial power vis-a-vis the warrior class. Two of the movement's greatest spokesmen were Prince Morinaga and Kitabatake Chikafusa. Prince Morinaga was Go-Daigo's son, and archrival to Ashikaga Takauji since he advocated the militarization of the nobles as a necessary step towards effective rule. Morinaga epitomized Chikafusa as the latter was a Kyoto noble who was also military general. During the long siege in Hitachi (1338–1343), Chikafusa wrote the Jinnō Shōtōki, an influential work on the legitimacy of the Japanese imperial system. This text would later become an ideological base of the Meiji Restoration in the 19th century.

However, the Kenmu Restoration failed due to Go-Daigo's desire to restore not only imperial power, but also its culture. He wrote a treatise (Kenmu Nenchū Gyōji) to revive court ceremonies that had fallen out of use. However, shortly thereafter, the samurai clans became increasingly disillusioned with the reestablished imperial court, which sought to return to the social and political systems of the Heian period. Sensing their discontent, Takauji pleaded with the emperor to do something before rebellion would break out, however his warnings were ignored. Hōjō Tokiyuki, son of Takatoki, took the opportunity to start the Nakasendai rebellion to try to reestablish the shogunate in Kamakura in 1335. Takauji put down the rebellion and took Kamakura for himself. Taking up the cause of his fellow samurai, he claimed the title of Sei-i Taishōgun and allotted land to his followers without permission from the court. Takauji announced his allegiance to the imperial court, but Emperor Go-Daigo sent Nitta Yoshisada to reclaim Kamakura. In 1336 Takauji rebelled against the imperial court and proclaimed the beginning of a new shogunate. He captured Kyoto for a few days in February 1336, only to be driven out and fled to Kyūshū due to the arrival of forces under Prince Takanaga, Prince Norinaga, Kitabatake Akiie and Yūki Munehiro, who attacked and defeated him near Kyoto. This betrayal of the Kenmu Restoration by Takauji blackened his name in later periods of Japanese history, and officially started the Nanboku-chō War. Earlier historiography taught the Restoration failed due to the ineffectiveness in rewarding lands to the samurai. However, it is now clear that the Restoration was effective in this respect. Therefore, Takauji's rebellion and desire to create a new warrior regime was a prime determinant in the Restoration's failure. His rebellion encouraged the warrior class who desired to see the creation of another military regime modeled after the Kamakura bakufu. After Takauji and his brother were forced to retreat to the west, he then allied himself with the clans native to Kyūshū. After defeating the Kikuchi clan at Hakata Bay in the Battle of Tatarahama (1336), Takauji was "virtually master of Kyushu". At the decisive Battle of Minatogawa in 1336, Takauji defeated Yoshisada again and killed Masashige, allowing him to seize Kyoto for good, beginning the turbulent period which saw two emperors fight each other and which would last for almost 60 years. When Ashikaga's army entered Kyōto, Emperor Go-Daigo resisted, fleeing to Mount Hiei, but seeking reconciliation, he sent the imperial regalia to the Ashikaga side. Takauji enthroned the Jimyōin-tō emperor, Kōmyō, and officially began his shogunate with the enactment of the Kenmu Law Code. Go-Daigo escaped from the capital in January 1337, the regalia that he had handed over to the Ashikaga being counterfeit, and set up the Southern Court among the mountains of Yoshino.

The Nanboku-chō War was an ideological struggle between loyalists who wanted the Emperor back in power, and those who believed in creating another military regime modeled after Kamakura. Chikafusa was pragmatic on the need for warriors to participate in the Restoration but a severe divergence between Chikafusa and Takauji polarized the leaders for many years. The failure of the Restoration led to the emergence of the Ashikaga shogunate.

== Internal conflicts: 1350s ==
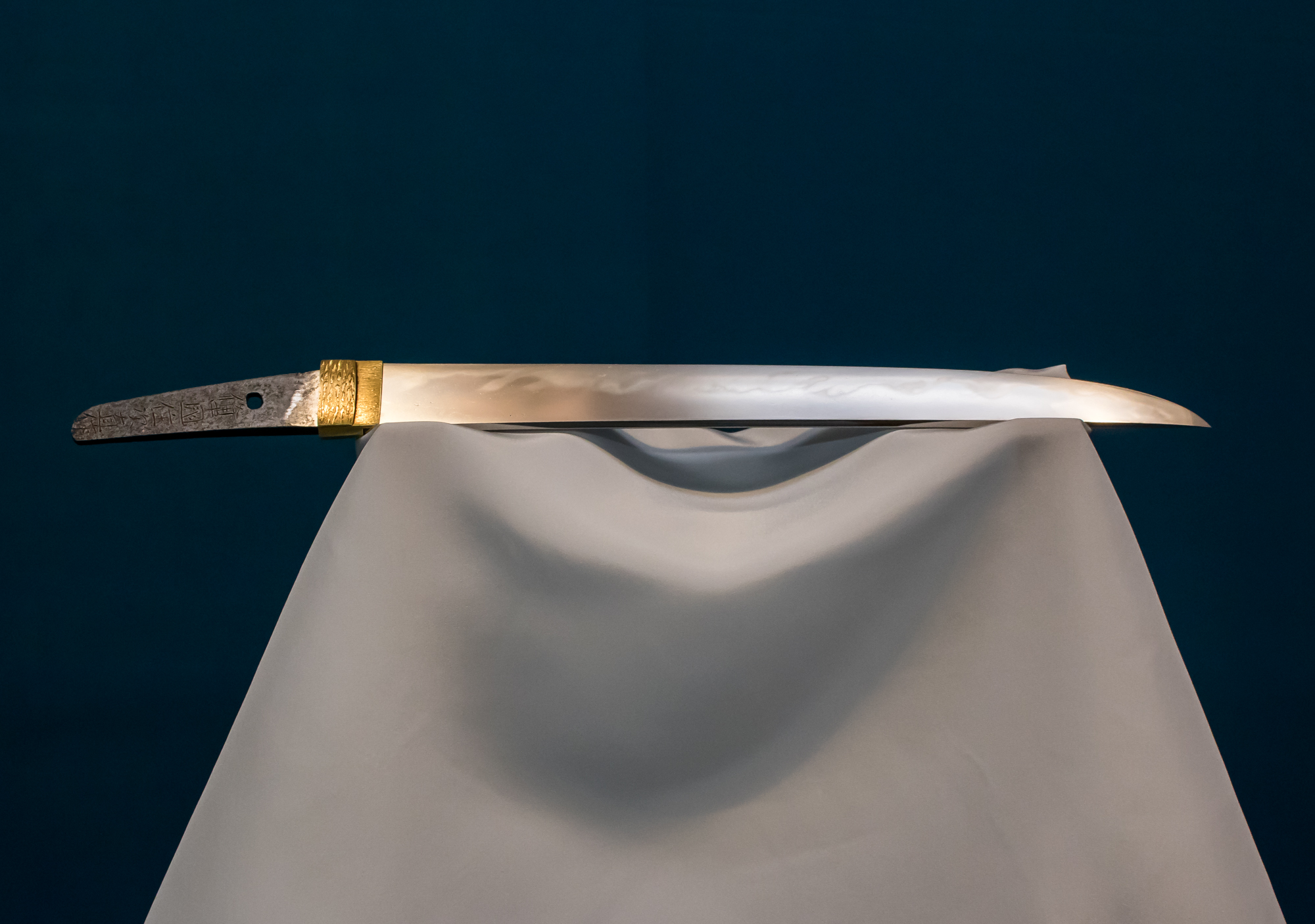
Tantō (dagger) signed by Tsugunao, 1358

Takauji was nominally shōgun but, having proved not to be up to the task of ruling the country, for more than ten years Ashikaga Tadayoshi governed in his stead. Relations soured between the brothers during the Kannō disturbance. This started when Takauji made Kō no Moronao his shitsuji (deputy), which led Tadayoshi to unsuccessfully have him assassinated.^{Note c} His plot was discovered, so Tadayoshi in 1349 was forced by Moronao to leave the government, shave his head and become a Buddhist monk under the name Keishin. In 1350 he rebelled and joined his brother's enemies, the supporters of the Southern Court, whose Emperor Go-Murakami appointed him general of his entire army. In 1351 he defeated Takauji, occupied Kyoto, and entered Kamakura. During the same year he captured and executed the Kō brothers at Mikage (Settsu Province). The following year his fortunes turned and he was defeated by Takauji at Sattayama. A reconciliation between the brothers proved to be brief. Tadayoshi fled to Kamakura, but Takauji pursued him there with an army. In March 1352, shortly after an ostensible second reconciliation, Tadayoshi died suddenly, according to the Taiheiki by poisoning.

=== Reasons of conflict ===
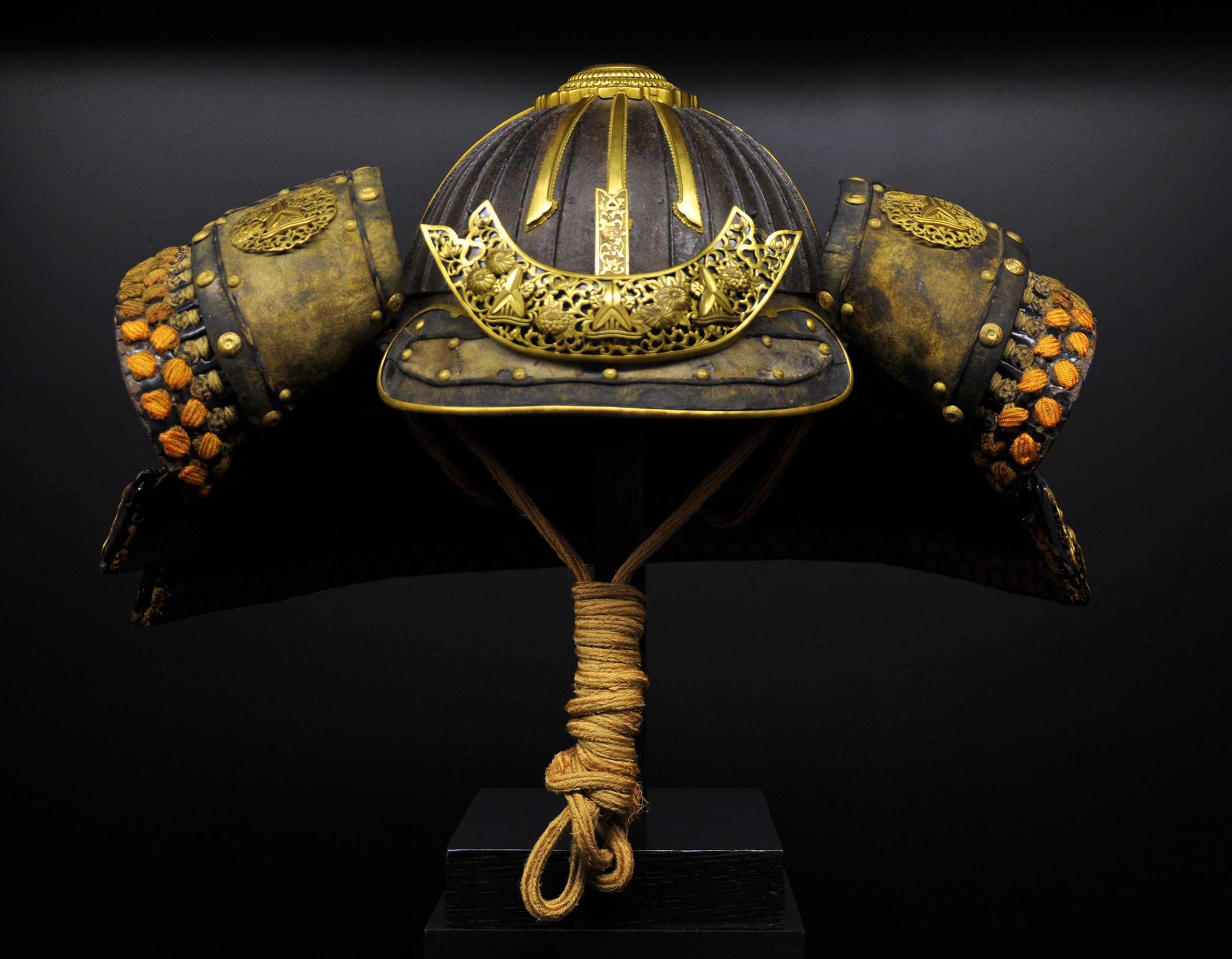
Kabuto helmet, circa 1380

In the 1350s, the Kannō disturbance and its aftermath divided and nearly destroyed the early regime. This event divided the Muromachi regime and put a temporary hold on integration. On the surface the incident appeared as a personal struggle between Tadayoshi against the Kō brothers, backed by Takauji. However, differences in opinion regarding the estate system and the separation of bureaucracies controlled by Takauji and Tadayoshi played a larger part in the conflict.

Since the bureaucracy were under separate jurisdictions between Takauji and Tadayoshi, this created a disunited administration. Takauji was the leader of the house vassals, and thus controlled the Board of Retainers where disciplinary actions towards house vassals: brigandage and other crimes were prosecuted. He also led the Office of Rewards which heard claims of and to enfeoff deserving vassals. It was used to enroll new warriors who were potential adversaries of the regime.

Tadayoshi meanwhile led the Board of Inquiry which had control over the judicial functions of the regime. The major judicial organ, the Board of Coadjutors, decided on all land dispute cases and quarrels involving inheritance. Bureaucrats (bugyōnin) for the new regime were recruited from the ranks of those who served the Hōjō regime before its fall. They were valuable because they knew how to read and write, a task beyond the reach of most warriors.

Takauji encouraged innovation, while Tadayoshi was a conservative who wanted to preserve the policies of the past. As a military leader, Takauji appointed vassals to shugo posts as a reward for battlefield heroics, and he divided the shōen estates giving half of it to his vassals in fief or as stewardships, both of which was contested by Tadayoshi. He also opposed any sort of outright division of estate lands.

All this led to conflict and resulted in the regime losing its support. Deep divisions between members of the Ashikaga family strengthened the opposition. Both Tadayoshi and Takauji enacted token submissions to the Southern Court to push their own agendas: Tadayoshi desired to destroy the Kō brothers, and Takauji wanted to defeat Tadayoshi.

=== Rise of the Southern Court ===
The incident led reinvigorations on the war effort of the Southern Court. To a large extent this renewed offensive was made possible by turncoats from the Muromachi regime. The imperialist offensive of 1352 directed against Takauji in Kamakura was made possible by the vast numbers of former adherents of Tadayoshi who became supporters of the imperialist leader Nitta Yoshimune. The imperialist offensive against Kyoto in 1353 was made possible through the defection of the shugo lord Yamana Tokiuji; Tadayoshi's adopted son, Ashikaga Tadafuyu, became the leader of the western armies of the Southern Court during the imperialist offensives against Kyoto in 1353 and 1354.

== Rise of the shugo lords ==
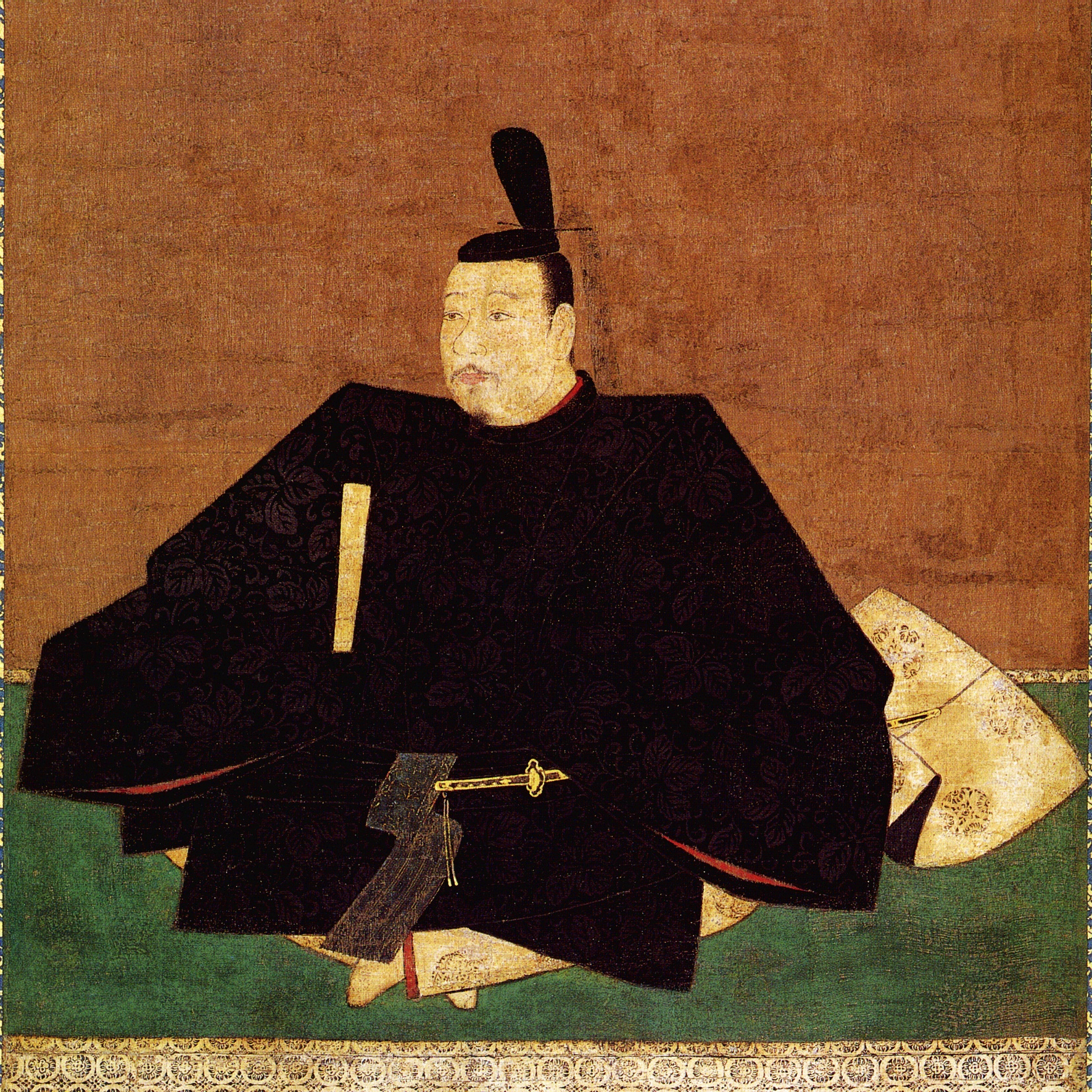
Ashikaga Takauji

The shōgun Ashikaga Takauji appointed branch family members as shugo lords in the different provinces of western and central Japan. Ashikaga branch families appointed to shugo posts included the Hosokawa, Yamana, Imagawa, Hatakeyama, Niki, Kira, Shiba, Ishido, and the Isshiki families. While some warriors were appointed to shugo posts. Successful generals, who were at the same time branch family heads who had cast in their lot with Takauji's rebellion, were the ones often rewarded with the post. The cost of not tying them to the regime was to lose their support, and to encourage their independence from the regime.

The shugo acted as governors, and served the function of mediating between the regime center and periphery. As lords in their own right, they represented the authority of the regime in the provinces. The shugo of this period had greater power than that of the Kamakura, including sending envoys where land disputes occurred, law enforcement, issuing hanzei (a half-tax), and to levy taxes. They came to hold much greater authority than the samurai houseman by virtue of having a province-wide appointment. After 1372, shugo lords were given the responsibility to collect taxes (tansen) on landowners, nobles and samurai. As middlemen, the shugo profited by inflating the taxes. On the 1370s onwards the shugo were given the added responsibility of overseeing a new regime centered tax. Warrior families since the Kamakura period were characterized by the use of headship rights (soryo) where leadership over branch families was accorded to the leader of the main family. However, headship rights were extremely unstable as branch families often asserted their own independence, particularly as new generations emerged to dilute the ties of kinship.

In some provinces, the Ashikaga failed to displace the original shugo families: the Sasaki, Togashi (of the famed Togashi Masachika), Takeda and the Ogasawara in the central provinces, and the Shimazu, Otomo and Shoni in Kyūshū. Those provincial families who had accumulated power throughout the Kamakura period, like the Ouchi of Nagato and the Shimazu of Satsuma, were lords in their own right and thus less dependent on the regime and on their shugo titles. There was the defection of local samurai families like the Mori, and shugo lords continued to act in a dangerously independent manner until the latter half of the 14th century. In the central and western provinces roughly half were new appointees. During the Kannō Incident, Ashikaga headship (soryo) ties to the new appointees did not prevent these shugo from outright rebellion towards the regime at all. In fact, the coercive institutions of the regime were woefully lacking in this time period vis-a-vis the shugo lords. However, some weaker shugo lords who had not yet built up their power in the provinces had a vested interest in maintaining their links to the regime.

=== Shugo usurpation of civil functions and shugo uke ===
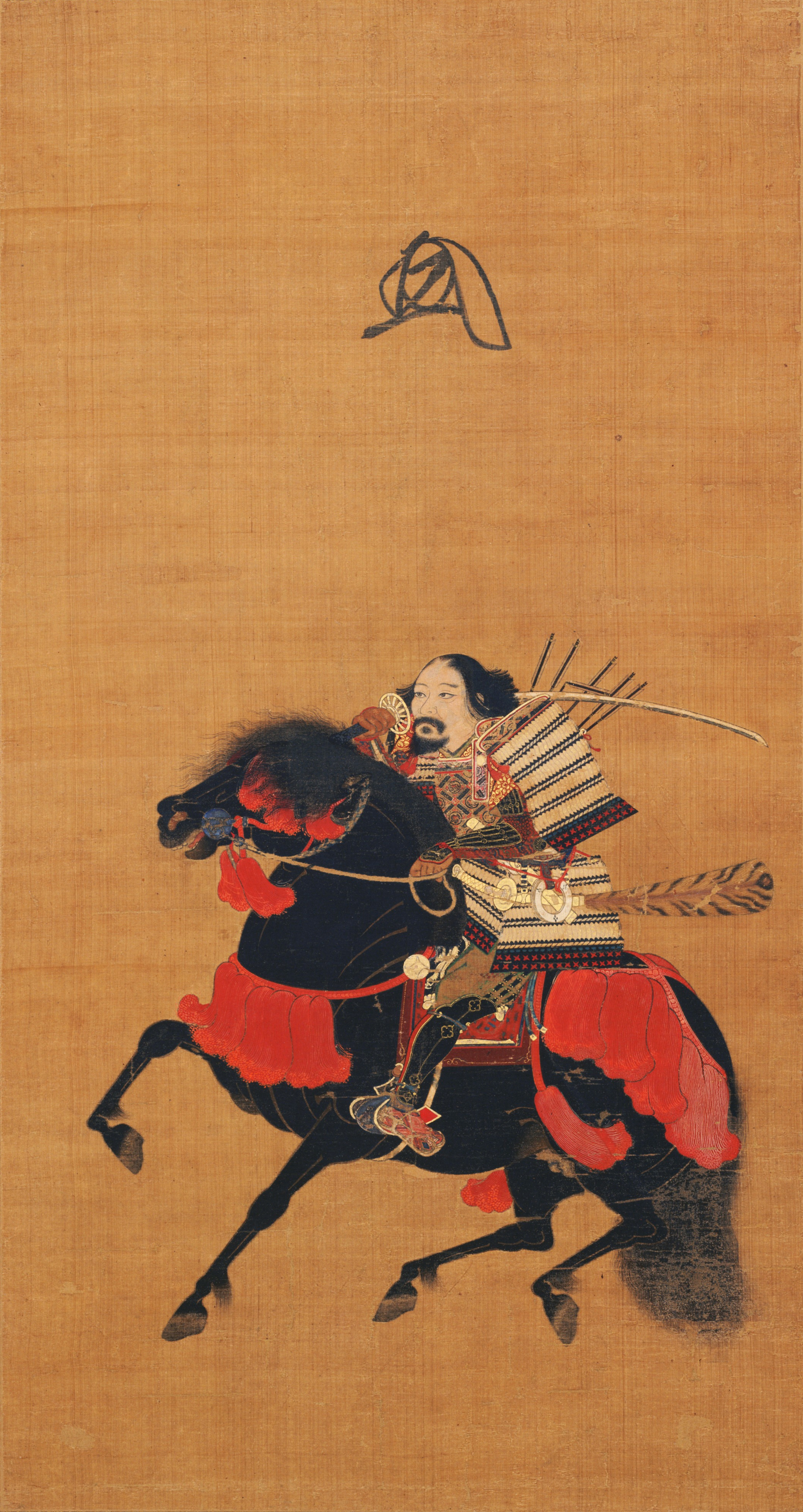
14th century silk painting of a mounted warrior, sometimes believed to be Kō no Moronao or Ashikaga Takauji. Kept in Kyoto National Museum

The office of civil governor was gradually usurped by the shugo, he was able to make his provincial power effective through the ties of vassalage with the samurai who had taken over the estate lands during the Nanboku-chō War, and with the samurai residing on public lands (kokugaryo). The shugo lords have certain legitimate duties given to them by the Muromachi regime, and feudal lords attempting to enfeoff vassals. During the Nanboku-chō War, samurai stewards frequently took the lands of nobles and converted them into private holdings (chigyo) illegally. This led to the total liquidation of the estate system. The shugo lords also participated in this wholesale land grab by accumulating former estates under their control by enfeoffing samurai on them. This encroachment on land caused security problems for all landed interests from petty samurai to the kokujin, and led local samurai to seek intermediary ties to the shugo lords in the form of vassalage as the shugo could provide some form of local security.

Vassalage ties between the shugo lord and kokujin was called a shugo-uke (shugo contracts). This was where a noble proprietor would give the responsibility of managing his estate to the shugo in exchange for a guaranteed year end (nengu) income delivered to the proprietor residing in the capital. The shugo lord then enfeoffed vassal samurai (hikan) on those estates as managers. The shugo contracts tied the interests of the shugo lord, the samurai kokujin and the noble together, but were not based on equality of interests. The contract was most favorable to the shugo lord who used this instrument to expand ties of vassalage with the local samurai (kokujin), and expand his land base at the expense of the nobles.

Shugo contracts emerged in the 1340s and gradually became widespread. Shugo lords gave the management of the estate to samurai in exchange for military service, but the noble was stripped of all powers on the estate, and was reduced to waiting for his portion of the year end (nengu) income. The noble hired tax overseers (nengu daikan) at an exorbitant amount to guarantee his own portion of the income. Noble income (already reduced by the kokujin and the shugo lord) was further reduced once the tax overseer took his half. This reduction in noble income was the result of gradual non-payment by the shugo and samurai. Therefore, the nobles hired moneylenders (doso) and bureaucrats (bugyōnin) as a way to put pressure on the warriors. But even this was ineffective as the hired hands had to negotiate with the warriors.

=== Shugo and public lands (kokugaryo) ===
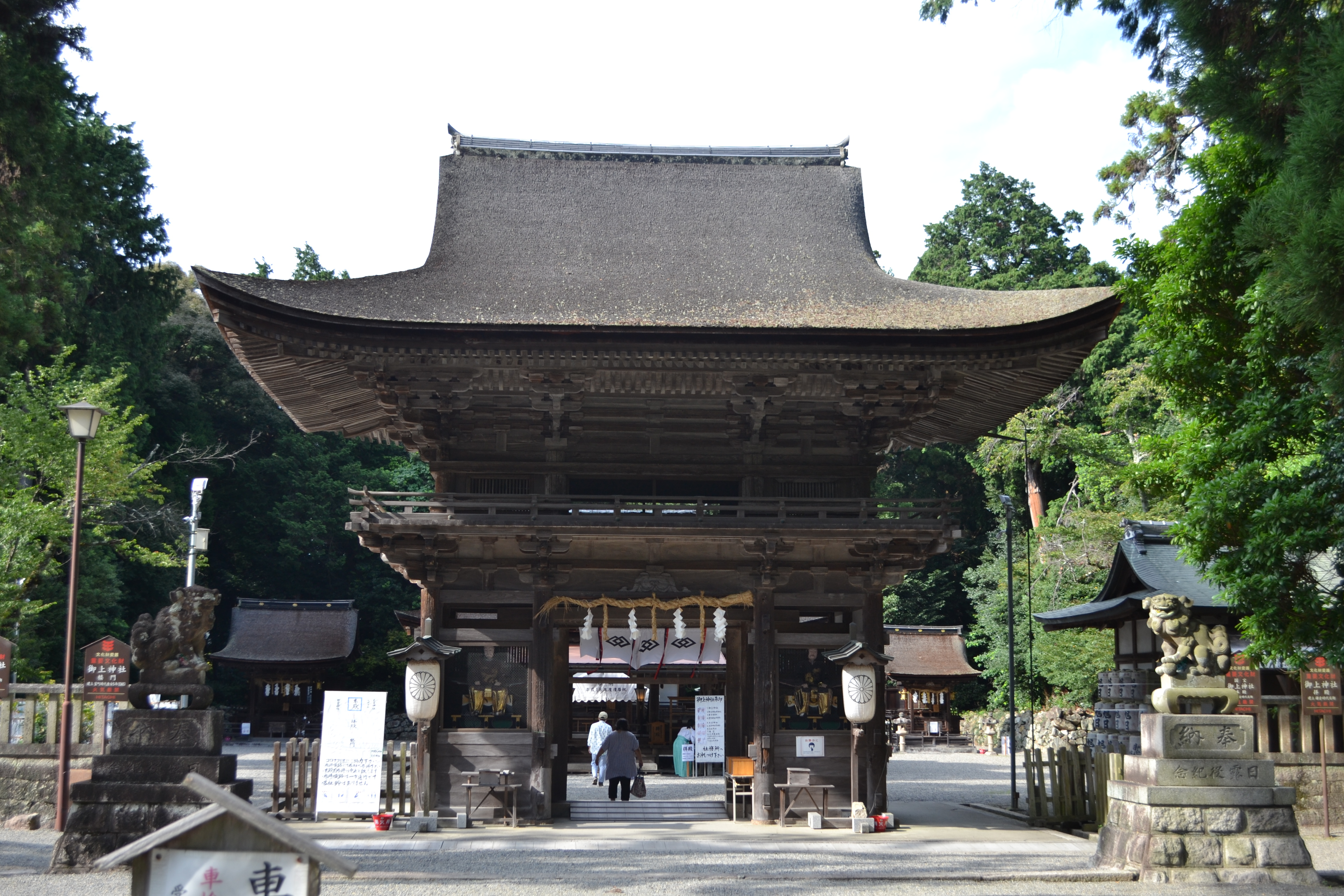
The gate at Mikami Shrine, 14th century

A largely missing picture until recently, was the fate of public lands (kokugaryo) during the Muromachi period, and the role of the shugo lords in their encroachment on them. Public lands (kokugaryo) during the Heian period were distinguished from private lands of the estates (shōen), because the latter were immune from state taxation. Before the rise of private estates, the only kind of lands were public lands maintained under the old civil administration. With the rise of private estates called shōen, during the Heian period, public lands by no means disappeared: in details, the public lands differed very little from private estates. Both were owned by absentee proprietors. They differed only in terms of administration: private estates were directly managed by noble officials, whereas, public lands were managed by the civil governors (kokuga or kokushi) on behalf of the former.

By the Kamakura period, public lands were owned by different landowners as private holdings (chigyo). These landowners included noble houses, religious establishments and warriors. Whole areas of the Kantō and the northeast were held by warriors not in the capacity as estate managers, but as private holdings. Kantō provinces were granted to the Kamakura regime as private lands (chigyokoku). The Ashikaga regime inherited these lands, and decided, fatefully, to place shugo lords over them.

One of the main functions of the civil governor's office (kokushi) was the oversight of criminal justice in the provinces, and the maintenance of the private holdings within the public lands (kokugaryo), but his function began to change with the advent of the Kamakura regime. With the appointment of shugo constables by Kamakura, all criminal jurisdiction within the provinces passed into his hands. But the civil governor (kokushi) remained as the key officer in the civil administration (ritsuryo), who made sure that rent from private holdings reached the absentee nobles and religious establishments (jisha honjo) in Kyoto and in Yamashiro province. His oversight did not include the private holdings of warriors, most usually concentrated in the Kantō and further north.

With the outbreak of the Nanboku-chō War, the civil administration (ritsuryo) began to break down rapidly, and shugo lords, who had a minor role in provincial governance during the Kamakura period, emerged to usurp the civil governor's functions. This did not happen immediately in every province, but occurred without interruption until the shugo lords had become true governors over public lands. As they took over the oversight of private holdings within public lands, they established ties to many kinds of landowners: nobles, samurai of various kinds (kokujin, jizamurai), and to religious establishments. They enfeoffed their own followers on these lands, and reconfirmed the lands of existing samurai in exchange for military service, and established shugo contracts with the nobles with predictable results. Along with vassalage ties to local samurai (kokujin) on the estates, vassalage ties on public lands became a key resource that augmented the power of the shugo lords.

Furthermore, in 1346, ten years after the emergence of the Muromachi regime, the shōgun decentralized authority by giving the shugo the right to judge cases of crop stealing on the estates, and to make temporary assignments of land to deserving vassals taken from the imperialist forces. This was significant, insofar as traditional areas of Kamakura jurisdiction were "given up" by the Muromachi regime. Previously, all cases of crop stealing or land assignments were strictly under Kamakura administration. Also, about this time, the imperialist forces were suffering their worst defeats, opening up enemy land for confiscation and reassignment. By giving these new jurisdictions to the shugo lords, it further augmented their position as governors over their assigned provinces.

=== Legitimation and limits to power ===
In this dual capacity, the shugo lords had to compete with other landed samurai in the provinces for land they administered as governors, but did not personally own. Like the noble proprietors, a single shugo lord owned lands in widely dispersed areas in several provinces. His power was not built upon personal ownership of land like the territorial lords (daimyō) of the sixteenth century, but upon the loyalties of the local samurai through ties of vassalage. There was much greater coercive potential exercised by the territorial lords of the sixteenth century, because their ties of vassalage were based on their ownership of the lands around them: as owners they could dispense with the land as they saw fit, getting rid of recalcitrant vassals without much ado. In the fourteenth century, the shugo lords could not claim province wide ownership of territory: first, the concept of personal provincial ownership was as yet undeveloped; second, they never amassed large amounts of personal property, relying rather on using the traditional framework of estate lands and public lands to enfeoff their vassals. This is the central enigma of the fourteenth century: the fragmentation and dissolution of the estate system, and the disappearance of the civil administration coincided with the proliferation of private lands, but the external framework of the estate system (shōen) and the public lands system (kokugaryo), though devoid of content, still remained. Given the fragmentation, it was the intermediary ties of shugo vassalage, and the shugo role as provincial governor, that helped to integrate the disparate forces to some degree.

It becomes a wonder how the estate system survived at all given the depredations it suffered at the hands of the warriors. There were two reasons why it survived in the attenuated form described above: one, was the existence of the Muromachi regime that consistently upheld the estate system in the face of warrior incursions. As described earlier, Ashikaga Takauji tried to make sure that the limits set on the warriors by the half-tax measure was not exceeded, but he failed to circumvent arrangements like the shugo contract that really denuded the noble of his estate and its income. The half-tax measure itself did not protect the noble from the outright takeover of the estate at the hands of the samurai, even if the latter were required to hand over a portion to fulfill the half-tax law. In the end, it was the Muromachi administration that made sure that the samurai paid their portion of income to the nobles.

The other reason behind the survival of the estate system was connected to the legitimacy of the noble class. The rise of the warriors was not popular among the farmers living on the estates. The more gentle hand of the nobles was also the hand the people came to respect. To prevent outright disobedience and rebellion among the populace was one reason why both shugo lords and kokujin came to respect the outward form of the estate structure. To make their rulership legitimate in the eyes of the farmers, the warriors worked within the framework of the estate structure, even though this structure had been totally altered. A case can be made that the estate system, outside of Yamashiro province, had become eroded to such an extent that the nobles had little if any influence left in the provinces.

== Consolidation of power: 1360–1370 ==
Niō of Kinpusen-ji Temple
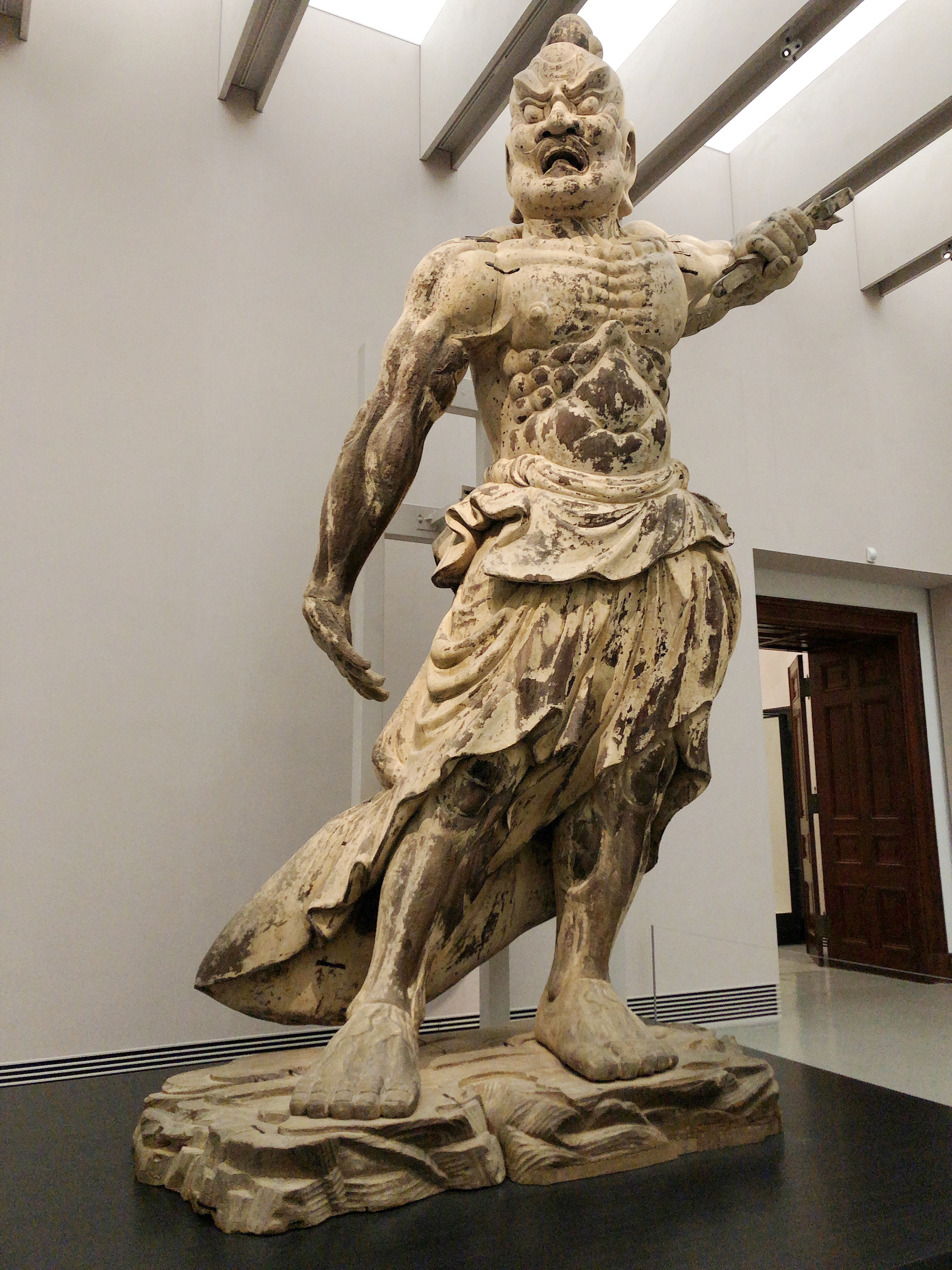
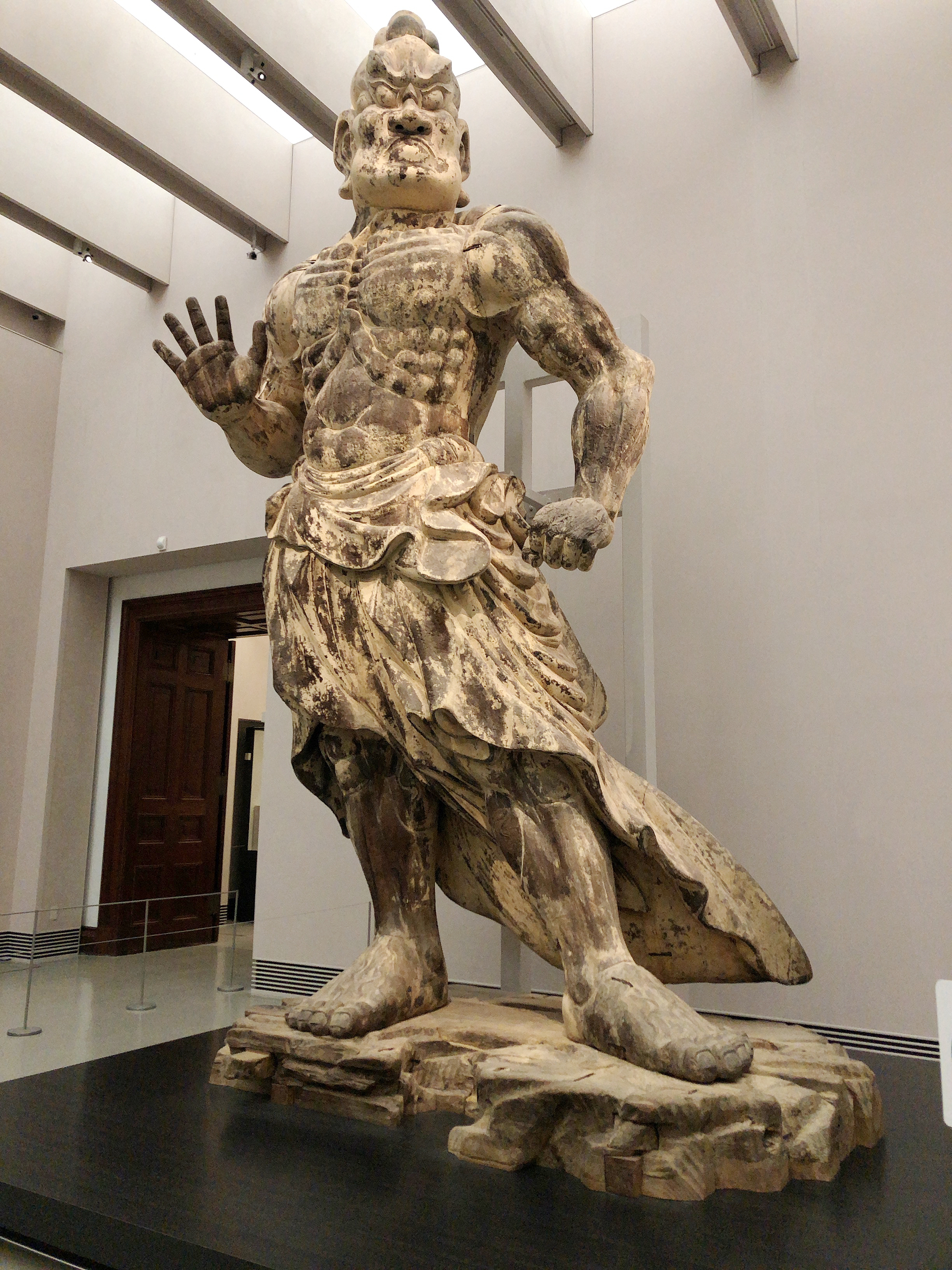
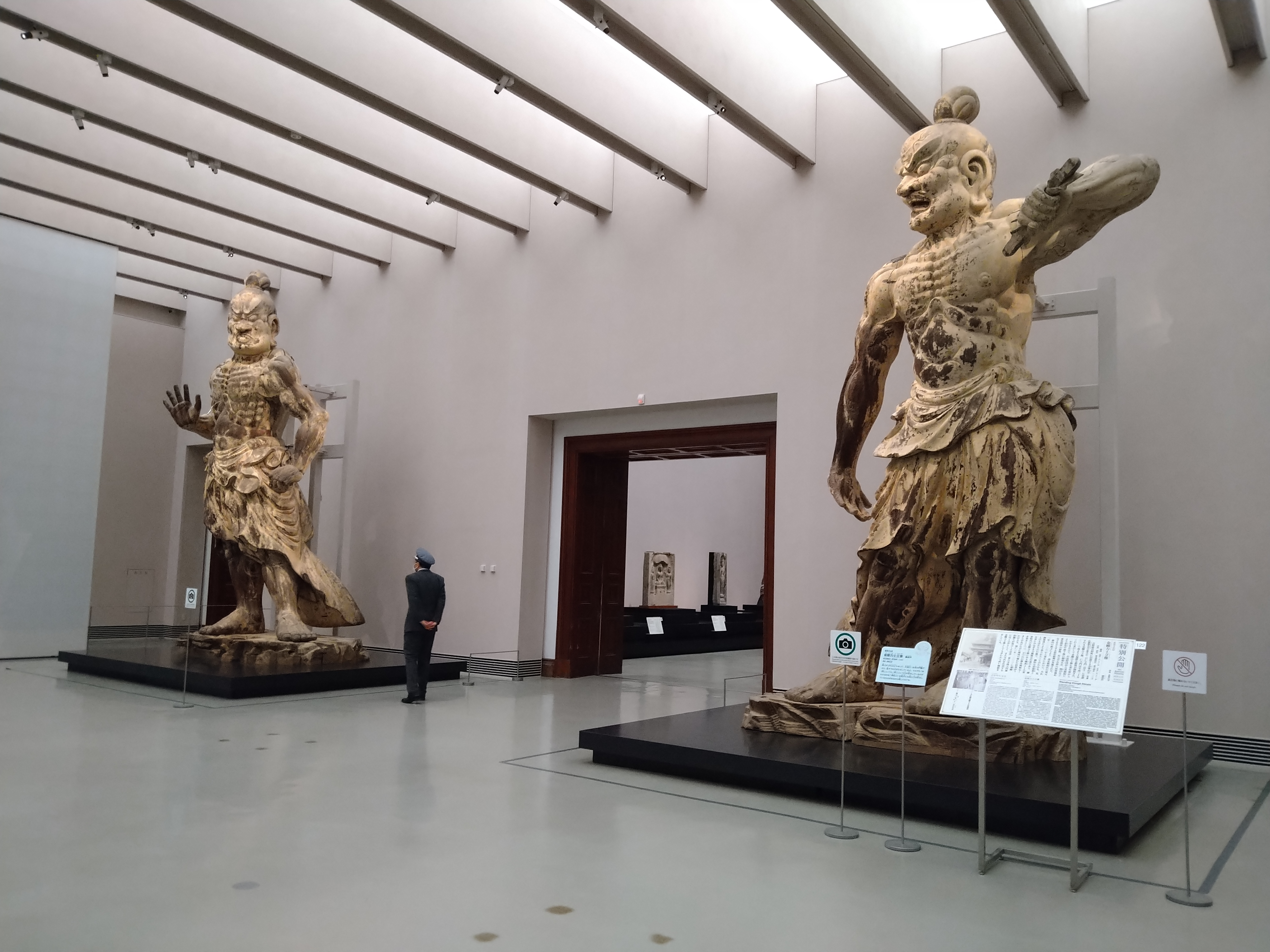
Large niō guardian statues from Kinpusen-ji temple, made in 1339 by the sculptor Kōjō (康成)

In 1358 after the death of Takauji, the shogunate passed to his son Yoshiakira. Under his leadership, and that of the kanrei Hosokawa Yoriyuki's, the regime succeeded in integrating the shugo lords in the 1360s and 1370s. Shugo branch families of the Ashikaga were now employed within the government bureaucracy. This happened due to the emergence of the kanrei council system which tied shugo lords firmly to the regime. Shogunal hegemony was now also stronger and this allowed them to discipline errant shugo lords. Furthermore, the effects of the half-tax decree of 1368; the court ranking system which tied the shogunate closer to the imperial court; and limitations to Muromachi authority in the Kyūshū and Kantō regions all served to push the consolidation of Muromachi power.

To mend relations after the Kannō Incident, Yoshiakira reorganized the regime by establishing the kanrei council system in 1362. This system was made up of two components, the kanrei office and the senior vassal council (jushin kaigi) over which the kanrei presided. The system involved the most powerful shugo families as participants in directly governing central and western Japan. Along with the shōgun, the kanrei council emerged to form the heart of the Muromachi regime to such an extent that historians have come to characterize this regime as the bakufu-shugo system.

=== The kanrei council ===
The very conflict that emerged with the Kannō Incident was caused due to the separation and clash between the military vassal institutions controlled by Takauji and the bureaucratic-judicial institutions controlled by Tadayoshi. With the emergence of the kanrei council system, the shugo lords who represented the military were tied firmly to the bureaucracy.

The job of the kanrei was to act as a spokesman between the Senior Vassal Council (jushin kaigi) and the shōgun. The kanrei also had the responsibility of looking over the bureaucratic elements of the regime on a daily basis, consulting and transmitting shogunal orders to the council and to the bureaucracy. In this system, regime policy was formulated in consultations between the council and the shōgun, though final decisions were made by the latter.

The kanrei was consistently selected from a hereditary group of three shugo families related to Takauji within four generations (Papinot 1972:27): the Hosokawa, the Hatakeyama and the Shiba. The three families took turns in filling the post. They were the highest ranking shugo families in the regime. In the beginning, the council was composed of the heads of these three shugo families along with four other heads of powerful shugo families: the Yamana, the Isshiki, the Akamatsu and the Kyōgoku. The latter two families were unrelated to the Ashikaga family. This trend of including unrelated shugo families into the council continued with the recruitment of the Ouchi, the Sasaki and the Toki families in the next few decades. This trend indicates that powerful shugo families, irrespective of kinship, were tied to the regime. Conflicts of interests between shugo lords and the shōgun was institutionalized by letting the shugo lords voice their opinions in discussions within the council.

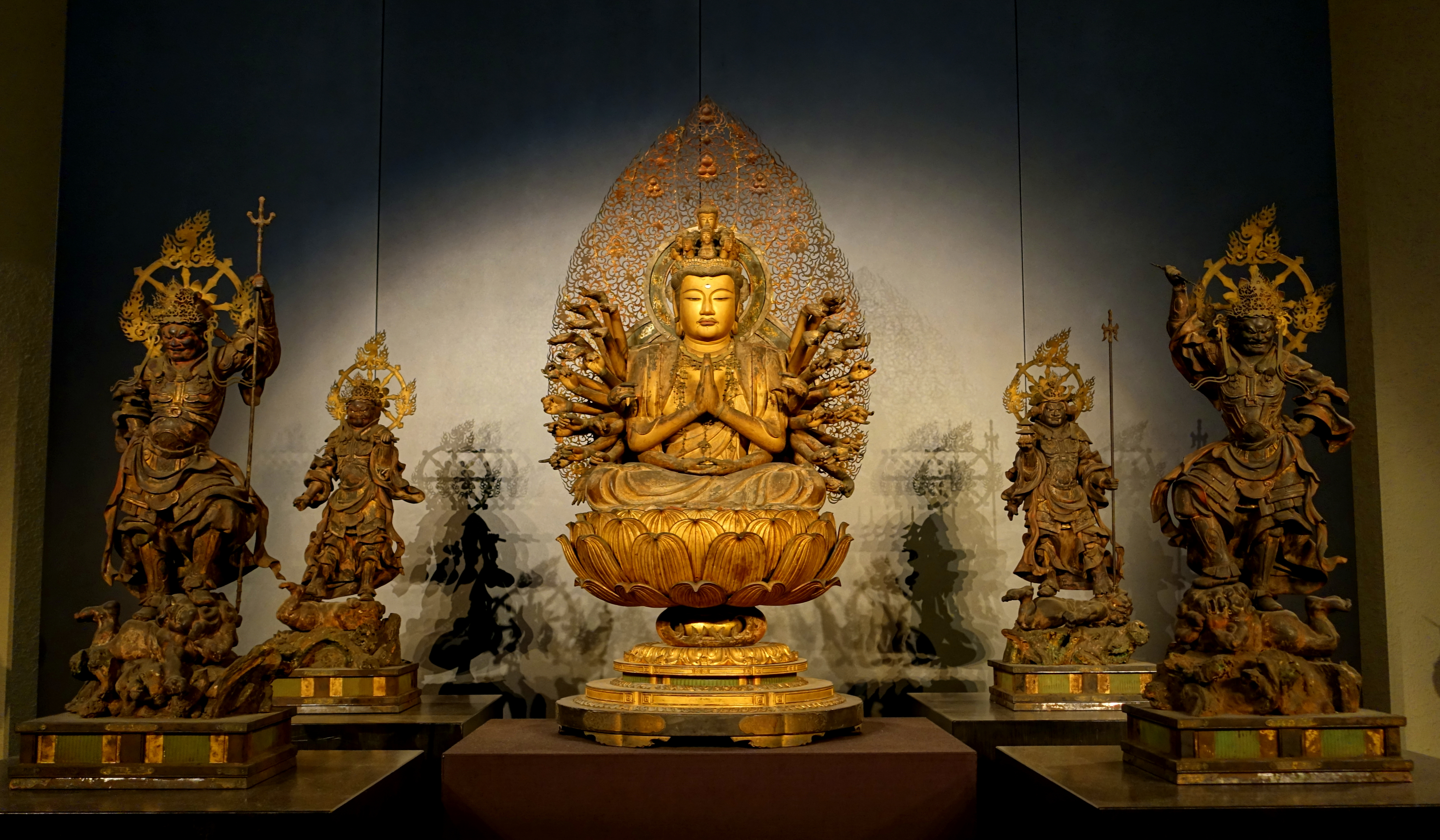
Sculptures of Thousand-armed Avalokitesvara and the Four Heavenly Kings, 14th century

The Board of Retainers (samuraidokoro) was also headed by a Senior Vassal Council member selected in the 14th century from among the Imagawa (who became a council member a little later), the Hosokawa, the Hatakeyama, the Shiba, and the Toki. The Board of Retainers had the responsibility over police functions and the execution of criminal justice in Kyoto. The office holder automatically became the shugo over Yamashiro province, the wealthiest and most densely populated in Japan, and had the responsibility of protecting the regime headquarters and Kyoto. By the beginning of the 15th century, the head of the Board of Retainers was chosen from among four shugo families: the Yamana, the Akamatsu, the Kyogoku, and the Isshiki.

Shugo participation in the Senior Vassal Council and in the Board of Retainers were important because it was through the use of these intermediary instruments whereby the Ashikaga shōguns were able to centralize the state under their direction. Kinship in the form of headship ties (soryo), looms large as a recruiting mechanism, here too, the shugo lords were mostly branch families of the Ashikaga. However, these kinship ties did little in the way of mediating between the semi-independent shugo lords and the regime. It was rather the effective participation of the shugo lords in governing through the kanrei council system which bound their interests more firmly than before to the regime.

=== Ashikaga and shugo coalitions ===
In 1362, the two most powerful shugo houses in the country, the Ouchi and the Yamana, submitted themselves to the Ashikaga regime on condition that the shōgun would not interfere with the internal affairs of their respective provinces (Grossberg 1981:25). Subsequently, the Yamana, who were related to the Ashikaga, and the Ouchi, who were not, began to play an increasingly important role in government affairs. However, within a few decades, both shugo houses became powerful enough to incur the wrath of the shōgun.

In 1366, the first kanrei office holder's father, Shiba Takatsune who held real power over his thirteen-year-old son, and who engineered the placement of Shiba family members in key government offices was declared a traitor, because of his growing power and arrogance (he felt demeaned by accepting the kanrei post, so he had his son appointed instead). In the first show of force against an important shugo family, Yoshiakira ordered the Yamana, Sasaki, Yoshimi and the Toki shugo lords to attack the Shiba in the province of Echizen. The Shiba were defeated, and their territory in Echizen was redistributed. In 1367, following the ouster of the Shiba family, Hosokawa Yoriyuki was named as the successor to the post of kanrei: after the shōgun Yoshiakira's death, Yoriyuki managed during the minority of the young shōgun Yoshimitsu to place the regime on a firmer foundation.

The use of shugo lords to attack one of their own colleagues in the 1366 points to the growing authority of the shōgun, compared to the shugo lords. Up until then, there was no true punitive mechanisms that the shōgun could use against his shugo lords. Pitting one shugo lord against another strengthened the shōgun's hand.

In 1362, the last Southern Court offensive against Kyoto forced the Ashikaga to withdraw from the capital, but like many previous attempts, the imperialists had to eventually retreat in the face of a large counterattack without having accomplished anything. The exuberance that existed during the 1350s among the imperialist armies had faded. Resistance after this date became sporadic and completely defensive. Finally, in 1369, a year after the death of Emperor Go-Murakami, the stalwart imperialist general Kusunoki Masanori submitted to the regime. His capitulation ended the imperialist threat to the central provinces.

=== Imperial legitimation ===
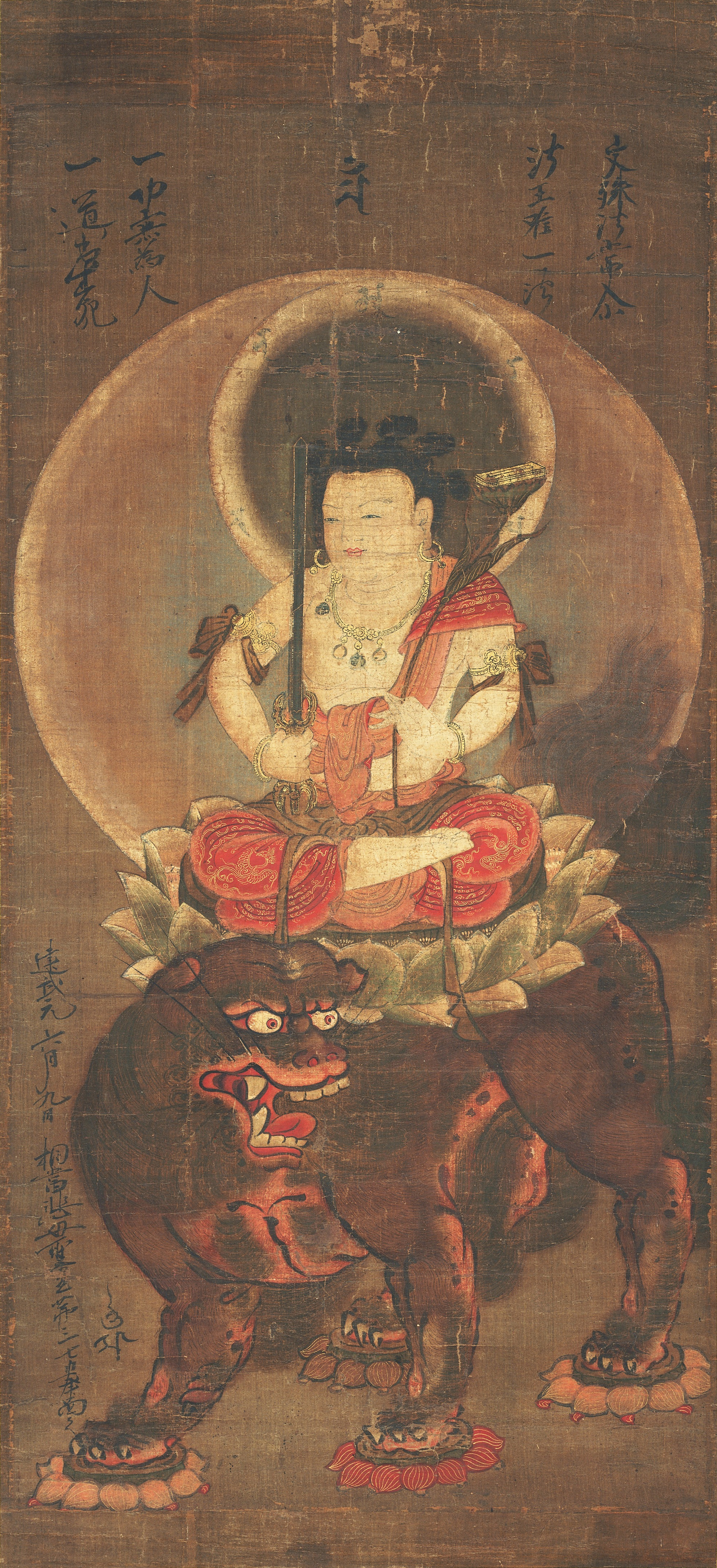
Silk painting of Manjusri by Kōshin, 1339

In 1370, Imagawa Sadayo (Ryoshun) was appointed by the kanrei Yoriyuki and the Senior Vassal Council to bring down the last bastion of Southern Court resistance in Kyūshū. After a grueling twelve-year campaign, imperialist resistance collapsed with the defeat of the Kikuchi clan in 1381; and with the death of Shimazu Ujihisa in 1385, the last Kyūshū provincial domain declared its allegiance to the regime. With the fall of Kyūshū the whole of western Japan came under the rule of the Ashikaga regime. However, campaigns alone were inadequate to legitimize Ashikaga rule over the nobles.

After 1367, during the minority of the shōgun Yoshimitsu, the kanrei Hosokawa Yoriyuki became active in trying to legitimize the regime from the point of view of the nobles. He did this through a series of extremely conservative measures, gaining prestige among the nobles in Kyoto. He used an ancient court ranking system by having the young shōgun participate in it. He also associated the regime with the court much more closely than had any other previous warrior leader. By doing this, he tied the regime closer to the imperial court, thereby erasing the stigma of the ideology that fueled the Nanboku-chō conflict: Ashikaga Takauji was seen as a traitor fighting against the restoration of imperial power.

The court society survived such a long time because of its popularity among the different classes in Japanese society. On the estate level, farmers felt much closer to the nobles than towards the warriors. The waning power of the nobles notwithstanding, their influence went far beyond their actual power, because they possessed a legitimacy of tradition and the charisma of culture that the warriors did not possess. This was why Yoriyuki had the young shōgun participate in court ceremonies: the participation involved the highest military leader in a court ranking system that dated back several centuries, and had as its premise the primacy of the imperial line over everyone, including the warriors, who had to receive titles from the emperor. By participating in this court ranking ritual, the Ashikaga regime was sending a strong message to the entire society: that the legitimacy conferred by the court was still valid and still important. This participation bridged the tensions between the warrior regime and the court, and had the unintended effect of disseminating court culture among the warrior class. The warriors themselves were attracted to the culture of the nobles, and emulated the latter's tastes such as being involved with constructing Zen rock gardens. The connection effected between the shōgun and the imperial court during the late 14th century, had the effect of broadening the legitimacy of the shōgun's power.

The kanrei Yoriyuki promulgated the last half-tax decree (hanzei) in 1368. This decree tied noble interests to the regime: it outlawed the halving of lands owned by the imperial family (lands under the control of major temples) and those that were owned by the imperial regents (the Fujiwara). Exceptions included noble lands that were given full title by the previous shōgun, and estates managed by the samurai stewards (jitō). This decree was applicable to all estates nationwide, and led to deter further samurai incursions onto the estates, and to defend the interests of the nobles in the face of samurai incursions. Unlike the earlier half-tax decrees, this one was conservative, and its aim was to protect noble lands from division rather than to justify it.

The realities of samurai incursions that had already taken place could not be reversed. What was ideologically stated openly departed from what was actually taking place in the provinces. The incursions of the samurai and the shugo lords on the estates were severe despite the 1368 decree. And with the 15th century, this trend of land-grabbing became ever more pronounced. The Ashikaga shōguns were not able to stop the incursions on the estates. However ineffective, the 1368 decree recognized noble interests and were defended ideologically by a warrior regime, and in the process tied together the interests of both.

The direct rule of the Muromachi regime that emerged in the 1360s was limited geographically to the western and central provinces, unlike how the previous Kamakura regime was based in the Kantō region. Outside shugo lords (tozama) unrelated to the Ashikaga like the Takeda, Chiba, Yuki, Satake, Oyama, Utsunomiya, Shoni, Otomo, Aso, and the Shimazu families, all of whom were concentrated in or near the Kantō and Kyūshū regions, did not participate in the kanrei council system, and were semi-independent of the regime. They were tacitly recognized and given shugo titles by the Ashikaga, because of their predominant positions in areas that were not easily controlled from Kyoto.

=== Kyūshū ===
After the Kyūshū campaign that began in 1370, the Kyūshū deputy (tandai) became the representative of the Muromachi regime on that island. Imagawa Sadayo (Ryoshun) effectively prosecuted the campaign against the Southern Court forces and on Shimazu Ujihisa. Deputies like Sadayo were Muromachi representatives, even when they arrogated the full powers of vassalage to local samurai. For example, in 1377, a contract was signed between Sadayo and a samurai alliance (ikki) consisting of sixty-one local samurai. The contract stipulated that all disputes between alliance members would be taken to the Kyūshū deputy, while disputes between alliance members and the deputy himself would be taken to the Muromachi regime in Kyoto (Harrington 1985:87). The deputy united both the interests of the regime and of the local area. It was a precarious position because of the temptation to independence it presented. However, the Muromachi regime did not extend their direct control over the entirety of their domain, and so came to rely on appointees to influence the shugo lords and samurai.

=== Kantō ===
In the late 14th century, the Kantō region was dominated by powerful warrior families. Of these, the Uesugi were the most powerful. They were able to take advantage of the fighting that erupted between families in the region to advance their own interests. In 1368, the Utsunomiya family revolted against the Kamakura headquarters of the Muromachi regime, because they had lost their shugo posts to the Uesugi. The Uesugi was able to extend their influence by amassing shugo posts and by enfeoffing vassals at the expense of other families.

The Kamakura headquarters were where the regime could demand orders in the region. Increasingly, the headquarters became independent from the regime, and it then took care of regional disputes, regional taxation, and developed ties with shugo lords with minimal involvement from the regime in Kyoto—even though it was Kyoto's de jure right to confirm fiefs and ratify shugo appointments.

== Centralization of power: 1379–1399 ==
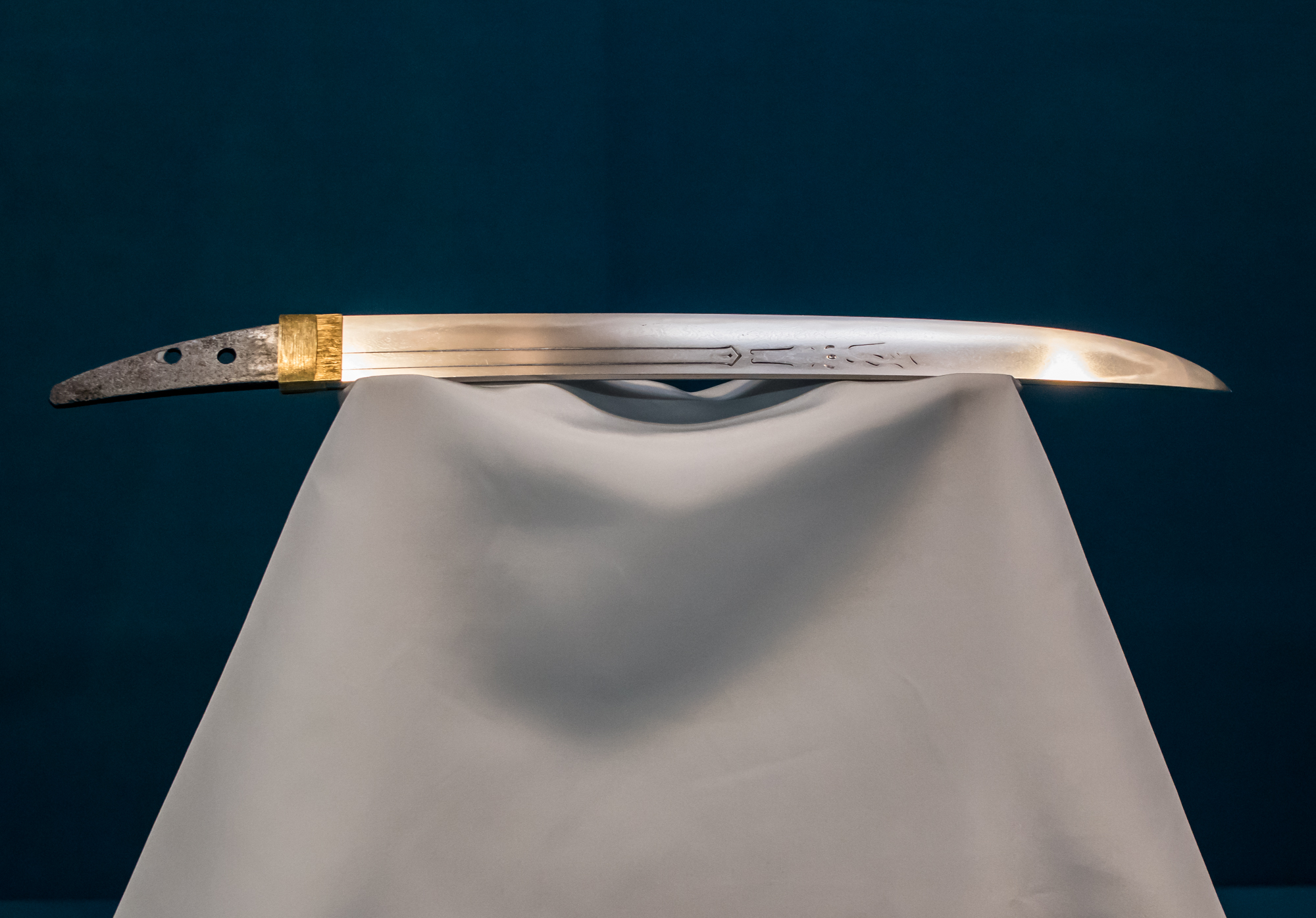
The "Ishida Sadamune", a tantō dagger forged by Hikoshiro Sadamune, 14th century

One area of resistance after another fell to the Muromachi regime during the crucial decade of the 1360s. Powerful shugo lords like the Ouchi and the Yamana submitted themselves as semi-independent lords; Southern Court resistance became more futile as time passed. Militarily the regime was able to call upon the services of the shugo lords to attack one of their own colleagues in 1366, pointing to the increasing subordination of the shugo to shogunal control. Hand in hand with the creation of the kanrei council system and the increasing participation of the powerful shugo families in the bakufu bureaucracy as well as closer ties to the imperial court broadened the legitimate base of the regime. Development of the shogunal army, and the use of commercial/agrarian revenue and taxes by the regime also contributed to the stronger centralization of power by the shogun.

As the Shogun tightened his control over Kyushu and the powerful Yamana clan, he turned his attention to dealing with the Southern Court. In 1392 Ashikaga Yoshimitsu persuaded the weakened Southern Court emperor Go-Kameyama to surrender the Imperial regalia in exchange for an agreement to alternate succession between the Northern and Southern lines. The Northern line reneged on the agreement in 1412 without any objections from the Shogun, and Go-Kameyama withdrew into solitary life before dying in 1424.

However, geographically, the Muromachi regime was limited in scope, delegating its jurisdiction of the Kantō and Kyūshū areas to regional representatives, holding more or less direct control only over the central and western provinces of Honshū. For fifty years after Yoshimitsu's assumption of authority in 1379, the Muromachi regime entered its most powerful phase as the unrivaled government of Japan.

=== The Ashikaga and the Imperial Court ===
Under Yoshimitsu (f. 1379–1408) who took the reins of power after the dismissal of Yoriyuki as kanrei, the architectural and cultural forms that have since characterised Japanese culture matured. His close association with the imperial court and its culture, and his patronage of the new arts helped to disseminate this culture to the military aristocracy and the shugo lords. This connection between the shōgun and the imperial court brought added prestige to both institutions, and gave the shōgun an aura of civil legitimacy and culture that the previous Kamakura regime had lacked and that was denied to the warriors.

=== Compulsory residence policy ===
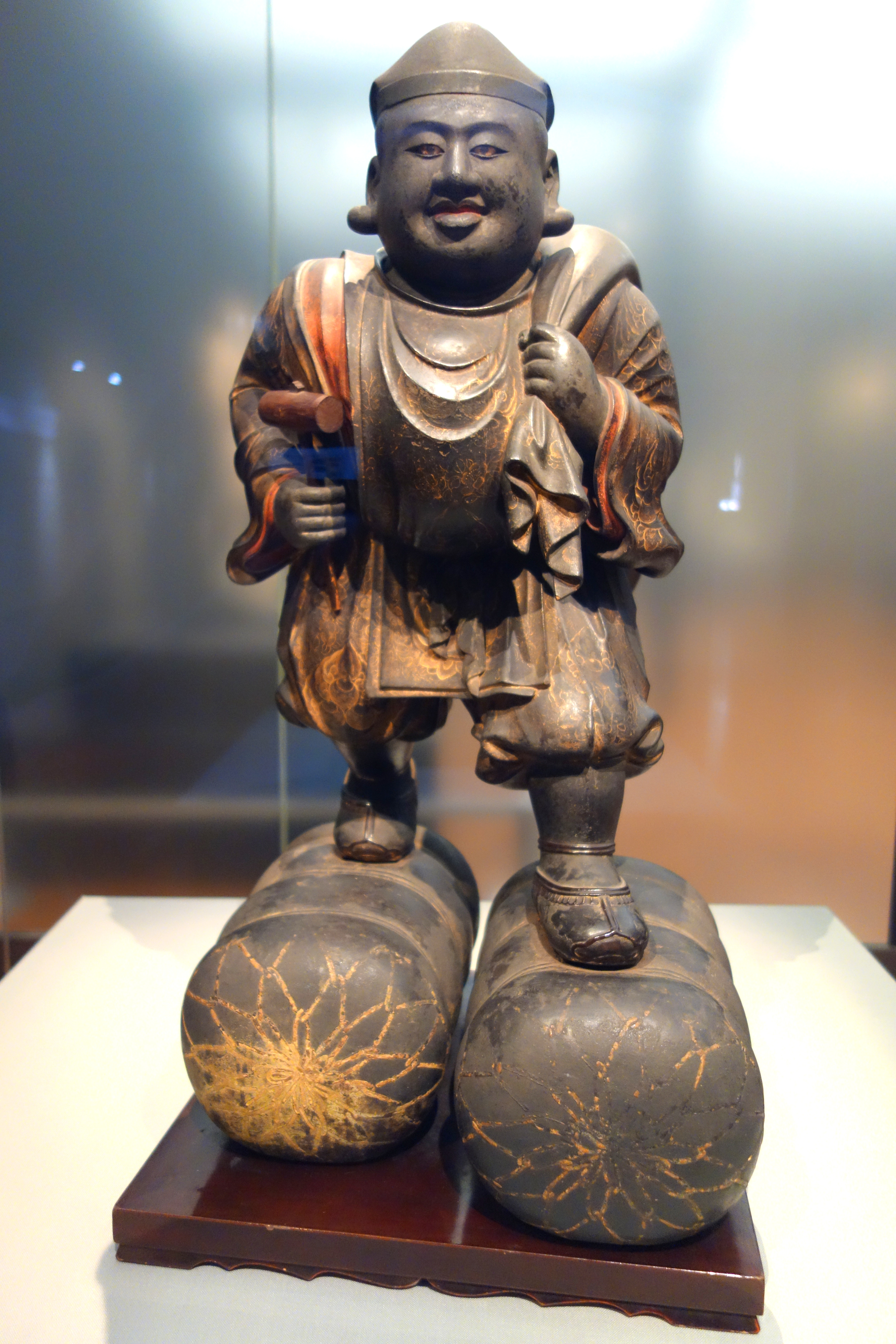
Sculpture of Mahakala by Kaiken, dated 1347

In the 1380s the kanrei council system was strengthened by Yoshimitsu when he persuaded the western and central shugo lords to take up residence in Kyoto. He even went to visit Ouchi Yoshihiro in 1389, and persuaded him to live in Kyoto during one of his so-called pilgrimage circuits (these circuits were used to display his power through the provinces in which he traveled). This policy enabled the shōgun to tighten his grip around the shugo lords. Permission to leave the capital city was rarely granted to the shugo lord, it was only granted after discussion in the Senior Vassal Council. Even when permission was granted in the case of provincial rebellion or Southern Court guerilla activity, suitable hostages were left behind in Kyoto. If the shugo lord left without permission, it was seen as tantamount to treason.

The Kantō and Kyūshū shugo were exempt from this order of compulsory residence in Kyoto. However, the Kamakura headquarters of the Muromachi regime instituted a similar policy in regards to the Kantō shugo lords, and made them establish mansions in Kamakura just as the western and central shugo lords made mansions in Kyoto. Mansion building in Kyoto became fashionable, and eventually included shugo lords like the Shimazu of Kyūshū, who decided to live in Kyoto even though he was not required to do so.

The shugo lords had little choice in the matter as they risk being branded a traitor. This residence policy saw the power of the shugo lords severely restricted as their freedom of movement was circumvented. Also by the second quarter of the 15th century, real power in the provinces moved away from the shugo lords and came to rest upon the deputy shugo (shugo-dai), and upon other independent samurai (kokujin) who resided in the provinces. Therefore, the policy was a long term disaster for the shugo lords. The hiring of deputy shugo was necessitated by the compulsory residential policy if the shugo lords were to maintain their power in the provinces. In the short term, hiring branch family members and samurai kokujin as deputy shugo, and using them as their own representatives in the provinces worked well; but in the long term, power passed from the hands of the shugo lords into the hands of those they hired.

=== The shogunal army ===
Yoshimitsu did not hesitate to use military force to reduce the shugo lords to obedience on the pretext that they had become too powerful. He assembled a new shogunal army (gobanshu) made up of five divisions totalling some 3,000 dependent on him. This force was a formidable array, particularly when they were augmented by contributions from other shugo lords. The shogunal army as a separate force connected the shōgun directly with his own vassals and was also made up of kokujin samurai. The shogunal army also served as a check on shugo forces. The first Ashikaga shōgun, Takauji, created ties with samurai stewards by enfeoffing them on estate lands. Throughout the early Muromachi period, this separate vassal hierarchy under the command of the shōgun was also an important check on shugo power.

The shogunal army had two components: the shogunal bodyguard (shin'eigun) which consisted of Ashikaga branch family members, shugo relatives and shugo branch family members, other sons and brothers of regime officials, and most importantly, powerful kokujin. Numbering (at most) 350 men, this group was a cohesive and loyal body, ready to defend the shōgun's person at any cost. Surrounding this small band was a number of direct vassals of the shōgun tracing its origins back to 1336, when Takauji enfeoffed many samurai as house vassals who were probably used as a reserve army. Arnesen calculated that the number of direct vassals in the shogunal bodyguard was 60% to 70% the number of direct vassals enrolled under the later Hōjō clan of the 16th century. And if the Later Hōjō were able to field 50,000 troops in the Odawara campaign, the shogunal bodyguard of 350 could easily have mobilized their own vassals to come up with the 3,000 troops that took part in the Meitoku Rising of 1391. The creation of the shogunal bodyguard, and the central position of this group over other shogunal vassals is what differentiates the shogunal army of Yoshimitsu from the shogunal vassals of Takauji. A tighter organization and esprit de corps emerged with the new shogunal army.

=== Shugo coalition as a force ===
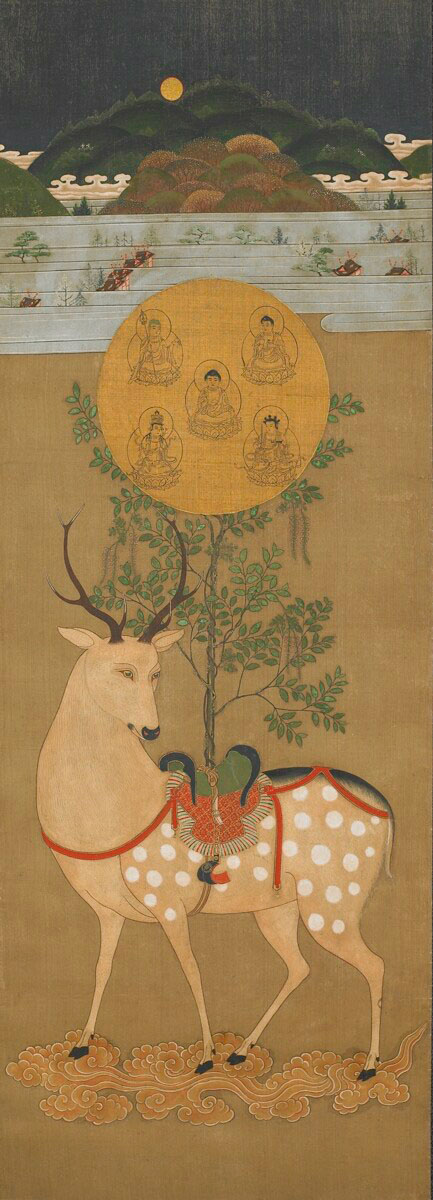
The deer mandala of Kasuga Grand Shrine, circa 1350

The shogunal army alone was not adequate to meet and defeat kanrei class shugo lords on the field of battle, but were perfectly suited to the kind of warfare Yoshimitsu practiced: pitting one shugo lord against a family member, and against other shugo lords. The new shogunal hegemony, that emerged under the previous shōgun, Yoshiakira, came to dominate the politics of Yoshimitsu. Shogunal prestige informally dictated that no single shugo lord should exceed a certain level of power without incurring the wrath of the shōgun. It was in the interest of the shugo lords themselves, that none of their own colleagues should become too powerful and dominant over the rest.

In pursuit of this policy in 1389 Yoshimitsu ordered Toki Yasuyuki, the shugo lord of the provinces of Mino, Ise and Owari to give up the latter province to a relative. Yasuyuki refused, and Yoshimitsu ordered the cousin of Yasuyuki, Toki Yorimasu, to attack him. After three years Yasuyuki was defeated, and the province of Mino was given to Yorimasu in 1391. To Yoshimitsu it did not matter whether the province that was given up was Mino or Owari as long as Toki Yasuyuki was shorn of some of his power in the central provinces.

Before the Meitoku Rising of 1391, the Yamana clan possessed 11 provinces in western and central Japan which made them the most powerful shugo family in the country. Yoshimitsu looked for an excuse to attack them; and when Yamana Mitsuyuki (who was shugo over the provinces of Izumo, Tanba, Hoki, and Oki) took possession of some estates belonging to the imperial family in Izumo, Yoshimitsu recalled the ex-kanrei Hosokawa Yoriyuki to plan a campaign against Mitsuyuki. The Yamana shugo lords Mitsuyuki and Ujikiyo attacked Kyoto, but were severely defeated by the shogunal army in concert with the forces of Ouchi Yoshihiro. The other shugo contingents that made up the shōgun's forces numbered no more than 300 horsemen each. After the campaign, the Yamana were assigned only two provinces, Tajima and Hoki, Ujikiyo was killed in battle while Mitsuyuki died through assassination in 1395.

This pitting of one shugo lord against another reached a head in 1399. Ironically, this time the target was Ouchi Yoshihiro, who had served the regime well in the campaign against the Yamana. Yoshihiro was ordered to attack the Shoni in 1397 which he did, losing his brother in the process. He later learned of the Byzantine duplicity of Yoshimitsu: Shoni was also ordered to attack the Ouchi. Angered by this duplicity, and fearing for his life when the shōgun summoned him to Kyoto, he opted to disobey, which led him to be declared an enemy of the regime. At the battle of Sakai, Yoshimitsu along with the forces of five shugo lords, the Hosokawa, Akamatsu, Kyogoku, Shiba, and the Hatakeyama, overwhelmed Yoshihiro's defensive works by setting fire to the city. The allied force led by Yoshimitsu numbered 30,000 warriors against Ouchi's 5,000; Yoshihiro was overwhelmed in battle and he committed suicide.

As each of these previous examples illustrate, shogunal hegemony became very effective. It was used to divide the shugo lords by making them attack and destroy colleagues. Shogunal hegemony would not have succeeded without the cooperation of the shugo lords in uniting their forces with the shogunal army. However, without finances to support the shogunal army and other expenses of the regime, this coercive policy would have been unthinkable.

=== Sources of revenue ===
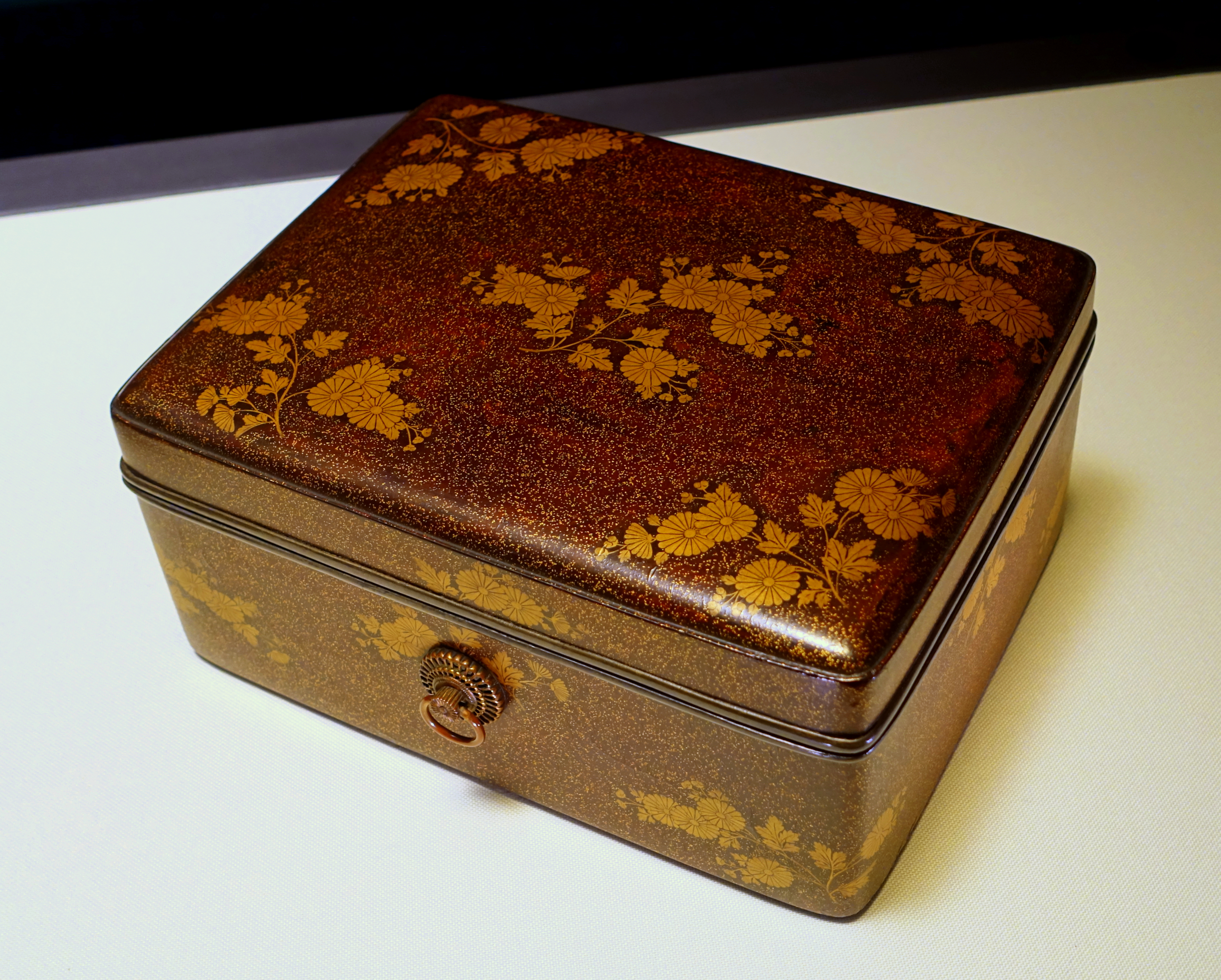
Lacquered box with chrysanthemum, 14th century

Kyoto in the late 14th and 15th centuries was a brilliant center for economic activity. With the compulsory residential policy that emerged under the shōgun Yoshimitsu, shugo lords with their vassals and servants added to the distinguished population of the city that included nobles, the imperial court and the Muromachi government. This translated into a vast market for a variety of goods and services that spurred the economic growth of the city. This growth was important to both the shōgun and shugo lords who lived in the capital as they tapped the wealth of the moneylenders (sakaya-doso) on a consistent basis, the shōgun even employed them as tax collectors in the city. What made the Muromachi regime so different from the previous Kamakura regime was the basis for its income; much of its revenue came from commercial taxes in addition to its landed base.

The Board of Administration (mandokoro) was used as a clearing house for matters concerning the revenue of the Muromachi regime. It was the chief bureaucratic organ that connected the regime to various commercial groups in the city for purposes of taxation. In 1393, the regime legalized its right to tax moneylenders directly. Commercial taxes assessed in Kyoto became the foundation for the new urban based Muromachi regime, and decisively changed the nature of the regime from one solely based on landed estates to a regime partly based on commerce.

Traditional agrarian based revenue came from three major sources: from shogunal estates, from shogunal vassals, and from taxes assessed against the shugo lords. The landed base of the Ashikaga shōguns was paltry compared to their successors, the Tokugawa; however, there were approximately 200 shogunal estates (goryosho) scattered between Kyoto and the Kantō region, and revenue extracted from these estates were significant. Moreover, the connection between the shogunal estates and the shogunal army was decisive: some of the men who served in the army were also managers over the shōgun's personal estates. Furthermore, many local samurai paid land taxes directly to the regime (kyosai) as one of the privileges they enjoyed as house vassals (gokenin), being immunized from shugo tax collectors in the process. In addition, shugo lords were taxed directly (shugo shussen) according to how many provinces they administered. This was assessed by the regime whenever there were buildings to be built or fixed, and when the shōgun needed cash for various projects.

The sources of revenue for the Muromachi regime were varied to a much greater extent than it was under the Kamakura regime due to the emerging market economy in Kyoto and Yamashiro province. It came in novel form as commercial revenue extracted from the moneylenders, a tax was assessed once the power structure of the Muromachi bureaucracy had effectively taken the city of Kyoto.

== Administration ==
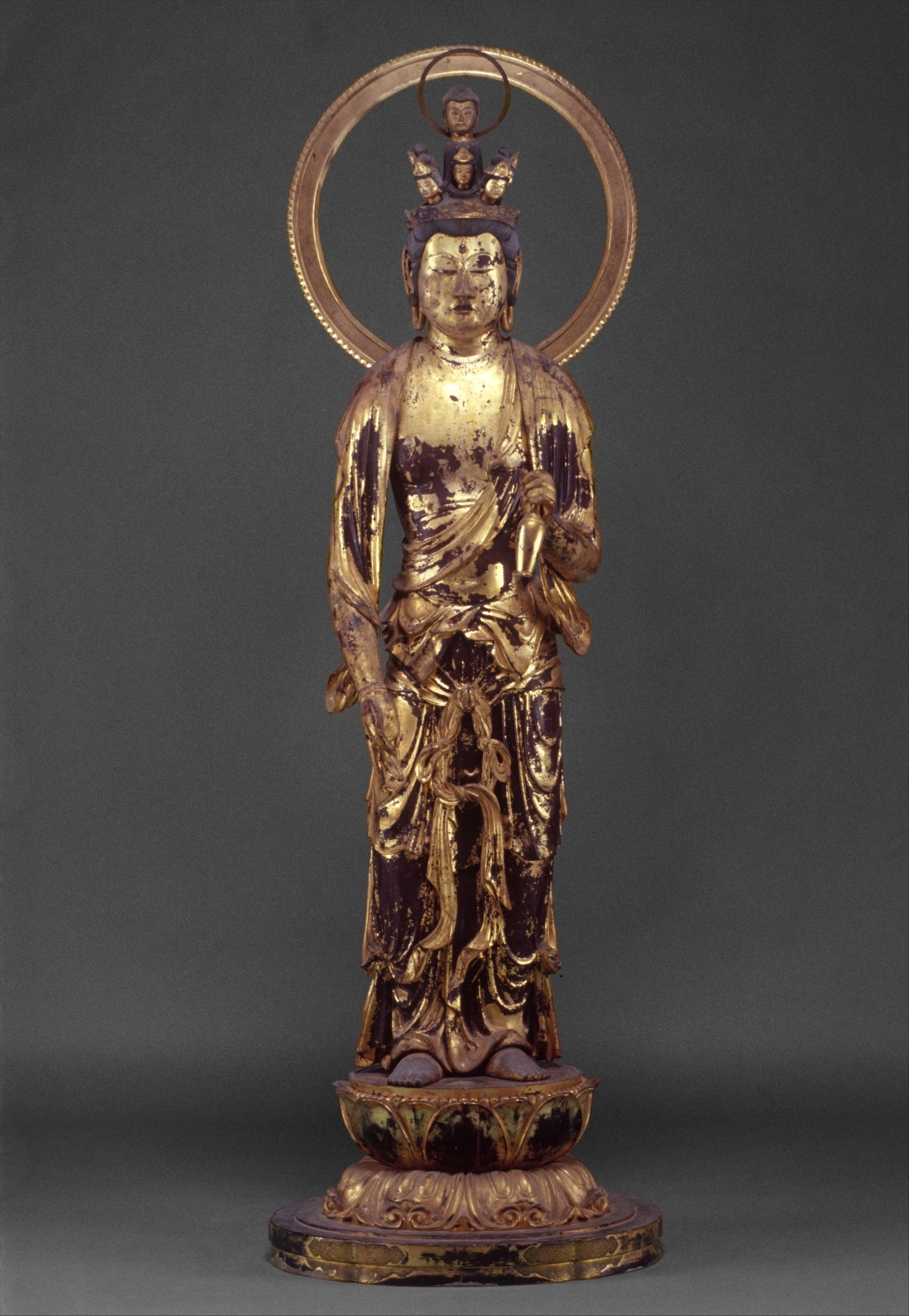
Sculpture of Eleven-headed Avalokitesvara, 14th century

Serious fighting between the two sides raged on for nearly 30 years before Ashikaga Takauji and his supporters gained the upper hand. He relied on three main policies to accomplish the task of assembling power:

1. Strengthening vassalage ties to samurai housemen (gokenin)
2. The use of shugo lords as bakufu governors and vassals in the provinces
3. The half-tax policy of dividing estate lands

Both the vassalage ties with the samurai and control over shugo lords were established after the regime had solidified in the 1350s. These two hierarchies were the most important connections in determining the shōgun's power.

The half-tax policy recognized the legality of samurai incursions on estate lands (shōen), but at the same time guaranteed the survival of the estate system.

=== Comparison with the Kamakura ===
In the Kamakura period, the vassalage ties between the samurai stewards (jitō) and the Kamakura regime (1185–1333) were intermediary, because they placed the jitō in a position where he was answerable directly to both the shōgun in Kamakura and the court nobles in Kyoto. The jitō can also be a shogunal houseman (gokenin) and a trusted vassal, and given the management of an estate that legally belonged to a noble in Kyoto. He was answerable to the shōgun in the form of military service and dues, but as a manager of an estate owned by a noble, he had to pay rent to the latter.

The stability of the Kamakura system rested upon the regime's guarantee of stewardship rights (jito shiki) to the dominant warriors, and of rent and land ownership rights to the noble proprietor. Through the vassalage ties to the jitō, the new warrior regime was grafted onto the older estate system, and in the process bridged the conflicting tendencies that existed between warriors and nobles. This Kamakura tradition was prestigious and it set the precedent for what followed in the Muromachi period.

Also during the Kamakura, Yoritomo and the Hōjō Regents were only concerned about controlling their own gokenin, consciously limiting themselves to hearing the land dispute cases of their own vassals and rewarding stewardship rights to their followers, letting other disputes from other groups to be taken care of by the civil administration. This precedent was followed by the Ashikaga shōguns as they protected the interests of their vassals against the incursions of the shugo lords throughout the Muromachi period.

The half-tax policy led the shugo to have more power as lords of the provinces and it divided estate lands which multiplied the number of fiefs owned by samurai warriors. This led to warrior interests predominating, but also preserved noble interests. In helping to preserve the estate system, the half-tax measure was a policy that still managed to connect the rights of the noble with those of the warrior.

The half-tax policy began as an emergency tax designated for military rations (hyororyosho) collected during wartime: half the income from a particular temple, shrine and estate lands in the provinces of Mino, Ōmi and Owari would be taken to support armies of the Muromachi regime. Increasingly, this was reinterpreted and changed by Takauji as the permanent acquisition of half of the land was now for the purpose of enfeoffing^{Note b} vassals.

=== Stronger vassalage ties ===
When the Nanboku-chō conflict broke out, vassalage ties became stronger between the shōgun and his vassals as a result of the need for military action against rivals. During the relatively peaceful Kamakura period, military skills were not as important as during the outbreak of civil war. Ties had to be strengthened or there was a risk of losing a potential warrior to the emerging shugo lords loyal to the Ashikaga clan or worst, by rival imperialist generals. These vassalage ties were used to bridge a potential conflict through the recruitment of warriors.

Several events depict the changing atmosphere of these vassalage ties. The Kobayakawa family became loyal vassals when they defended Ashikaga interests in Aki Province after Takauji retreated to Kyūshū in 1336. The Mōri clan became vassals of Takauji in 1336, and served under Kō Moroyasu until the outbreak of the Kannō Incident. In the 1350s, the Mori sided with the enemies of Takauji (Tadayoshi and his adopted son Tadafuyu) and not until the 1360s were they back again as vassals of the shōgun. Vassalage ties to the Kawashima clan and other warrior families near Kyoto were established by Takauji in the summer of 1336 in the latter's drive to retake the capital. The Kawashima exchanged military service for stewardship rights (jito shiki) to over half of Kawashima Estate, leaving the other half in possession of the noble proprietor in the form of rent.

== Legacy ==
Since the 19th century the Emperors of the Southern Imperial Court have been considered the legitimate Emperors of Japan. Factors contributing to their legitimacy were the Southern Court's control of the Japanese imperial regalia, and Kitabatake Chikafusa's work Jinnō Shōtōki, which legitimized the South's imperial court despite their defeat.

The consequences of events in this period continue to be influential in modern Japan's conventional view of the Tennō Seika (Emperor system). Under the influence of State Shinto, an Imperial decree dated March 3, 1911 established that the legitimate reigning monarchs of this period were the Southern Court. After World War II, a series of pretenders, starting with Kumazawa Hiromichi, claimed descent from the Southern Court and challenged the legitimacy of the modern imperial line, which is descended from the Northern Court.

== Southern Court emperors ==
- Emperor Go-Daigo (後醍醐天皇), (Takaharu, 尊治) : 1288–1339, r. 1318–1339

In late 1331, after his incitement of the Genkō War, Go-Daigo was exiled by the Kamakura shogunate but maintained his power as Emperor. He eventually escaped and reclaimed his throne in 1333, overthrowing the shogunate and the puppet Emperor in the process. Three years later, the newly-formed Ashikaga shogunate rebelled against his rule, effectively beginning the Northern and Southern Courts Period.

- Emperor Go-Murakami (後村上天皇), (Noriyoshi, 義良) : 1328–1368, r. 1339–1368

Go-Murakami briefly ruled as Emperor of all of Japan between 1351 and 1352, before the Kannō disturbance reignited tensions between the two opposing Courts once again.

- Emperor Chōkei (長慶天皇), (Yutanari, 寛成) : 1343–1394, r. 1368–1383
- Emperor Go-Kameyama (後亀山天皇), (Hironari, 熙成) : 1347–1424, r. 1383–1392

On November 19, 1392, Emperor Go-Kameyama renounced the Japanese Imperial Treasures to the Northern Court, effectively ending his lineage's claims to the Japanese throne.

== Northern Court emperors ==
Following the exile of Emperor Go-Daigo, the Kamakura shogunate hand-picked Kōgon of the Jimyōin line to rule Japan in October 1331.

- Emperor Kōgon (光嚴天皇), (Kazuhito, 量仁) : 1313–1364, r. 1331–1333

In July 1333, Kōgon was deposed as part of the Kenmu Restoration, which ultimately failed, resulting in his younger brother's exultation by the newly-formed Ashikaga shogunate in September 1336.

- Emperor Kōmyō (光明天皇), (Yutahito, 豊仁) : 1322–1380, r. 1336–1348
- Emperor Sukō (崇光天皇), (Masuhito, 益仁; later Okihito, 興仁) : 1334–1398, r. 1348–1351

In November 1351, Sukō was forced to abdicate, but following his capture during the Kannō disturbance, he was replaced by his younger brother as the new Ashikaga pretender in September 1352.

- Emperor Go-Kōgon (後光嚴天皇), (Iyahito, 彌仁) : 1338-1374, r. 1352-1371
- Emperor Go-En'yū (後圓融天皇), (Ohito, 緒仁) : 1359-1393, r. 1371-1382
- Emperor Go-Komatsu (後小松天皇), (Motohito, 幹仁) : 1377-1433, r. 1382-1412

According to the 1911 edict by Emperor Meiji, the reigns of the Northern Emperors are to be considered illegitimate. However, upon the Southern Court's renouncement of the Imperial Treasures in 1392, Emperor Go-Komatsu became the sole and legitimate claimant to the Chrysanthemum Throne, ruling as Emperor of all of Japan until his abdication in 1412.

== Explanatory footnotes ==
a.Shugo (守護?) was a title, commonly translated as "Governor", given to certain officials in feudal Japan. They were each appointed by the shōgun to oversee one or more of the provinces of Japan.
b.The verb "to enfeoff" is defined by the Random House Dictionary of the English Language as: "1) to invest with a freehold estate in land" and "2) to give as a fief".
c.The story of Tadayoshi's alleged plot to assassinate Moronao is part of the Taiheiki.

== General and cited references ==
- Arnesen, P. J. The Medieval Japanese Daimyo. New Haven: Yale University Press, 1979.
- Arnesen, P. J. "Provincial Vassals of the Muromachi Shoguns", in The Bakufu in Japanese History. Eds. Jeffrey P. Mass and William B. Hauser. Stanford: Stanford University Press, 1985.
- Brunner, G., "Legitimacy Doctrines and Legitimation Procedures in East European Systems." In Legitimation in Communist States. Ed. by T. H. Rigby and Ference Feber. New York: St. Martin's Press, 1982.
- Chan, H., Legitimation in Imperial China. Seattle: University of Washington Press, 1984.
- Elias, N. Power and Civility. Oxford: Basil Blackwell, 1982.
- Fenollosa, E. Epochs of Chinese & Japanese art: An outline history of East Asiatic design. Frederick A. Stokes, 1921
- Gay, S. "Muromachi Bakufu Rule in Kyoto: Administrative and Judicial Aspects", in The Bakufu in Japanese History. Eds. Jeffrey P. Mass and William B. Hauser. Stanford: Stanford University Press, 1985.
- Gay, S. "The Kawashima: Warrior-Peasants of Medieval Japan", in Harvard Journal of Asiatic Studies. 46 (June 1986), 81-119.
- Grossberg, K. Japan's Renaissance. Cambridge: Harvard University Press, 1981.
- Hall, John Whitney. Government and Local Power in Japan: 500-1700. Princeton: Princeton University Press, 1966.
- Harrington, L. F. "Regional Outposts of Muromachi Bakufu Rule: the Kanto and Kyushu", in The Bakufu in Japanese History. Eds. Jeffrey P. Mass and William B. Hauser. Stanford: Stanford University Press, 1985.
- Hori, K. "The Economic and Political Effects of the Mongol Wars", in Medieval Japan. Eds. John W. Hall and Jeffrey P. Mass. New Haven: Yale University Press, 1974.
- Kahane, R. Legitimation and Integration in Developing Societies. Boulder: Westview Press, 1982.
- Kawai, M. "Shogun and Shugo: the Provincial Aspects of Muromachi Politics", in Japan in the Muromachi Age. Eds. John W. Hall and Toyoda Takeshi. Berkeley: U.C. Press, 1977.
- Kierstead, T. E., "Fragmented Estates: the breakup of the Myo and the Decline of the Shoen System", in Monumenta Nipponica. 40 (Autumn 1985), 311–30.
- Lipset, S.M., "Social Conflict, Legitimacy, and Democracy." In Legitimacy and the State. Ed. by William Connolly. New York: New York University Press, 1984.
- Mass, Jeffrey P. "The Emergence of the Kamakura Bakufu", in Medieval Japan. Eds. John W. Hall and Jeffrey P. Mass. New Haven: Yale University Press, 1974.
- Mass, Jeffrey P. "Jito Land Possession in the Thirteenth Century: The Case of Shitaji Chubun", in Medieval Japan. Eds. John W. Hall and Jeffrey P. Mass. New Haven: Yale University Press, 1974.
- Mass, Jeffrey P. Lordship and Inheritance in Early Medieval Japan. Stanford: Stanford University Press, 1989.
- Mehl, Margaret. (1997). History and the State in Nineteenth-Century Japan.
- Miyagawa, M. "From Shoen to Chigyo: Proprietary Lordship and the Structure of Local Power", in Japan in the Muromachi Age. Eds. John W. Hall and Toyoda Takeshi. Berkeley: U.C. Press, 1977.
- Nagahara, K. "Village Communities and Daimyo Power", in Japan in the Muromachi Age. Eds. John W. Hall and Toyoda Takeshi. Berkeley: U.C. Press, 1977.
- Nagahara, K. "Shugo, Shugo Daimyo, Sengoku Daimyo", in Rekishi Koron, 8 (August 1982), 10–19.
- Papinot, Edmond. Historical and Geographical Dictionary of Japan. Tokyo: Tuttle, 1972.
- Sansom, George Bailey. A History of Japan: 1334-1615. Stanford: Stanford University Press, 1961.
- Sato, S. "The Ashikaga Shogun and the Muromachi Bakufu Administration", in Japan in the Muromachi Age. Eds. John W. Hall and Toyoda Takeshi. Berkeley: U.C. Press, 1977.
- Tanuma, M. "Muromachi Bakufu, Shugo, Kokujin", in Muromachi Bakufu. Nihon Rekishi, vol. 7. Tokyo: Iwanami Shoten, 1976.
- Varley, H. Paul. The Onin War. New York: Columbia University Press, 1967.
- Varley, H. Paul. Imperial Restoration in Medieval Japan. New York: Columbia University Press, 1971.
- Weber, M. Economy and Society v.I. Berkeley: University of California Press, 1968.
- Wintersteen, P. B. "The Muromachi Shugo and Hanzei", in Medieval Japan. Ed. John W. Hall and Jeffrey P. Mass. New Haven: Yale University Press, 1974.
- Wintersteen, P. B. "The Early Muromachi Bakufu in Kyoto", in Medieval Japan. Ed. John W. Hall and Jeffrey P. Mass. New Haven: Yale University Press, 1974.
- Yamamura, K. The Cambridge History of Japan, Volume 3: Cambridge: Cambridge University Press, 1990.

| Preceded by Kenmu Restoration | Nanboku-chō period (early part of the Muromachi period); 1336–1392 | Succeeded by Sengoku period |
