= Fujiwara no Mitsuyoshi =

- 藤原光能
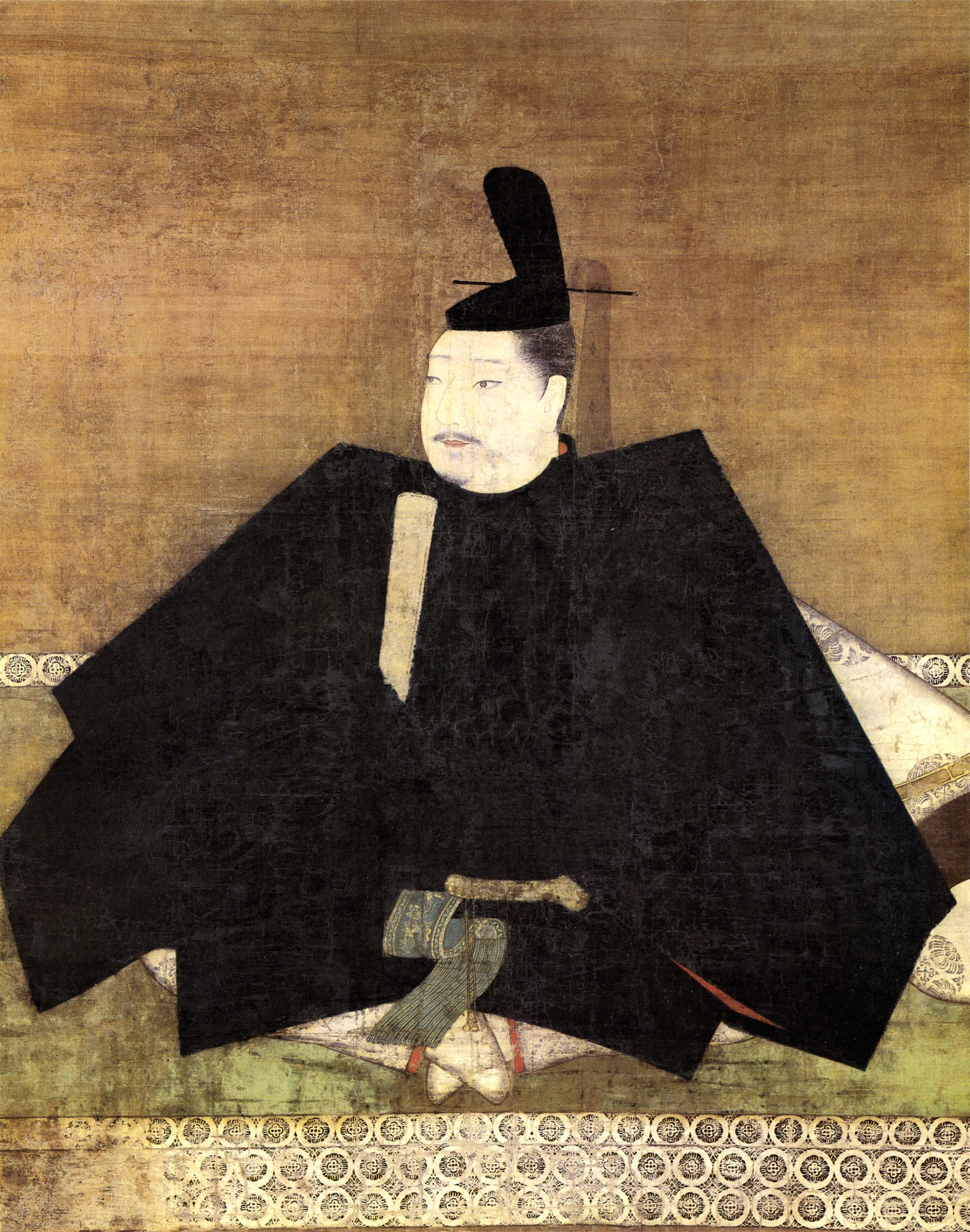
- Portrait of Fujiwara no Mitsuyoshi (stored at Jingo-ji)

Associate Counselor
- In office 1179–1179
- Monarch: Takakura

Commander of Middle Palace Guards
- In office 1182–1183
- Monarch: Antoku

Personal details
- Born: 1132
- Died: March 23, 1183 (aged 52)
- Parent: Fujiwara no Tadanari (father)
- Occupation: court noble

Fujiwara no Mitsuyoshi (藤原 光能, 1132 – March 23, 1183) was a Japanese court noble of the late Heian period. He was a personal attendant of Emperor Go-Shirakawa. He served as Associate Counselor, Commander of the Middle Palace Guards, Head Chamberlain, Governor of Shimotsuke Province, Lieutenant General of the Imperial Guard Division, and held the court rank of Senior Third Rank.

== Life ==
Mitsuyoshi was born in 1132, the son of Junior Assistant Minister of Popular Affairs Fujiwara no Tadanari. His mother was the daughter of Minamoto no Suetada.

In his early career, he served as Lieutenant General of the Imperial Guard Division and Governor of Shimotsuke Province.

In 1176, from his position as a personal attendant of Emperor Go-Shirakawa, he was promoted to Head Chamberlain (kurōdo no tō), surpassing the position of Taira no Kiyomori's favorite son Tomomori.

In 1179, he briefly served as Associate Counselor, but was removed from office following Kiyomori's coup d'état the same year. After the relocation of the capital to Fukuhara and the resumption of the imperial government the next year, Mitsuyoshi regained his position as Associate Counselor in 1181. He was then promoted to Commander of Middle Palace Guards and given the court rank of Senior Third Rank.

In 1183, Mitsuyoshi underwent pabbajjā. He died on March 23, 1183 at the age of 52.

According to The Tale of the Heike, Mitsuyoshi presented the court order for the punitive expedition of the Taira clan and brought it to Minamoto no Yoritomo. According to Gukanshō, however, this story is pointed out to not be factual. Nevertheless, there is no doubt that Mitsuyoshi was a close attendant of Emperor Go-Shirakawa, and a portrait of him and Go-Shirakawa survives at Jingō-ji.

== Family ==
- Father: Fujiwara no Tadanari
- Mother: Minamoto no Suetada's daughter
- Wife: Adachi Tōmoto's daughter
- Wife: Nakahara Hirosue's daughter
  - Son: Nakahara no Chikayoshi (1143-1209)
- Wife: Monk Kyōson's daughter
  - Fujiwara no Tadatsune
- Unknown mother:
  - Son: Ōe no Hiromoto (1148-1225)
  - Son: Fujiwara no Ieyoshi (adopted by Fujiwara no Kanemitsu)
