= Tandai =

The term tandai (Japanese: 探題) is a Kamakura and Muromachi period colloquialism for any very important governmental, judiciary or military post in a determinate area. During the Kamakura shogunate, examples of tandai in the east of the country were the shikken and the rensho, in the west of the country and in Kyūshū the Rokuhara tandai and the Chinzei bugyō, also called Chinzei tandai.

Examples during the Muromachi period were the Chinzei bugyō, also called Kyūshū tandai, Ōshū province's Ōshū tandai and Dewa province's Ushū tandai.

== Known tandai ==
- Imagawa Sadayo (Kyūshū tandai, 1371-1395)
