= Chinzei Bugyō =

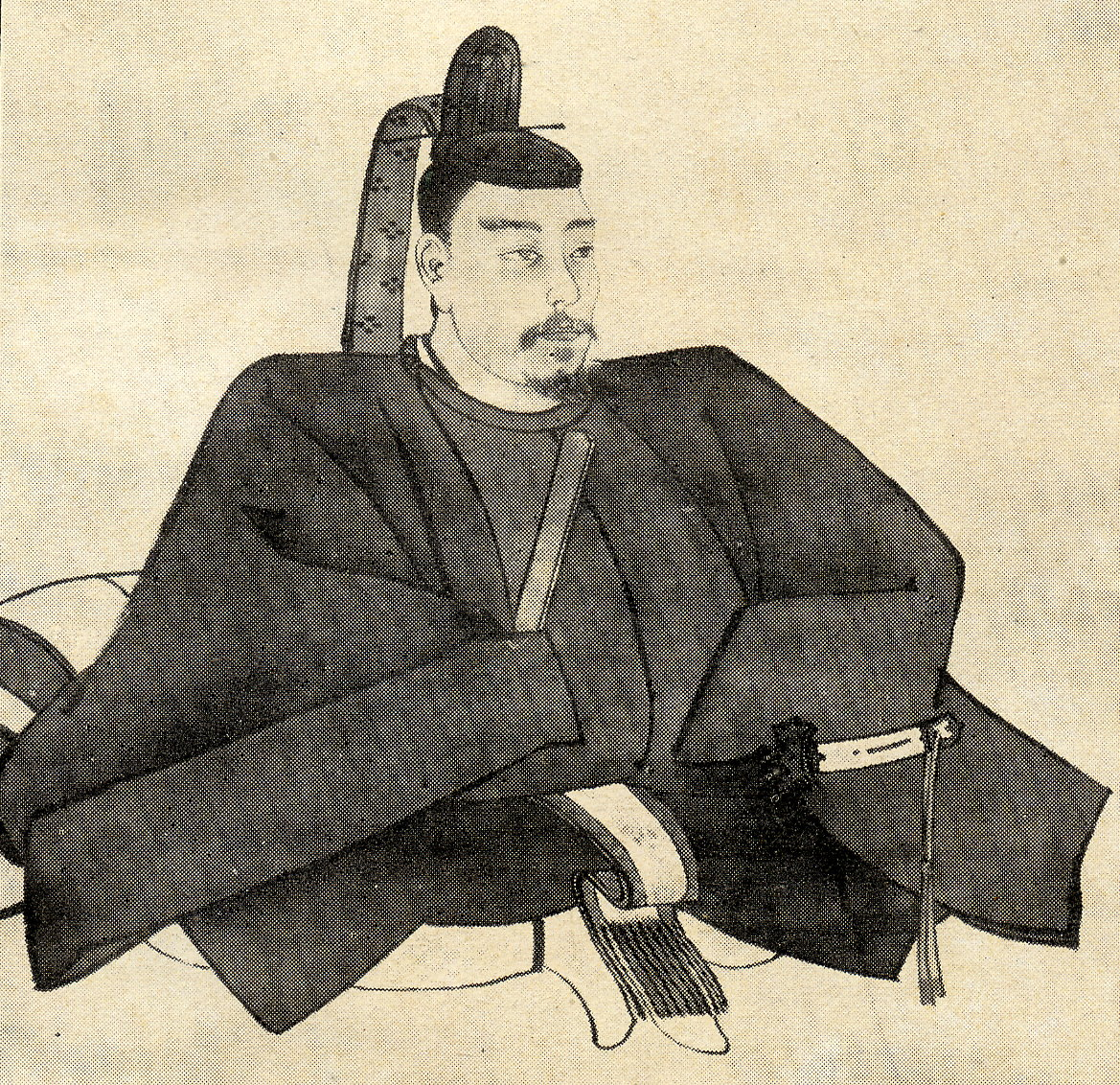
Portrait of Minamoto no Yoritomo from the Taisho Era

Chinzei Bugyō (鎮西奉行), or Defense Commissioner of the West, was the name given to a post created in 1186 to oversee the defense of Kyūshū. At the time, the primary mission of the Bugyō was to seek out and eliminate anyone who had supported Minamoto no Yoshitsune over his brother Yoritomo to become shōgun. However, less than a hundred years later, the Chinzei (Western Defense Headquarters) took on the responsibilities of a true Defense Headquarters, acting as the first line of defense against the Mongols. Over time, the position of Bugyō, the head of the Defense Headquarters, became known as Chinzei Shugo or Chinzei Tandai. This was but one of several similar posts established across the country.

The first Chinzei Bugyō was Amano Tōkage, who was succeeded soon afterwards by Nakawara Nobufusa, who was sent to suppress resistance in Kyūshū. He established the Chinzei at Dazaifu, where he received all the Shogun's orders for Kyūshū; local lords could not be trusted to obey local constables, and so the Kyūshū Tandai (as the Chinzei Bugyō was sometimes known) had to act as intermediary between Kyūshū and the capital at Kamakura.
