= Shōjōkō-ji =

Buddhist temple in Fujisawa, Kanagawa, Japan

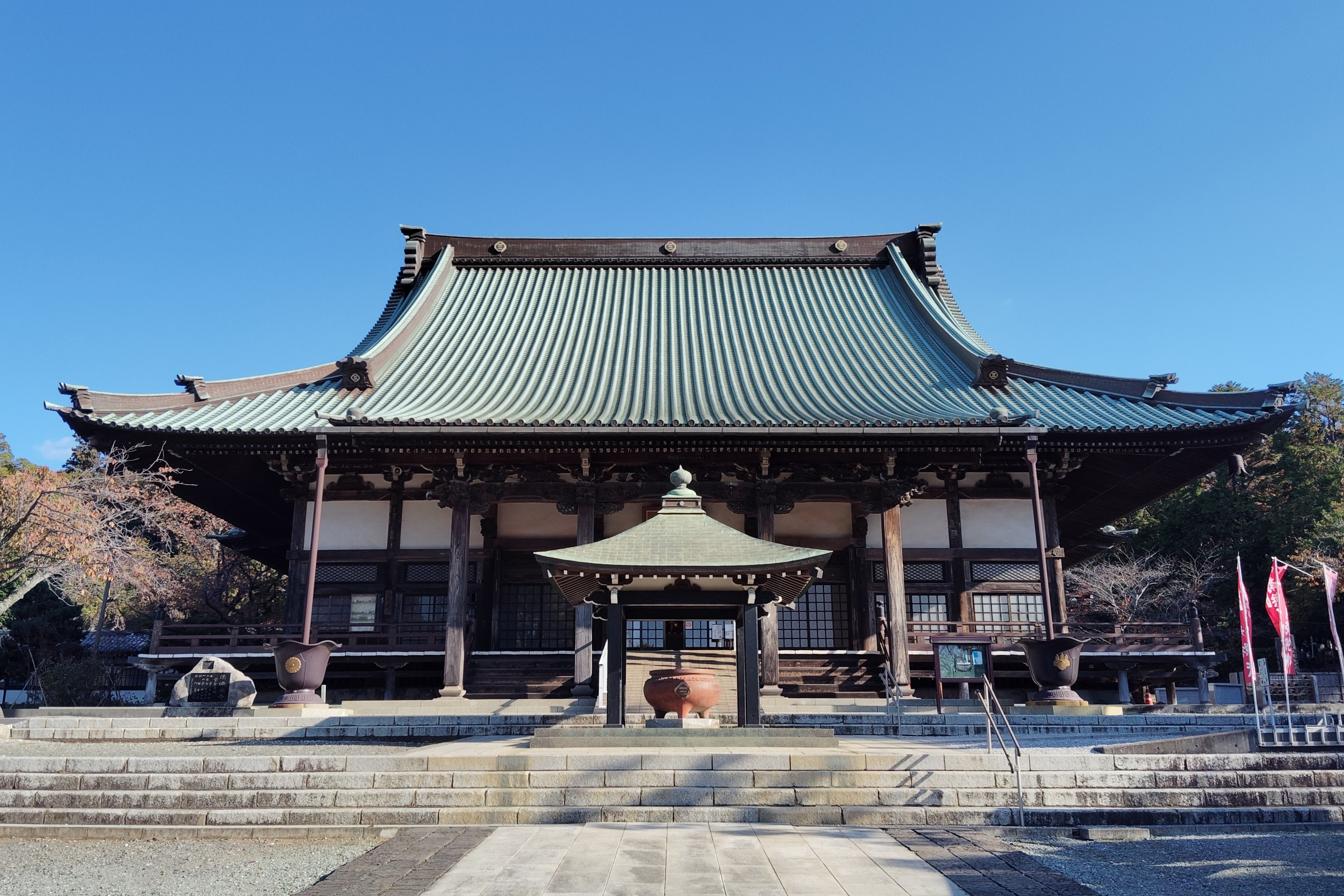
- Shōjōkō-ji Main hall

- Shōjōkō-ji Shōjōkō-ji (Japan)

Religion
- Affiliation: Buddhist
- Deity: Amida Nyorai
- Rite: Ji-shu

Location
- Location: 1-8-1Nishitomi, Fujisawa-shi, Kanagawa-ken
- Country: Japan
- Interactive map of Shōjōkō-ji
- Coordinates: 35°20′54.65″N 139°29′19.12″E

Architecture
- Founder: Matano Gorōkagehira
- Completed: 1325

Website
- Official website
- National Historic Site of Japan

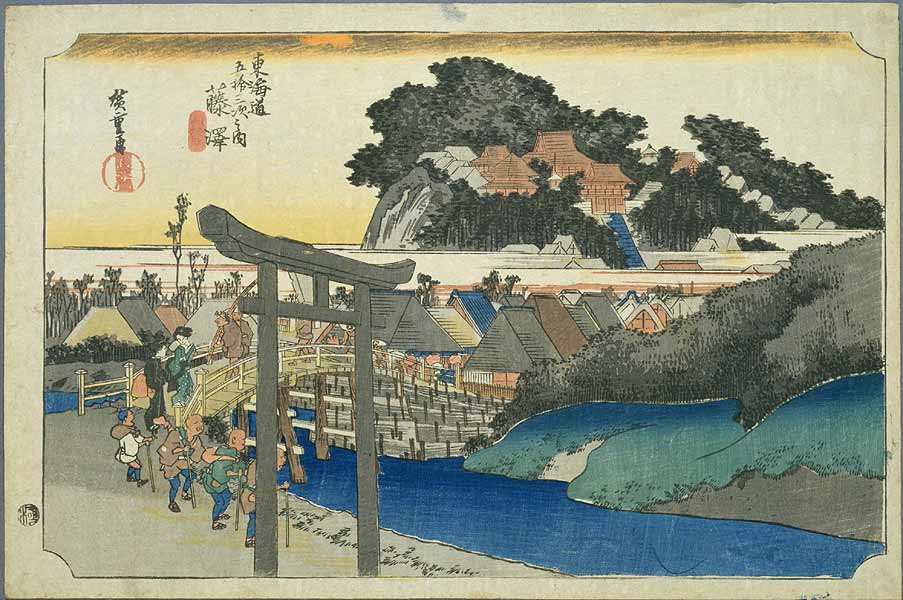
Hiroshige

Shōjōkō-ji (清浄光寺) is a Buddhist temple located in the city of Fujisawa, Kanagawa Prefecture, Japan. It is the headquarters of the Ji-shu branch of Pure Land Buddhism, founded in the Kamakura period by Ippen. The formal name of the temple is Tōtaku-san Muryōkō-in Shōjōkō-ji (藤沢山 無量光院 清浄光寺), and its honzon is a statue of Amida Nyorai. As the head priest of the temple, Tōtaku Shōnin, also bears the inherited title Yugyō Shōnin (遊行上人), the temple has become familiarly known as Yugyō-ji (遊行寺) since the Edo period. The temple is also sometimes referred to as Fujisawa-dōjō.

== History ==
The temple was founded in 1325 by the local Matano clan, whose estates extended from present-day Nishimatano, Fujisawa to Matano-chō and Higashimatano-chō in Totsuka-ku, Yokohama and the 4th head of the sect, Dōnkai. However, it was located on the site of a much older temple called Gokuraku-ji, were Ippen had stayed while preaching in Kamakura and making a pilgrimage to Enoshima. The temple was supported by the kanrei Ashikaga Mochiuji in 1435. The temple was destroyed in 1513 in a battle between Hōjō Soun, Miura Dosun, and Ōta Sukeyasu. Shōjōkō-ji had bad relations especially with the Later Hōjō clan after the castellan of Tamanawa Castle had seized temple properties. In 1591, the 32nd Yugyō Shōnin was invited by Satake Yoshinobu of Hitachi Province to build the Mito Fujisawa Dōjō (later known as Jinnō-ji) in Mito, making it the headquarters of the Ji-shu sect. Shōjōkō-ji was finally rebuilt in 1607, almost after a century.

In 1631, the temple received official recognition from the Tokugawa shogunate as the head temple of the 274 Ji-shu temples in the country. It burned down in 1661, but the new Main Hall was completed in 1664. In 1694, in accordance with Shōgun Tokugawa Tsunayoshi's Edicts on Compassion for Living Things (生類憐みの令, Shōruiawareminorei) Shōjōkō-ji became a sanctuary for goldfish in the city of Edo. On October 15, 1737, the current principal image of the temple, a seated Amida Nyōrai, was moved from Hōjū-in, a sub-temple of Nirin-ji Temple in Asakusa. Following the Meiji restoration, the temple lost the estates that had been granted it by the shogunate for its upkeep, as well as its official red seal which had permitted its priests to travel freely anywhere in the country. However, the temple gained prestige when Emperor Meiji made it his lodging on October 10, 1868 en route to Tokyo. Most of the temple was destroyed by a fire in 1880, leaving only the Chujakumon Gate. Although quickly rebuilt, the temple again burned down on July 6, 1911, which also destroyed its National Treasure "Ippen Shōnin Ekotōba-den" (Illustrated Tales of Yugyō Shōnin) scrolls. The temple suffered further damage in the 1923 Great Kanto earthquake, which collapsed its Main Hall. The current Main Hall was rebuilt in 1937.

In 1977, the Yugyōji Treasure Museum was established, displaying picture scrolls related to Ippen that had previously been scattered throughout the country.

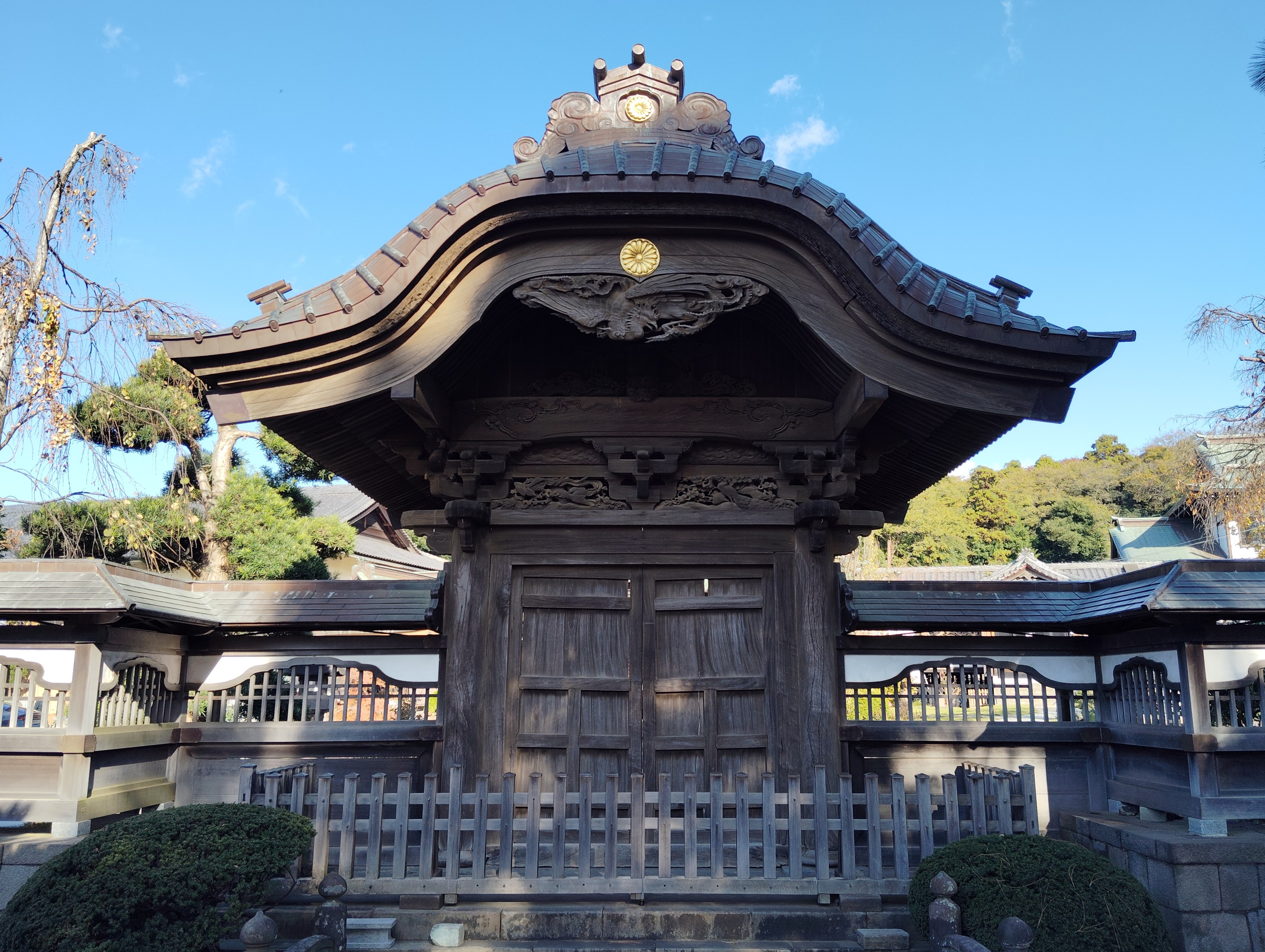
Kujakumon Gate

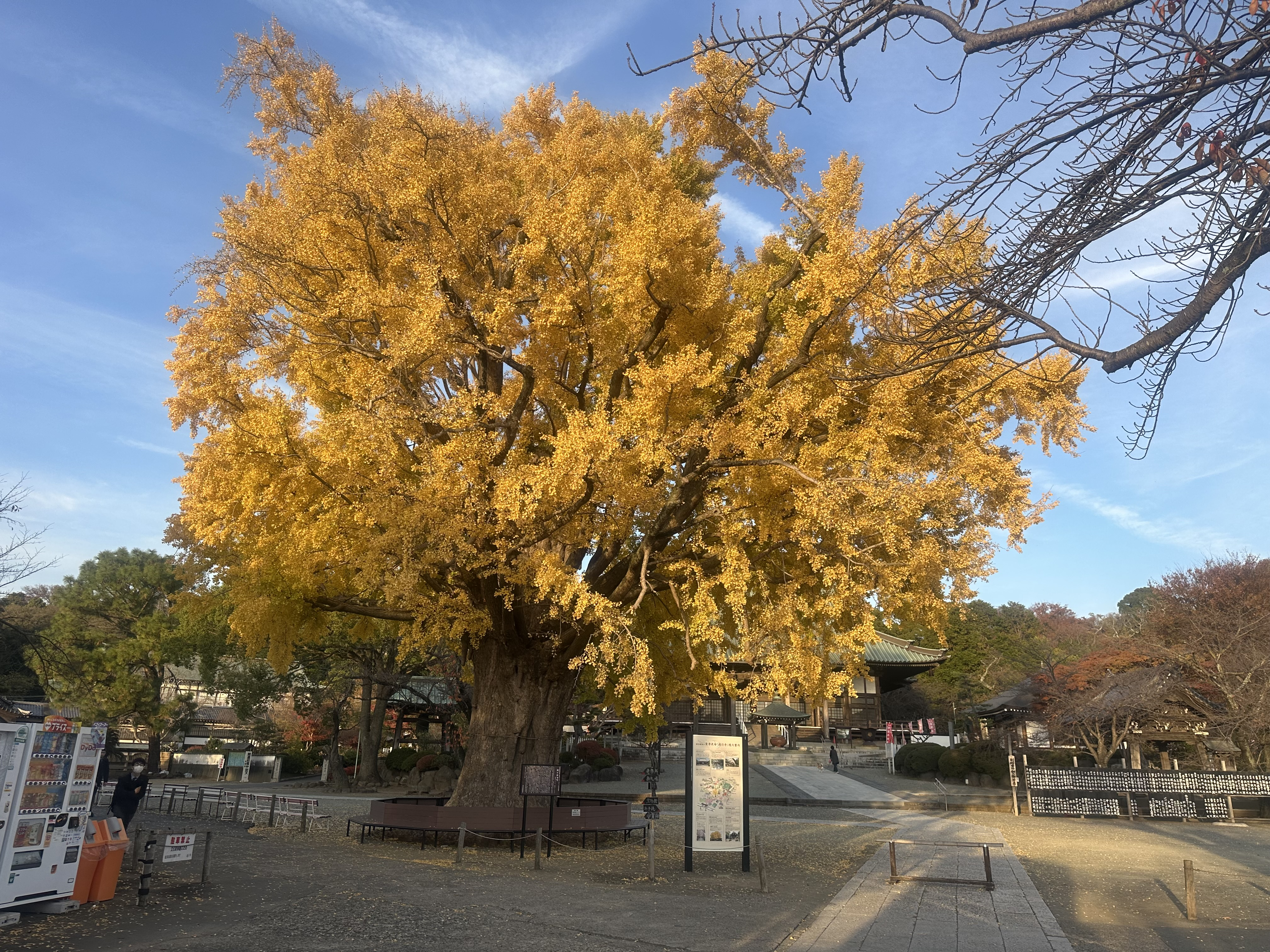
ginkgo biloba

Several views, 2025

== Fujisawa Memorial Tower to Friends and Foe ==
The Fujisawa Memorial Tower to Friends and Foe (藤沢敵御方供養塔, Fujisawa tekimikata kuyōtō) is a kuyōtō, or a form of stupa built for the purpose of memorial service so that the deceased can rest in peace, and is thus slightly different from the more secular cenotaph. It was built by the 14th head of the sect, Taikū, to commemorate the people and animals who died in the Uesugi Zenshu Rebellion of 1416. This was a civil war between the Kantō Kubō Ashikaga Mochiuji and the kanrei Uesugi Zenshū. The disturbance cumulated in the Eikyō Rebellion in 1438. Also called the "Enshin Byōdō Monument" is 130-cm high and 28-cm wide. It was designated a National Historic Site in 1926.
