= Kōmyō-ji (Hiratsuka) =

Buddhist temple in Hiratsuka, Japan

- 光明寺
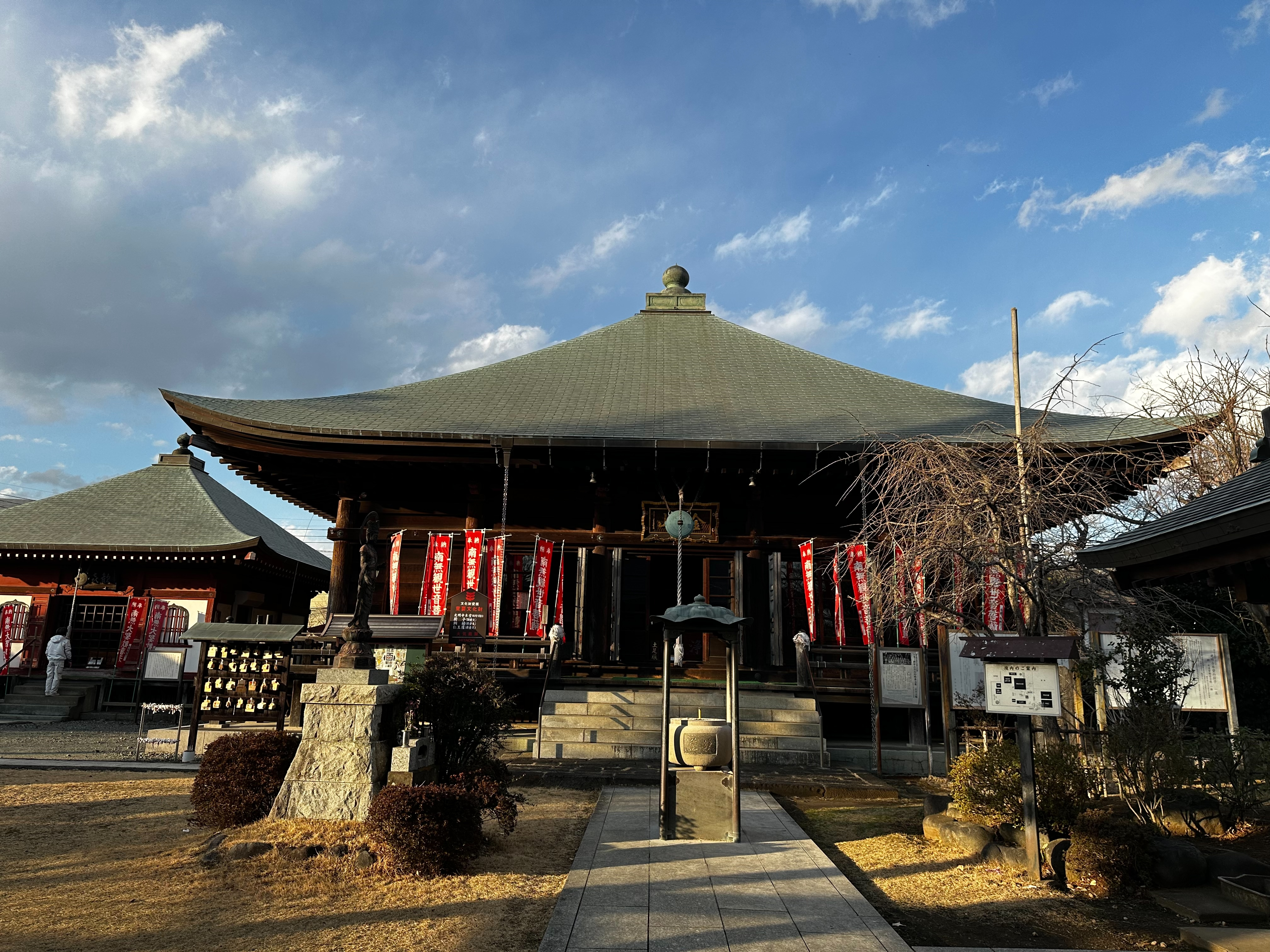
- Kōmyō-ji Kannon-dō

- Location within Kanagawa Prefecture Location within Japan

Religion
- Affiliation: Buddhist
- Deity: Shō-Kannon Bosatsu
- Rite: Tendai
- Status: functional

Location
- Location: 896 Minamikanme, Hiratsuka-shi, Kanagawa-ken
- Country: Japan
- Coordinates: 35°21′31.5″N 139°17′19.6″E

Architecture
- Founder: unknown
- Completed: unknown
- National Important Cultural Property }

Kōmyō-ji (光明寺) is a Buddhist temple located in the Minamikaname neighborhood of the city of Hiratsuka, Kanagawa Prefecture, Japan. It belongs to the Tendai sect and its honzon is a statue of Shō-Kannon Bosatsu. The temple's full name is Kaname-san Kōmyō-ji (金目山 光明寺).The temple is the 7th stop on the Bandō Sanjūsankasho pilgrimage route. It is also called the "Kanahi Kannon".

== History ==
Details surrounding the founding of this temple are uncertain. According to the temple's legend, in 702 an ama diving woman found a statue of Kannon Bosatsu in the sea. Later, during the Tempyō era (729–749), priest Gyōki made a statue of Kannon Bosatsu, inside of which he enclosed the one found.

Minamoto no Yoritomo, Ashikaga Takauji and others were devotees of this temple and donated estates for its upkeep. However, it was devastated by the wars of the Eikyō period (1429-1441) between the Ashikaga shogunate and Ashikaga Mochiuji.

It was restored under Ōta Dōkan in the Meiō era (1492–1501), and was rebuilt again in 1697.

It temporarily declined in the early Meiji period, but has been revived in recent years.

== Bandō Sanjūsankasho (Bandō 33 temple pilgrimage) ==
The temple is the 7th temple on the 33 temple Bandō Sanjūsankasho pilgrimage route.

== Access ==
The temple is located approximately 7.4-kilometers northwest or 18-minutes by car from Hiratsuka Station on the Tokaido Main Line.

== Cultural Properties ==
=== National Important Cultural Properties ===
- Altar in Main Hall with wooden standing Kannon Bosatsu (本堂内厨子 附 木造聖観音立像); The temple's honzon is housed in a Zen-style cabinet. The honzon itself is a hibutsu hidden image and is not covered by the National ICP designation, which refers to the maedachi Kannon statue standing in front of the altar. The assembly dates from the reconstruction of the temple in 1498.

=== Kanagawa Prefectural Important Tangible Cultural Properties ===
- Kannon-dō (光明寺観音堂); The current main hall is thought to have been built during reconstruction of the temple in 1498. Afterwards, major repairs were carried out from 1696-1697 and 1983-1986.
- Wooden Kongō Rikishi statues (木造金剛力士立像); Housed on either side of the Niōmon gate, the Kongo Rikishi statues are 282.0 and 292.0-cm tall. There are inscriptions written in ink inside of the statue, which indicates they were carved in 1493 and repair in 1517.
- Bronze Bell (銅鐘); The temple's bonshō has an inscription with the date of 1352.

=== Hiratsuka City Important Tangible Cultural Properties ===
- Wooden standing Kannon Bosatsu (木造聖観音立像); This 167.7-cm image is the honzon of the temple and is enshrined in the Zushi as a hibutsu hidden image. It is difficult to determine when this statue was carved, and there are various theories ranging from the Heian period to the Kamakura period. Because there are differences in the parts and style of the head and body, there is also the idea that the body was a later replacement. The pedestal was rebuilt in 1493, and there are inscriptions with the names of over 100 people. Among them, the name Ota Dokan is prominent, but there are also names of monks as well as farmers, and many names that seem to be female, and both monks and laypeople. It is clear that people from a wide range of classes supported the temple reconstruction project during the Meiō era.
- Wooden standing statues of the 33 avatars of Kannon (木造観音三十三応現身立像); These statues range from 53.5 to 60.8-cm tall, and are enshrined on a side platform inside the Main Hall. According to the Kannon Sutra, Kannon Bosatsu transforms into 33 different forms depending on the person and place to be saved. The statues in a simple style, and the carvings on their clothes and armor are shallow. Many of the statues are missing hands and accessories, so it is currently difficult to clarify the names of all of them. It is estimated that they were carved in the early Muromachi period. There is a colored inscription dated 1498 at the bottom of some statues, but it is thought to be an inscription at the time of repair, not at the time of carving.
- Niō-mon (仁王門); When the gate was dismantled and repaired in 1987, many inscriptions in ink were discovered, indicating that it had been dismantled and repaired following the main hall in 1698. Among the dismantled parts, some of the components were found to be older than the Genroku period, and their shape suggests that they date from the late Muromachi period (mid-16th century).
- Kōmyō documents (光明寺古文書); The temple also has two scrolls containing ten ancient documents, including writings by Minamoto no Yoritomo, Ashikaga Takauji, Ashikaga Mitsukane and others.
- Kōmyō Engi-sho (光明寺縁起書); This document dated 1710 was written by Tazoe Hidenori (田副秀則), a retainer of Honjō Munetoshi (本庄宗俊), daimyō of Hamamatsu Domain, describing the legend of the temple's founding.
