= Kamakura-fu =

Historical regional government in Japan

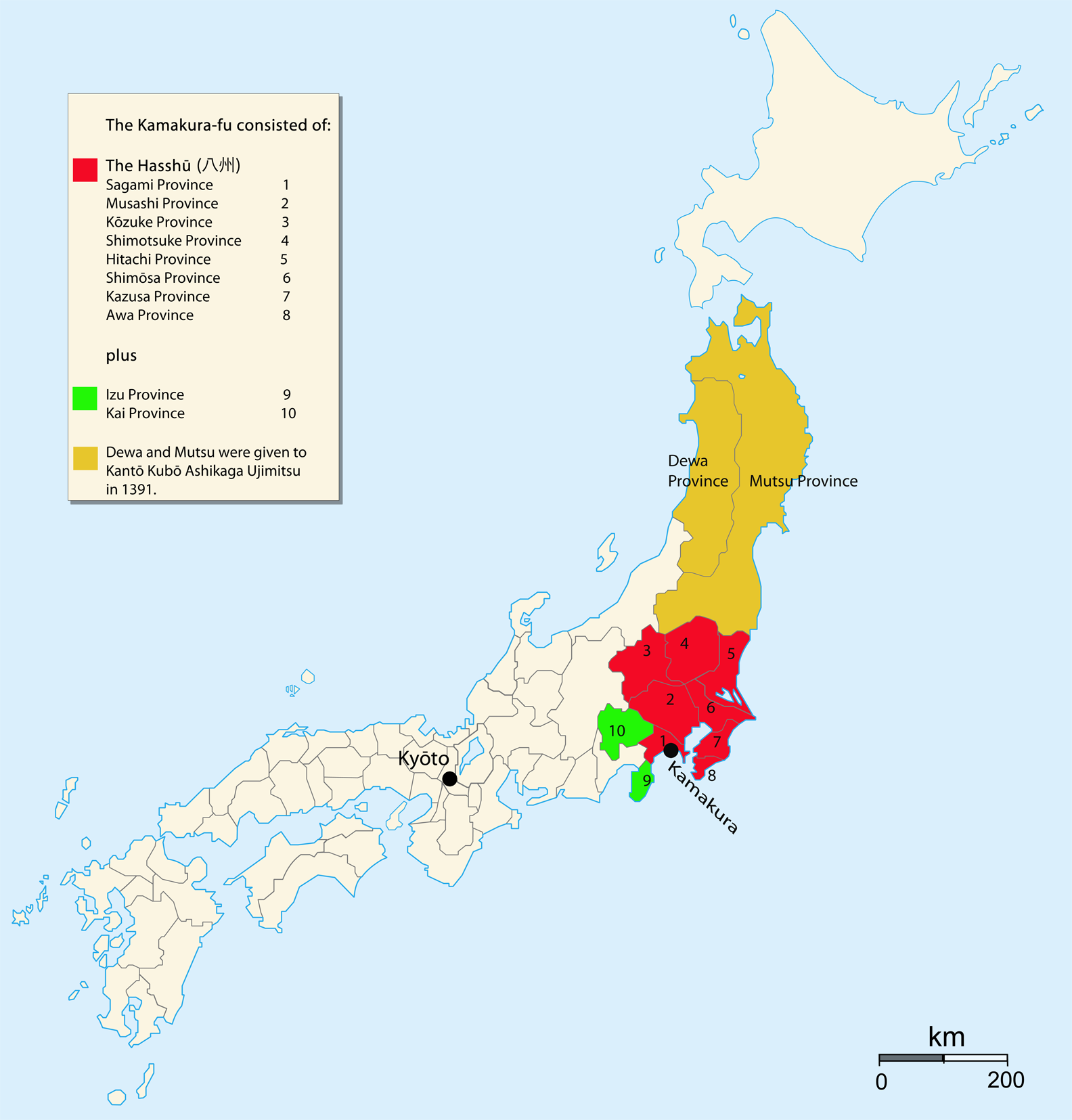
The Kamakura-fu at the time of its maximum expansion

The Kamakura-fu (鎌倉府, Kamakura government) or Kantō-fu (関東府, Kantō government) was a regional government installed in Kamakura, in today's Kanagawa Prefecture, by the Ashikaga shogunate which lasted from 1349 to 1455. It was headed by a dynasty of Ashikaga rulers called Kamakura Kubō (or Kantō Kubō). They were assisted by deputies called Kantō Kanrei traditionally chosen among the members of the Uesugi clan.

Structurally, the Kamakura-fu was a small-scale duplicate of Kyoto's government, had full judiciary and executive powers within its territories and was responsible for its military. At first its territory included just the eight Kantō provinces (the Hasshū (八州)), plus Kai and Izu. Later, Kantō Kubō Ashikaga Ujimitsu was given by the shogunate as a reward for his military support the two huge provinces of Mutsu and Dewa.

== History of the Kamakura-fu ==
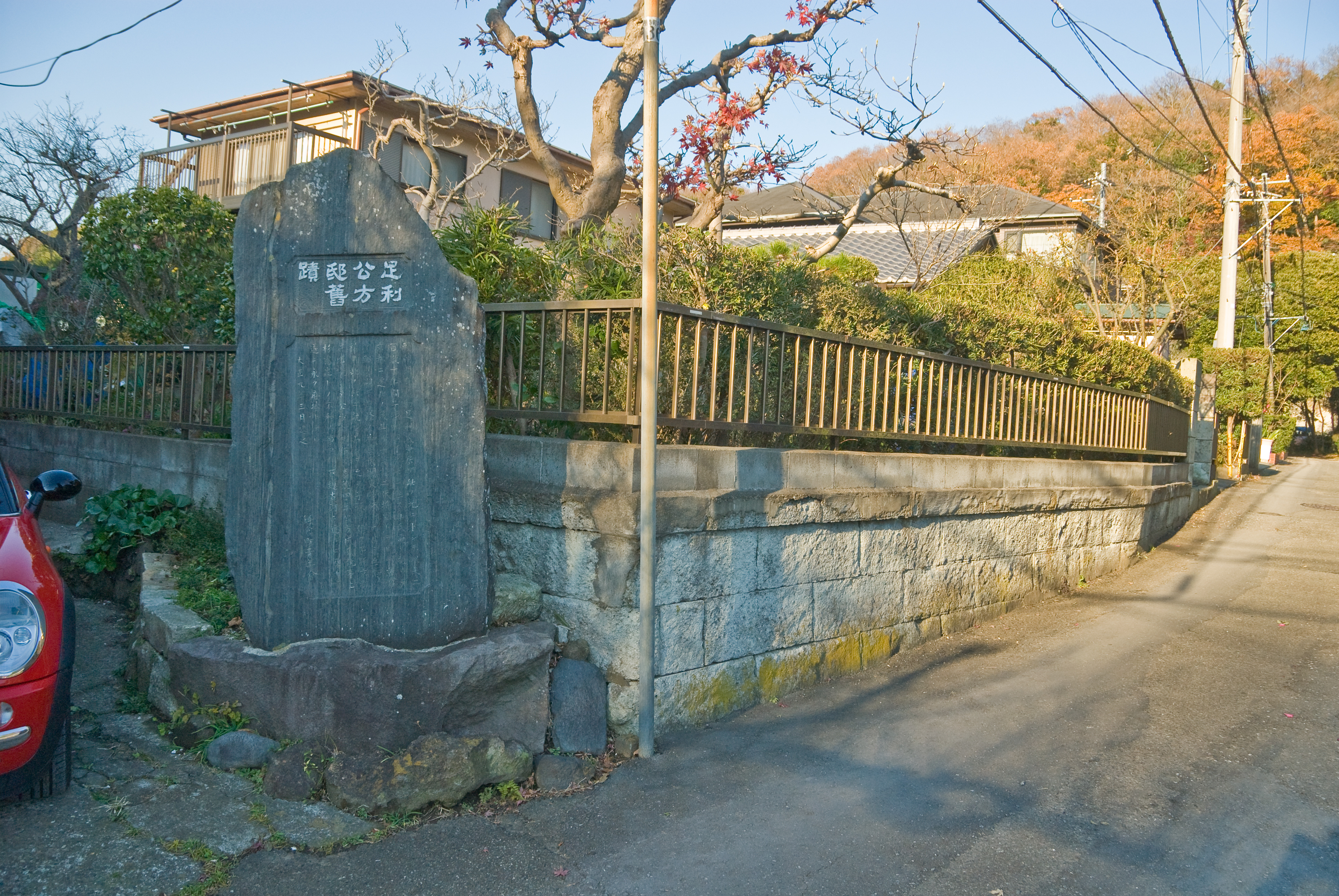
The stele that marks the spot in Kamakura where the kubō's mansion, seat of the government, used to stand

In 1333, immediately after the Kamakura Shogunate's fall, Emperor Go-Daigo wanted to re-establish his rule in Kamakura and the east of the country without sending there a shōgun, as this was seen, just a year from Kamakura's fall, as still too dangerous. As a compromise, he sent his six-year-old son Prince Norinaga to Mutsu Province (in today's Aomori region) and nominated him Governor-General of the Mutsu and Dewa Provinces. In an obvious reply to this move, Ashikaga Tadayoshi, without an order from the Emperor escorted another of his sons, eleven-year-old Prince Nariyoshi (a.k.a. Narinaga) to Kamakura, where he installed him as Governor of the Kōzuke Province with himself as a Deputy and de facto ruler. Since he ruled without interference from Kyoto and the area in itself was in effect a miniature shogunate, this event can be considered the first embryo of what was going soon to be the Ashikaga shogunate.

Ashikaga Takauji, founder of the Ashikaga shogunate which, at least nominally, ruled Japan during the 14th, 15th and 16th centuries, at first established his residence deliberately at the same site in Kamakura where Yoritomo's Ōkura Bakufu had been, but in 1336 he left Kamakura in charge of his son Yoshiakira and went west in pursuit of Nitta Yoshisada. Persistent problems with Emperor Go-Daigo then convinced Takauji of the necessity to stay in the East. The Ashikaga ended up residing permanently in Kyoto, making Kamakura instead the capital of the Kamakura-fu (鎌倉府), a region including the provinces of Sagami, Musashi, Awa, Kazusa, Shimōsa, Hitachi, Kōzuke, Shimotsuke (the so-called Hasshū), plus Kai and Izu. The Kamakura-fu was therefore the equivalent of today's Kantō, plus the Shizuoka and Yamanashi Prefectures. In 1391 Kubō Ashikaga Ujimitsu was rewarded by shōgun Ashikaga Yoshimitsu for his help against the Yamana clan with the two huge provinces of Dewa and Mutsu, bringing the total to twelve provinces.

The de facto beginning of the Kamakura-fu can be considered the arrival in Kamakura Ashikaga Takauji's son Yoshiakira. As already mentioned, Yoshiakira had been sent by his father to the Kantō in 1336 as his representative. The first official Kamakura-fu however was born in 1349 when Ashikaga Motouji was sent to Kamakura by his father to replace Yoshiakira, who was wanted in Kyoto. Motouji was followed in order by Ashikaga Ujimitsu, Mitsukane, Mochiuji, and Shigeuji, all of his bloodline.

Motouji had been sent by his father, shōgun Ashikaga Takauji, precisely because the latter understood the importance of controlling the Kantō region and wanted to have an Ashikaga ruler there, but the administration in Kamakura was from the beginning characterized by its rebelliousness, so the shōgun's idea never really worked and actually backfired. The problems that had characterized the institution from its beginning culminated in 1439, when Mochiuji was deposed and the Kamakura-fu retaken by force. After a lapse of ten years, an effort was made to revive the institution and Ashikaga Shigeuji was sent to take his father Mochiuji's place. Tensions between the Kubō, on one side, and the shogunate and the Uesugi Kanrei on the other immediately resurfaced and in 1455 Shigeuji was forced to flee Kamakura to the friendly city of Koga in today's Ibaraki Prefecture, never to return.

The Kamakura-fu's organization thereafter changed greatly, as it was left in the hands of the Uesugi clan, until then at the orders of the Kubō. The Uesugi slowly started to exercise their power to their advantage, and not to Kyoto's, and the Kamakura-fu for all practical purposes ceased to exist. However, according to the Shinpen Kamakurashi, a guide book published in 1685, more than two centuries later the spot where the kubō's mansion had been was still left empty by local peasants in the hope he may one day return.

== See also ==
- Kanrei
- Kantō kubō
- Uesugi clan
- Yūki War
