= Ashikaga Shigeuji =

Samurai and 1st Koga Kubō of the Ashikaga shogunate

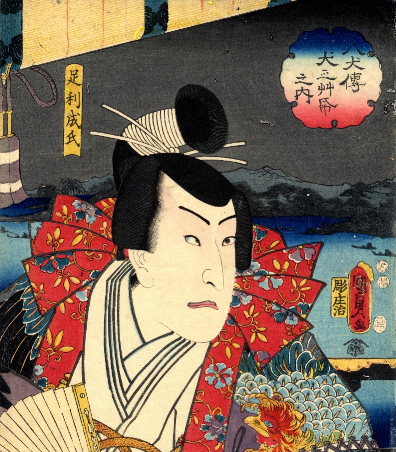
An 1852 portrait of Ashikaga Shigeuji

Ashikaga Shigeuji (足利成氏) (c. 1438 – 1497) was a Muromachi period Japanese samurai warrior and the Kamakura-fu's fifth and last Kantō kubō (Shōgun Deputy). (Note: The post survived, but without real power.) Fourth son of fourth Kubō Ashikaga Mochiuji, he succeeded his father only in 1449, a full decade after his death by seppuku. His childhood name was Eijuō-maru (永寿王丸). (Note: At the time in Japan a child received a temporary name (osanana, yōmei or yōmyō (幼名)), which would be later replaced by a definitive one.) His rule was from its onset troubled by hostilities with the central government: he was finally deposed in 1455 by shōgun Ashikaga Yoshimasa, after which he escaped to Koga in Shimōsa Province, where he became known as Koga kubō. There, he ruled until his death in 1497.

== Biography ==
When in 1439 shōgun Ashikaga Yoshinori attacked and invaded Kamakura, its ruler Mochiuji committed seppuku near today's Zuisen-ji to escape capture. His eldest son Yoshihisa, 14 years old at the time, was also forced to kill himself at nearby Hōkoku-ji. His three younger sons however escaped to Nikkō and in 1440 were led by Yūki Ujitomo, head of the Yūki clan, to his castle in Koga, Shimōsa Province, and survived. When later Ujitomo's castle was attacked by the shogunate, they escaped. Two, Haruō-maru and Yasuō-maru, however were caught and executed, while Eijuō-maru survived. Kamakura and the Kantō would then be ruled for the shogunate by the Uesugi clan until 1449. In that year, Eijuō-maru's uncle Ōi Mochimitsu managed to have him appointed to the post of Kantō kubō (shōgun's deputy in the Kantō region), the first Ashikaga to hold the post since his father's death ten years earlier. On the occasion, the 11-year-old boy reached manhood and received the character Shige (成) for the adult name he was about to assume from shōgun Yoshimasa himself (who took it from his former name, Yoshinari (義成)) and became Shigeuji. Shōgun Yoshimasa, not trusting Shigeuji, nominated his ally Uesugi Noritada kanrei with the task of keeping him informed of what happened in Kamakura. The relationship between the two men, already difficult because of the role the Uesugi had had in Mochiuji's death, was therefore strained from the beginning. Tension culminated with Shigeuji's 1454 killing of Noritada, who was invited at Shigeuji's mansion and there murdered. The killing made the Kantō province fall into chaos because all Uesugi vassals rose against Shigeuji. Imagawa Noritada defeated Shigeuji and Kamakura, and in 1455 Shigeuji had to flee to the friendly city of Koga, where in time he became known as the Koga kubō. The Uesugi asked Yoshimasa to send someone to replace Shigeuji, so he sent his younger brother Masatomo with an army to pacify Kantō, but many vassals had remained faithful to Shigeuji, so Masatomo was unable to even enter Kamakura. He had to stop in Horigoe in Izu Province, and was thereafter known as Horigoe Gosho. The Kantō therefore found itself with two rulers, one in Koga and one in Horigoe, neither of whom was able to rule. The Kantō was, for all practical purposes, once again in the hands of the Uesugi.

This was the beginning of an era in which the Kantō and Kamakura were devastated by a time of civil wars called the Sengoku period. War continued with on one side Masatomo and the Uesugi, on the other Shigeuji and the Chiba, the Utsunomiya, the Oyama and other clans. In 1471 Uesugi forces arrived in Koga, so Shigeuji had to escape to Chiba. Hostilities ceased only in 1482. Shigeuji was able to return to Koga, where he founded a dynasty and ruled until his death in 1497.

== See also ==
- Kyōtoku incident
- Kamakura – The Muromachi and Edo periods
- Yūki War

Preceded by Ashikaga Mochiuji	The five Kantō Kubō; Ashikaga Shigeuji; 1449–1455	Succeeded by —
