= Yūki War =

Armed conflict on Honshu, Japan (1440–1441)

- Part of the Muromachi period
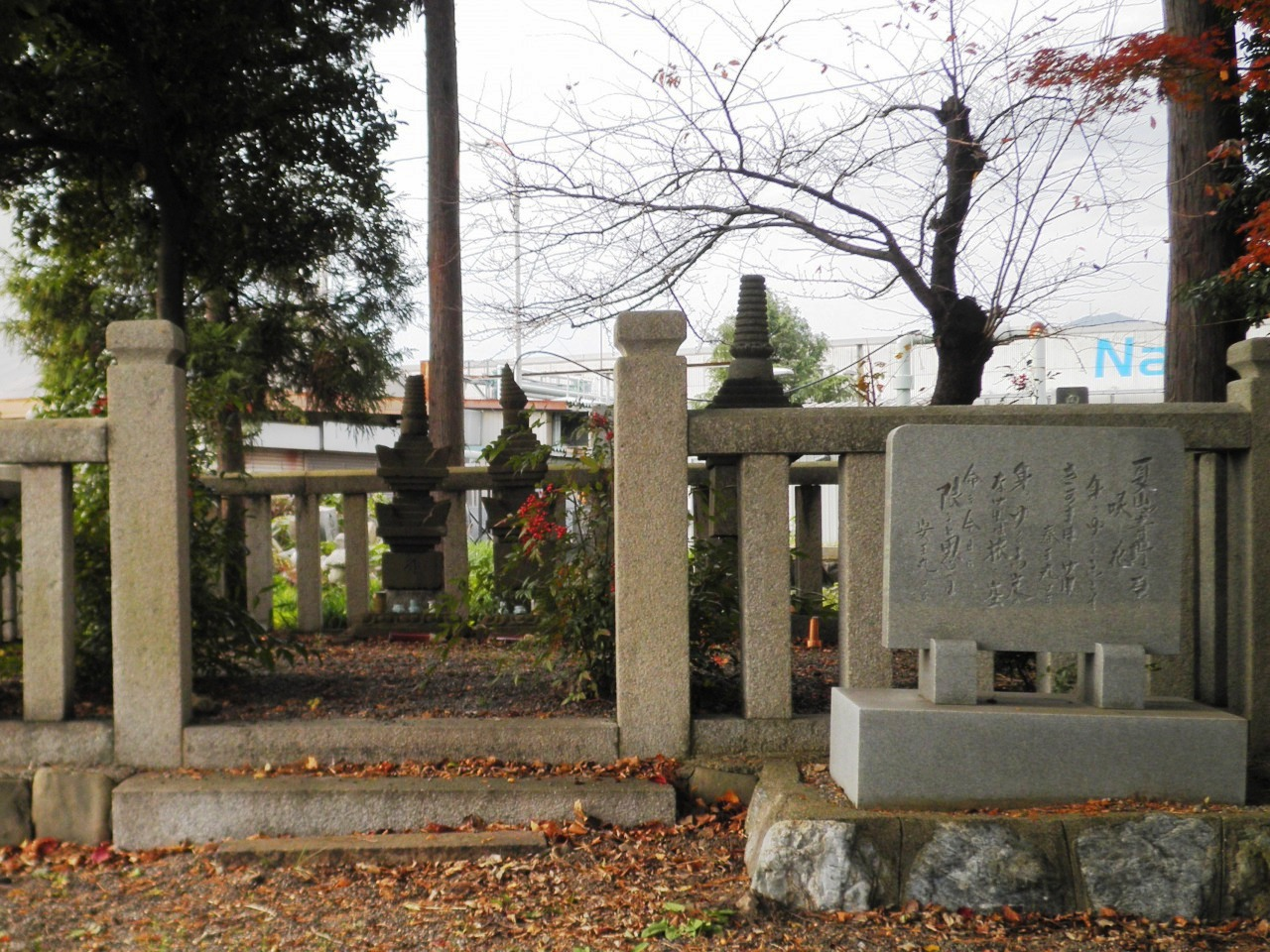
- The graves of Ashikaga Haruō-maru and Yasuō-maru
Date	April 14, 1440 – May 15, 1441
Location	Kantō region
Result	Rebellion suppressed

Belligerents
Ashikaga Shogunate/Uesugi clan	Kantō kokujin

Commanders and leaders
Uesugi Kiyomasa; Uesugi Mochitomo; Ogasawara Masayasu; Utsunomiya Hitotsuna	Yūki Ujitomo †; Yūki Mochitomo †; Ashikaga Haruō-maru; Ashikaga Yasuō-maru

Strength
100,000	20,000

Casualties and losses
Unknown	Unknown

The Yūki War (結城合戦, Yūki Kassen) was a 1440–1441 armed conflict in the Kantō region between the Uesugi clan (and by extension, the Ashikaga Shogunate) and powerful local families who had supported former Kamakura Kubō Ashikaga Mochiuji, most prominently the Yūki clan. It can be considered a continuation of the Eikyō Rebellion that had concluded a year earlier.

== Background ==
Following years of discord between Kamakura Kubō Ashikaga Mochiuji and his deputy Kantō Kanrei Uesugi Norizane, Mochiuji attacked Norizane in 1438 in what came to be known as the Eikyō Rebellion. Mochiuji was ultimately defeated the following year and was forced to commit suicide at the order of Shogun Ashikaga Yoshinori. With Mochiuji's death, the Kamakura-fu was destroyed and the Uesugi clan became an unrivaled power in the Kantō region.

While Mochiuji's eldest son Yoshihisa committed suicide during the conflict, his three youngest sons managed to escape. Haruō-maru, Yasuō-maru, and some of Mochiuji's former retainers were able to flee to Nikkō, while Eijuō-maru, his youngest son (and the future Ashikaga Shigeuji), was taken in by Ōi Mochimitsu of Shinano. Norizane had wanted Mochiuji's life spared and retired to a monastery following his death, passing his position to his brother Kiyomasa.

== Summary ==
On April 14, 1440, backed by Mochiuji's former supporters, Haruō-maru and Yasuō-maru raised a force against the Uesugi clan in Hitachi. They petitioned Yūki Ujitomo, head of the Yūki clan, to allow them to use his stronghold of Yūki Castle in neighboring Shimōsa as their headquarters, and Ujitomo granted this on May 1. Forces opposed to the Uesugi clan and the shogunate soon began assembling at the castle, including Ōi Mochimitsu and Eijuō-maru. The success of the Yūki call for troops reflected Mochiuji's success in building ties with local clans as well as these clan's discontent with the ascendance of the Uesugi in the wake of his death. Support for the rebellion was also sometimes the result of internal divisions within clans; that is, some threw their support behind the Yūki after their rivals moved to back the Uesugi.

During the initial phase of the conflict, the Yūki forces were active in northern Musashi and southern Shimotsuke. They launched notable attacks on Gion Castle (stronghold of the Oyama clan) on May 27 and Naganuma Castle (stronghold of the Naganuma clan) during this period, but failed to capture either. Once significant number of Uesugi troops began approaching, however, the Yūki forces ceased these activities and withdrew to Yūki Castle.

The first Uesugi troops left Kamakura on April 25 under the command of Uesugi Norinobu and Nagao Kagenaka. Kantō Kanrei Uesugi Kiyomasa departed from Kamakura with his main body of troops on May 29 to put down the rebellion, laying siege to it on August 15. The shogunate also ordered Ogasawara Masayasu, the shugo of Shinano, to join this force. Other shogunate forces were called from as far away as Kyushu, but the bulk of the forces were provided by the Uesugi clan, its vassals, and the kokujin of Kōzuke.

There was a failed attempt to break the siege on September 4. Despite its numbers, the Uesugi siege of the castle was incomplete, and the castle's defenders were able to bring some supplies in at night, causing the siege to drag on for nearly nine months. Once the defenders' supplies were finally exhausted, an all-out attack on the castle was carried out on May 15, 1441, and Ujitomo and his son Mochitomo committed suicide. All the castle's defenders were killed by the Uesugi forces. Haruō-maru and Yasuō-maru attempted to escape the castle wearing women's clothing but were captured. They were executed in Mino on orders of the shogun while being transported back to Kyoto.

== Aftermath ==
The Yūki clan was destroyed, although Ujitomo's youngest son Shigetomo would later be allowed to reestablish it. Two months after the end of the war, Shogun Ashikaga Yoshinori would be assassinated by Akamatsu Mitsusuke after being invited to a banquet nominally being held to celebrate the shogunate's victory in the war, sparking the Kakitsu War. Despite the defeat of the Yūki, small-scale attacks by their former supporters would continue to threaten Uesugi control of Kantō in the years following.

While Haruō-maru and Yasuō-maru had been executed, Ashikaga Mochiuji's final son Eijuō-maru survived, finding shelter with Toki Mochimasu, the shugo of Mino. He would ultimately be allowed to re-establish the position of Kamakura Kubō in 1448. Shigeuji would also ultimately come into conflict with the Uesugi clan, however, leading to the Kyōtoku War in 1454.

== See also ==
- Yūki Kassen Ekotoba
