= Zuisen-ji =

Buddhist temple in Nikaidō, Kamakura, Japan

Coordinates: 35°19′37.19″N 139°34′30.92″E

Kinbyōzan Zuisen-ji
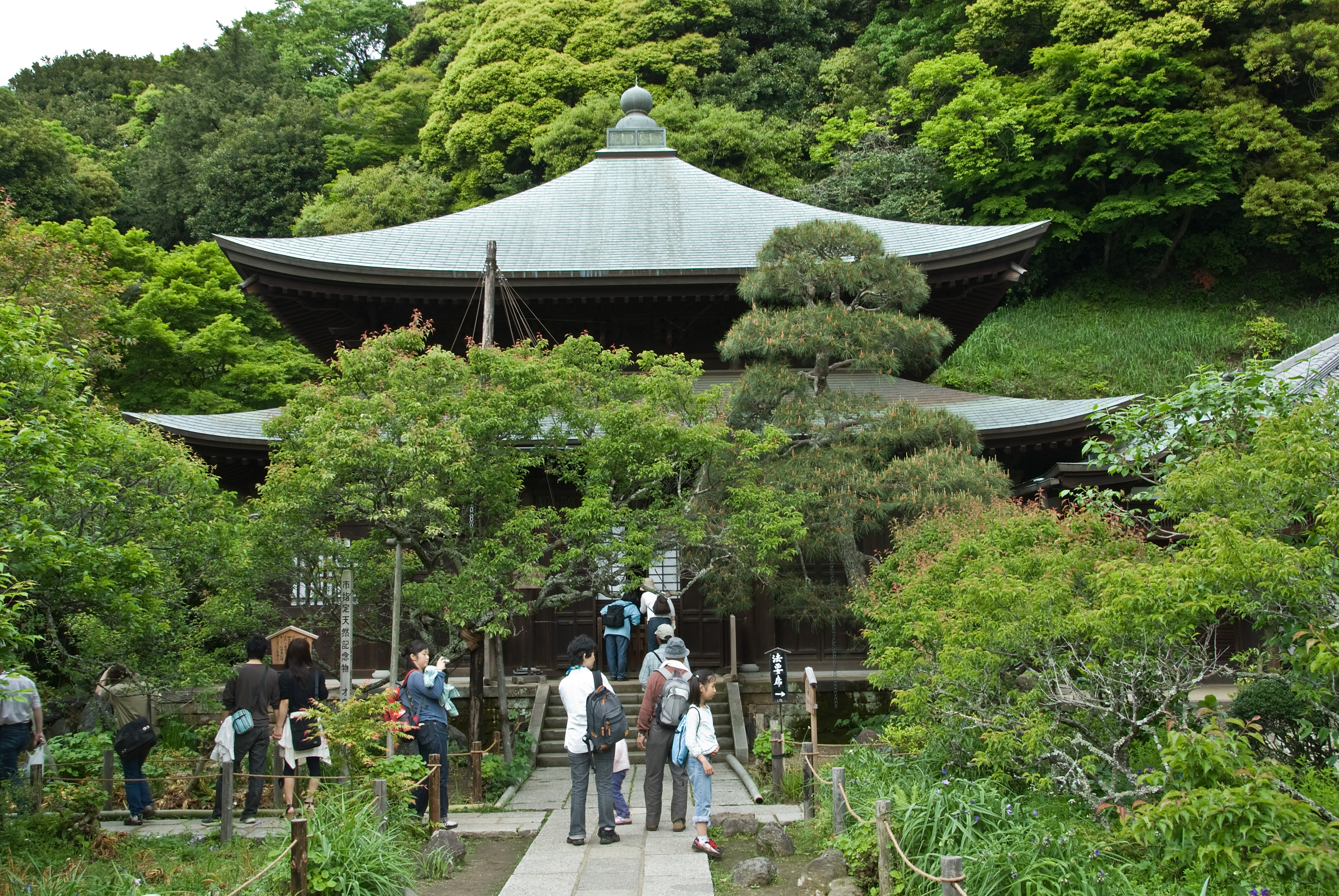
- The Main Hall (Butsuden)

Religion
- Affiliation: Rinzai, Engaku-ji school

Location
- Location: 710 Nikaidō, Kamakura, Kanagawa 248-0002
- Country: Japan
- Interactive map of Kinbyōzan Zuisen-ji

Architecture
- Founder: Nikaidō Dōun and Musō Soseki (founding priest)
- Completed: 1327

Website
- None

Kinbyōzan Zuisen-ji (錦屏山瑞泉寺) is a Buddhist temple of the Rinzai sect in Nikaidō's Momijigayatsu Valley (紅葉ヶ谷, Valley of the Autumn Leaves) in Kamakura, Japan. During the Muromachi period it was the family temple of the Ashikaga rulers of Kamakura (the Kantō kubō): four of the five kubō are buried there in a private cemetery closed to the public and first kubō Ashikaga Motouji's is also known by the name Zuisen-ji-den (瑞泉寺殿). Designed by prominent Zen religious figure, poet and Zen garden designer Musō Soseki (also known as Musō Kokushi), the temple lies on top of an isolated hill and is famous for both its garden and its Zen rock garden. The beauty and the quantity of its plants have gained it since antiquity the nickname "Temple of Flowers" (花の寺). The main object of worship is Jizō Bosatsu. Zuisen-ji is an Historic Site and contains numerous objects classified as Important Cultural Properties and Places of Scenic Beauty.

== History ==
Musō Soseki was not only the temple's founding priest, but also its main designer. His sponsor, Nikaidō Dōun, was the lord of Kai in today's Yamanashi prefecture, where Musō had spent his youth. The name of Dōun's family's had originally been Fujiwara, but was later changed to Nikaidō because the family mansion was in Nikaidō. It is likely that he helped Muso because his temple would be erected in the area that had given its name to his family.

Musō, who during his life had the support of powerful figures like Emperor Go-Toba, ninth shikken Hōjō Sadatoki and eleventh shikken Hōjō Takatoki, chose this present location because he believed it was ideal for a Zen temple. In 1326 he moved from a temple called Nanpō-in near Engaku-ji to the Momijigayatsu Valley to direct the construction work. Founded in 1327 with the name Zuisen-in (瑞泉院), Zuisen-ji in its first version, completed in 1328, consisted of a temple to goddess Kannon (a Kannonden), a belvedere (the Henkai Ichirantei (遍界一覧亭)) and a Zen garden. After the fall of the Kamakura shogunate in 1333 Zuisen-ji came under the protection of the Ashikaga family. First Kantō kubō Ashikaga Motouji, son of Ashikaga Takauji, chose to be buried in it, thus starting a tradition. It was during that period and under his sponsorship that the name was changed and the temple assumed its finished form. In 1386 it was nominated first of the Kantō Jissetsu, a group of temples second in power only to the Five Mountain System. At the peak of its power it had several subtemples, including one dedicated to Ashikaga Takauji's mother and another to Ashikaga Motouji, but none of them has survived. Zuisen-ji as a whole was an important center of development of the Literature of the Five Mountains, and figures like Gidō Shūshin lived and worked here.

During the Edo period Tokugawa Mitsukuni had the temple restored and donated a wooden statue of Thousand-armed Kannon, Goddess of Mercy, meant to be housed in the belvedere as Zuisen-ji's main object of worship. The Shinpen Kamakurashi, a 1685 guide book to Kamakura commissioned by Mitsukuni which had great impact on the city's history, was written at the belvedere by Kawai Tsunehisa, Matsumura Kiyoyuki and Rikiishi Tadakazu.

The original building has, like the others, been lost, but the statue survives and is housed in the main hall of the temple.

== Features ==
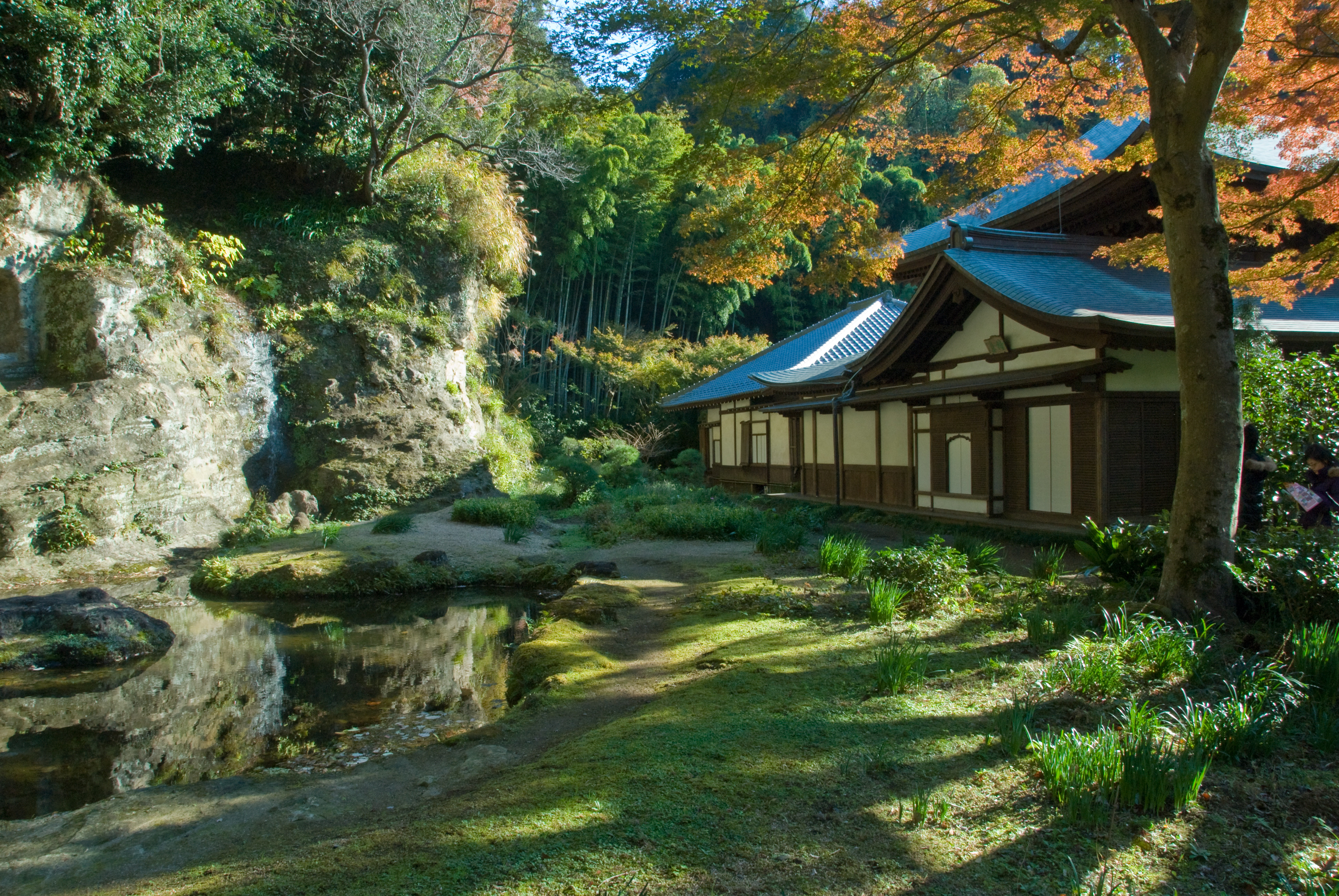
The Zen rock garden with the lake and the Butsuden

=== Yōan-ji ===
The narrow road that turns right before the ticket counter leads to a stele marking the spot where a temple called Yōan-ji (永安寺) used to stand. It was there that fourth kubō Ashikaga Mochiuji, who had rebelled against the shogunate, in 1439 made his last stand against shōgun Ashikaga Yoshinori's forces, finally disemboweling himself to avoid the shame of being taken prisoner. He is buried together with three other kubō in a small cemetery within Zuisen-ji (closed to the public). The stele reads:

When Kantō kubō Ashikaga Ujimitsu died on January 11, 1398, he was given the posthumous name Yōanji Hekizan Zenkō (永安寺壁山全公). His son Mitsukane built this temple giving it his father's posthumous name. The temple's oshō Dombo Ushūō was a follower of Musō Soseki. On March 24, 1439 kubō Mochiuji, descendant of Ujimitsu, fought here against shōgun Yoshinori, was defeated and disemboweled himself. The temple was burned and never rebuilt. This is where it stood.
Erected by the Kamakuramachi Seinendan in March 1926

=== Temple ===
The path to the temple then starts to climb the hill and divides in two. The path to the right is the original one built by Musō Soseki, and at its beginning stands a brown stone stele that remembers the fact (see photo).

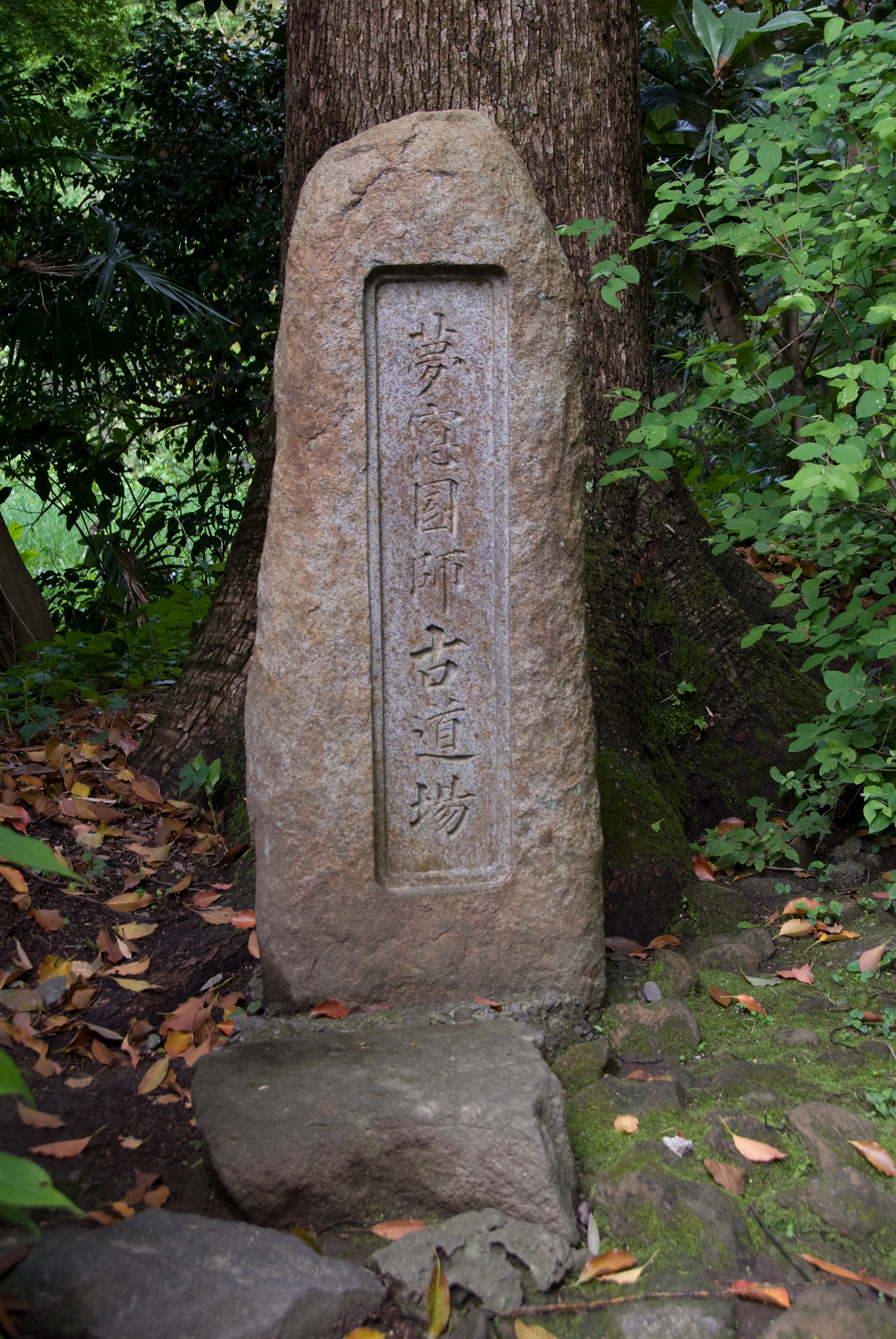
The stele at the beginning of Musō Soseki's old road

The temple's compound is now relatively small and its buildings are all new, with the exception of the kyakuden (客殿, reception hall), which was built during the early Edo period and was brought here from Yokohama's Kinzō-in (金蔵院) in 1963. The Henkai Ichirantei, the belvedere originally built by Musō Soseki from where one can see Mount Fuji, is out of sight in the back, beyond the Zen rock garden, and is closed to visitors.

Behind the temple there's a group of about 80 yagura, which are tombs typical of Kamakura consisting in caves dug in the rock. The group is known as the Zuisen-ji Yagura Group (瑞泉寺やぐら群).

Behind the main hall, the Zen rock garden was designed by Musō Soseki and consists of a pond with an arched bridge, a waterfall, a small island and a cave. It used to be surrounded by plants, but they were removed in 1969 to create the present landscape, which is faithful to the original blueprints. The stairs visible in its background go to the Ichirantei. The garden is a nationally designated Place of Scenic Beauty. The extreme simplicity of the Zen garden contrasts with the garden in front of the main hall, which is considered the most beautiful in Kamakura.

The temple's cemetery houses the tombs of many famous men of letters and intellectuals.

== Bibliography ==
- Harada, Hiroshi (2007). Kamakura no Koji (in Japanese). JTB Publishing. ISBN 978-4-533-07104-1.
- Kamakura Shōkō Kaigijo (2008). Kamakura Kankō Bunka Kentei Kōshiki Tekisutobukku (in Japanese). Kamakura: Kamakura Shunshūsha. ISBN 978-4-7740-0386-3.
- Kamiya, Michinori (2008). Fukaku Aruku — Kamakura Shiseki Sansaku Vol. 1 & 2 (in Japanese). Kamakura: Kamakura Shunshūsha. ISBN 978-4-7740-0340-5. OCLC 169992721.
- Mansfield, Stephen (2011). Japan's Master Gardens - Lessons in Space and Environment (Hardback). Tokyo, Rutland, Singapore: Tuttle. ISBN 978-4-8053-1128-8.
- Nihon Rekishi Chimei Taikei (日本歴史地名大係), online version. "Zuisenji" (in Japanese). Heibonsha. Archived from the original on 2008-11-07.
- Shirai, Eiji (1976). Kamakura Jiten (in Japanese). Tōkyōdō Shuppan. ISBN 4-490-10303-4.
- Shin'ichirō Takahashi (2005). Buke no koto, Kamakura (in Japanese). Tokyo: Yamakawa Shuppansha. ISBN 4-634-54210-2.
- Yasuda, Motohisa, ed. (1990). Kamakura, Muromachi Jinmei Jiten. Tokyo: Shin Jinbutsu Ōraisha. ISBN 978-4-404-01757-4. OCLC 24654085.
