= Yūki Kassen Ekotoba =

The Yūki Kassen Ekotoba (結城合戦絵詞) is a 15th-century scroll containing both text and illustrations describing Ashikaga Mochiuji's seppuku and Yūki Ujitomo's rebellion against shōgun Ashikaga Yoshinori (the Yūki War). It is 28.80 cm long, 378.20 cm wide. The scroll is an Important Cultural Property.

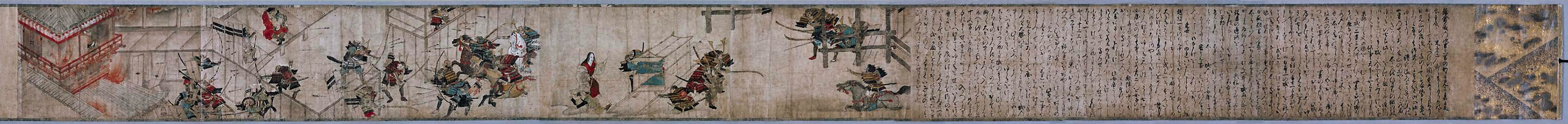
The Yūki Kassen Ekotoba
- Media related to Yūki Kassen Ekotoba (結城合戦絵詞) at Wikimedia Commons
