= Hosokawa Yoriyuki =

Hosokawa samurai and government minister

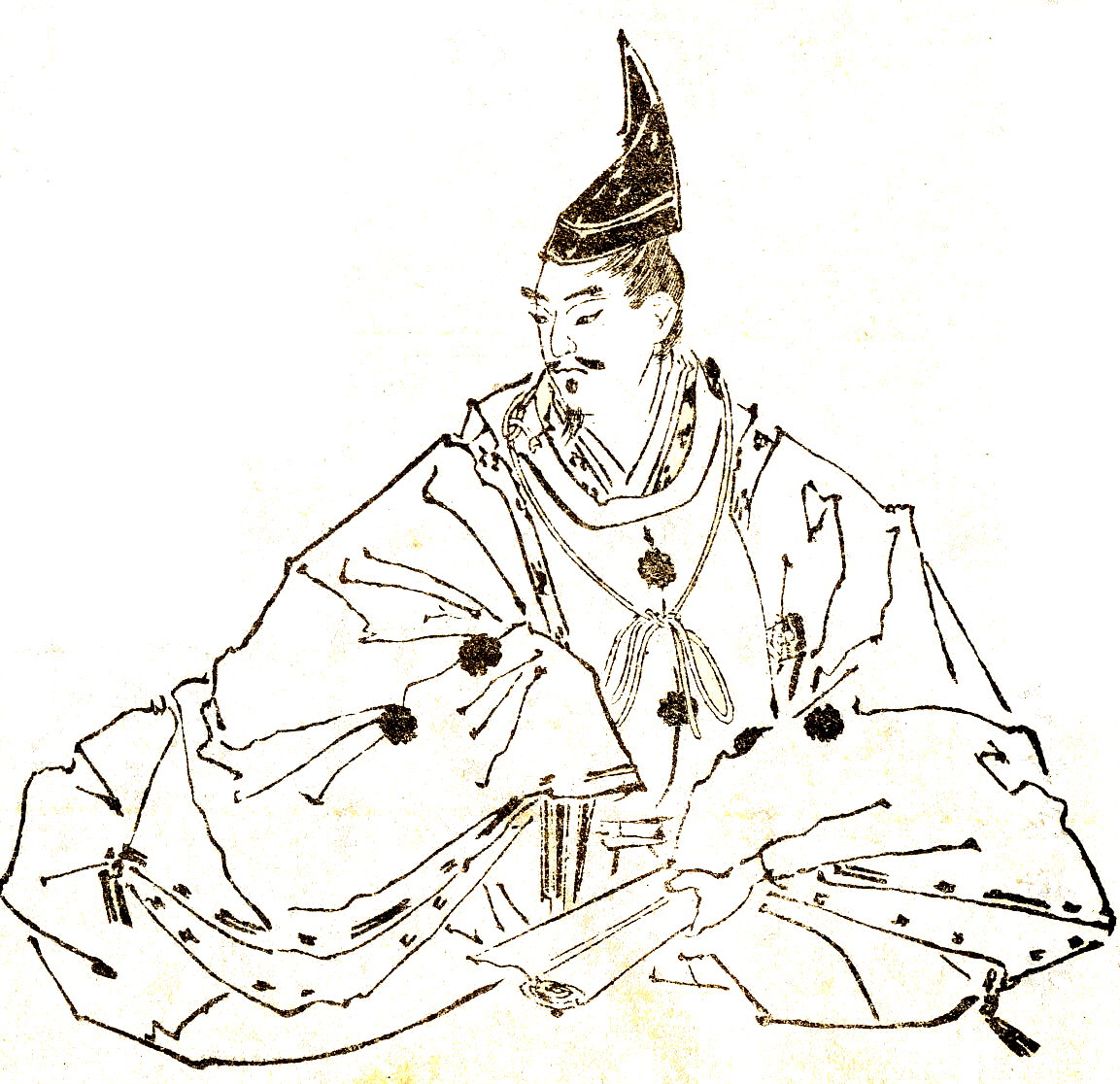
Hosokawa Yoriyuki by Kikuchi Yōsai

Hosokawa Yoriyuki (細川 頼之; 1329 – March 25, 1392) was a samurai of the Hosokawa clan, and prominent government minister under the Ashikaga shogunate, serving as Kyoto Kanrei (Shōgun's Deputy in Kyoto) from 1367 to 1379. The first to hold this post, he solidified the power of the shogunate, as well as elements of its administrative organization. He was also Constable (Shugo) of the provinces of Sanuki, Tosa, and Settsu. His childhood name was Yakuro (弥九郎).

== Career ==
The son of Hosokawa Yoriharu, Yoriyuki served the shogunate as a military commander, and fought the Yamana clan, and ultimately achieved victory over them in 1361. He commanded shogunal forces in a number of battles, and while serving under Shōgun Ashikaga Yoshiakira, Yoriyuki killed his cousin, Hosokawa Kiyouji, who had defected to the other side.

Yoriyuki was appointed Shōgun's Deputy in 1367, when Yoshiakira was very ill; on his deathbed, Yoshiakira entrusted Yoriyuki with the care of his son Yoshimitsu. Ashikaga Yoshimitsu became shōgun the following year, at the age of ten. For the next six years, Yoriyuki served as his chief minister. The "government under his guidance was stern and just, and unruly vassals were subjected to a discipline not unlike that of the Hōjō Regency in its prime". Inspired by the policies of the Kenmu era of thirty years earlier, Yoriyuki sought to introduce and maintain discipline and loyalty among the various samurai families and to suppress forces of dissent. To that end, he promulgated sumptuary laws, placing strict guidelines on the kinds of luxury items samurai could wear, and certain extravagant customs, such as the exchanging of New Year's gifts. When Yoshimitsu came of age, he would reject notions of frugality, and would take issue with Yoriyuki over this particular element of policy; Yoshimitsu's retirement villa, the gold-covered Kinkaku-ji, serves as a good example of the degree to which he did not care for thrift.

To further encourage the loyalty of the most powerful clans at Court, Yoriyuki created the post of Kanrei (the shōgun's deputy had previously been called Shitsuji) and proposed that his family, the Hosokawa, should share the post with the Shiba and Hatakeyama clans, alternating appointments between the clans. He saw to the enforcement of the property rights of hereditary landlords, religious groups, and Imperial lands, seeking to extend the military and legal powers of the shogunate to protect these lands from being seized by force by roving warlords. Several of these warlords, associated with the former Deputy Kō no Moronao, had been issuing orders and edicts in the name of the shogunate; this, too, was put to an end.

Yoriyuki also saw to the development of the shogunate's administrative procedures. Under the previous two shoguns, affairs were largely handled personally, with very little organization or procedure. Under Yoriyuki's guidance, administrative methods were established, and the government's operations organized to a significant degree.

Though largely successful in increasing the power of the shogunate, and establishing modes of administrative organization, Yoriyuki eventually drew the ire of members of the other samurai families, who accused him of collecting power for himself. In 1379, he was asked by the shōgun to resign.

== Family ==
- Father: Hosokawa Yoriharu (1304–1352)
- Mother: Satozawa Zen'in
- Wife: Daughter of Priest Jomyoin
- Adopted Sons:
  - Hosokawa Yorimoto (1343–1397)
  - Hosokawa Motoyuki
