= Ashikaga Mitsukane =

3rd Kamakura Kubō of the Ashikaga shogunate

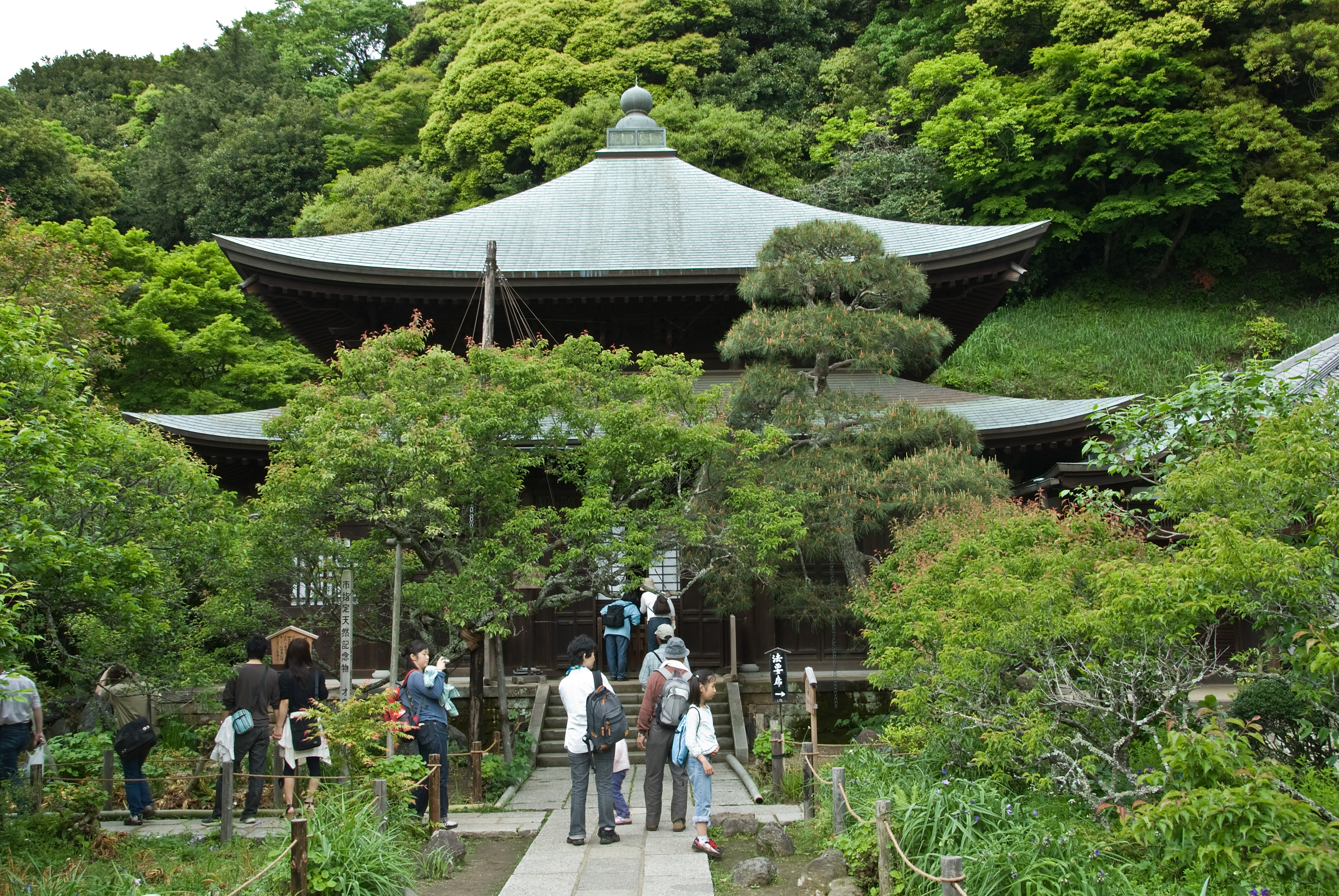
Ashikaga Mitsukane is buried at Kamakura's Zuisen-ji

Ashikaga Mitsukane (足利 満兼) (1378–1409) was a Nanboku-chō period warrior, and the Kamakura-fu's third Kantō kubō, (Shōgun Deputy). Being the eldest son, he succeeded his father Ujimitsu in 1398 at the age of 21 when he died during an epidemic. Like his father, Mitsukane aspired more or less openly to the shogunate and, like him and his successors, failed to obtain it. He died suddenly at the age of 32.

== Biography ==
In 1399, the year after taking power, Mitsukane dispatched his sons Mitsunao and Mitsusada to Mutsu Province's Sasagawa Gosho and Inamura Gosho to stabilize the situation in the region which, together with Dewa Province, his father had received in 1392 from shogun Ashikaga Yoshimochi as a reward for his support against the Yamana clan. This because he realized the importance of the area to control the whole Kantō region. In August of the same year he stayed himself in Southern Mutsu, returning to Kamakura only four months later. This increased immensely the support given by the Yūki Shirakawa family to his brothers, and therefore to himself.

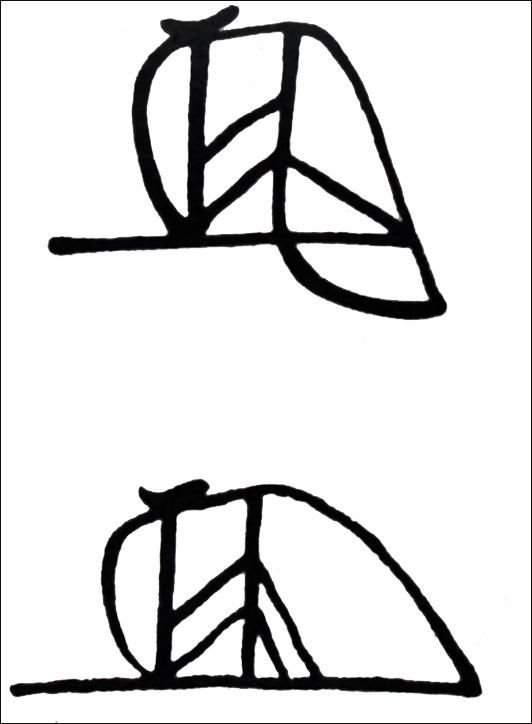
Two versions of Ashikaga Mitsukane's kaō (stylized signature)

In the same year, when Ōuchi Yoshihiro rebelled in Izumi in the Ōei Rebellion (応永の乱, Ōei no Ran), allying himself with the Southern Dynasty (see article Nanboku-chō period), he planned to join him in the hope of being able to replace his relative, shōgun Ashikaga Yoshimochi. The plan however failed because Ōuchi was immediately defeated. Partly because of Uesugi Norisada's advice, Mitsukane then gave up and returned to Kamakura. Because he had not given any help to the Ōuchi clan allowed him to feign innocence with Ashikaga Yoshimitsu (formally retired, but de facto ruler instead of his son Yoshimochi until his death), preventing an overt clash with Kyoto.

In a Shinto prayer (願文, ganbun) left at a Mishima Taisha in Izu, Mitsukane admits attacking superior forces, thanks Uesugi Norisada for his counsel, and swears to mend his ways and never to revolt again. It seems clear that at this stage he had abandoned all hope of prevailing over Kyoto. In 1400 Mitsukane swore fidelity to Yoshimitsu, and peace between Kamakura and Kyoto lasted until Mitsukane's death.

Date Masamune, ancestor of the more famous Tokugawa tozama, together with some allies had rebelled in Southern and Middle Mutsu against Kamakura, so in 1402 Mitsukane sent Uesugi Ujinori (the future Uesugi Zenshū) to quell the revolt. By that time, in Kyoto circulated a rumor that Mitsukane was insane. Whether the rumor had any basis is unclear but, in that case, it may well have been a consequence of his lack of success in defeating the shogunate. He died of natural causes at the age of 32. As his predecessors, he was buried at Kamakura's Zuisen-ji.

== See also ==
- Kamakura – The Muromachi and Edo periods
- The article Nanboku-chō period

Preceded by Ashikaga Ujimitsu	The five Kantō Kubō; Ashikaga Mitsukane; 1398–1409	Succeeded by Ashikaga Mochiuji
