= Ashikaga Motouji =

1st Kamakura Kubō of the Ashikaga shogunate

- 足利基氏
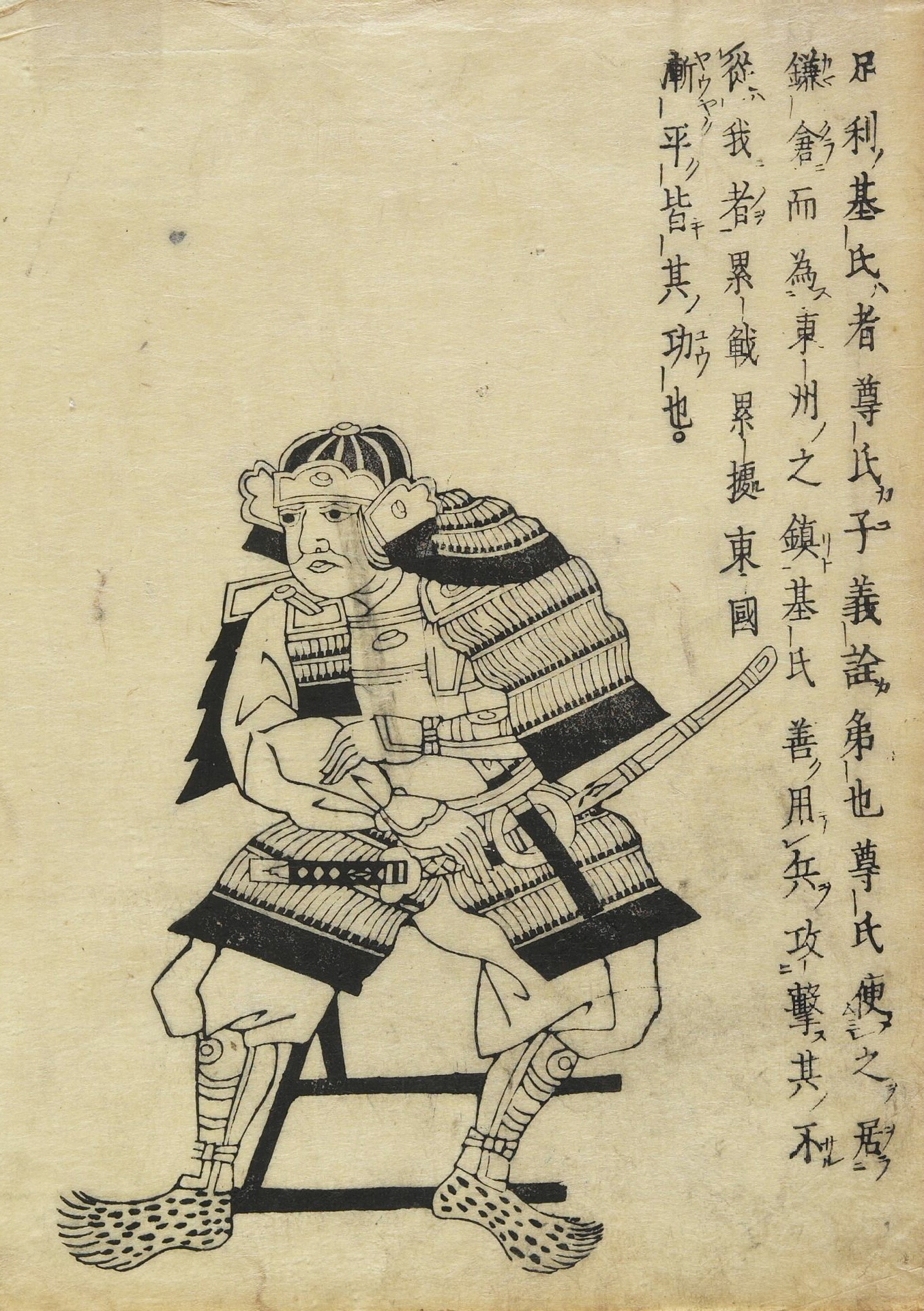
- Born: 1340
- Died: 1367 (aged 26–27); Kamakura
- Burial place: Zuisen-ji
- Military career
- Allegiance: Ashikaga shogunate (足利幕府)
- Commands: Kantō kubō (Deputy shōgun of the Kantō region)

Ashikaga Motouji (足利基氏; 1340–1367) was a Japanese samurai lord of the Nanboku-chō period. The fourth son of shogun Ashikaga Takauji, he was the first of a dynasty of five Kantō kubō, Kamakura-based representatives in the vital Kamakura-fu of Kyoto's Ashikaga regime. Meant to stabilize a volatile situation in the Kantō, a region where many warrior clans wanted the return of the shogunate from Kyoto back to Kamakura, the dynasty he started almost immediately developed the ambition to usurp the shogunate, becoming a serious problem for the central government. Motouji was the only kubō who always remained loyal to the Kyoto government. During the Kannō disturbance, a historical episode with serious repercussions on his life, he tried to reconcile his father with his uncle Ashikaga Tadayoshi and, after his father's demise, he collaborated with his elder brother, shogun Ashikaga Yoshiakira, to stabilize the shogunate. He died young during an epidemic.

== Background ==
Motouji's childhood name was Ikuō (光王) and later become Kamewakamaru (亀若丸). In the first weeks of 1336, (Note: Gregorian date obtained directly from the original Nengō using Nengocalc Archived 2007-09-30 at the Wayback Machine: (Kenmu era, 1st month)) two years after the fall of Kamakura, the first of the Ashikaga shoguns Ashikaga Takauji left the city for Kyoto in pursuit of Nitta Yoshisada. He left behind his 4-year-old son Yoshiakira as his representative in the trust of three guardians: Hosokawa Kiyouji, Uesugi Noriaki, and Shiba Ienaga. This action however formally divided the country in two, giving the east and the west two separate administrations with similar authority and powers.

In 1349 Takauji called Yoshiakira to Kyoto to take his brother Tadayoshi's place, replacing him in Kamakura with another of his sons, Motouji, to whom he gave the title of Kantō kanrei, or "Kantō deputy". Because the kanrei was the son of the shōgun, ruled Kantō and controlled the military forces there, the area was usually called Kamakura Bakufu or Kamakura shogunate, and Motouji shogun or Kamakura/Kantō Gosho, an equivalent title. When later the habit of calling kubō the shōgun spread from Kyoto to the Kantō, the ruler of Kamakura came to be called Kamakura kubō. The kanrei title was passed on to the Uesugi hereditary shitsuji. However, the first time the Kanto Kubō title appears in writing is in a 1382 entry of the Tsurugaoka Jishoan (鶴岡事書安), after Motouji's death.

== Family ==
- Father: Ashikaga Takauji
- Mother: Akahashi Toshi (1306–1365)
- Wife: Seiken'in
- Son: Ashikaga Ujimitsu (1359–1398)

== Career ==
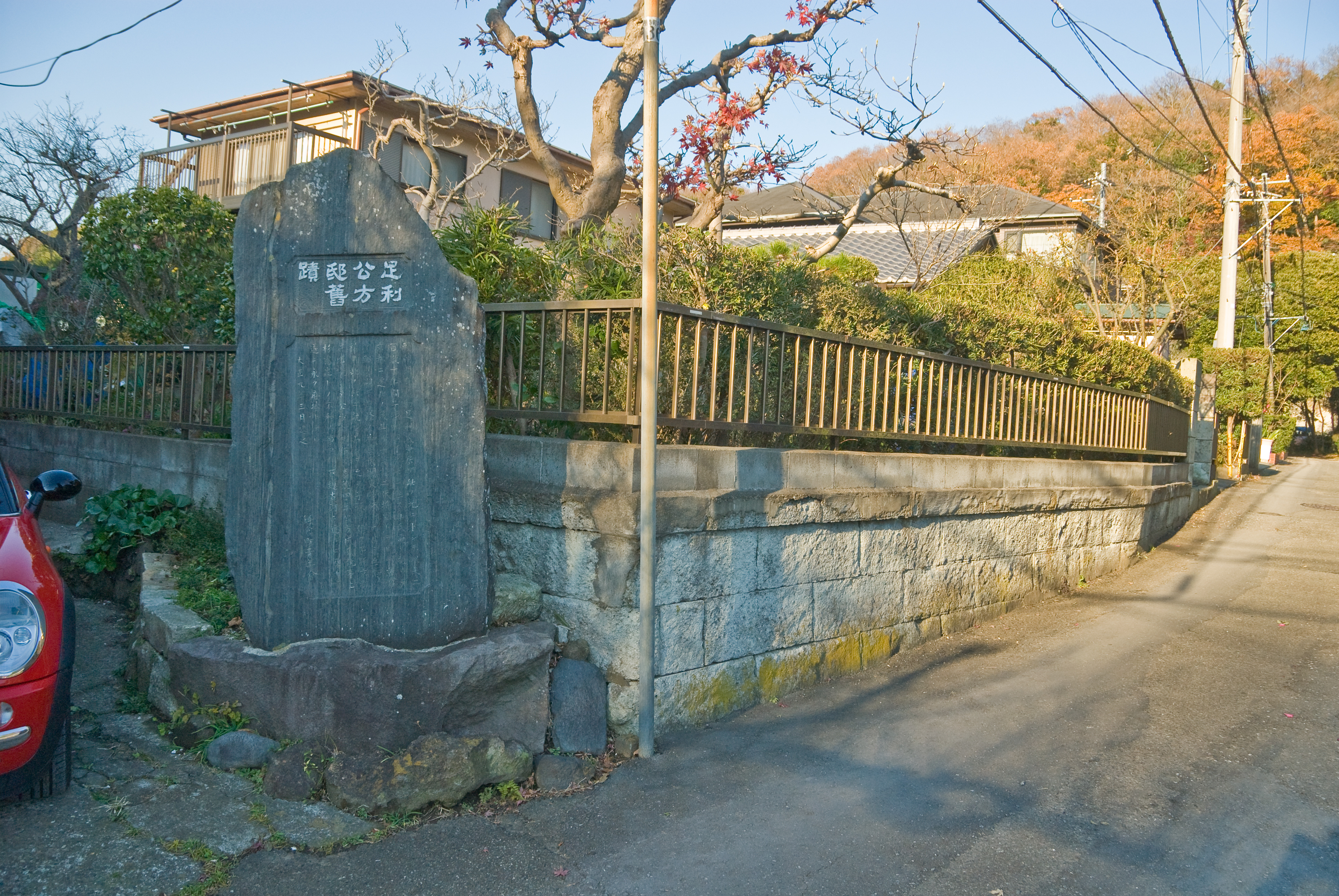
The stele that marks the spot in Kamakura where the kubō's mansion used to stand

In 1349 Takauji sent Motouji to the Kantō to replace Yoshiakira, solidify his power and protect his interests there. Motouji and all the Kantō Kubō that followed him resided in the Ashikaga clan's family mansion in today's Jōmyōji neighborhood in the east of Kamakura. At the location now stands a black memorial stele, whose inscription reads:

After Minamoto no Yoritomo founded his shogunate, Ashikaga Yoshikane (Note: Head of the Ashikaga clan) made this place his residence. His descendants also resided here for well over 200 years thereafter. After Ashikaga Takauji became shōgun and moved to Kyoto, his son and second shōgun Yoshiakira decided to also live there. Yoshiakira's younger brother Motouji then became Kantō kanrei and commanded his army from here. This became a tradition for all of the Ashikaga that followed. They, after Kyoto's fashion, gave themselves the title kubō. In 1455 kubō Ashikaga Shigeuji, after clashing with Uesugi Noritada, moved to Ibaraki's Shimōsa Province and the residence was demolished.

Erected in March 1918 by the Kamakurachō Seinendan

Location: Jōmyōji 4-2-25, near Nijinohashi Bridge.

Since Motouji was then just a child, real power was in the hands of two shitsuji Uesugi Noriaki and Kō no Morofuyu, men Takauji trusted.

However, the following year Uesugi, together with Takauji's brother Ashikaga Tadayoshi, defected and allied himself with Emperor Go-Daigo of the Southern Court, a sworn enemy of the Ashikaga, and left Kamakura for Kōzuke Province. Kō remained faithful to Motouji, but was killed in battle by Uesugi at Kai. Takauji responded running to Kamakura, defeating his brother's forces, and taking him prisoner. Tadayoshi died later, probably of poisoning. In 1352 Nitta Yoshioki and Yoshimune (both sons of Nitta Yoshisada) took Kamakura, and Motouji had to escape. Once again, Takauji had to come to his son's succor to restore order. The situation having stabilized, Takauji returned to Kyoto, leaving Hatakeyama Kunikiyo as the new shitsuji.

After Takauji's death, Nitta Yoshioki meant to attack Kamakura again, but Motouji had him caught and drowned in a river in 1358. With the Kantō finally peaceful, Motouji sent troops commanded by Hatakeyama Kunikiyo to help his brother Yoshiakira attack Yoshino Province, where Go-Daigo had installed his court, but was betrayed by Kunikiyo, who disobeyed orders and instead went to attack Nitta Yoshinaga. He personally defeated Kunikiyo, then reconciled himself with Uesugi Noriaki in 1364 and reinstated him to his former post. Because Noriaki had sided with Ashikaga Tadayoshi during the Kannō disturbance, this act is believed to have done much to pacify the Kantō.

Motouji died during an epidemic in 1367 at the age of 28 while firmly in power. He is buried at the family temple of Zuisen-ji.

== Notes ==
Preceded by _____	The five Kantō kubō Ashikaga Motouji; 1349–1367	Succeeded by Ashikaga Ujimitsu
