= Ashikaga Ujimitsu =

2nd Kamakura Kubō of the Ashikaga shogunate

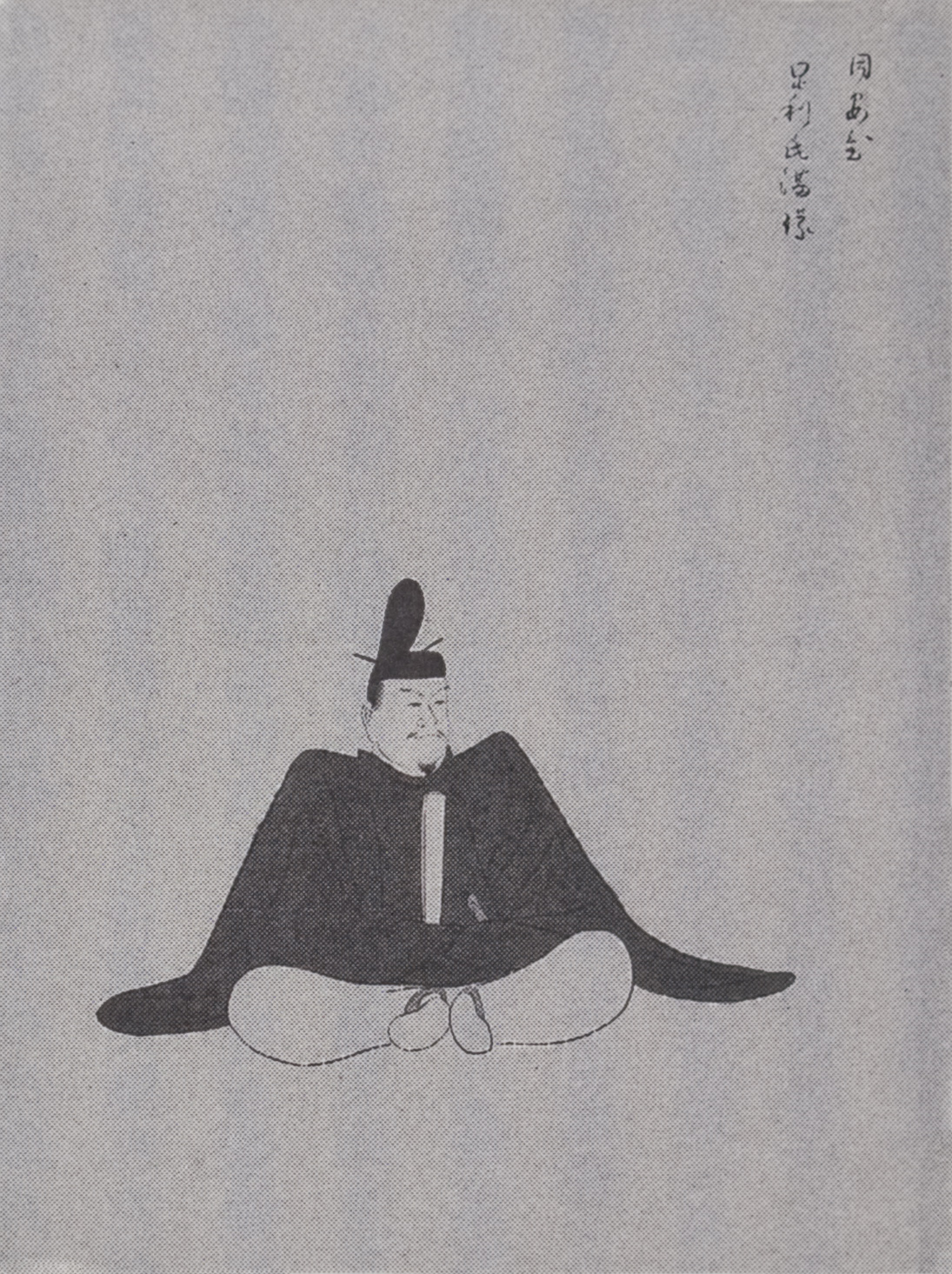
Second Kantō Kubō Ashikaga Ujimitsu

Ashikaga Ujimitsu (足利氏満) (1359–1398) was a Nanboku-chō period warrior and the Kamakura-fu's second Kantō kubō, or Shōgun Deputy. Son of first Kantō Kubō Ashikaga Motouji, he succeeded his father in 1367 at the age of nine when this last suddenly died during an epidemic. It was during his reign that the Kanto kubō title became common enough to appear for the first time in writing. It is in fact contained in a 1382 entry of the Tsurugaoka Jishoan (鶴岡事書安). This title was in itself rebellious, because it was first adopted by Takauji himself and its use therefore implied equality with the shogun. In fact, sometimes the Kanto Kubō was called Kantō shōgun.

Ujimitsu was the first Kantō kubō to openly aspire to the shogunate, and his relationship with shōgun Ashikaga Yoshimitsu in Kyoto consequently deteriorated to the point of being likened to that of "cats and dogs".

== Biography ==
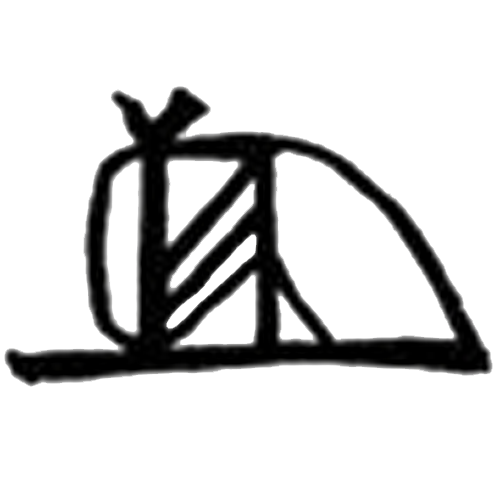
Ashikaga Ujimitsu's signature (kaō)

Ujimitsu became Kantō Kubō at the age of nine when his father suddenly died at the age of 29 during an epidemic. Because of his extremely young age, he was given Uesugi Noriaki as a regent and Rinzai Zen priest Gidō Shūshin as a tutor. (Noriaki however died the following year and was replaced by his son Yoshinori.) Immediately after Ujimitsu's accession to power, Uesugi Noriaki left Kamakura for Kyoto to represent the Kantō kubō at Ashikaga Yoshimitsu's accession ceremony. Taking advantage of his absence, some Musashi families, led by the Kawagoe and the Takasaka clans, revolted against Ashikaga rule in the so-called Hei Revolt (平一揆, Hei Ikki), and were soon joined by Shimotsuke Province's Utsunomiya clan. The Uesugi however remained faithful and defeated the coalition.

Ujimitsu worked continuously to define and solidify the structures of the Kamakura Bakufu he had inherited. Having gained full control of Kantō, he then conceived the idea of becoming shōgun, taking advantage of the fact that shōgun Yoshimitsu was busy subduing Kyūshū. He however over the years abandoned the idea after Uesugi Noriharu committed seppuku in protest and he came to realize his lack of reliable support from other clans like the Toki and the Kyōgoku. He ordered a campaign against Oyama Yoshimasa, a Kantō supporter of the Southern Court against the Ashikaga, who had revolted. Although Yoshimasa was defeated and killed in 1382, the fight against the Oyama clan continued for Ujimitsu's entire life. In 1391 he allied himself with shōgun Yoshimitsu against the Yamana clan and, although the campaign ended before he could participate, he was nonetheless rewarded with the Mutsu and Dewa Provinces.

Ujimitsu never completely abandoned the ambition to become shōgun, and gradually his relationship with shogun Yoshimitsu worsened to the point of being described as one of open enmity. The fact he didn't have to suffer the consequences of the situation is probably due to the good offices of his childhood tutor Gidō Shūshin who, being in Kyoto, could intercede for him with Yoshimitsu, but also to the mediation of the Uesugi and to his work against the Oyama clan, which had served the interests of the Ashikaga's Kansai branch.

He died at the age of 41 and was buried at a Rinzai temple near Kamakura called Yōan-ji (永安寺), later incorporated in Zuisen-ji). This is the same temple where in his grandson Mochiuji, defeated in 1439 by Kyoto's army, would commit seppuku disembowel himself to avoid the shame of capture.

On the spot near Zuisen-ji where Yōan-ji used to be stands a stele, which reads:

When Kantō kubō Ashikaga Ujimitsu died on January 11, 1398, he was given the posthumous name Yōanji Hekizan Zenkō (永安寺壁山全公). His son Mitsukane built this temple and gave it his father's posthumous name. The temple's oshō Dombo Ushūō was a follower of Musō Soseki. On March 24, 1439 kubō Mochiuji, a descendant of Ujimitsu, fought here against shōgun Yoshinori, was defeated and disemboweled himself. The temple was burned and never rebuilt. This is where it stood.
Erected by the Kamakuramachi Seinendan in March 1926

== See also ==
- Kamakura – The Muromachi and Edo periods
- Nanboku-chō period

Preceded by Ashikaga Motouji	The five Kantō kubō Ashikaga Ujimitsu; 1367–1398	Succeeded by Ashikaga Mitsukane
