= Ashikaga Mochiuji =

Fourth Kantō kubō during the Sengoku period

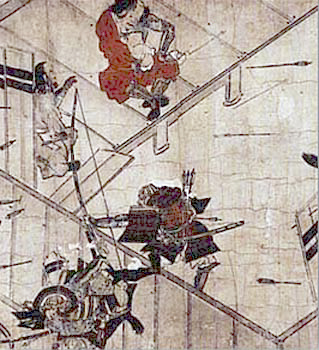
Ashikaga Mochiuji disembowels himself at Yōan-ji, near Kamakura (from the Yūki Kassen Ekotoba)

Ashikaga Mochiuji (足利持氏, 1398–1439) was the Kamakura-fu's fourth Kantō kubō during the Muromachi period (15th century) in Japan. During his long and troubled rule the relationship between the west and the east of the country reached an all-time low. Kamakura was finally attacked by shōgun Ashikaga Yoshinori and retaken by force. Mochiuji and his eldest son Yoshihisa killed themselves to escape capture.

== Biography ==
Mochiuji became Kubō while still a child after his father died suddenly of a disease. His violent and abrasive character from the beginning caused widespread resentment among his vassals. After disagreements with Mochiuji, his kanrei Uesugi Zenshū organized a rebellion against him (the so-called Zenshū no Ran) with the aid of nearly half the daimyōs in the northern and eastern provinces. Thanks to this support, Zenshū could take Kamakura and Mochiuji had to flee. However, despite his pursuing goals similar to those of the shogunate, Zenshū was after all rebelling against his lord, so the shogunate had no choice but to send troops to stop him. In 1417, Zenshū and his allies found themselves surrounded at Tsurugaoka Hachimangū and Zenshū killed himself.

After this took place, Mochiuji attacked Zenshū's allies, which included families as the Oda and the Takeda, along with a few noble families from Musashi Province. The Ashikaga themselves thought Mochiuji's actions to be too much, and shōgun Ashikaga Yoshinori in 1432 ordered his army to destroy Mochiuji. This led to Mochiuji and Yoshinori to battle it out during the Eikyō Rebellion in 1438. In the end, Yoshinori successfully put an end to Mochiuji's rebellion in 1439. Kamakura's Kubō committed seppuku at the temple of Yōan-ji, west of the city. The events in Kamakura however caused widespread resentment among Yoshinori's generals and one of them, Akamatsu Mitsusuke, murdered him.

== Yōan-ji ==
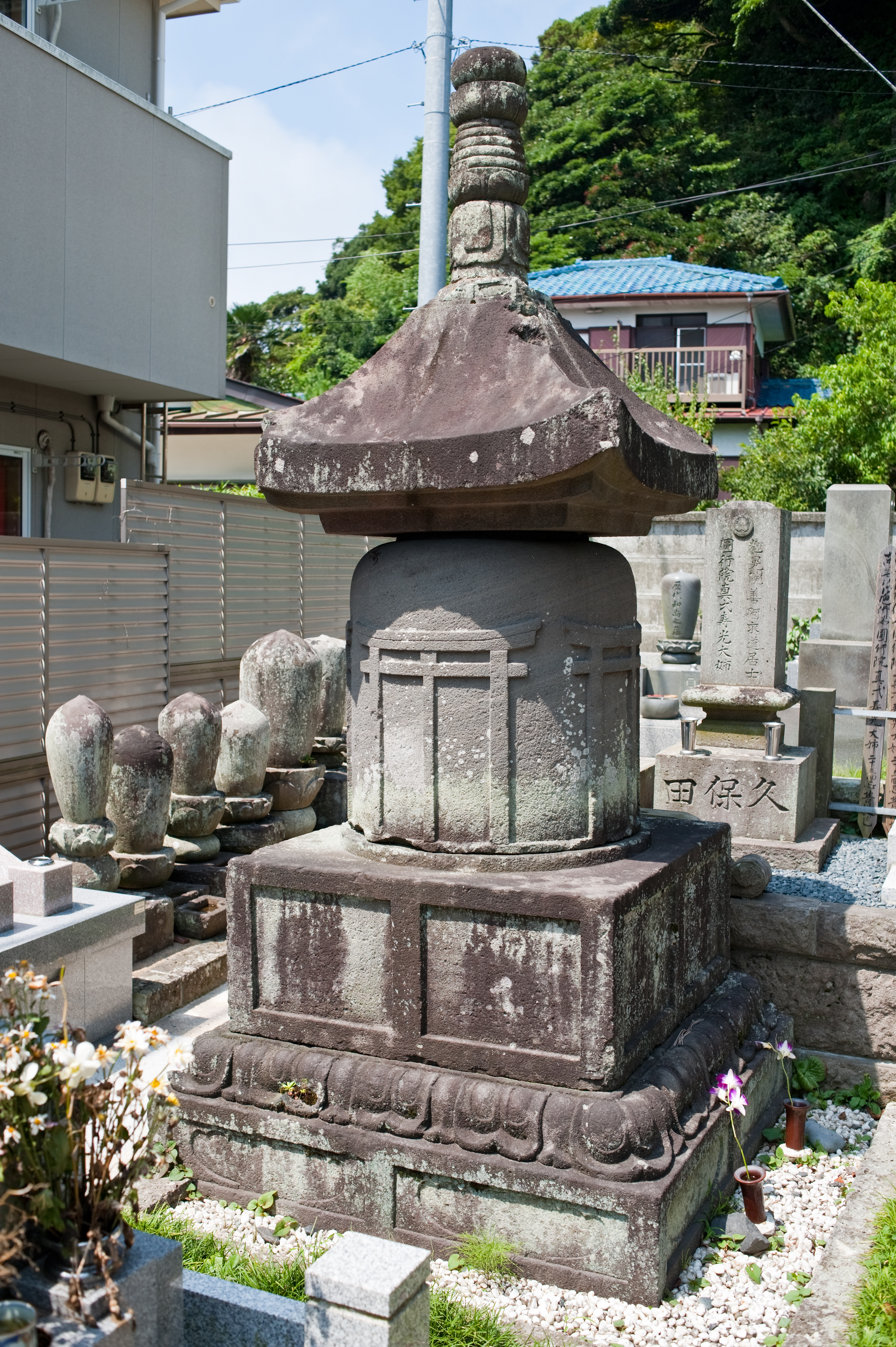
Ashikaga Mochiuji's hōtō at Betsugan-ji, Kamakura

The road that in Kamakura turns right before Zuisen-ji's ticket counter leads to a stele marking the spot where Yōan-ji (永安寺) used to stand. It was here that Mochiuji made his last stand against the shogunate, finally disemboweling himself to avoid the shame of being taken prisoner. He is buried together with three other kubō in a small cemetery within Zuisen-ji (closed to the public). The stele reads:

When Kantō Kubō Ashikaga Ujimitsu died on January 11, 1398, he was given the posthumous name Yōanji Hekizan Zenkō (永安寺壁山全公). His son Mitsukane built this temple and gave it his father's posthumous name. The temple's oshō Dombo Ushūō was a follower of Musō Soseki. On March 24, 1439, Kubō Mochiuji, a descendant of Ujimitsu, fought here against shōgun Yoshinori, was defeated and disemboweled himself. The temple was burned and never rebuilt. This is where it stood.
Erected by the Kamakuramachi Seinendan in March 1926

There is however also a 3.2 m stone hōtō (宝塔, "treasure stupa") traditionally supposed to be his grave also at Betsugan-ji, a former Ashikaga family temple in Ōmachi. On the stupa is carved the date 1439, the year of Mochiuji's death, however the tomb seems stylistically to belong rather to the precedent Kamakura period, and the attribution seems therefore dubious.

Mochiuji's eldest son Yoshihisa, 14 years old at the time, was also forced to kill himself at nearby Hōkoku-ji. His three younger sons however escaped to Nikkō and in 1440 were led by Yūki Ujitomo, head of the Yūki clan, to his castle in Koga, Shimōsa Province, and survived. When later his castle was attacked by the shogunate, they escaped. Two, Haruō-maru and Yasuō-maru, were caught and executed. The lone survivor, Mochiuji's fourth child Shigeuji, would later become the last Kantō kubō.

== See also ==
- Kantō kubō
- Kamakura – The Muromachi and Edo periods
- Uesugi Zenshū
- Yūki War

Preceded by Ashikaga Mitsukane	The five Kantō Kubō; Ashikaga Mochiuji; 1409–1439	Succeeded by Ashikaga Shigeuji
