= Uesugi Zenshū =

Chief advisor to Ashikaga Mochiuji, an enemy of the Ashikaga shogunate in feudal Japan

Uesugi Zenshū (上杉 禅秀; d. 1417), also known as Uesugi Ujinori, was the chief advisor to Ashikaga Mochiuji, an enemy of the Ashikaga shogunate in feudal Japan. When he was rebuked by Mochiuji in 1415 and forced to resign, Zenshū organized a rebellion.

Zenshū received aid for his rebellion from nearly half the daimyōs in the northern and eastern provinces, and took Kamakura. Mochiuji was forced to flee the city. However, despite pursuing similar goals to those of the shogunate (bakufu), Zenshū was still rebelling against his lord, and so the bakufu had no choice but to send troops to stop him. In 1417, Zenshū and his allies found themselves surrounded. They fled to Kamakura's Tsurugaoka Hachimangū, where Zenshū committed seppuku.

The rebellion did not end with Zenshū's death, however, and neither did Mochiuji's opposition to it. For more than five years, Mochiuji continued to attack Zenshū's allies, including the Oda clan, Takeda clan, and nobles of Musashi Province. Anger towards Mochiuji and his office only continued to grow, until the bakufu took action to stop him in 1423.
