= Shinpen Kamakurashi =

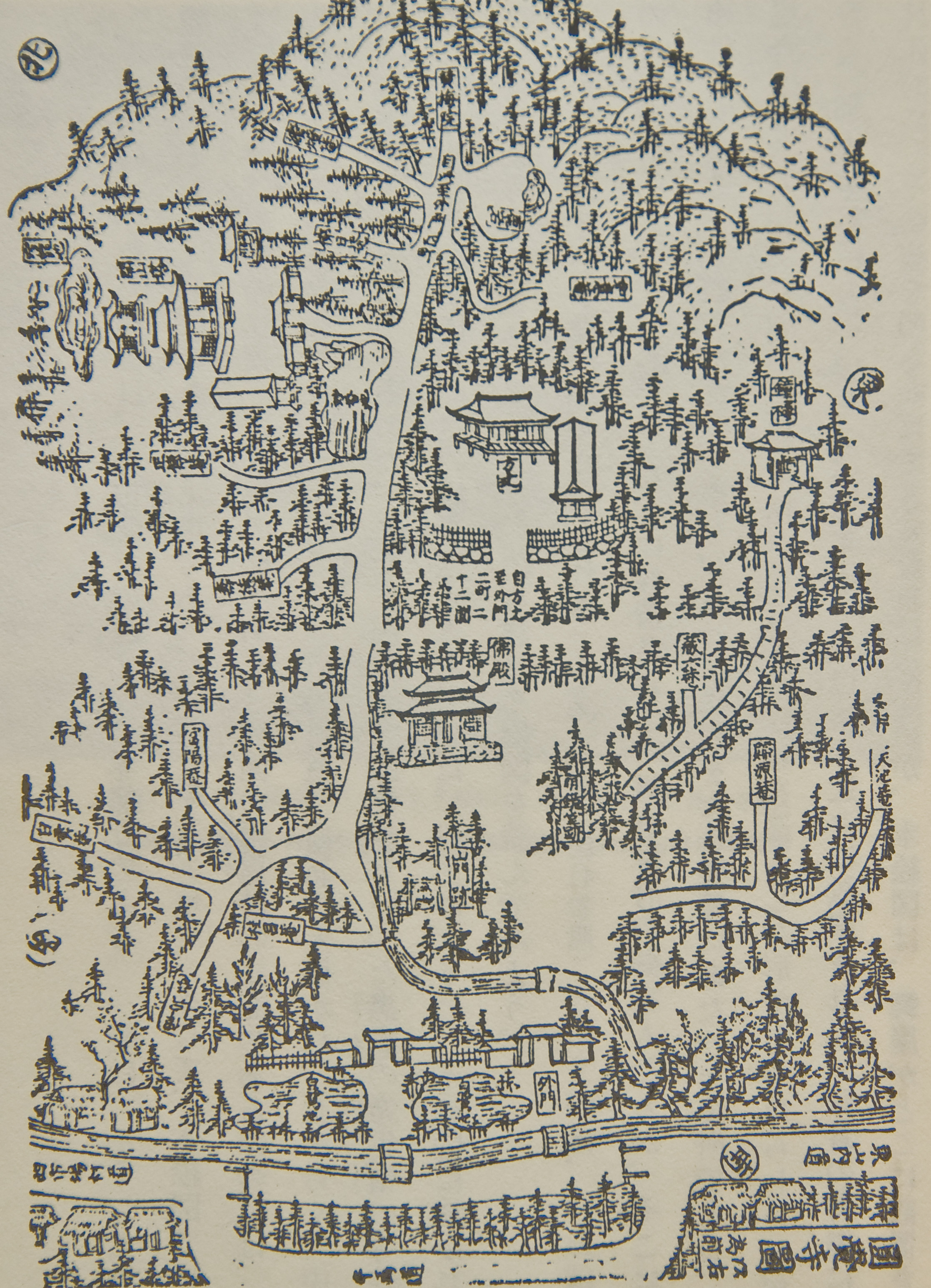
Engaku-ji in a drawing from the Shinpen Kamakurashi including the area around today's Kita-Kamakura Station.

The Shinpen Kamakurashi (新編鎌倉志, - Newly Edited Guide to Kamakura) is an Edo period compendium of topographic, geographic and demographic data concerning the city of Kamakura, Kanagawa Prefecture, Japan, and its vicinities. Consisting of eight volumes and commissioned in 1685 by Tokugawa Mitsukuni to three vassals, it contains for example information about "Kamakura's Seven Entrances", "Kamakura's Ten Bridges" and "Kamakura's Ten Wells". It includes illustrations, maps, and information about temples, ruins and place names etymologies not only about Kamakura, but also about Enoshima, Shichirigahama, Hayama and Kanazawa. The book created and popularized many of these "numbered" names, which were picked up by many subsequent tourist guides and became part of Kamakura's image. Each volume contains a day's worth of walking and is a real and effective guide to sightseeing. This makes the book a precious source of information to historians.

It is also the source of at least one Kamakura canard: it is often written that Kugyō, the Buddhist monk who in 1219 assassinated his uncle and shōgun Minamoto no Sanetomo, on the night of the murder was hiding behind the great ginkgo tree next to Tsurugaoka Hachiman-gū's senior shrine, but the Azuma Kagami, our main historic source on the event, simply says he came "from the side of the stone stairs" (石段の際). The detail of the ginkgo tree first appears in the Shinpen Kamakurashi.

It is believed the book was compiled using as a base the Kamakura Nikki (鎌倉日記), written in 1674 by Tokugawa Mitsukuni himself about Kamakura's famous places, shrines and temples. The book was written at Zuisen-ji, a Zen temple of the Engaku-ji school in Kamakura by Kawai Tsunehisa, Matsumura Kiyoyuki and Rikiishi Tadakazu.

Bibliographical Data:

- Shiraishi Tsutomu hen. (2003). Shinpen Kamakurashi. Tōkyō: Kyūko Shoin. ISBN 978-4-7629-4164-1.
