= Kanrei =

High political post in feudal Japan

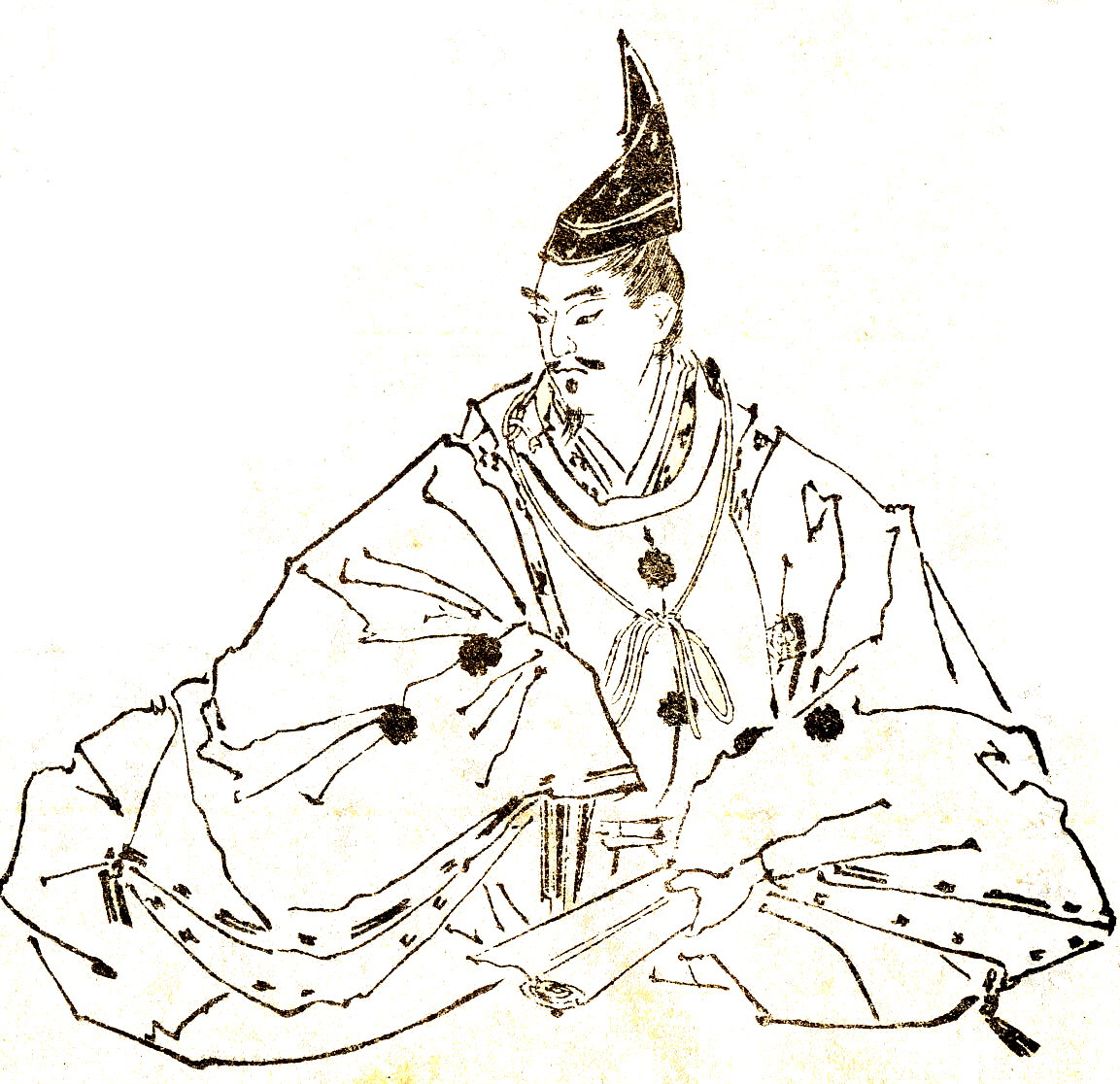
Hosokawa Yoriyuki

Kanrei (管領) or, more rarely, kanryō, was a high political post in feudal Japan; it is usually translated as shōgun's deputy. After 1349, there were actually two Kanrei, the Kyoto Kanrei and the Kantō Kanrei. But originally from 1219 until 1333, the post was synonymous with the Rokuhara Tandai, and was based in Kyoto. The Hōjō clan monopolized this post, and there were during this period two Deputies – a southern chief, and a northern chief. From 1336 to 1367, the Deputy was called Shitsuji (執事). The first to hold this title was Kō no Moronao.

Following the fall of the Kamakura shogunate and abolition of the Rokuhara Tandai position, both occurring in 1333, Ashikaga Takauji created the post of Kantō Kanrei, or Shogun's Deputy in the East (Kantō generally refers to the area around and including modern Tokyo).

In 1367, Hosokawa Yoriyuki was chosen by a council to become Deputy (Kyoto Kanrei). In order to ensure the loyalty of his colleagues, the Hatakeyama and Shiba clans, he proposed that three families share the position of Kanrei, alternating between them every time a new appointment was needed. Thus was born the San-Kan or Three Kanrei. However, in 1379, Yoriyuki's actions attracted the resentment of certain powerful lords, who pressed for his dismissal. After that, the Kyoto Kanrei no longer held the responsibilities of Shogun's Deputy, and merely carried out his orders in an advisory and executive position.

== Kantō Kanrei ==
In the first weeks of 1336 Ashikaga Takauji left Kamakura for Kyoto in pursuit of Nitta Yoshisada. He left behind his 4-year-old son Yoshiakira as his representative in the trust of three guardians: Hosokawa Kiyouji, Uesugi Noriaki, and Shiba Ienaga. In 1349 Takauji called Yoshiakira to Kyoto, replacing him with another of his sons, Motouji, to whom he gave the title of Kantō Kanrei. Because the kanrei was the son of the shōgun, ruled Kantō and controlled the military there, the area was usually called Kamakura Bakufu, or Kamakura shogunate, and Motouji Shogun or Kamakura/Kantō Gosho, an equivalent title. When later the habit of calling kubō the shogun spread from Kyoto to the Kantō, the ruler of Kamakura came to be called Kamakura kubō. The Kanrei title was then passed on to the Uesugi hereditary shitsuji (執事). Members of the Uesugi clan thereafter dominated the Kantō kanrei post until 1552, when it was abolished.

The political organization of the Ashikaga shogunate was complex, and shifted from time to time. The responsibilities and official title of the Kanrei or Deputy changed a number of times, as other positions were created or abolished. In addition, they worked alongside a number of other posts, such as the Kyūshū Tandai, who represented the shōgun's interests and orders in the southernmost of the main islands.

== Kyoto Kanrei ==
- Shitsuji
  - 1336–1349 Kō no Moronao (d. 1351)
  - 1349 Kō no Moroyo (d. 1351)
  - 1349–1351 Kō no Moronao (d. 1351)
  - 1351–1358 Niki Yoriaki (1299–1359)
  - 1358–1361 Hosokawa Kiyouji (d. 1362)
- Kanrei
  - 1362–1366 Shiba Yoshimasa (1350–1410)
  - 1368–1379 Hosokawa Yoriyuki (1329–1392)
  - 1379–1391 Shiba Yoshimasa (1350–1410)
  - 1391–1393 Hosokawa Yorimoto (1343–1397)
  - 1393–1398 Shiba Yoshimasa (1350–1410)
  - 1398–1405 Hatakeyama Motokuni (1352–1406)
  - 1405–1409 Shiba Yoshinori (1371–1418)
  - 1409–1410 Shiba Yoshiatsu (1397–1434)
  - 1410–1412 Hatakeyama Mitsuie (1372–1433)
  - 1412–1421 Hosokawa Mitsumoto (1378–1426)
  - 1421–1429 Hatakeyama Mitsuie (1372–1433)
  - 1429–1432 Shiba Yoshiatsu (1397–1434)
  - 1432–1442 Hosokawa Mochiyuki (1400–1442)
  - 1442–1445 Hatakeyama Mochikuni (1398–1455)
  - 1445–1449 Hosokawa Katsumoto (1430–1473)
  - 1449–1452 Hatakeyama Mochikuni (1398–1455)
  - 1452–1464 Hosokawa Katsumoto (1430–1473)
  - 1464–1467 Hatakeyama Masanaga (1442–1493)
  - 1467–1468 Shiba Yoshikado
  - 1468–1473 Hosokawa Katsumoto (1430–1473)
  - 1473 Hatakeyama Masanaga (1442–1493)
  - 1478–1486 Hatakeyama Masanaga (1442–1493)
  - 1486 Hosokawa Masamoto (1466–1507)
  - 1486–1487 Hatakeyama Masanaga (1442–1493)
  - 1487–? Hosokawa Masamoto (1466–1507)
  - 1490 Hosokawa Masamoto (1466–1507)
  - 1495–1507 Hosokawa Masamoto (1466–1507)
  - 1508–1525 Hosokawa Takakuni (1484–1531)
  - 1525 Hosokawa Tanekuni
  - 1527 Hatakeyama Yoshitaka (d. 1532)
  - 1536 Hosokawa Harumoto (1519–1563)
  - 1546 Rokkaku Sadayori (1495–1552)
  - 1552–1564 Hosokawa Ujitsuna (d. 1564)
