= Tomb of Minamoto no Yoritomo =

Monument in Kamakura, Kanagawa, Japan

Coordinates: 35°19′34.40″N 139°33′39.98″E

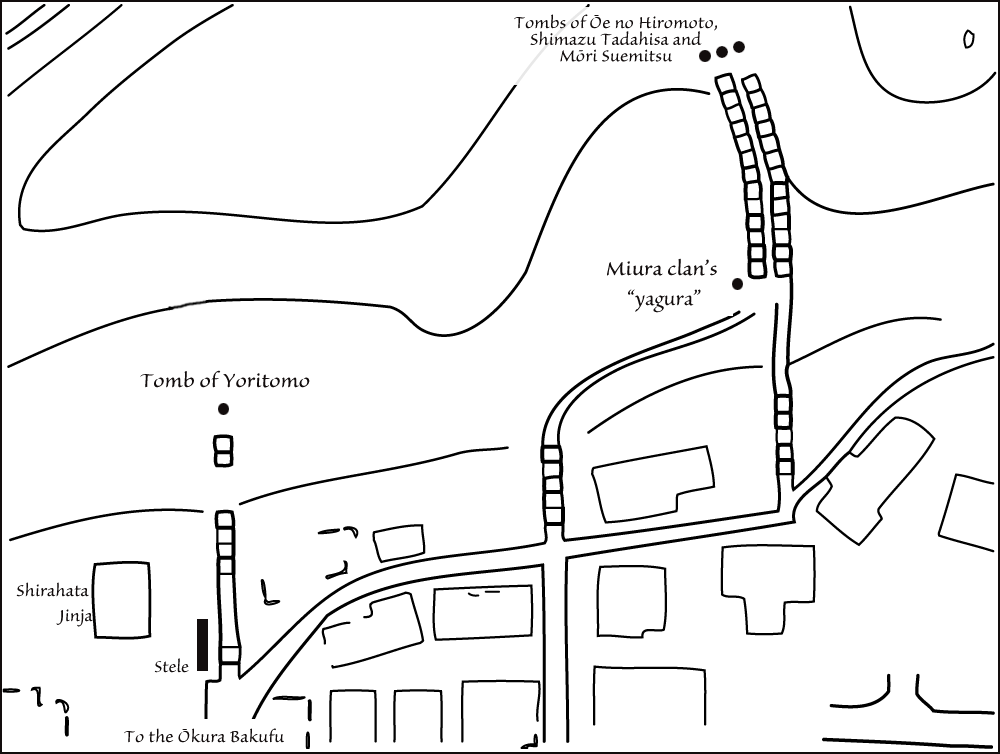
The tomb of Minamoto no Yoritomo and its surroundings

The tomb of Minamoto no Yoritomo (源頼朝の墓) (see photo below) is a monument in Kamakura, Kanagawa, Japan, located some hundred meters north of the site where the palace called Ōkura Bakufu, seat of Minamoto no Yoritomo's government, once stood. Although there is no evidence his remains are actually there, it is commonly assumed to be the resting place of Minamoto no Yoritomo, founder and first shōgun of the Kamakura shogunate. The cenotaph consists of a 186 cm gorintō (a Buddhist stone stupa) surrounded by a stone tamagaki (a fence usually delimiting the sacred soil of a Shinto shrine), and was built during the Edo period (1603–1868), far after the shōgun's death in 1199. In the course of history, the site's prestige has attracted other structures, so that now it is occupied by the Site of the Hokke-dō, (the spot where Yoritomo's Hokke-dō, or funeral temple, used to stand during the Edo period), Shirahata Shrine (白幡神社, Shirahata Jinja) (not to be confused with the homonymous shrine part of Tsurugaoka Hachiman-gū), and the black stone stele commemorating the Hokke-dō and the mass suicide of the Miura clan. A couple of hundred meters further to the east lie the yagura (an artificial cave used during the Kamakura period as a grave or as a cenotaph) of the Miura clan, the twin tombs of Oe no Hiromoto and of his son Mōri Suemitsu, and the grave of Yoritomo's illegitimate son Shimazu Tadahisa. The grave of Yoritomo and the ruins of the Hokke-dō are national Historic Sites.

== History ==
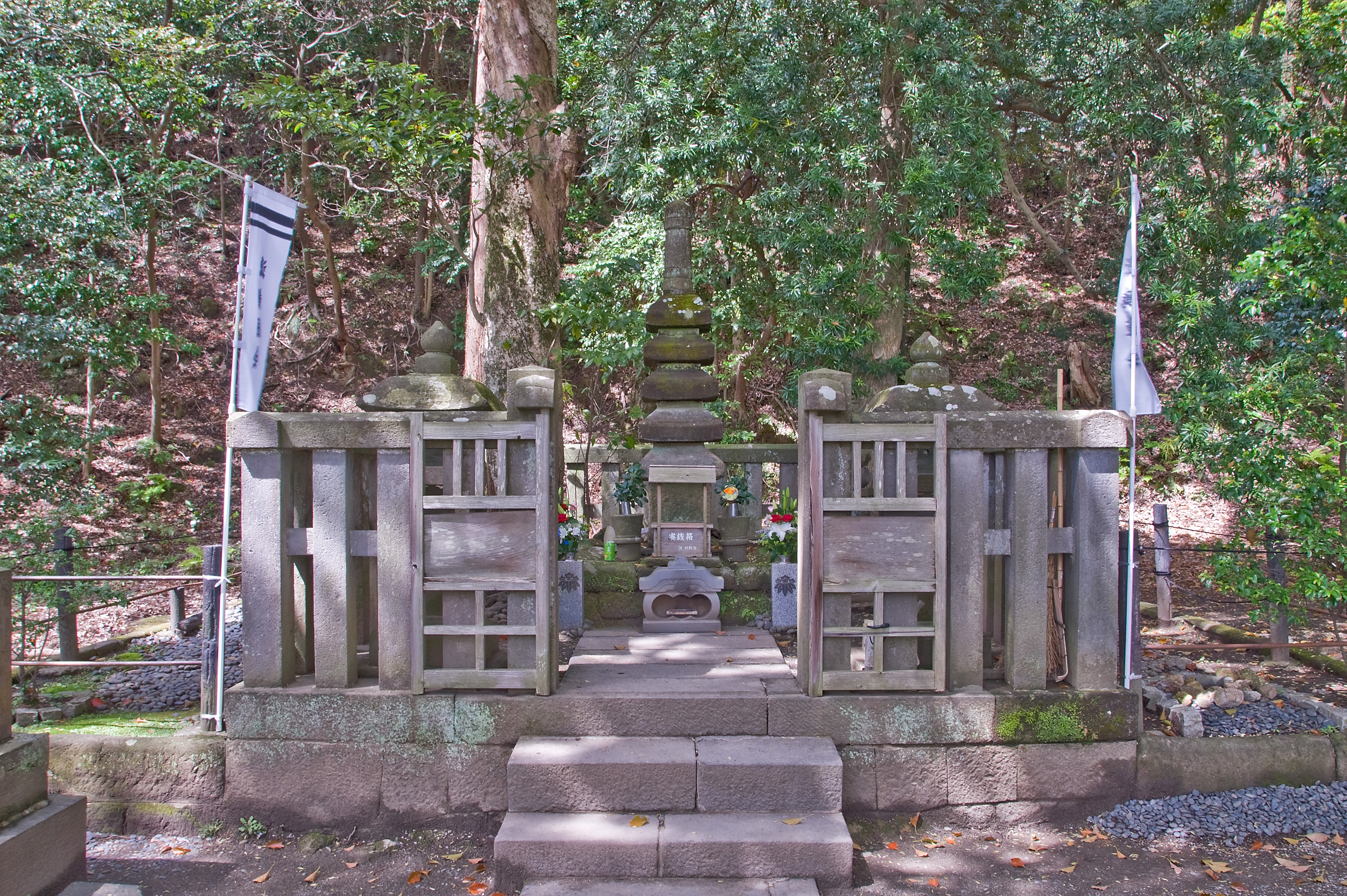
Yoritomo's grave today

When Yoritomo suddenly died falling from his horse on February 8, 1199 (Shōji era, 13th day of the first month) he was buried in a Buddhist temple on the side of a hill just north of his government's seat, the Ōkura Bakufu. The temple stood where the tomb of Yoritomo now is, and was moved elsewhere in the Edo period. The temple hadn't yet assumed the name it is now known under, but was simply Yoritomo's jibutsudō (持仏堂), the temple which enshrined his tutelary goddess Shō-Kannon. The name under which this area is now known, Nishi Mikado or "Western Gate", is itself a relic of the time in which it was just west of the shōgun's palace.

=== Remains of the Hokke-dō ===
The Hokke-dō was Yoritomo's personal temple, which was destroyed, moved and rebuilt several times in the course of its history and which is no longer extant. On the site where it used to stand before it was demolished in 1872 there are now a shrine called Shirahata Shrine and a stone stele which reads:

The Hokke-dō originally enshrined Yoritomo's tutelary goddess [Shō-Kannon] but, after his death, was turned into his grave. When in June 1217 (Kempō 5, 5th month) Wada Yoshimori rebelled and set the Ōkura Bakufu on fire, this is where shōgun Sanetomo found refuge. Also, on August 7, 1247 (Hōji 1, 5th day of the 6th month), Miura Yasumura barricaded in here to resist the onslaught of Hōjō forces, but was defeated. He therefore gathered 500 members of his clan and committed with them mass suicide, dyeing the ground in red and black with their blood.

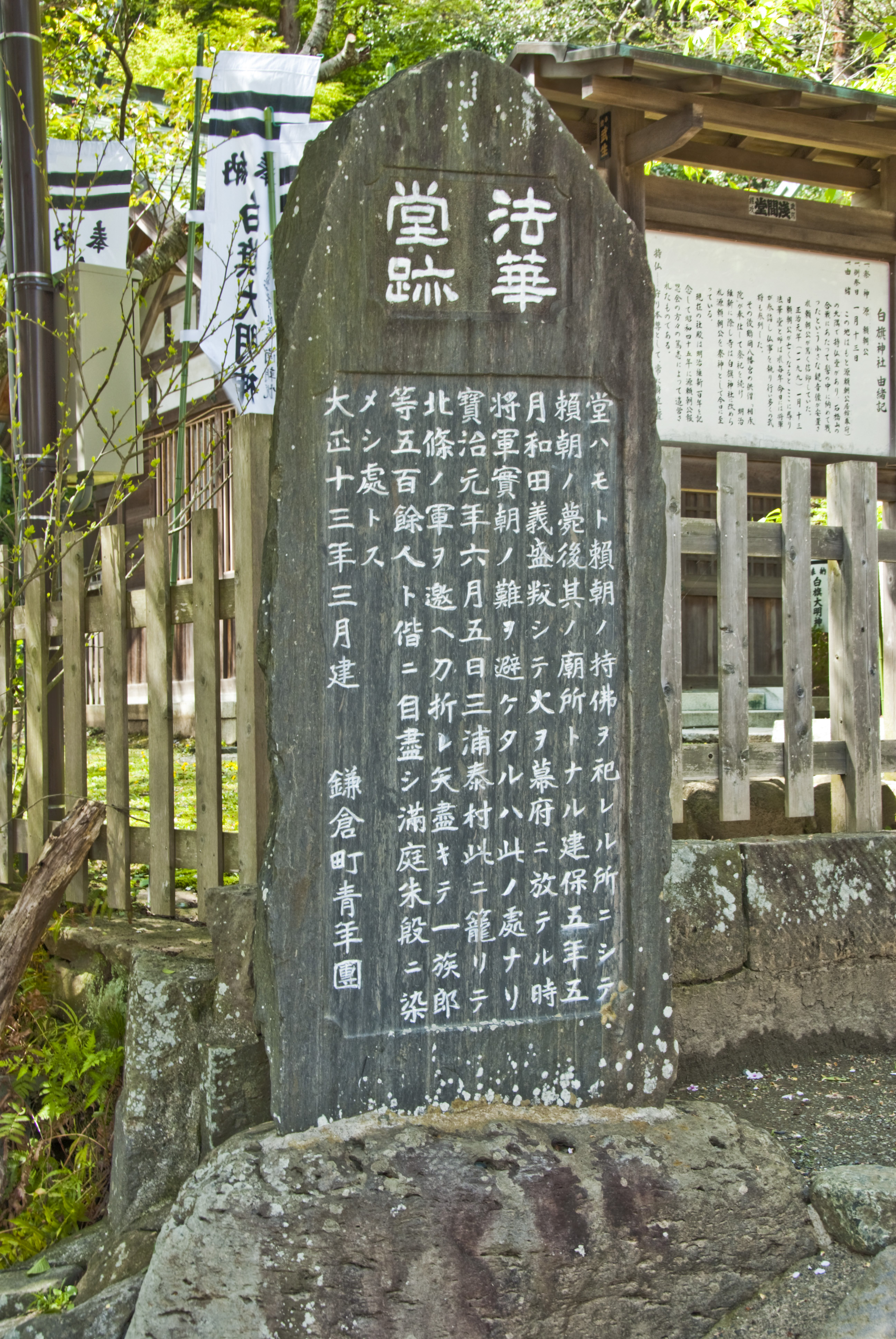
The stele on the spot where the Hokke-dō used to stand.

A Hokke-dō (法華堂, lit. "Lotus Sūtra hall") is today a Tendai hall whose layout allows walking around a statue for meditation. The purpose of walking is to concentrate on the Lotus Sūtra and seek the ultimate truth. In Yoritomo's time however the term simply meant someone's funerary hall. That use of the word had its origin in the fact that the Lotus Sūtra (Hokkekyō) was usually read during funeral ceremonies.

Built in 1189 as Yoritomo's personal temple, at his death in 1199 it became his grave and there were performed his funerary rites. The Hokke-dō however assumed its present name only the following year, in occasion of Yoritomo's yearly funeral rites for that year. Likely a building of a certain size, it had as its dōshi (officiating monk) the famous holy man Eisai and, according to the Azuma Kagami, it was visited by Hōjō Tokimasa and the powerful of the shogunate.

The main object of worship chosen by Yoritomo was a 6 cm silver statue of Shō-Kannon, which seems to attest that the temple wasn't built simply as a grave for the shōgun.

==== The Wada Kassen ====
In 1213 Wada Yoshimori rebelled against the Hōjō regents in the so-called Wada Kassen (和田合戦, Wada Rebellion) and his famous son Asahina Yoshihide stormed into the Ōkura Bakufu, burning it into the ground. Second shōgun Minamoto no Sanetomo consequently had to run for his life, and found refuge in the Hokke-dō. Shikken Hōjō Yoshitoki and chief vassal (重臣, jūshin) Ōe no Hiromoto followed him there. It seems likely that this was done not simply because the temple was close, but also because it was in an elevated position, was sufficiently large to house an army and therefore easily defensible, and was probably fortified.

==== The Hōji Kassen (a.k.a. Miura no Ran) and the death of the Miura clan ====
In 1247, 500 members of the Miura clan, at the closing of the Hōji Battle (宝治合戦, Hoji Kassen) (also known as the Miura Rebellion (三浦の乱, Miura no Ran)) barricaded inside the Hokke-dō under the orders of Miura Yasumura and committed seppuku (mass suicide). It is said that the whole floor was red with their blood.

The episode was the culmination of events that saw the tension between the Hōjō and the Adachi clans, on one side, and the Miura on the other, grow to the point where Adachi Yasumori with his troops attacked Yasumura's mansion in Nishi Mikado. The mansion was burned down and the clan took refuge inside the Hokke-dō. There, realizing their position was hopeless, the decision was taken to proceed with the seppuku. Their deaths are commemorated in a yagura carved in the rock a few hundred meters to the east of this site. (See below)

==== The Edo period and Shirahata Shrine ====
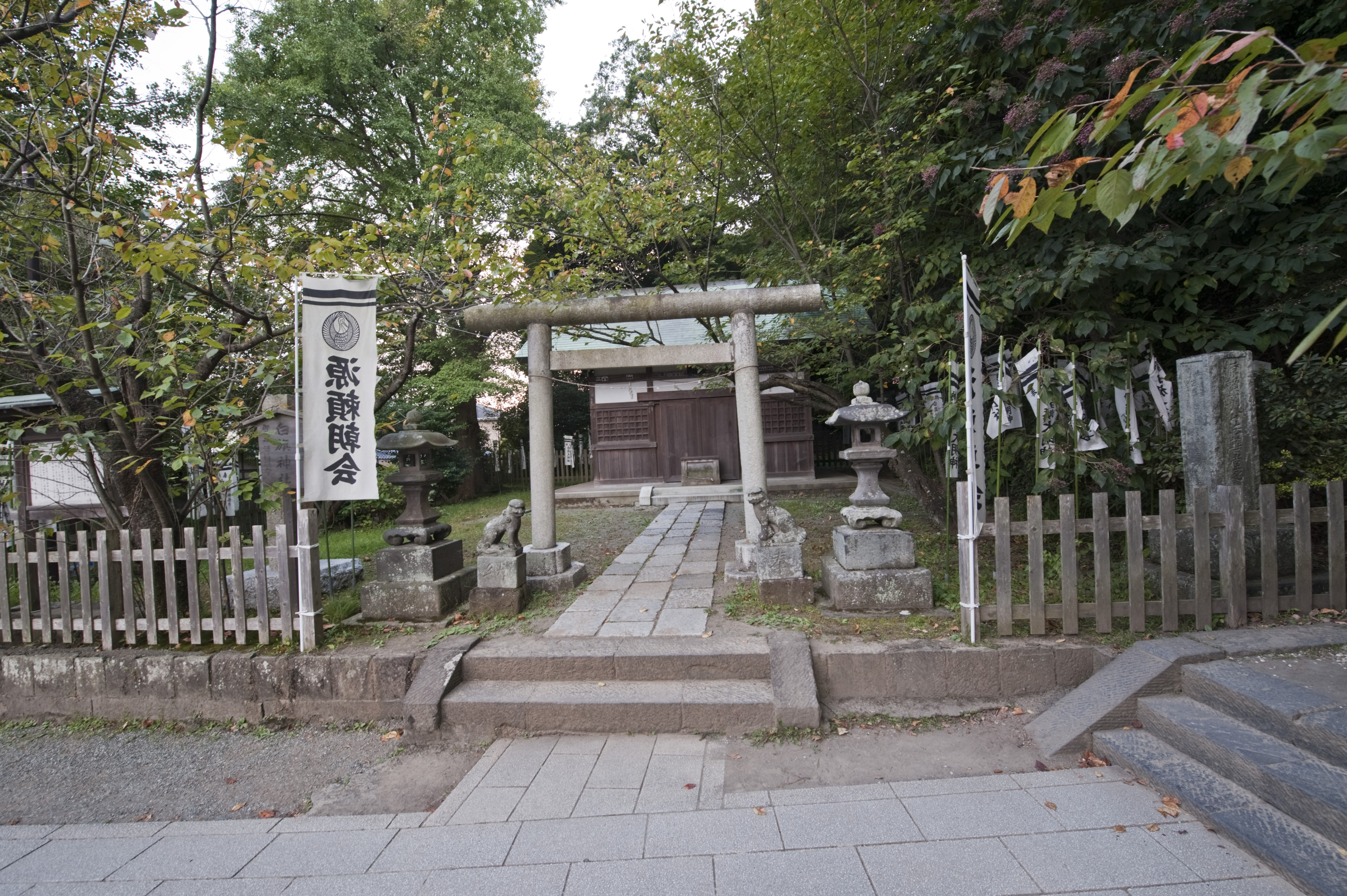
Shirahata Shrine

We know that during the Edo period (1600–1878) the Hokke-dō had already moved to the spot where Shirahata Jinja is today. The area around the tomb of Yoritomo is clearly shown in an Edo period drawing (below), and in it the Hokke-dō has already moved from its original site on the side of the hill to the plain under the original location. Clearly visible in the upper left corner are also the tombs of Ōe no Hiromoto, Shimazu Tadahisa and Mōri Suemitsu.

The Buddhist temple was also used as a Shinto shrine (as was normal at the time), and in fact it enshrined the spirit of Yoritomo. When however during the Meiji period the separation of Buddhism and Shinto was made mandatory with the Shinto and Buddhism Separation Order (神仏判然令, Shinbutsu Hanzenrei) (see the articles Shinbutsu Bunri and Haibutsu kishaku), Yoritomo's kami had by law to be enshrined with the name Shirahata Daimyōjin (白幡大明神) in today's Shirahata Shrine, a Shinto shrine under the administration of Tsurugaoka Hachiman-gū. The name Shirahata, meaning "white flag", is a reference to the white Minamoto flag. The area where the demolished Hokke-dō used to stand was then declared a national Historic Site. According to the sign in front of Shirahata Shrine, the present building was built in 1970 with charity donations.

=== The tomb of Yoritomo ===
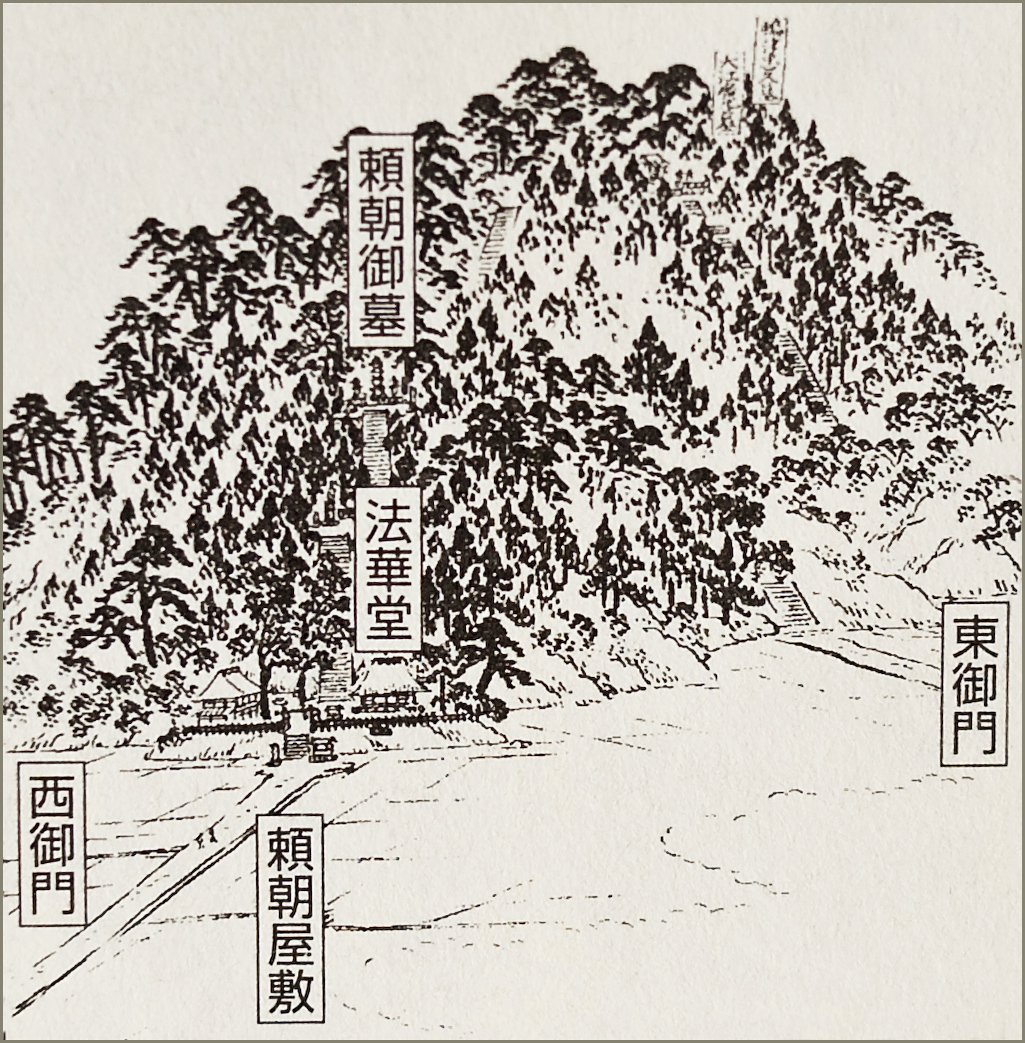
The area around the tomb of Yoritomo in an Edo period drawing

The gorintō that today constitutes the grave was brought there by Tsurugaoka Shōgon-in (鶴岡荘厳院)'s chief priest from the ruins of a temple called Shōchōju-in (勝長寿院) at the time the Meiji period's forcible separation of Shinto and Buddhism. According to a 1795 document called Tōzai Yūki (東西遊記), at the time just to the north of the Ōkura Bakufu there was Yorotomo's funerary mound (頼朝の塚, Yoritomo no tsuka). The author mentions that locals were pleased by the fact that repairs to it were planned.

The first mention of a gorintō is of 1814. Shimazu Shigehide in 1779 had his ancestor's tomb repaired, a temizubachi installed and the whole place refurbished.

Every year on April 13, as part of the Kamakura Matsuri week of celebrations, in front of the tomb is held the Festival at the Tomb of Minamoto no Yoritomo (源頼朝公墓前祭). From Kyūshū comes also a representative of the Shimazu clan, whose founder Shimazu Tadashisa is buried in the vicinity.

== The tombs of Ōe no Hiromoto, Shimazu Tadahisa and Mōri Suemitsu ==
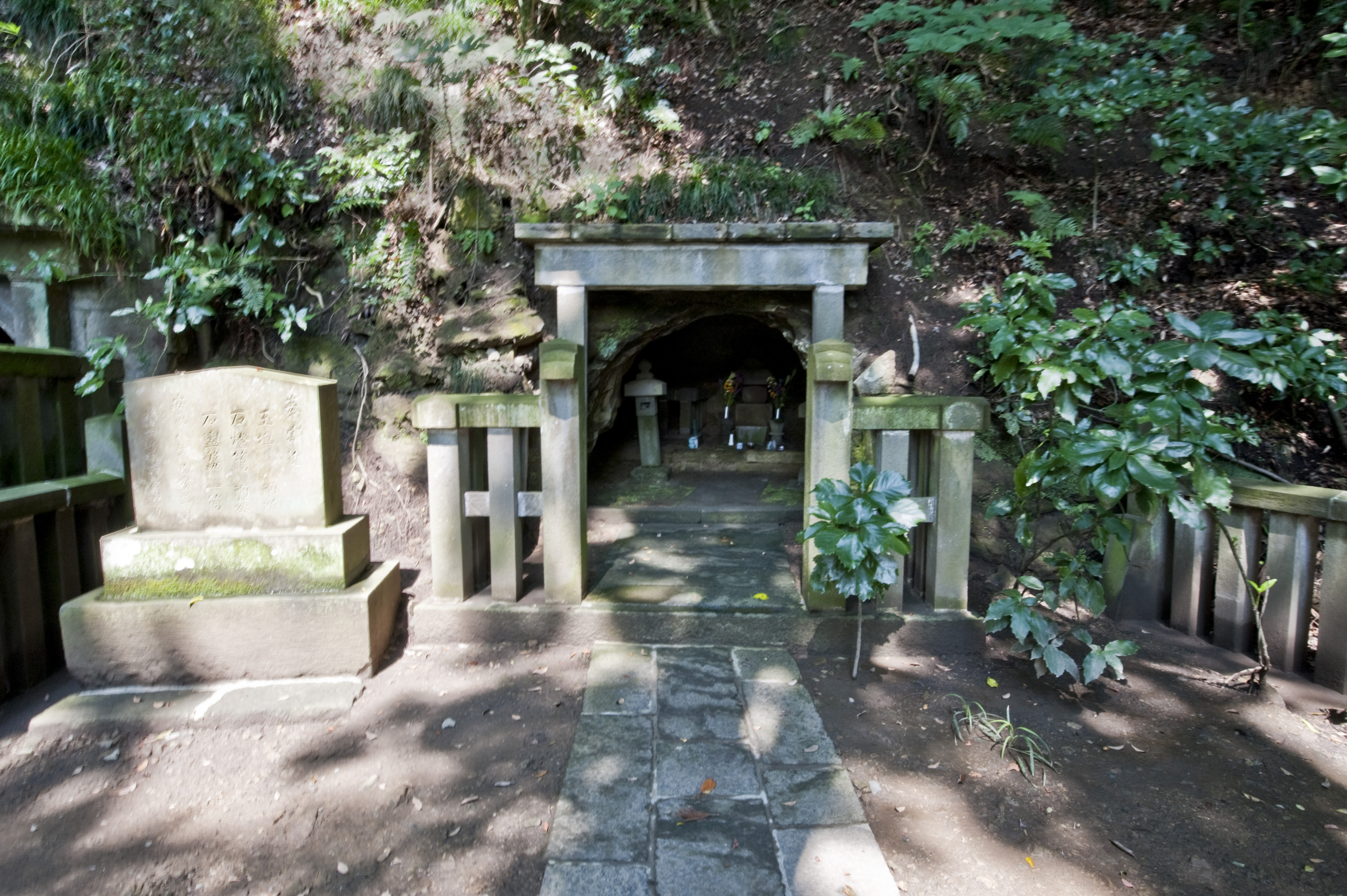
The grave of Shimazu Tadahisa. The other two, smaller graves are to its left.

A steep stairway carved into the rock a few meters away from Yoritomo's grave leads to the graves of Shimazu Tadahisa, Mōri Suemitsu and Ōe no Hiromoto.

Ōe no Hiromoto was a kuge and the Kamakura shogunate's chief vassal, and he greatly contributed to the development and consolidation of its administrative structure.

Shimazu Tadahisa (d. 1227) was the illegitimate son of shōgun Yoritomo and a sister of Hiki Yoshikazu, and the founder of the Shimazu clan. He was nominated shugo, or governor, of Satsuma province in Kyūshū. His family would then retain control of the province until the Meiji restoration in the 19th century. His tomb was built here by his descendant Shigehide in 1779.

Mōri Suemitsu (毛利季光) (1211–1247) was Ōe no Hiromoto's fourth son and the founder of the Mōri clan. He died together with the Miura at the Hokke-dō in 1247.

Their graves, carved from the side of the hill, stand side to side and are still regularly tended to.

== The yagura of the Miura clan ==
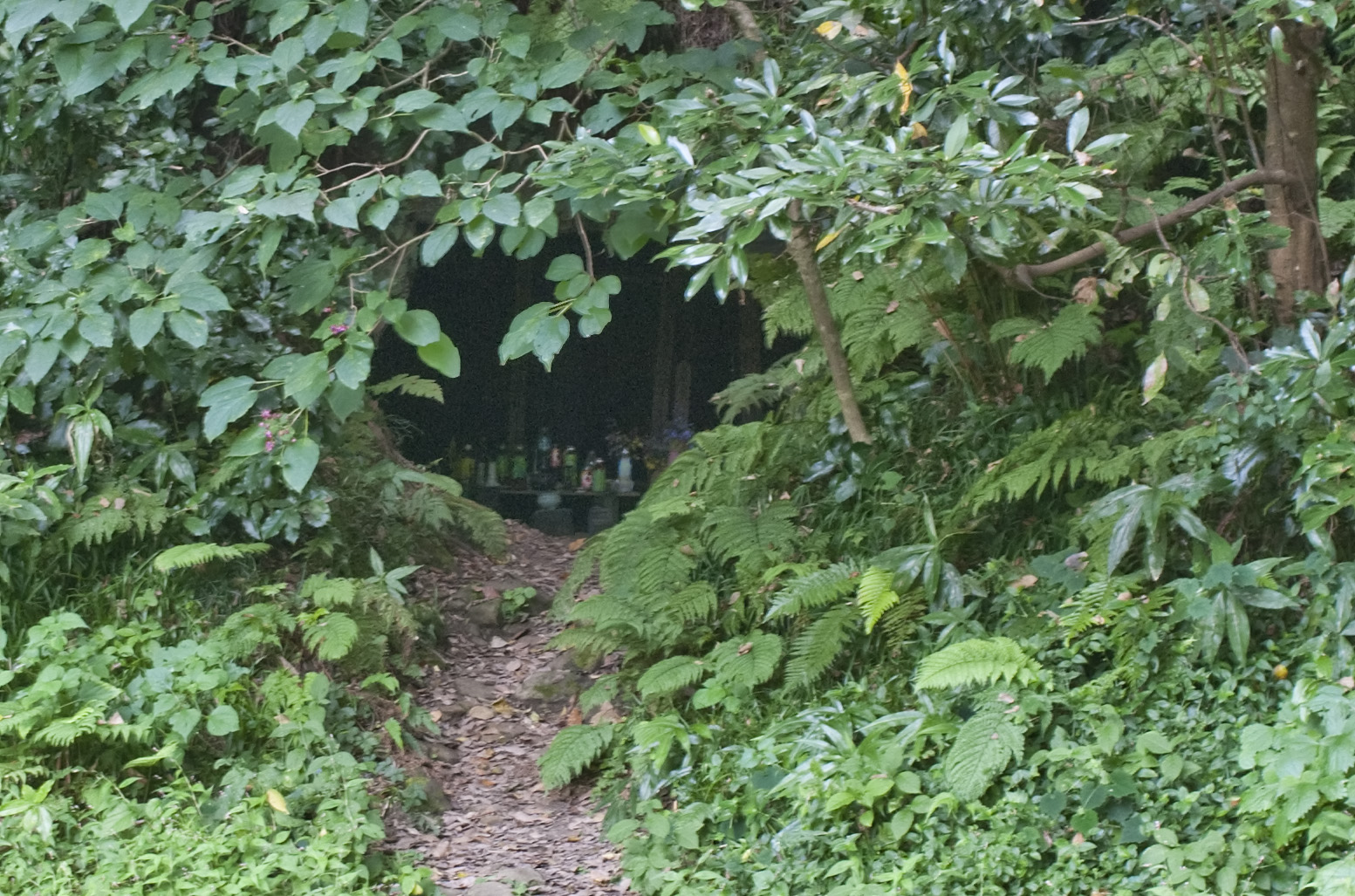
The yagura of the Miura clan. Visible food offerings and some sotoba (small wooden stupa)

During the Kamakura period in and around Kamakura, for reasons that are unclear, warriors, priests and sometimes even commoners were buried in caves called Yagura carved out of the soft limestone that makes up the hills around the city. Yagura containing a gorintō were sometimes used also as cenotaphs (memorial monuments). The souls of those of the Miura clan who perished during the siege of the neighboring Hokke-dō are enshrined in a small yagura whose opening is barely visible to the left of the base of the twin stairways leading to the tombs of Shimazu Tadahisa and Mōri Suemitsu (see map above). The cenotaph is still tended and visited.
