= Mōri Tokichika =

- 毛利 時親
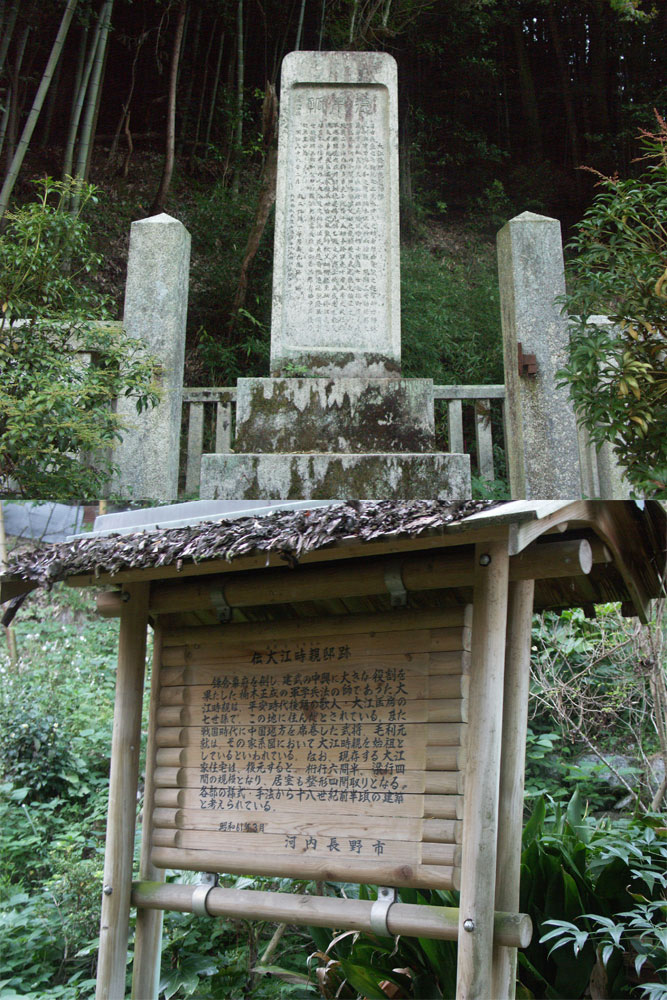
- Tomb of Tokichika in Kamakura
- Died: August 26, 1341
- Relatives: Mōri Tsunemitsu (father)
- Military career
- Allegiance: Minamoto clan
- Rank: Gokenin of the Kamakura shogunate
- Nickname: Shirō (四郎)
- Unit: Mōri clan

Mōri Tokichika (毛利 時親; died August 26, 1341) was a samurai during the Kamakura period and a gokenin of the Kamakura shogunate. He was the fourth son of Mōri Tsunemitsu, and grandson of Mōri Suemitsu, the founder of the Mōri clan. Mōri Tokichika became the head of the Mōri family in 1270.

== See also ==
- Mōri clan
- Mōri Motonari
- Miura clan
- Minamoto no Yoritomo
- Minamoto no Sanetomo
