= Mōri Tsunemitsu =

Kamakura-period samurai

- 毛利 経光
- Relatives: Mōri Suemitsu (father)
- Military career
- Allegiance: Minamoto clan
- Rank: Daimyō (Lord)
- Nickname: Chiyojumaru (千代寿丸)
- Unit: Mōri clan

Mōri Tsunemitsu (毛利 経光) was a samurai during the Kamakura period and a gokenin of the Kamakura shogunate. He was the fourth son of Mōri Suemitsu, the founder of the Mōri clan.

After his father committed seppuku from his defeat in battle, Tsunemitsu survived. He was allowed to retain the family's position of jitō of the estates of Sahashi in Echigo and Yoshida in Aki, the combined value of which, as recorded in the fourteenth century, was 3,000 kanmon per year. (Note: 1 kanmon equals 1000 mon)

== See also ==
- Mōri clan
- Mōri Motonari
- Miura clan
- Minamoto no Yoritomo
- Minamoto no Sanetomo
