= Hiromoto =

- Gender: Male

Origin
- Origin: Japanese
- Meaning: Different meanings depending on the kanji used

Hiromoto (written: 弘元, 広元 or 博元) is a masculine Japanese given name. Notable people with the name include:

- Mōri Hiromoto (毛利 弘元; 1466–1506), Japanese samurai
- Ōe no Hiromoto (大江 広元; 1148–1225), Japanese court noble
- Hiromoto Okubo (大久保 博元; born 1967), Japanese baseball player
