= Ōkura Bakufu =

Coordinates: 35°19′28.12″N 139°33′40.29″E

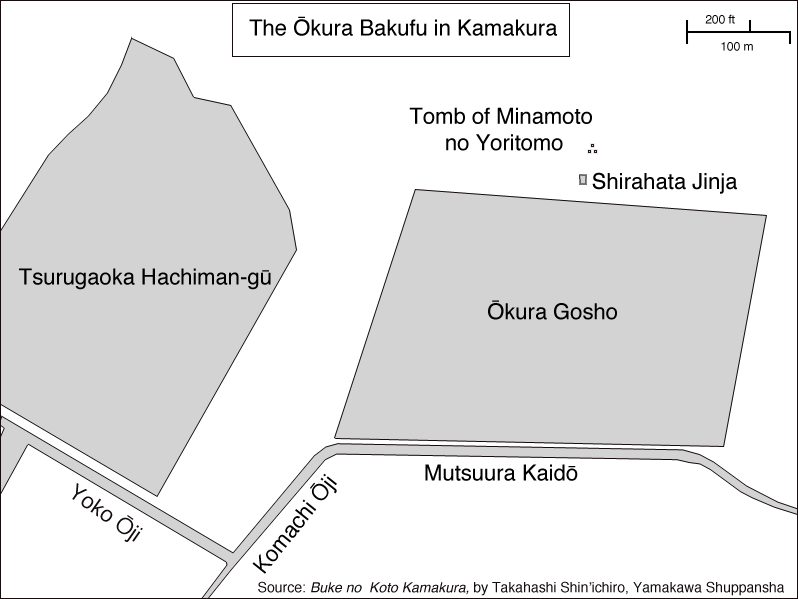
A map of the Ōkura Bakufu

Ōkura Bakufu (大蔵幕府 or 大倉幕府) (also called Ōkura Gosho (大蔵御所) is the name given in Japan to the first government of the shōgun Minamoto no Yoritomo. The name is that of the location in Kamakura, Kanagawa Prefecture, where Yoritomo's palace used to stand. Ōkura is defined as the area between the Tsurugaoka Hachiman-gū, Asaina Pass, the Namerigawa (Nameri River) and the Zen temple of Zuisen-ji. Yoritomo's palace complex extended approximately from the Mutsuura Kaidō to the site of his tomb, and from the Nishi Mikado River (or Tsurugaoka Hachiman-gū) to the Higashi Mikado River (about 800 meters by 600 meters). A black stone stele marks the center of the area where Yoritomo's government offices used to stand and carries the following words:

820 years ago, in 1180, Minamoto no Yoritomo built his mansion here. Having consolidated his power, he ruled from this mansion, and his government was therefore called the Ōkura Bakufu. He was succeeded by his sons Yoriie and Sanetomo, and this place remained the seat of the government for 46 years until 1225, when his wife Hōjō Masako died. It was then transferred to Utsunomiya Tsuji (宇津宮辻).
Erected in March 1917 by the Kamakura-machi Seinendan [Young People's Association]

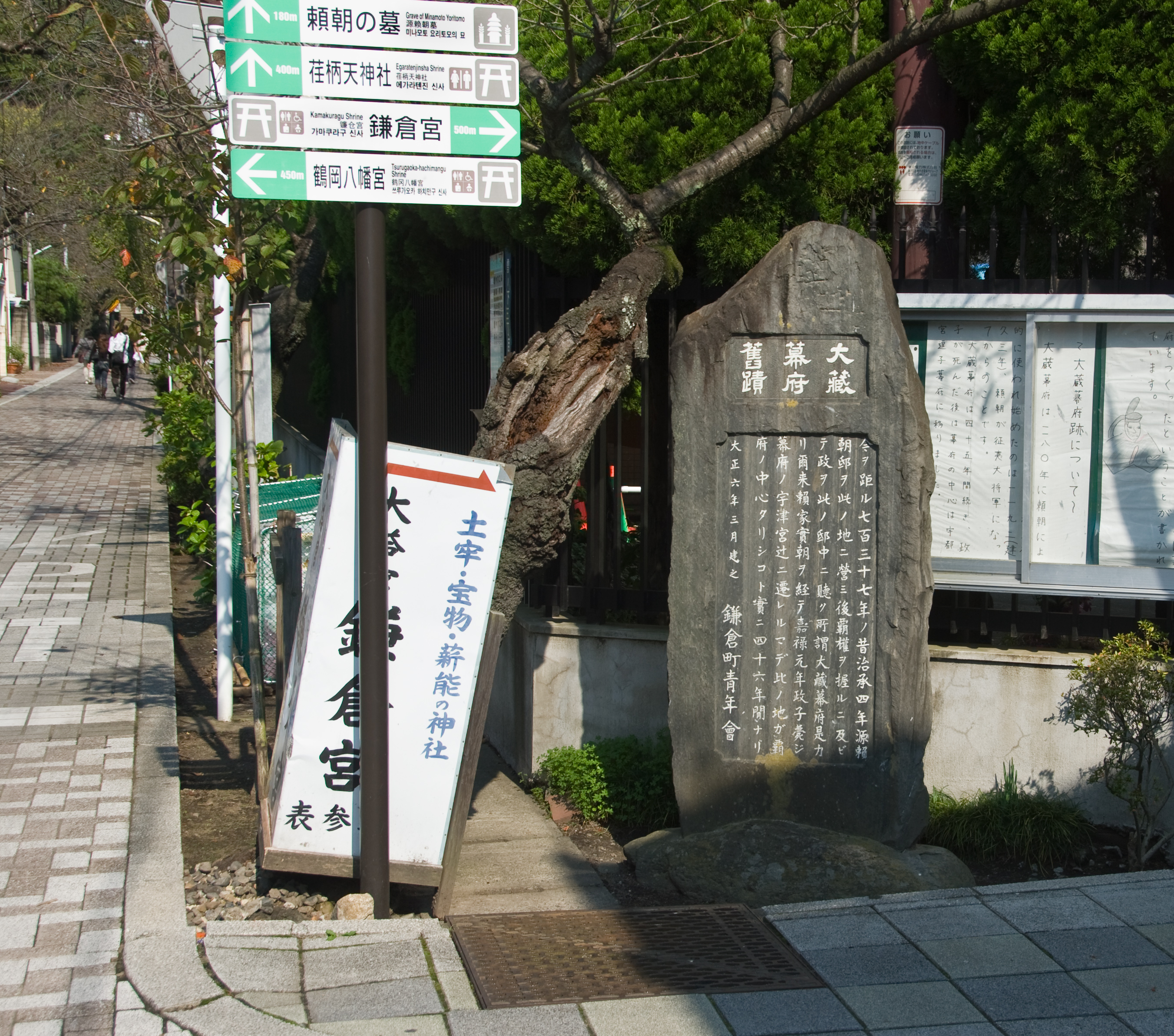
The stele marking the spot where the Ōkura Bakufu used to stand

In 1213, when Wada Yoshimori rebelled against the Hōjō regents in the so-called Wada Kassen, his son Asahina Yoshihide stormed into the Ōkura Bakufu and burned it to the ground. It was later rebuilt.

Many powerful Gokenin had their mansions in Ōkura, which was therefore one of the most important parts of medieval Kamakura. The palace gave rise to the names of at least two other Kamakura neighborhoods, Nishi Mikado and Higashi Mikado, which mean respectively "Western Gate" and "East Gate". The area now called Nikaidō (二階堂) used to be called Higashi Mikado, and the name is still sometimes used. Kita Mikado still exists as well, but does not constitute a chō.
