= Kenin =

Kenin may refer to:

== History ==
- Kenin (Japanese history) (家人, house person) third of the five lower castes of the Japanese ritsuryō system

== People ==
- Sofia Kenin (born 1998), American tennis player
- Alexa Kenin (1962–1985), American actress

== Entertainment ==
- Kenin (band)
