= Mōri Hiromoto =

Japanese warlord (1466–1506)

- 毛利 弘元

Head of Mōri clan
- In office 1476–1506
- Preceded by: Mōri Toyomoto
- Succeeded by: Mōri Okimoto

Personal details
- Born: 1466 Aki
- Died: February 13, 1506 (aged 39 or 40) Tajihi-Sarugake Castle, Aki
- Relations: Mōri Toyomoto (father); Mōri Okimoto (son); Mōri Motonari (son)
- Nickname: Chiyojumaru (千代寿丸)

Military service
- Allegiance: Ōuchi clan
- Rank: Jizamurai
- Unit: Mōri clan
- Commands: Yoshida-Kōriyama Castle

Mōri Hiromoto (毛利 弘元; 1466 – February 13, 1506) was a local warlord (jizamurai) of Aki Province in the west Chūgoku region of Japan during the Muromachi period and Sengoku period of the 16th century. The Mōri clan claimed descent from Ōe no Hiromoto, an adviser to Minamoto no Yoritomo. He is most known as the father of the famous Mōri Motonari.

== Biography ==
Not much is known about the early life of Hiromoto but in 1476 he became head of the Mōri clan when his father Mōri Toyomoto died. He was one of the many subordinate lords who were vassals of Ōuchi Masahiro. After the death of Masahiro he continued to serve his son and successor, Ōuchi Yoshioki. His son Mōri Okimoto also followed the Ōuchi clan.

In 1500, Hiromoto was involved in a power dispute with the Ashikaga shogunate and the Ōuchi clan and decided to retire. He handed over the head position of the clan to his eldest son, Mōri Okimoto and moved to Tajihi-Sarugake Castle (多治比猿掛城) with his son Shōjumaru (the later Mōri Motonari). Okimoto then took over Yoshida-Kōriyama Castle, the main stronghold of the clan.

In 1501 his wife died and he died in 1506 from alcohol poisoning.

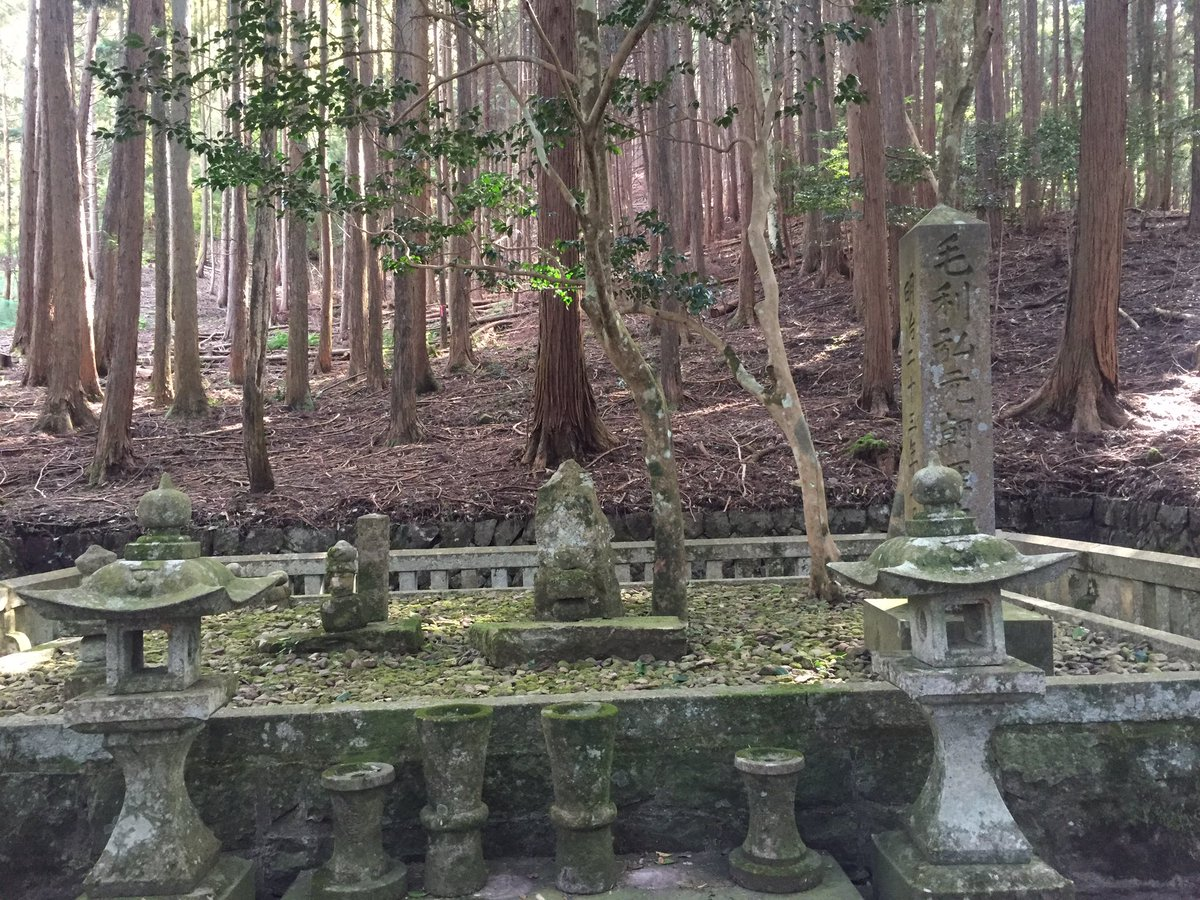
Grave of Mōri Hiromoto

His grave is at Esō Temple (Esō-in 悦叟院) in Akitakata City, Hiroshima Prefecture.

== Family ==
- Father: Mōri Toyomoto (毛利興元, 1444–1476)
- Mother: unknown
  - Brother: Kaneshige Motoshige (兼重元鎮, d. 1541)
    - Wife: name unknown, daughter of Fukubara Hirotoshi (福原広俊).
      - 1st son: Mōri Okimoto (毛利興元, 1492–1516)
      - 2nd son: Mōri Motonari (毛利元就, 1497–1571)
    - Concubine: Lady from Aiō clan (相合大方)
      - 3rd son: Aiō Mototsuna (相合元綱, d. 1524)
    - Concubine: Lady from Arita clan (有田氏女)
      - 4th son: Kita Narikatsu (北就勝, d. 1557)
    - Concubine: ?
      - 5th son: Mitsuke Motouji (見付元氏)

== See also ==
- Mōri clan
- Mōri Motonari
