= Mōri clan =

Japanese samurai clan

Mōri clan 毛利
- Mōri clan (mon)
- Home province: Sagami; Aki
- Parent house: Imperial House of Japan; Ōe clan (大江氏)
- Titles: various
- Founder: Mōri Suemitsu (毛利季光)
- Final ruler: Mōri Takachika (毛利敬親)
- Current head: Mōri Motohide (毛利元栄)
- Founding year: 13th century (first half)
- Dissolution: still extant
- Ruled until: 1868, after the Boshin War and during the (Meiji Restoration), Mōri Takachika is the first daimyō to hand over his lands to Emperor Meiji.

The Mōri clan (毛利氏, Mōri-shi; Japanese pronunciation: [moꜜː.ɾʲi, moː.ɾʲiꜜ.ɕi]) was a Japanese samurai clan descended from Ōe no Hiromoto. Ōe no Hiromoto was descended from the Fujiwara clan. The family's most illustrious member, Mōri Motonari, greatly expanded the clan's power in Aki Province. During the Edo period his descendants became daimyō of the Chōshū Domain under the Tokugawa shogunate. After the Meiji Restoration with the abolition of the han system and daimyō, the Mōri clan became part of the new nobility.

== Origins ==
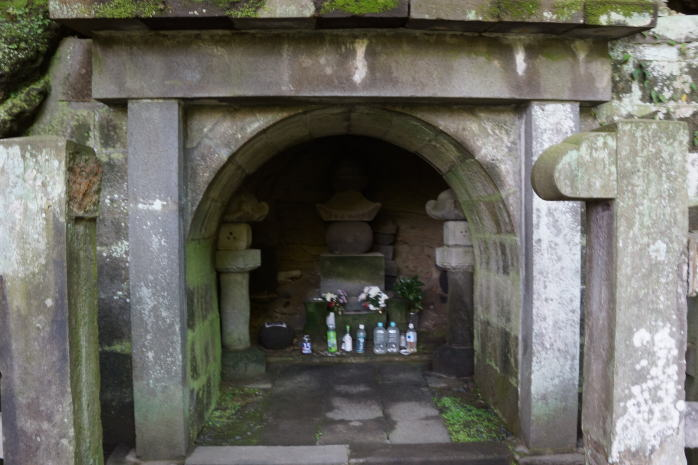
Grave of Mōri Suemitsu in Kamakura.

The founder of the clan, Mōri Suemitsu, was the fourth son of Ōe no Hiromoto. He founded the clan when he took the name from his shōen named "Mōri" in Aikō District, Sagami Province. After the Jōkyū War, Suemitsu was appointed to the jitō office of a shōen in Aki Province. He was defeated by Hōjō Tokiyori in 1247 and committed suicide (seppuku) at Minamoto no Yoritomo's shrine (hokkedō) along with his Miura clan allies. The lineage of the Mori clan is well verified because it matches up from several different sources such as the Mōri Family Tree (毛利系図), Sonpi Bunmyaku and Ōe Family Tree (大江氏系図).

According to the Sonpi Bunmyaku (尊卑分脈) from the late 14th century:

Ōe no Hiromoto (大江広元, 1148–1225)
 　┃
Mōri Suemitsu (毛利季光, 1202–1247)
 　┃
Mōri Tsunemitsu (毛利経光, ? – ? )
 　┃
Mōri Tokichika (毛利時親, ? –1341)
 　┃
Mōri Sadachika (毛利貞親, ? –1351)
 　┃
Mōri Chikahira (毛利親衡, ? –1375), moved the family to Aki Province.
 　┃
Mōri Motoharu (毛利元春, 1323– ? )

== Kamakura period ==
During the Kamakura shogunate the Mōri were a gokenin family due to the fame of their ancestor Ōe no Hiromoto. Mōri Suemitsu, the fourth son of Ōe no Hiromoto inherited Mōri-shōen from his father and that is why he began to use the name. It is reasonable to say he is the first head of the Mōri clan but in the Mōri family tradition he is the 39th head of the family as he is the 39th linear descendant of Amenohohi-no-mikoto (天穂日命), an ancient god of Japan. After the third head of the clan, Mōri Tokichika, his son Mōri Sadachika (毛利貞親) was supposed to succeed him but he and his son were both killed by the Hōjō clan and the great-grandson of Tsunemitsu became the next head of the clan.

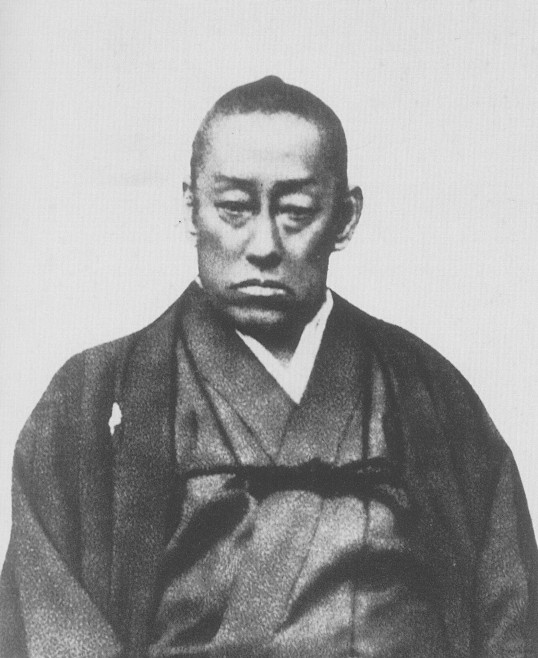
Mōri Takachika

At the end of the Kamakura shogunate, they became distant from the shogunate and showed a favorable attitude to Ashikaga Takauji.

== Sengoku period ==
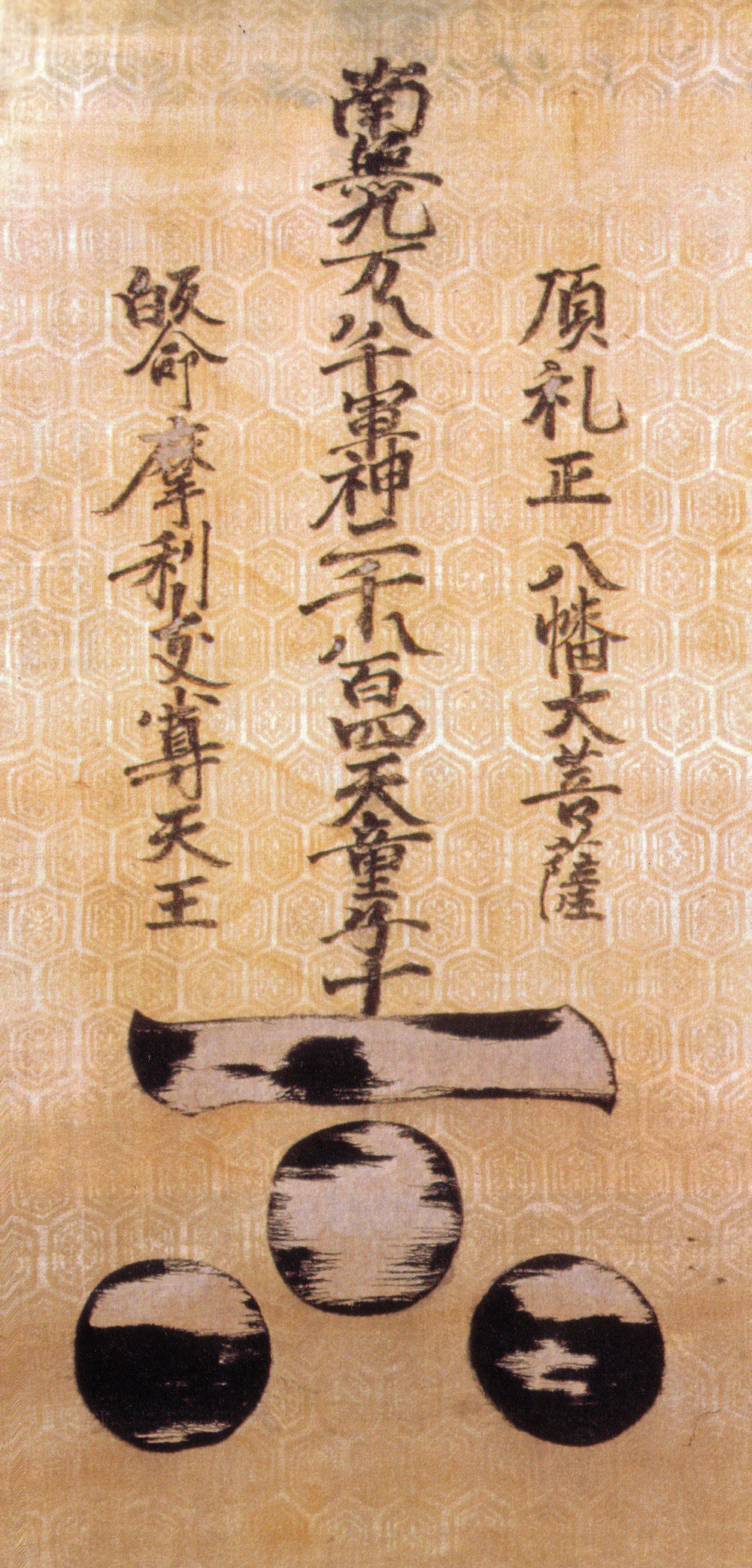
Mōri Motonari's battle standard, housed at the Mōri Museum.

In the Sengoku period, Mōri Motonari expanded their power to the whole of Aki province and then to other neighboring provinces. In his generation, Mōri became the daimyō from a local jizamurai.

During the war with the Oda clan and the Ikkō-ikki, the Mōri helped the Ikkō-ikki clans by establishing a naval trade route between each other's provincial docks and harbours, the Oda eventually nullified this by laying siege to the trade ships between the two clans and went to further disrupt trade by attempting to destroy the Mōri fleet, failing on their first attempt in 1571. The second battle took place in 1579 with the Oda sending eight Atakebune (heavily armoured ships with iron-clad plating) warships to finally destroy the Mōri naval threat.

After a struggle between Toyotomi Hideyoshi, who led his army as a general of Oda Nobunaga, the two sides made peace and Mōri remained as a daimyō who kept six provinces in Chūgoku.

== Edo period ==
In 1600, Mōri Terumoto nominally led the Western Army in the Battle of Sekigahara. The Western Army lost the battle and the Mōri clan lost four eastern provinces and moved their capital from Hiroshima to present-day Hagi, Yamaguchi. The newer fief, Mōri han, consisted of two provinces: Nagato Province and Suō Province. Derived from the former, Mōri han was referred to often as Chōshū han.

== After the Meiji Restoration ==
After the Meiji Restoration with the abolition of the han system and daimyō, the Mōri clan became part of the new nobility. They became a ducal family.

== Clan heads ==
Mōri clan crest (mon).

1. Mōri Suemitsu (毛利季光, 1202–1247), fourth son of Ōe no Hiromoto (大江広元), gokenin of the Kamakura shogunate.
2. Mōri Tsunemitsu (毛利経光, ? – ? ), gokenin of the Kamakura shogunate.
3. Mōri Tokichika (毛利時親, ? –1341), gokenin of the Kamakura shogunate.
4. Mōri Motoharu (毛利元春, 1323– ? ), great-grandson of Tokichika (father and grandfather) skipped over, jizamurai of Aki, retainer of Ashikaga shogunate.
5. Mōri Hirofusa (毛利広房, 1347–1385), jizamurai of Aki, retainer of Ashikaga shogunate.
6. Mōri Mitsufusa (毛利光房, 1386–1436), jizamurai of Aki, retainer of Ashikaga shogunate.
7. Mōri Hiromoto (毛利煕元, ? –1464), jizamurai of Aki, retainer of Ashikaga shogunate.
8. Mōri Toyomoto (毛利豊元, 1444–1476), jizamurai of Aki, retainer of Ashikaga shogunate.
9. Mōri Hiromoto (毛利弘元, 1466–1506), jizamurai of Aki, retainer of Ashikaga shogunate. Died young of alcohol poisoning.
10. Mōri Okimoto (毛利興元, 1492–1516), jizamurai of Aki, retainer of Ashikaga shogunate. Died young of alcohol poisoning, succeeded by his infant son.
11. Mōri Kōmatsumaru (毛利幸松丸, 1515–1523), jizamurai of Aki, retainer of Ashikaga shogunate. Died at only 9 years of age, succeeded by his uncle.
12. Mōri Motonari (毛利元就, 1497–1571), arguably the most famous member of the clan. Expanded the clan's power to nearly all of the Chūgoku region.
13. Mōri Takamoto (毛利隆元, 1523–1563), became head of the clan when his father "retired" but died young before his father, suspected assassination by poisoning.
14. Mōri Terumoto (毛利輝元, 1553–1625), 1st daimyō of Hiroshima Domain, taken away from him after Battle of Sekigahara.
15. Mōri Hidenari (毛利秀就, 1595–1651), 1st daimyō of Chōshū Domain.
16. Mōri Tsunahiro (毛利綱広, 1639–1689), 2nd daimyō of Chōshū Domain.
17. Mōri Yoshinari (毛利吉就, 1668–1694), 3rd daimyō of Chōshū Domain.
18. Mōri Yoshihiro (毛利吉広, 1673–1707), 4th daimyō of Chōshū Domain, adopted from the Chōfu-Mōri branch family (長府毛利家).
19. Mōri Yoshimoto (毛利吉元, 1677–1731), 5th daimyō of Chōshū Domain.
20. Mōri Munehiro (毛利宗広, 1717–1751), 6th daimyō of Chōshū Domain.
21. Mōri Shigenari (毛利重就, 1725–1789), 7th daimyō of Chōshū Domain.
22. Mōri Haruchika (毛利治親, 1754–1791), 8th daimyō of Chōshū Domain.
23. Mōri Narifusa (毛利斉房, 1782–1809), 9th daimyō of Chōshū Domain.
24. Mōri Narihiro (毛利斉熙, 1784–1836), 10th daimyō of Chōshū Domain.
25. Mōri Narimoto (毛利斉元, 1794–1836), 11th daimyō of Chōshū Domain.
26. Mōri Naritō (毛利斉広, 1814–1837), 12th daimyō of Chōshū Domain.
27. Mōri Takachika (毛利敬親, 1819–1871), 13th (and last) daimyō of Chōshū Domain.
28. Mōri Motonori (毛利元徳, 1839–1896), Duke under the Kazoku system.
29. Mōri Motoakira (毛利元昭, 1865–1938), Duke under the Kazoku system.
30. Mōri Motomichi (毛利元道, 1903–1976), Duke under the Kazoku system.
31. Mōri Motoaki (毛利元敬, 1930–2020), Duke under the Kazoku system.
32. Mōri Motohide (毛利元栄, 1967– ), head of the family.

== In popular culture ==
The clan's war with Hideyoshi appears in Eiji Yoshikawa's novel Taiko: An Epic Novel of War and Glory in Feudal Japan.

The Mōri are a playable faction in Shogun: Total War and Total War: Shogun 2.

== See also ==
- Ōe no Hiromoto
- Sagami Province
- Aki Province
- Hiroshima Domain
- Hiroshima Castle
- Chōshū Domain
- Ōuchi clan
- Amago clan
- Kobayakawa clan
- Kikkawa clan
- Hayashi Narinaga
