= Nikōbō =

Nikobo was an exorcist located in Nikaido according to ancient Japanese legend. He was described to be gentle and kind-hearted, with the ability to send away evil spirits and cure the sick or the possessed.

When the local governor's wife was sick, Nikobo was sent to heal her. He spent days by her bedside to help the wife recover by practising his exorcism. However, when the wife recovered, the governor avoided paying him by accusing Nikobo of a crime and sentenced him to death. In some versions, the governor was jealous of Nikobo and wished to revenge. This made Nikobo furious and he returned as a globe of fire, within which a human face can be seen, and he nested in a tree outside the governor's home. Eventually, the governor fell sick with a fever that killed him, and the globe of fire disappeared. In some versions, the governor's death was ruled a mystery. Legend says that every year, Nikobo's soul returns to visit the scene of its suffering.
