= Ōtabumi =

Ōtabumi (大田文) was land registers maintained by the Kamakura (1185-1333) and Muromachi shogunates (1333-1568) in medieval Japan.

Each province was required to supply a record of both private estates (荘園, shōen) and public lands (国衙領, kokugaryō). There were two sets of ōtabumi. One was initiated and kept by the shogunate, and included not only measures of landholdings and cultivated land, but also a history of land ownership. The second set was collected and kept by the provincial headquarters (国衙, kokuga) and contained only the land areas. These records were used, in part, to determine tax assessed to landholders.

Though most ōtabumi are no longer extant, those that still exist show demographic changes and shifting patterns of land ownership at the time. From the beginning of the Kamakura period to the Sengoku period (1467-1603), the warrior class gradually took over lands previously owned by court nobles (公家, kuge), temples, shrines.
