= Kita Narikatsu =

- 北就勝
- Born: unknown Aki Province
- Died: 30 August 1557
- Relatives: Father: Mōri Hiromoto; Mother: unknown
- Military career
- Allegiance: Mōri clan
- Rank: Daimyō (Lord)
- Nickname: Mōri Mototsuna (毛利元綱)
- Unit: Mōri clan

Kita Narikatsu (北就勝; ? – 30 August 1557) was a brother of the famous Mōri Motonari and son of Mōri Hiromoto.

== See also ==
- Mōri clan
- Mōri Motonari
