= Nishi Mikado =

Neighborhood in Kamakura, Japan

Coordinates: 35°19′42.82″N 139°33′35.38″E

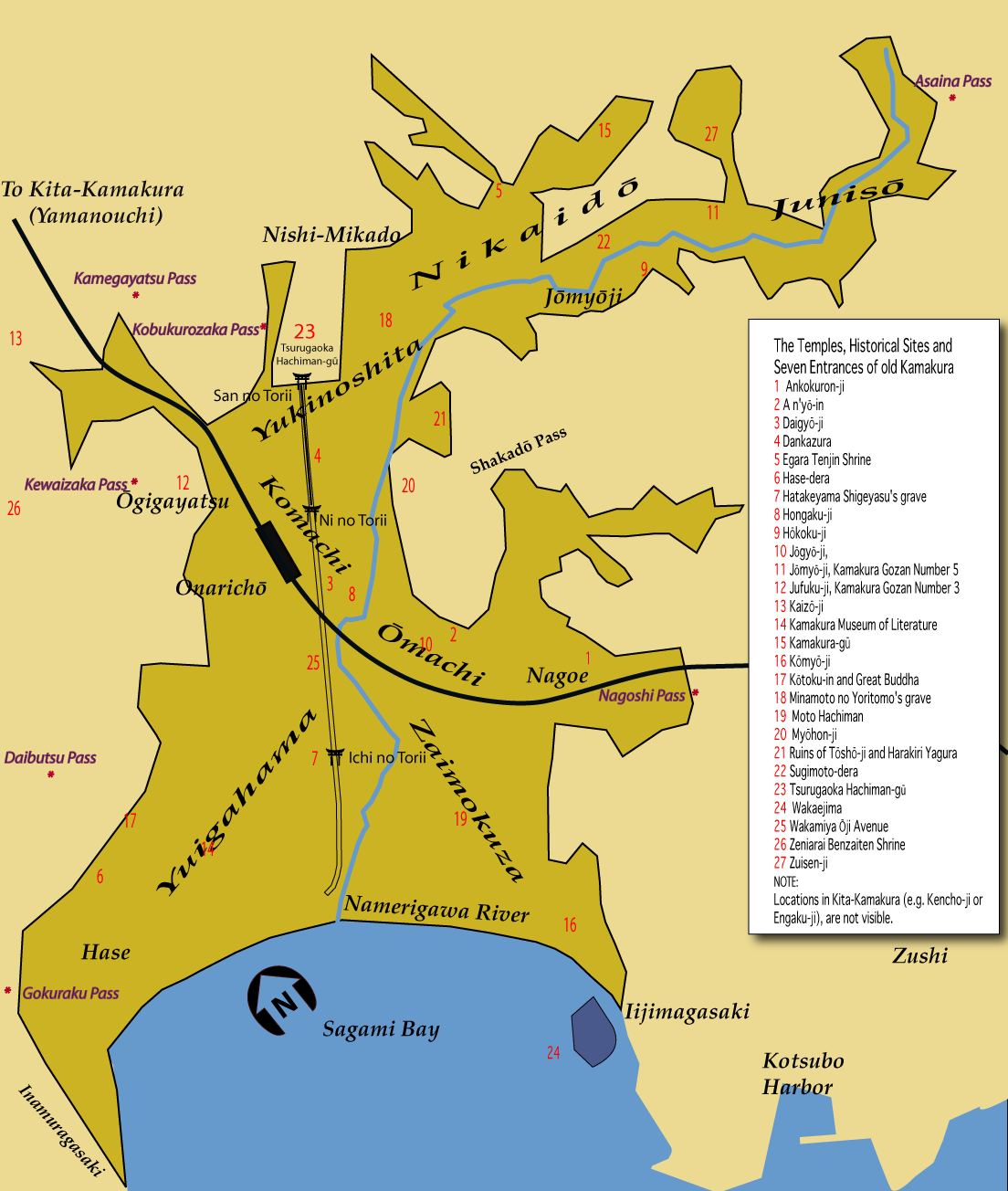
A map of Kamakura

Nishi Mikado (西御門, Western Gate) is the name of a neighborhood (a chō (町)) in Kamakura, a city located in Kanagawa, Japan, about 50 km south-south-west of Tokyo. Nishi Mikado lies north-east of Tsurugaoka Hachiman-gū.

== Etymology of the name ==
In 1180 the locality of Ōkura (大倉) in today's Nishi Mikado was chosen by Minamoto no Yoritomo as the seat of his government, which he called Ōkura Bakufu (大倉 or 大蔵幕府). (46 years later, after Hōjō Masako's death, the government's headquarters were transferred to a location near Wakamiya Ōji and renamed Utsunomiya Zushi Bakufu (宇都宮辻子幕府)). The compound had four gates, and the western one gave its name to the area it faced. The area east of Egara Tenjinsha, now called Nikaidō (二階堂), used to be called Higashi Mikado, and the name is still sometimes used. Kita Mikado still exists as well but, like Higashi Mikado, it does not constitute a chō.

The Kamakurachō Seinendan stele in Nishi Mikado says:

Nishi Mikado is the area west of the Hokkedō. It was given this name because it faced the Ōkura Bakufu's western gate. In Nishi Mikado used to stand [temples called] Hōon-ji, Hojuin, Kōshō-ji, and Raikō-ji. Of them, only Raikō-ji still exists.

== Points of interest ==
- Tomb of Minamoto no Yoritomo
- Raikō-ji
- The site of the Ōkura Bakufu
- The site of Hokkedō
- Egara Tenjinsha shrine
