= Nikaidō =

Coordinates: 35°19′20.34″N 139°33′57.99″E

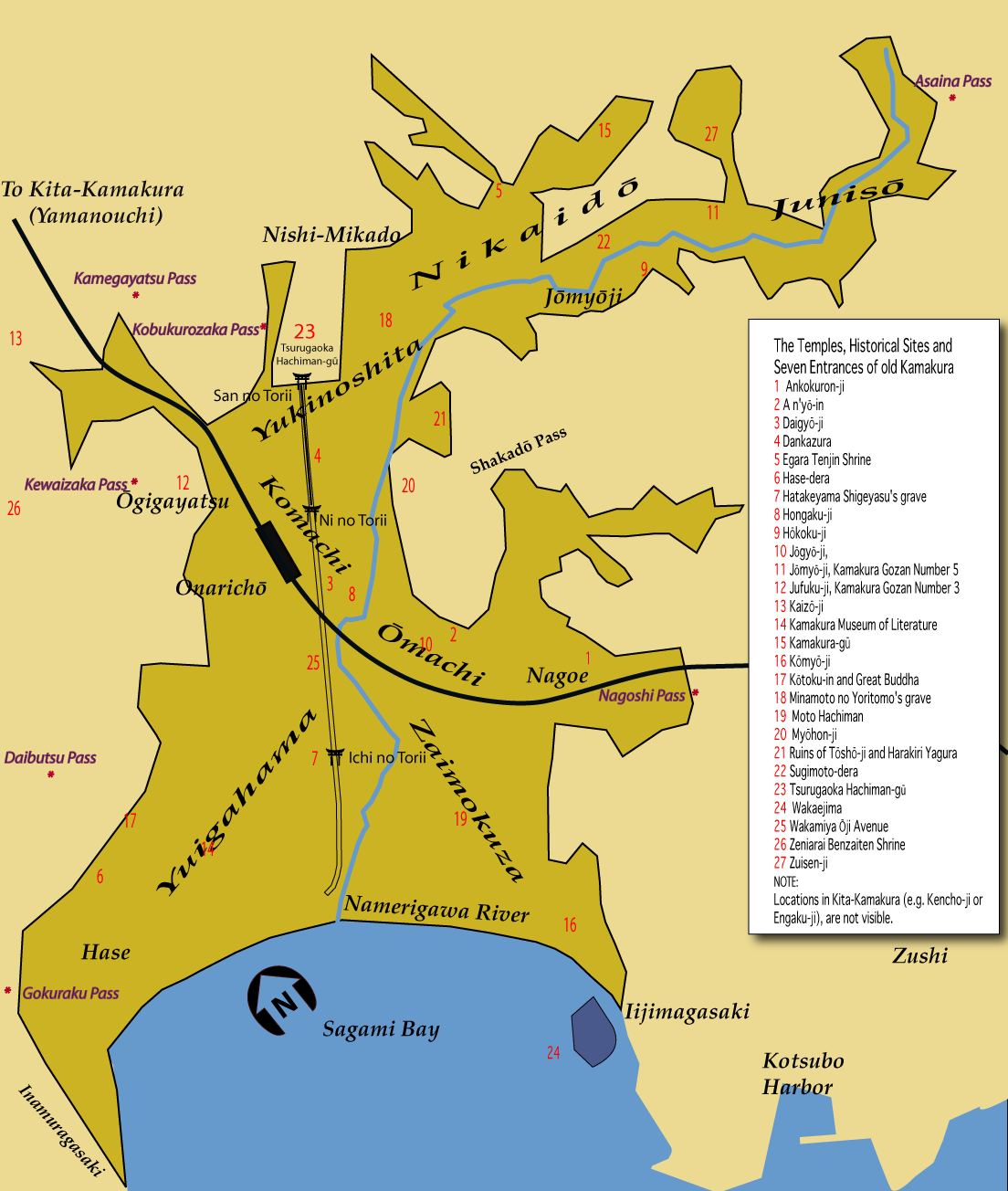
A map of Kamakura giving Nikaidō's position

Nikaidō (二階堂) is the name of one of the administrative units ("towns", chō or machi) of Kamakura, a city located in Kanagawa, Japan, about 50 km south-south-west of Tokyo. Nikaidō lies immediately to the east of Nishi Mikado and Yukinoshita, and used to be called Higashi Mikado. The name is still sometimes used. In it lie famous temples and shrines like Zuisen-ji, Egara Tenjinsha, Kamakura-gū and Kakuon-ji. It's in Nikaidō that first Kamakura shōgun Minamoto no Yoritomo built Yōfuku-ji (永福寺), one of his most important temples. It was probably part, together with Yukinoshita, of the Ōkura Valley that gave its name to the Ōkura Bakufu, Yoritomo's first government.

== Etymology of the name ==
After his wars with the Taira clan and Ōshū's Fujiwara clan, in 1189 shōgun Yoritomo founded a temple called Yōfuku-ji to comfort the souls of the samurai that had died in them. The temple was erected in a location next to today's Kamakura-gū. Its main hall was a two-story building called Nikaidō, which was copied from Chuson-ji's Daichō-in Nikaidō (大寿院二階堂) in Hiraizumi, a building the shōgun had greatly admired. In time, that famous building gave its name to the entire area where it stood. According to another theory, however, the name comes from that of an important clan vassal of the Minamoto, also called Nikaidō, because that's where the clan's mansion used to stand.

Yōfuku-ji was expanded several times, finally becoming a great temple with many pavilions and a great artificial lake. It was often visited by Yoritomo, his wife Hōjō Masako, and their descendants, who liked spending time there. The temple no longer exists, but exactly when and how it was destroyed isn't known. We do know that at the end of the Muromachi period it stopped appearing in written records and that it burned down many times, the last we know of in 1405. The area where it used to stand is now public property, and the city of Kamakura plans to turn it into an historical park.
