= Mōri Okimoto =

- 毛利 興元
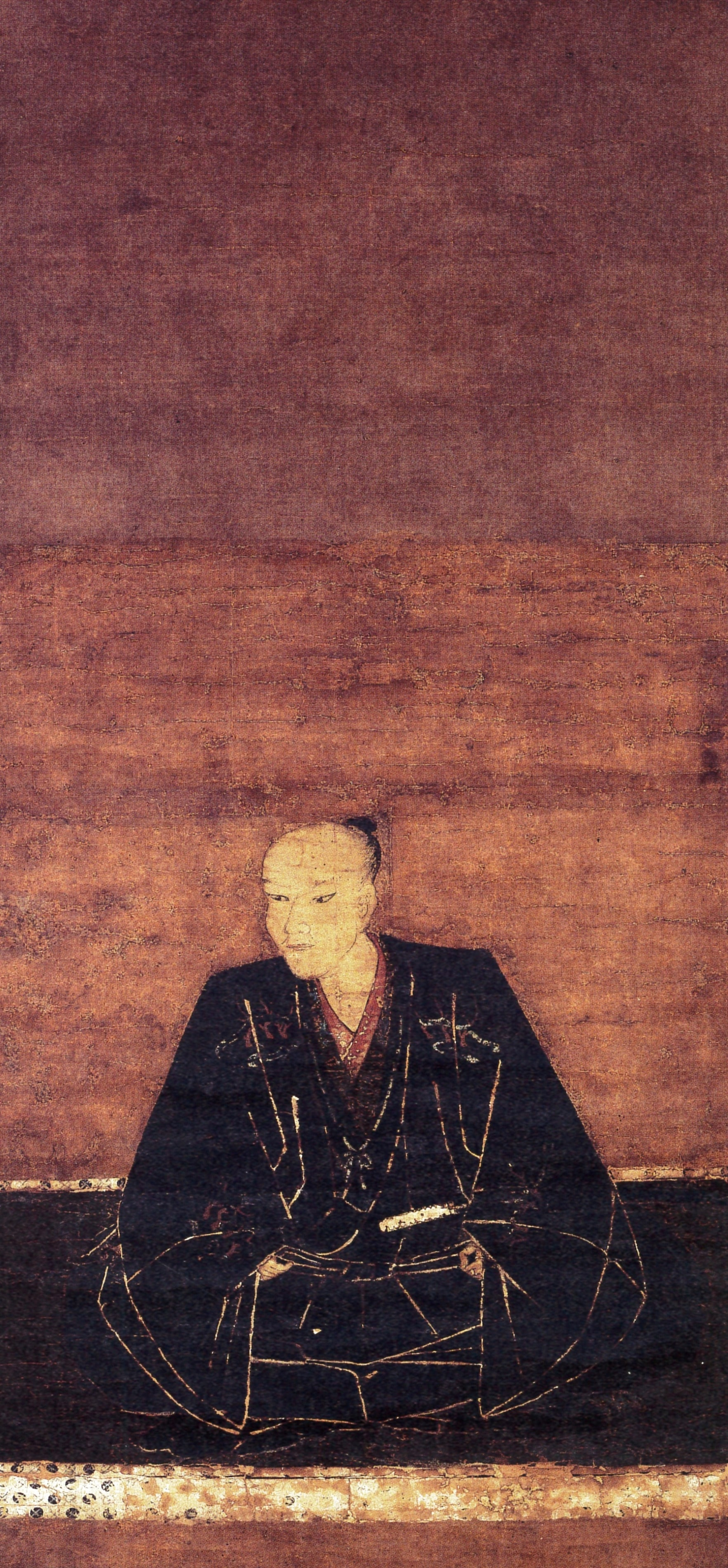

Head of Mōri clan
- In office 1506–1515
- Preceded by: Mōri Hiromoto
- Succeeded by: Mōri Kōmatsumaru

Personal details
- Born: 1492 Aki
- Died: September 21, 1515 (aged 24 or 25) Yoshida-Kōriyama Castle, Aki
- Relations: Father: Mōri Hiromoto; Mother: Fukubara Hirotoshi's daughter (福原広俊); Wife: Takahashi Hidemitsu's daughter (高橋久光)

Military service
- Allegiance: Imperial House of Japan; Ōuchi clan Mōri clan
- Rank: jizamurai
- Unit: Mōri clan

Mōri Okimoto (毛利 興元; 1492 – September 21, 1515) was a Japanese samurai of the Sengoku period, who ruled the Mōri clan. He was known for a distinctive green cape he wore over his armor, a gift from a Chinese envoy who had been shipwrecked in Tosa Province in 1509. He was older brother of Mōri Motonari.

== Family ==
- Father: Mōri Hiromoto (d. 1506)
- Brother: Mōri Motonari (1497–1571)
