= Mōri Kōmatsumaru =

Daimyo of Aki Province, Japan (1515–1523)

- 毛利 幸松丸

Head of Mōri clan
- In office 1515–1523
- Preceded by: Mōri Okimoto
- Succeeded by: Mōri Motonari

Personal details
- Born: 1515 Aki Province
- Died: August 25, 1523 (aged 7 or 8) Yoshida-Kōriyama Castle, Aki Province
- Relations: Father: Mōri Okimoto; Mother: Takahashi Hidemitsu's daughter (高橋久光); Uncle: Mori Motonari

Military service
- Allegiance: Mōri clan

Mōri Kōmatsumaru (毛利 幸松丸; 1515 – August 25, 1523) was a daimyō (feudal lord) of Aki Province during Japan's Sengoku period. He was the eldest legitimate son of Mōri Okimoto.

His father died young so he inherited as head of the Mōri clan when he was only an infant. He died when he was only seven or eight years old and was succeeded by his uncle, the famous Mōri Motonari.

== See also ==
- Mōri Motonari
- Mōri Okimoto
- Mōri clan
