= Ōe no Hiromoto =

Kuge and vassal of the Kamakura shogunate

- 大江 広元
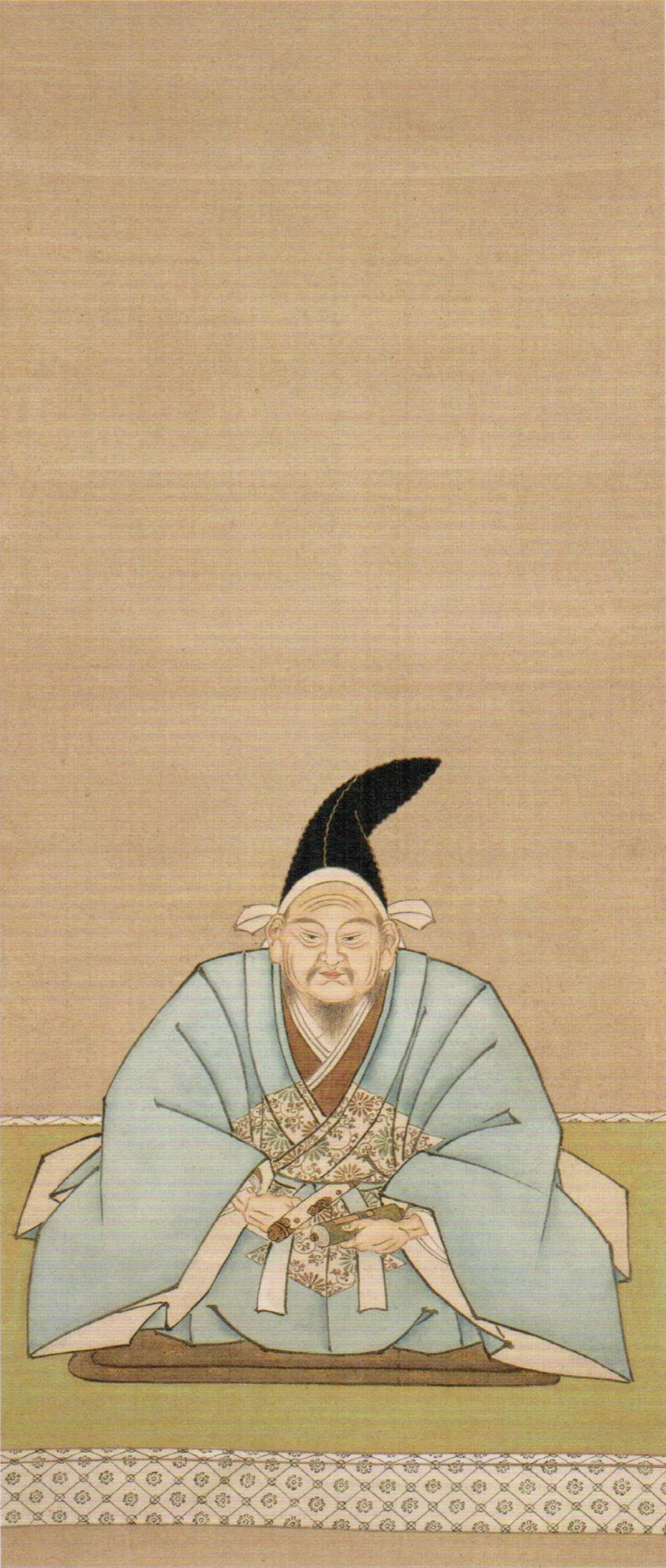
- Born: 1148
- Died: 16 July 1225 (aged 76–77)
- Military career
- Allegiance: Imperial House of Japan; Minamoto clan
- Rank: Daimyō (Lord)
- Nickname: Kōtsurumaru (幸鶴丸)
- Unit: Ōe clan

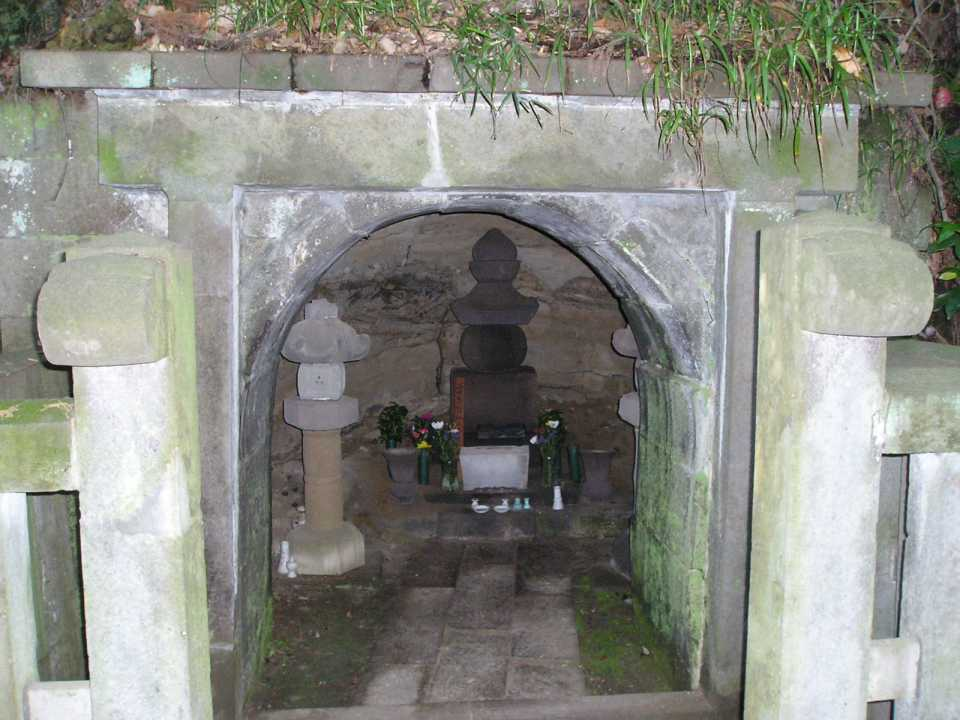
The tomb of Ōe no Hiromoto in Kamakura

Ōe no Hiromoto (大江 広元; 1148–1225) was a Japanese kuge (court noble) and vassal of the Kamakura shogunate, and contributed to establishing the shogunate's governmental structure.

== Life ==
A great-grandson of the famous scholar Ōe no Masafusa, he was born to Ōe no Koremitsu and adopted by Nakahara no Hirosue but later returned to the Ōe family in 1216. There is another theory that Hiromoto was born to Fujiwara no Mitsuyoshi. As a minor noble, he originally served at the Imperial Court in Kyoto.

In 1184 he was invited to Kamakura by Minamoto no Yoritomo, who later founded the Kamakura shogunate. He became the first head (bettō) of the new Kumonjo (Board of Public Documents) in the same year and then of the Mandokoro (Administrative Board) in 1191. On Hiromoto's advice, Yoritomo appointed jitō and shugo in 1185, which helped to strengthen shogunal control over the provinces. In 1190 Ōe followed Yoritomo to Kyoto and remained there to negotiate with the imperial court until 1192.

After Yoritomo's death, Ōe won the trust of his widow, Hōjō Masako, and assisted in the Hōjō clan's seizure of power. He was involved in several important events in the shogunate. In 1199 real power was moved from second shōgun Minamoto no Yoriie to the council of influential gokenin. In 1203 the shōgun was arrested along with his supporter Hiki Yoshikazu. Hiromoto also helped the Hōjō clan crush enemies as Hatakeyama Shigetada, Hiraga Asamasa and Wada Yoshimori.

In the Jōkyū War he insisted on making a sudden attack to Kyoto and contributed to the shogunate's overwhelming victory. He died after backing up Hōjō Yasutoki's succession. His fourth son founded the Mōri clan.

== Family ==
- Father: Ōe no Koremitsu (大江維光, 1110–1175)
- Mother: unknown
  - Main wife: daughter of Tada no Ritsuna (多田仁綱の娘)
    - 1st son: Ōe no Chikahiro (大江親広, ?–1242)
  - Unknown mother:
    - 2nd son: Nagai Tokihiro (長井時広, ?–1241)
    - 3rd son: Ōe no Munemoto (大江宗元, ?–?)
    - 4th son: Mōri Suemitsu (毛利季光, 1202–1247)
    - 5th son: Ōe no Tadashige (大江忠成, ?–1265)
    - 6th son: Ōe no Taketoshi (大江尊俊, ?–?)
    - Daughter: wife of Asukai Masatsune (飛鳥井雅経室)
