= Asahina Yoshihide =

Japanese samurai

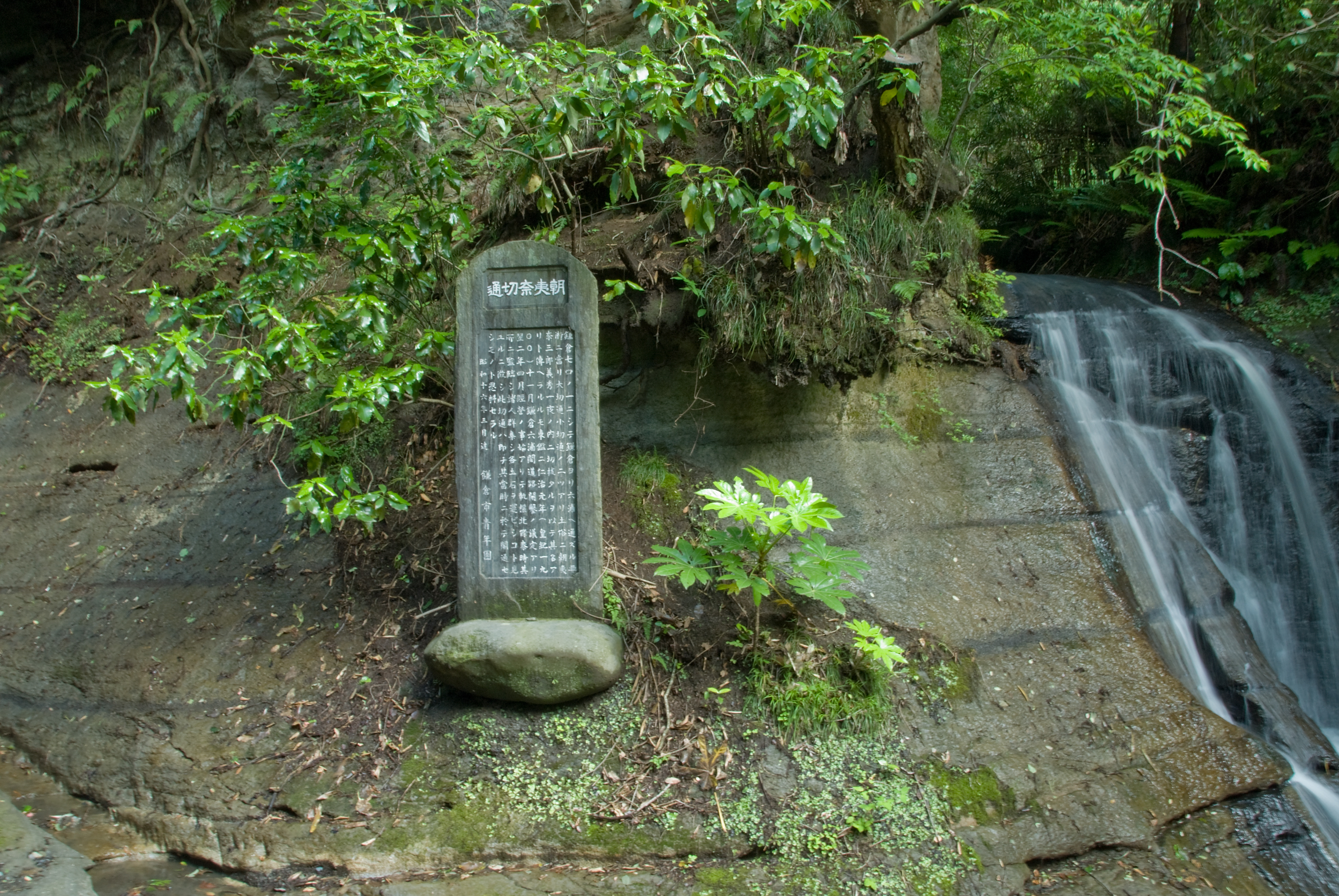
The Saburō Falls at the beginning of the Asaina Pass, both named after Asahina Yoshihide

Asahina Yoshihide (朝比奈 義秀) or Asaina Yoshihide, also known as Asahina Saburō (朝比奈 三朗), was a Japanese warrior of the early 13th century, and the son of Wada Yoshimori and Tomoe Gozen. His name (also written with the characters 朝夷奈 (Asaina)) comes from Awa no Kuni's (安房) Asaina-gun (朝夷奈郡), where he lived at one time. Though very likely a historical figure, Yoshihide appears in literature and in kabuki as a somewhat superhuman legendary character. According to these, his mother was the renowned female warrior Tomoe Gozen, and he had superhuman strength which he used to accomplish a number of stunning feats.

== Legends ==
Asahina's name is associated with some incredible feats. According to the Azuma Kagami, he and future shōgun Minamoto no Yoriie, who were good friends, one day were together in Kotsubo. Yoriie said he had heard what a good swimmer Yoshihide was, and challenged him to give a demonstration of his prowess. Immediately, Asahina jumped into the sea and soon re-emerged with two or three sharks in his fists. Asahina is also mentioned in the Soga Monogatari as having competed for strength with Soga Goro Tokimune.

In one of his most known legends, he is said to have opened the Asaina Pass by himself in one night, thus giving this extremely important pass his name.

== War against the Hōjō ==
A retainer of Minamoto no Yoriie, Yoshihide fought alongside his father and Yoriie in a revolt against the Hōjō in 1213. An account described how he led an army of Wada soldiers against Hōjō Yoshitoki, the shogunal regent. He was noted for his strength in battle and defeated a number of notable personalities in the shogunate such as Takai Shigemochi and Taka no Shikan. It was Yoshihide who raided and burned the Ōkura Bakufu, seat of Minamoto no Yoritomo's government. The Wada army, however, was defeated and Yoshitoki distributed the fiefs of the Wada estate to his loyal retainers. According to the Azuma Kagami, the 38-year-old Yoshihide fled to Awa no Kuni with 500 horsemen. Another account cited that after his father's death along with his brothers, he put to sea and escaped with fifty men. From this moment, his whereabouts are unknown but, according to the Wada family records (Wada Keizu (和田系図)), he fled first to Awa no Kuni, and then to Korea.
