= Kenin (band) =

Kenin is a Washington, DC–based-rock band. They have toured throughout the east coast, and have often performed with bands from the Boston area including Tim Blane and State Radio. Kenin formed in 2000 at Duke University and later re-located to Washington, DC. They release their albums through the independent, digital-focused label Holster Records, which they co-founded in 2004 with a New York-based business partner. Their most recent album, In (Places), was produced and mixed by the Virginia-based production duo of Chris Keup and Stewart Meyers, whose previous projects include Jason Mraz, Rachael Yamagata, and Johnathan Rice.

== Discography ==
- Left Behind (Holster, 2004)
- Just Another Blast (Holster, 2005)
- In Place(s) (Holster, 2006)

== Members ==
- Sean Gaiser – Guitar, Vocals
- Devin McGaughey – Drums
- Tommy Bullough – Bass
- Mark Erickson – Lead Guitar
