= Mōri Toyomoto =

Kokujin ryoshu (local samurai lord)

- 毛利 豊元

Head of Mōri clan

Personal details
- Born: 1444 Aki Province
- Died: 1476 (aged 31–32)

Military service
- Allegiance: Ōuchi clan
- Rank: Jizamurai
- Unit: Mōri clan
- Battles/wars: Ōnin War

Mōri Toyomoto (毛利 豊元, 1444–1476) was a Jizamurai of the province of Aki. He was the grandfather of Mōri Motonari. During the Ōnin War, he supported the Ōuchi clan and seized 16 territories.

In 1461–1462, Toyomoto defeated Hatakeyama Yoshinari's army in Kawachi and Kii.

During the year of 1465, Toyomoto then sent troops to assist Kobayakawa Hirohira when Ōuchi Masahiro invaded his holdings. During the fall of the same year, Ōuchi made an interventional against the current war between the Hosokawa and Kōno clans. At the request of the Ōuchi, Toyomoto then blocked the attack led by Masahiro.

Following the year of 1471, Toyotomo took advantage of the confusion generated by the Ōnin War to then establish himself under Ōuchi Masahiro, and pledging his allegiance to the Ōuchi clan.
