= Kenin (Japanese history) =

Feudal Japanese caste

Kenin (家人, house person) was the third of the five lower castes of the Japanese ritsuryō system. A privately owned servant, a kenin had a better social status than a slave (shinuhi (私奴婢)), could be inherited but not sold, could participate in the life of the family and have one of his own.

The term can also be synonymous with gokenin. The gokenin were vassals of the shōgun during the Kamakura, Ashikaga, and Tokugawa shogunates. The meaning of the term evolved in time, so its exact meaning changes with the historical period.
