= Mōri Suemitsu =

- 毛利 季光
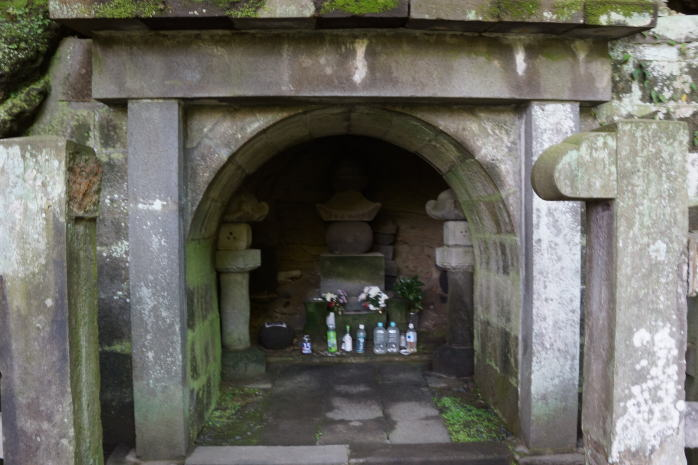
- Tomb of Suemitsu in Kamakura
- Born: 1202; Aki Province
- Died: July 8, 1247 (aged 44 or 45); Tajihi-Sarugake Castle, Aki Province
- Relatives: Ōe no Hiromoto (father)
- Military career
- Allegiance: Minamoto clan
- Rank: Daimyō (Lord)
- Nickname: Chiyojumaru (千代寿丸)
- Unit: Mōri clan

Mōri Suemitsu (毛利 季光; 1202 – July 8, 1247) was a samurai during the Kamakura period and a gokenin of the Kamakura shogunate. He was the fourth son of Ōe no Hiromoto. He was the founder of the Mōri clan.

He served three generations of the army of Minamoto no Sanetomo at Tsurugaoka Hachimangū. He took the name Mōri after the name of his estate in Sagami Province. He fought in the Jōkyū War in 1221. His wife was a daughter of Miura Yasumura and he fought with the Miura clan against the Hōjō clan.

In 1223 he became an official surveyor for the Kamakura shogunate. He was defeated by Hōjō Tokiyori in 1247 and committed suicide (seppuku) at Minamoto no Yoritomo's shrine (hokkedō) along with his Miura allies.

His grave (yagura) is in Kamakura, only a few hundred yards from the grave of Minamoto no Yoritomo along with his father and Shimazu Tadahisa, who founded the Shimazu clan. The Miura clan's family tomb is also nearby.

== See also ==
- Mōri clan
- Mōri Motonari
- Miura clan
- Minamoto no Yoritomo
- Minamoto no Sanetomo
