= Wada Yoshimori =

Japanese samurai lord

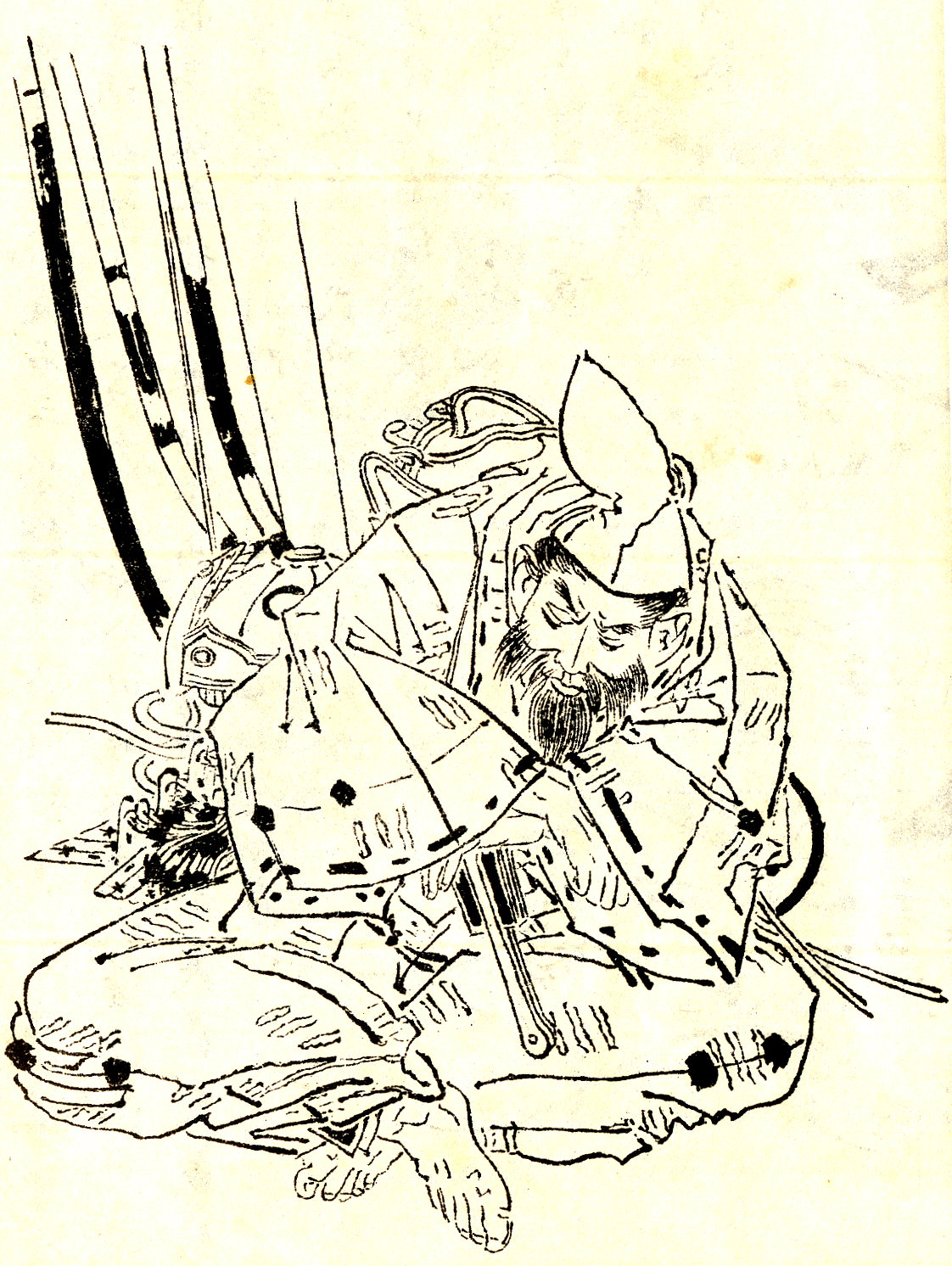
Wada Yoshimori by Kikuchi Yosai

Wada Yoshimori (和田 義盛, 1147 – May 24, 1213) was a Japanese samurai lord and gokenin of the early Kamakura period. He was the first director (bettō) of the Board of Retainers in the Kamakura shogunate.

== Life ==
Wada Yoshimori was born as the son of Miura Yoshiaki and grandson of Sugimoto Yoshimune, making him a descendant of the Taira clan.

Yoshimori "was attached to Noriyori as his saburai daisho (general of soldiers)."

He fought in the Battle of Ichi-no-Tani in 1184. He also fought in the Battle of Dan-no-ura, where he engaged Chikakiyo of Iyo in an archery duel.

Later, he participated in the campaigns against Kiso Yoshinaka in 1184 and Fujiwara no Yasuhira in 1189.

Among his sons were Wada Yoshinao, Asahina Yoshihide, and Wada Yoshishige. He also had a nephew, Wada Tanenaga.

Like many others, he and his family became victims of the struggle for power that followed the death of the first Kamakura shōgun Minamoto no Yoritomo. Tension had been growing between the Hōjō Regents and Wada, and open war started when Wada Yoshinao, Wada Yoshishige and Wada Tanenaga were accused of conspiracy and arrested. Yoshimori, who was in Kazusa, returned to Kamakura and managed to free his two sons. Tanenaga was however detained and exiled to Mutsu province. War ensued (the so-called Wada Gassen (和田合戦)) and in 1213 he was defeated and killed together with his family. The Wada are traditionally supposed to be buried in the Wadazuka Mound in Kamakura, however this is only an unproven theory born after excavations in situ during the Meiji period.
