= Shōen =

Japanese term meaning field or manor

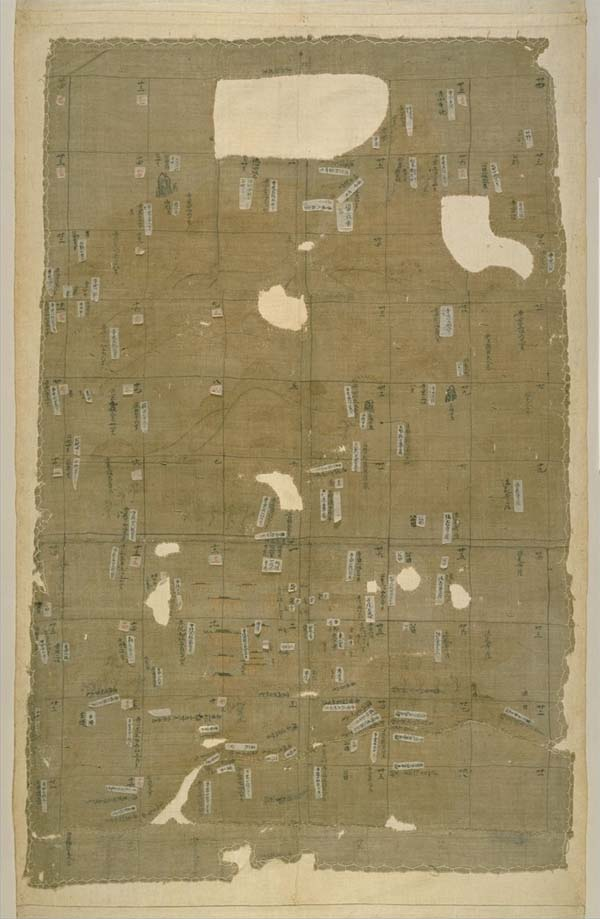
Map of Nara-period shōen at Nukuta-dera in present-day Yamatokōriyama, Nara Prefecture. 8th century, in the collection of the National Museum of Japanese History

A shōen (荘園 or 庄園, shōen) was a field or manor in Japan. The Japanese term comes from the Tang dynasty Chinese term "莊園" (Mandarin: zhuāngyuán, Cantonese: zong1 jyun4).

Shōen, from about the 8th to the late 15th century, describes any of the private, tax free, often autonomous estates or manors whose rise undermined the political and economic power of the emperor and contributed to the growth of powerful local clans. The estates developed from land tracts assigned to officially sanctioned Shintō shrines or Buddhist temples or granted by the emperor as gifts to the Imperial family, friends, or officials. As these estates grew, they became independent of the civil administrative system and contributed to the rise of a local military class. With the establishment of the Kamakura shogunate in 1192, centrally appointed stewards weakened the power of these local landlords. The shōen system passed out of existence around the middle of the 15th century, when villages became self-governing units, owing loyalty to a feudal lord (daimyō) who subdivided the area into fiefs and collected a fixed tax.

After the decay of the ritsuryō system, a feudal system of manors developed. Landowners or nameholders commended shares of the revenue produced (called shiki) to more powerful leaders often at the court, in order to be exempted from taxes and to subvert the Chinese-style "equal fields" system, whereby land was redistributed after certain periods of time. In the Kamakura period a hierarchy of nameholder, manor stewards (jitō), shugo (military provincial governor), and the shōgun in Kamakura had evolved. These shōen were completely free from interference from the government, which therefore had no say or control of what occurred within the shōen's boundaries.

By the end of the Heian period virtually all Japanese land had become shōen and continued to be through the Ōnin War until the Sengoku period.

== History ==
Shōen appeared in the 8th century and disappeared in the 16th century. They can be distinguished by historical period, and a shōen of each period had specific features in its formation and relationships with the cultivators of its fields. There are two primary periods of shōen development, although in fact smaller and more detailed categorizations exist. The first type, which developed in the middle of the Nara period, are now called shoki-shōen (初期庄園, lit. "early Shōen"). Shōen of the second type, which continued from the middle of Heian period to the Sengoku period, are called chūsei-shōen (中世荘園, lit. "medieval Shōen"). Note that these names and the distinction between the two are modern concepts, and were not used historically and cannot be found in the historical record.

=== Before ritsuryō system ===
The earliest antecedent of the shōen are tatokoro or naritokoro (田庄); which is thought to be one of the etymologies of the term shōen. Before the ritsuryō system or Taika Reform (645), land was divided up between powerful families historically called gōzoku (豪族) or influential Buddhist temples, and they placed facilities called yake (宅) in those lands in order to preside over agricultural management, armament, traffic, and trades. In early documents, the terms yake and tatokoro were used almost interchangeably to refer to those administrative facilities, and so tatokoro are thought to have had functions similar to yake. Before long, however, the meaning of tatokoro was extended to represent not only the originally indicated administrative facilities but also the cultivated land which they administrated.

=== Land policies in the Nara period ===
New policies of the central government during the Nara period, initially designed to encourage reclamation, played an important role in the development of shōen. The land policy of the ritsuryō was called handen-shūju-sei (班田収受制), and was similar to Chinese equal-field land system (均田制), but there was a difference in the treatment of reclaimed fields. If someone reclaimed wasteland in Japan at that time, the field would be dispossessed and he could not cultivate the field; while if someone reclaimed a field in China, he could cultivate the land providing that the field was smaller than legally prescribed dimensions. Therefore, there was no incentive to reclaim land and develop new fields, and little land was reclaimed although the population was steadily increasing. The shortage of fields thus became a social and economic problem. To solve this, in 723 the central government promulgated the law of sanze-isshin-hō (三世一身法), which promoted reclamation. This law allowed one to cultivate any field one reclaimed, and if certain conditions were satisfied, the fields reclaimed by one's parents or grandparents. Twenty years later, in 743 the central government promulgated a further law promoting reclamation, called konden-einen-shizai-hō (墾田永年私財法) which provided for the succession of the right to cultivate reclaimed fields in perpetuity. This law resulted in massive reclamation by wealthy people, and this reclamation in turn had a significant impact on the development of shōen.

=== Shoki-shōen ===
One feature that distinguishes early or shoki-shōen from medieval shōen is their manner of formation. Most shoki-shōen were established by a Buddhist temple or a central noble by obtaining ownership of either of two kinds of paddy fields: those that had existed prior to the temple's or noble's ownership; and those that were reclaimed under the order of the temple or the noble which ruled a shōen. Shōen composed primarily of newly reclaimed land characterized shoki shōen, and accordingly shoki-shōen are sometimes called kondenchi-kei-shōen (墾田地系荘園, lit. 'estates of reclaimed fields.').

Another feature of shoki-shōen is annual rental system of paddy fields. There were no permanent inhabitants of shoki-shōen and the fields of shoki-shōen did not have regular cultivators, so cultivation rights were rented out on a contract of a year to peasants who inhabited the neighborhood around the shōen. Therefore, it was indispensable to recruit help of peasants, who did nearly all the work of cultivation, in order to ensure stable labor force for cultivation and reclamation of new fields. An owner of a shoki-shōen often utilized the local government system of Daijō-kan, kuni and kōri to meet this need; an owner of shoki-shōen who usually had been assigned by the central government as a kokushi (国司, a head or officer of kuni) appointed a local chief of the peasants to be a gunji (郡司, a head or officer of kōri) to recruit and administer labor for the shōen.

=== Formation of Chūsei-shōen ===
Medieval or chūsei-shōen are different from shoki-shōen mainly in existence of shōmin (荘民, peasants permanently residing on shōen land) and in the power the owner of the shōen had over the shōmin. While shoki-shōen did not have any shōmin and the owner's rule of cultivators was weaker than that of the government, chūsei-shōen had shōmin and most of the cultivators were shōmin, and the shōen owner's rule became more powerful than that of the government. The owner of a shōen could expel peasants who were not obedient to him from the shōen, and could promulgate his own penal codes for criminal offenses or treason in order to ensure this control over the shōmin. That is to say shōen owners, who originally cultivated influence with the government in the capital during the Nara period, came to discard the connection with the central government and to cultivate their power over local peasants.

Another distinguishing feature of chūsei-shōen are their exemptions from some kinds of tax imposed by the central government. In the middle or the end of the Heian period there were two types of tax. One type of tax was corvee labor under the supervision of kuni, and the other was a tax on farm products (about three percent of rice or other farm products). To evade these taxes, peasants wanted to be ruled and protected by the shōen owners, which was usually a politically influential Buddhist temple, Shinto shrine or court noble. To achieve this protection by the shōen owners, peasants donated the nominal land ownership of the fields they cultivated to shōen owners. These fields, nominally donated to the ownership of a shōen were historically called kishinchi (寄進地, "donated lands"). Then the shōen owners who received "donated lands" from the shōmin peasant populace negotiated with the kokushi or directly with the central government and achieved tax exempt status. Most chūsei-shōen gathered vast amounts fields through the process of receiving donated lands from peasants as kishinchi. In this sense, chūsei-shōen is sometimes called kishinchi-kei-shōen (寄進地系荘園, lit. "estates of donated fields").

Meanwhile, there also appeared shōen which gathered territory by depriving peasants of land ownership. In some cases, shōen owners would demand tribute from peasants cultivating neighboring fields and if the peasants could not pay that tribute, the shōen confiscated the fields. In other cases, a peasant could not repay the rent for cultivation rights of shōen land, and the shōen owner who was the cultivator's creditor foreclosed on the cultivator's land rights as substitution of the credit, in which case the peasant became bound to the shōen as a shōmin, rather than a tenant cultivator. This kind of shōen is sometimes called konden-shūseki-shōen (墾田集積荘園, lit, "estates of accumulated fields").

There were several kinds of chūsei-shōen, and each kind of shōen had particular process of achieving exemption from tax:

==== Kanshōfu-shō ====
Kanshōfu-sho (官省符荘) is shōen where exemption from so (租, a kind of tax, three percent of total harvest of rice) was allowed in official procedures. In the ritsuryō system, powerful Shinto shrines and Buddhist temples had the right to receive rice as support from the central government. Each shrines or temples were allotted particular fields to, and the rice was levied as so from peasants cultivating the allotted fields. In the 8th century in some shōen, semi-permanent land ownership of the fields and exemption from so in the fields was permitted by Daijō-kan, which administered exemption of tax, and the Ministry of Popular Affairs (民部省, Minbushō) notified the owner of the fields about the permission using the document called the minbushō-fu (民部省符, "Popular Affairs certificate") or "charter". Later the permission by Daijō-kan not for temples or shrines but for powerful noble was gradually increased.

==== Kokumen-shō ====
Kokumen-shō (国免荘) is shōen allowed exemption from so or other tribute in bempo or binho (便補) system. At that time kuni had an obligation to pay to shōen owner the benefits the amount of which was determined as to his dignity by the central government. Bempo system is a means usually used when kuni could not prepare the benefits since the taxation from peasants cultivating public fields did not function well; kuni transferred shōen owner its right of taxation from fields the dimensions of which was corresponding to the amount of the benefits. This field was usually selected, according to shōen owner's request, from fields which shōen owner had received from peasants as kishinchi, and this means practical exemption from tax. This system was not admitted by the central government and a contract of bempo became invalid when the term of tenure of the kokushi who contracted was over. However, in most case the new kokushi could not refuse shōen owner's request of continuation of a contract because they felt sorry for accumulated debt of the delinquent benefits, which had not paid while bempo was performed as substitution of payment. Consequently, these fields were established as an area exempt from so or other tribute imposed by the central government.

In the 10th and 11th century kokumen-shō was rapidly increased, and in 1040 the central government was not able to continue ignoring kokumen-shō and finally explicitly prohibited kuni's new permission of exemption of tax. This ordinance is now called chōkyū-shōen-seiri-rei ("The Order for Disposal of Shōen in Chōkyū Era" in Japanese).

==== Rinjizōyaku-menjo-shōen ====
Rinjizōyaku (臨時雑役) is a general term of variant labor imposed to peasants as tax by the government from the middle to the end of the Heian period, and rinjizōyaku-menjo-shōen (臨時雑役免除荘園) is shōen allowed exemption of rinjizōyaku. There were two main processes of formation of rinjizōyaku-menjo-shōen. One was the process of shōen owner's negotiation with kokushi; shōen owner abandoned the right of using a part of labor force of rinjizōyaku and instead achieved exemption from rinjizōyaku of peasants living in particular area. The other is the process of bempo system. However, repeated exemption of rinjizōyaku resulted in the shortage of kishinchi of some shōen owners which was remained not exempt from rinjizōyaku. While practicing bempo, if all the kishinchi of the shōen owner was exempt from rinjizōyaku, shōen owner was provided with the right of using labor force of particular public fields. This resulted in absorption of public fields into shōen territory, and in the 11th century new exemption from rinjizōyaku of fields which had neither exemption of so nor that of other tributes was prohibited.

=== Shōen in the Muromachi period ===
In the aftermath of the Ōnin War, the power of the shōen disappeared as new daimyō came in control of the court. These daimyo dissolved or destroyed the shōen, preferring to keep the peasants under their direct control, and effectively making them serfs in return for their protection.

== See also ==
- Ritsuryō system
- Uji system
- Fiefdom
- Serfdom
- History of Japan
