= Egara Tenjin Shrine =

Shinto shrine in Kanagawa Prefecture, Japan

Egara Tenjin-sha
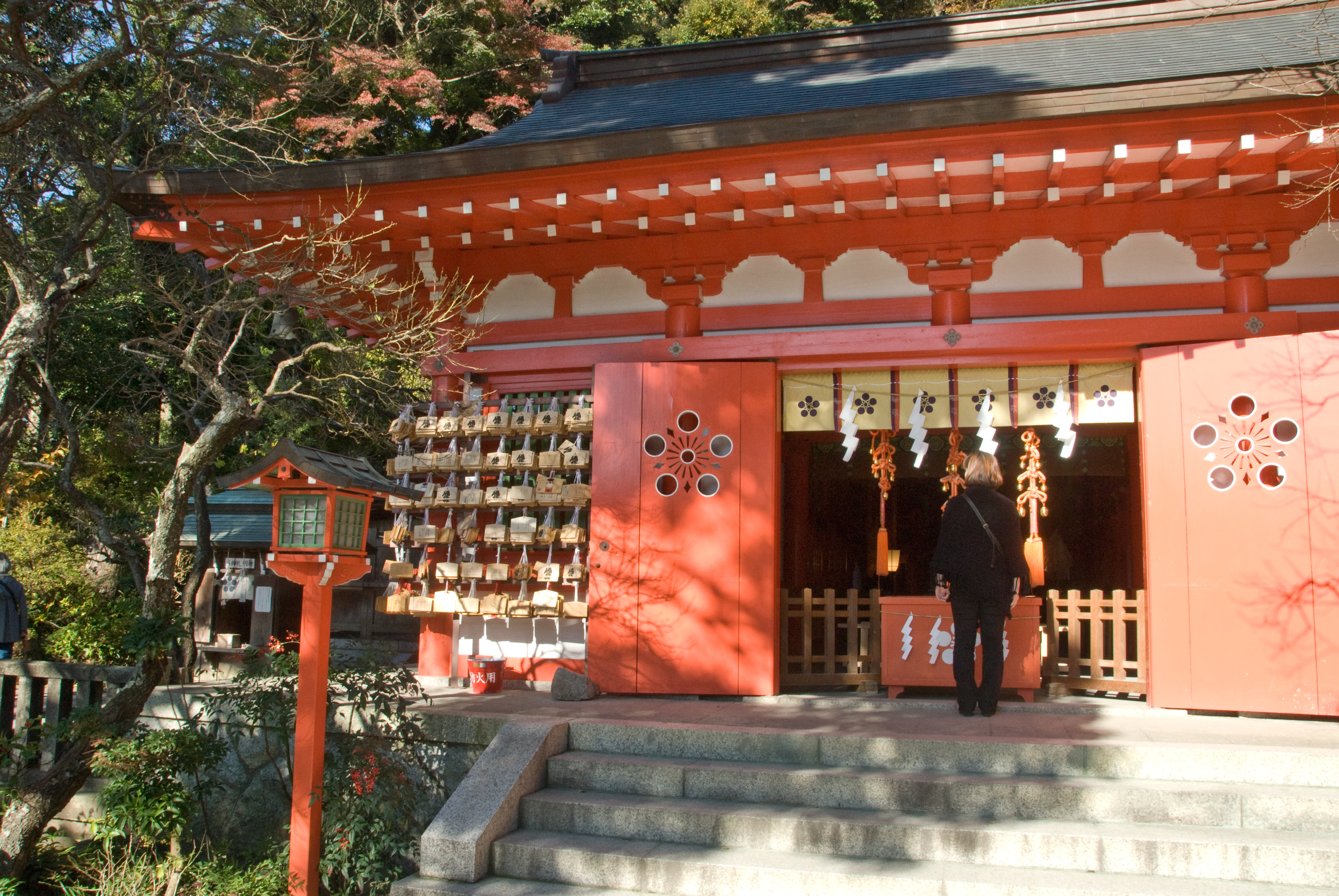
- The haiden

- Location within Japan

Religion
- Affiliation: Shinto
- Deity: Sugawara no Michizane / Tenjin

Location
- Interactive map of Egara Tenjin-sha
- Coordinates: 35°32′58″N 139°56′42″E

Architecture
- Founder: Unknown
- Established: 1104

Egara Tenjin Shrine (荏柄天神社, Egara Tenjinsha), is a Shinto shrine in Kamakura. Having been founded according to legend by an unknown priest in 1104, it is one of the few extant religious institutions in the area to predate the advent of Minamoto no Yoritomo, who arrived here in 1181. Like all other Tenjin shrines in Japan, it enshrines the spirit of famous scholar and politician Sugawara no Michizane under the name Tenjin. For this reason, the kami is believed to be a protector of intellectual pursuits.

Having been unjustly sent into exile, where he died, Michizane was deified and enshrined to pacify his soul, which was believed to be angry as a consequence. Numerous calamities that followed his death validated this belief.

The shrine, described as "in bad shape" a century ago by Iso Mutsu, has been completely rebuilt and consists of an oratory (haiden) and of a sacrarium (honden). Both are painted in the traditional Shinto vermilion color.
