= Jitō =

Japanese medieval territorial stewards

Jitō (地頭) were medieval territory stewards in Japan, especially in the Kamakura and Muromachi shogunates. Appointed by the shōgun, jitō managed manors, including national holdings governed by the kokushi or provincial governor. There were also deputy jitō called jitōdai (地頭代).

== History ==
The term jitō (literally meaning "land head") began to be used in the late Heian period as an adjectival word. For example, a jitō person (地頭人) meant an influential local. Later, the term was sometimes used for persons who managed each local manor. Modern historians cannot clarify the character of the early jitō appointed by Minamoto no Yoritomo, as the conditions of these precursors are not well known.

Jitō were officially established when Minamoto no Yoritomo was appointed to oversee their ennoblement by the Imperial court following his successful usurpation of power. Yoritomo appointed many jitō nationwide, mainly in the Kantō region. During the Kamakura period, the jitō were chosen amongst the ranks of gokenin (the shogun's vassals) who handled military affairs. Jitō handled the taxation and administration of the manor to which they were appointed, and directly administered the lands and the farmers of the manor.

After the Jōkyū War in 1221, the shogunate appointed many jitō in Western Japan to the land that the people of the losing side and imperial court had possessed. At that time, many prominent gokenin, including the Mori clan and the Ōtomo clan, moved from the east to the west.

The role of jitō was officially abolished in the late of 16th century by Toyotomi Hideyoshi, one of the "three great unifiers of Japan".

The elimination of the jitō removed Imperial recognition and support from dozens of small warlords and weakened the intense rivalries that had fueled centuries of civil conflict, thus enabling the more easily controlled and reliable daimyo to consolidate ownership of the land. This, in turn, laid the foundations for the last major feudal era of Japan, the Edo period.
