= Nitobe =

Nitobe is the surname of a Japanese Samurai family and refers to:

- Nitobe Inazō
  - Nitobe Bunka College, named after Inazō
  - Nitobe Memorial Garden, named after Inazō
- Nitobe Jūjirō
- Nitobe Koretami
- Nitobe Tsutō

See also:

- Nitobeia
