= Bibliography of Japanese history =

The bibliography covers the main scholarly books, and a few articles, dealing with the History of Japan

== Surveys and reference ==
- Allinson, Gary D. The Columbia Guide to Modern Japanese History. (1999). 259 pp.
- Beasley, W. G. The Modern History of Japan (1963)
- Clement, Ernest Wilson. A Short History of Japan (1915), 190pp online edition
- Cullen, L. M. A History of Japan, 1582-1941: Internal and External Worlds (2003)
- Edgerton, Robert B. Warriors of the Rising Sun: A History of the Japanese Military. (1999). 384 pp.
- Duus, Peter. Modern Japan (2nd ed 1998) online
- Goedertier Joseph M. A Dictionary of Japanese History. 1968.
- Gordon, Andrew. A Modern History of Japan: From Tokugawa Times to the Present (2003)
- Hall, John Whitney. Japan: From Prehistory to Modern Times (New York: Delacorte Press, 1970)
- Hane, Mikiso. Modern Japan: A Historical Survey 2nd ed Westview Press, 1992, 474pp
- Henshall, Kenneth. A history of Japan: from stone age to superpower (Palgrave Macmillan, 2012)
- Huffman, James L., ed. Modern Japan: An Encyclopedia of History, Culture, and Nationalism. (1998). 316 pp.
- Hunter Janet. Concise Dictionary of Modern Japanese History. (1984). online
- Iwao, Seiichi. Biographical dictionary of Japanese history (1978) online
- Jansen, Marius B. The Making of Modern Japan (2002)
- McClain, James L. Japan: A Modern History. (2001). 512 pp.
- Morley, James William, ed. Japan's foreign policy, 1868-1941: a research guide (Columbia UP, 1974), Chapters by international experts who cover military policy, economic policy, cultural policy, and relations with Britain, China, Germany, Russia, and the United States; 635pp
- Mosk, Carl. Japanese Industrial History: Technology, Urbanization, and Economic Growth. M. E. Sharpe, 2001. 293 pp.
- Najita, Tetsuo. Japan: The Intellectual Foundations of Modern Japanese Politics (1980), 200 year interpretation
- Perez, Louis G. The History of Japan (1998) 244pp
- Perkins, Dorothy. Encyclopedia of Japan : Japanese history and culture, from abacus to zori (1991) online free to borrow 410 pp.
- Reischauer, Edwin O. Japan: The Story of a Nation. 1990.
- Reischauer, Edwin O., and Albert M. Craig. Japan, Tradition and Transformation 1978.
- Sims, Richard. Japanese Political History since the Meiji Renovation, 1868-2000. (2001). 395 pp.
- Stockwin, J. A. A. Dictionary of the Modern Politics of Japan. (2003). 291pp
- Tipton, Elise. Modern Japan: A Social and Political History (2002)
- Totman, Conrad. A History of Japan. (3rd ed 2014). 620 pp.; stress on environment
  - Totman, Conrad. Early Modern Japan: A Short History (1995)
  - Totman, Conrad. Japan before Perry (2nd paperback ed. 2008)
  - Totman, Conrad. Japan: An Environmental History (2014)
- Umesao, Tadao. An Ecological View of History: Japanese Civilization in the World Context. Melbourne: Trans Pacific Press, 2003. 208 pp.

=== East Asian history ===
- Best, Antony, ed. The International History of East Asia, 1900-1968: Trade, Ideology and the Quest for Order (London: Routledge, 2010).
- Chickering, Roger, and Stig Förster, eds. The Shadows of Total War: Europe, East Asia, and the United States, 1919-1939 (New York: Cambridge University Press, 2003).
- Clyde, Paul Hibbert. The Far East: A History of the Impact of the West on Eastern Asia. (New York: Prentice-Hall, 1948).
- Clyde, Paul Hibbert. A History of the Modern and Contemporary Far East: A Survey of Western Contacts with Eastern Asia during the Nineteenth and Twentieth Centuries (New York: Prentice-Hall, 1937).
- Ebrey, Patricia Buckley, and Anne Walthall. East Asia: A Cultural, Social, and Political History (2 vol. 2008-2013)
- Field, Andrew. Royal Navy Strategy in the Far East, 1919-1939: Preparing for War against Japan (Portland, OR: Frank Cass, 2003).
- Holcombe, Charles. A History of East Asia: From the Origins of Civilization to the Twenty-First Century (2010)
- Jensen, Richard, Jon Davidann, and Yoneyuki Sugita, eds. Trans-Pacific Relations: America, Europe, and Asia in the Twentieth Century (Westport, CT: Praeger, 2003).
- Lipman, Jonathan N. and Barbara A. Molony. Modern East Asia: An Integrated History (2011)
- Nimmo, William F. Stars and Stripes across the Pacific: The United States, Japan, and Asia/Pacific Region, 1895-1945 (Praeger, 2001).
- Prescott, Anne. East Asia in the World: An Introduction (2015)
- Reid, Anthony. A History of Southeast Asia: Critical Crossroads (Blackwell History of the World, 2015)
- Shavit, David. The United States in Asia: A Historical Dictionary (Greenwood Press, 1990).
- Vogel, Ezra F. China and Japan: Facing History (Harvard University Press, 2019) in-depth comparative history.

== to 1860 ==
- Clulow, Adam. The Company and the Shogun: The Dutch Encounter with Tokugawa Japan (Columbia University Press, 2014)
- Friday, Karl F., ed. Japan Emerging: Premodern History to 1850 (Westview Press, 2012)
- Gerstle, C. Andrew. 18th Century Japan: Culture and Society (Routledge, 2012)
- Gramlich-Oka, Bettina, and Gregory Smits, eds. Economic Thought in Early Modern Japan. V. 1, Monies, Markets, and Finance in East Asia (Leiden: Brill, 2010)
- Hall, John W. ed. Cambridge History of Japan, Vol. IV, Early Modern Japan. (1991). 831pp
- Hall, S. Japan before Tokugawa: political consolidation and economic growth, 1500-1650 (Princeton University Press, 2014)
- Hane, Mikiso. Premodern Japan: A Historical Survey (1991)
- Hanley, Susan B. and Kozo Yamamura. Economic and Demographic Change in Preindustrial Japan, 1600-1868 (1977)
- Jansen, Marius B., ed. The Cambridge History of Japan. Vol. 5: The Nineteenth Century. (1989). 828 pp.
- Jansen, Marius B., and Gilbert Rozman, eds. Japan in transition: from Tokugawa to Meiji (Princeton University Press, 2014)
- Maruyama, Masao. Studies in Intellectual History of Tokugawa Japan (Princeton University Press, 2014)
- Sansom, Sir George B. A History of Japan, 3 vols. 1963, in dense, sophisticated prose
- Smitka, Michael, ed. The Japanese economy in the Tokugawa era, 1600-1868 (Routledge, 2012)
- Totman, Conrad (1986). "Tokugawa Peasants: Win, Lose, or Draw?". Monumenta Nipponica. 41 (4): 457–476. JSTOR 2384863.
- Williams, E. Leslie. Japan Before Meiji: A Short Cultural History (University of Hawai'I Press, 2014)
- Wilson, George M. Patriots and Redeemers in Japan: Motives in the Meiji Restoration. (1992). 201 pp.
- Yamamura Kozo, ed. Cambridge History of Japan, Vol. III. Medieval Japan. (1990).
- Yamamura, Kozo. "Toward a Reexamination of the Economic History of Tokugawa Japan, 1600-1867." Journal of Economic History 33(3) (1973) pp. 509–546. in Jstor

== 1860 to 1945 ==
- Akagi, Roy Hidemichi. Japan's Foreign Relations 1542-1936: A Short History (1979) online 560pp.
- Bix, Herbert P. Hirohito and the Making of Modern Japan (HarperCollins, 2001), a standard biography online; Pulitzer Prize.
  - Bix, Herbert. "Emperor Hirohito's war." History Today 41.12 (1991): 12-19; short popular summary
- Black, Cyril, et al. eds. The Modernization of Japan and Russia: A Comparative Study (1977)
- Borton, Hugh. Japan's modern century (2nd ed 1970), 1850 to 1970; university textbook; online
- Cohen, Jerome B. Japan's Economy in War and Reconstruction (1949) 545 pp.
- Dickinson, Frederick R. "Toward a Global Perspective of the Great War: Japan and the Foundations of a Twentieth-Century World." American Historical Review (2014) 119#4 pp1154–1183. The role of World War I
- Dower, John W. War without Mercy: Race and Power in the Pacific War. Pantheon, 1986. 398 pp.
- Duus, Peter, ed. The Cambridge History of Japan: Vol. 6: The Twentieth Century. (1989). 866 pp.
- Havens, Thomas R. Valley of Darkness: The Japanese People and World War II. 1978.
- Havens, Thomas R. "Women and War in Japan, 1937–1945." American Historical Review 80 (1975): 913–934. online in JSTOR
- Hofmann, Reto (2015). The Fascist Effect: Japan and Italy, 1915-1952. Ithaca: Cornell University Press. doi:10.7591/cornell/9780801453410.001.0001. ISBN 978-0-8014-5636-7. JSTOR 10.7591/j.ctt20d88b6. OCLC 1080551374. Project MUSE book 57677. Full access available to users of The Wikipedia Library.
- Hunter, Janet. The emergence of modern Japan: an introductory history since 1853 (Routledge, 2014)
- Iriye, Akira. Power and Culture: The Japanese-American War, 1941-1945 (1981),
- Jansen, Marius B. and Rozman, Gilbert, eds. Japan in Transition, from Tokugawa to Meiji. (1986). 485 pp. modernization models
- Keene, Donald. Emperor of Japan: Meiji and His World, 1852-1912. (2002). 928 pp.
- LaFeber, Walter. The Clash: A History of U.S.-Japan Relations. (1997). 544 pp.
- Megarry, Tim, ed. The Making of Modern Japan: A Reader (Greenwich University Press, 1995) 34 essays by scholars; 591pp
- Nakamura, Takafusa, et al. eds. Economic History of Japan 1914–1955: A Dual Structure (vol 3 2003)
- Perez, Louis G., ed. Japan at War: An Encyclopedia (2013) pp 477–98
- Ravina, Mark. To stand with the nations of the world: Japan's Meiji restoration in world history (Oxford UP, 2020)
- Sims, Richard. Japanese Political History since the Meiji Renovation, 1868-2000. Palgrave, 2001. 395 pp.
- Ward, Robert E., ed. Political Development in Modern Japan: Studies in the Modernization of Japan (Princeton University Press, 2015)
- Yoshimi, Yoshiaki. Grassroots Fascism: The War Experience of the Japanese People (Translated by Ethan Mark. Columbia University Press, 2015). 360 pp. online review

=== Occupation: 1945-1952 ===
- Buckley, Roger. Occupation Diplomacy: Britain, the United States and Japan, 1945-1952. (1982). 294 pp.
- Cohen, Jerome B. Japan's Economy in War and Reconstruction (1949) 545 pp. * Cohen, Theodore. Remaking Japan: The American Occupation as New Deal. (1987). 526 pp.
- Cook, Haruko Taya, and Theodore Cook. Japan at War: An Oral History 1992.
- Dower, John. Japan in War and Peace 1993.
- Dower, John W. Embracing Defeat: Japan in the Wake of World War II. (1999). 688 pp.
- Eldridge, Robert. The Origins of the Bilateral Okinawa Problem: Okinawa in Postwar US-Japan Relations, 1945-1952 (2001)
- Finn, Richard B. Winners in Peace: MacArthur, Yoshida, and Postwar Japan. (1992). 413 pp.
- Hane, Mikiso. Eastern Phoenix: Japan since 1945 (1996)
- Harvey, Robert. American Shogun: General MacArthur, Emperor Hirohito, and the Drama of Modern Japan. (2006). 480 pp.
- Hellegers, Dale M. We, the Japanese People: World War II and the Origins of the Japanese Constitution. (2 vol. 2002). 826 pp.
- Hewes Jr., Laurence I. Japan -- Land and Men: An Account of the Japanese Land Reform Program, 1945-51 154 pgs. (1955)
- Hirano, Kyoko. Mr. Smith Goes to Tokyo: The Japanese Cinema under the American Occupation, 1945-1952. (1992). 400 pp.
- Koseki, Shoichi. The Birth of Japan's Postwar Constitution. (1997). 257 pp
- Koshiro, Yukiko. Trans-Pacific Racisms and the U.S. Occupation of Japan. (1999). 295 pp.
- Molasky, Michael S. The American Occupation of Japan and Okinawa: Literature and Memory. (1999). 244 pp.
- Moore, Ray A. and Robinson, Donald L. Partners for Democracy: Crafting the New Japanese State under MacArthur. (2002). 409 pp.
- Orbaugh, Sharalyn. Japanese Fiction of the Allied Occupation: Vision, Embodiment, Identity. (2007). 515 pp.
- Sandler, Mark, ed. The Confusion Era: Art and Culture in Japan during the Allied Occupation, 1945-52. (1998). 112 pp.
- Schonberger, Howard B. Aftermath of War: Americans and the Remaking of Japan, 1945-1952 (1989)
- Schaller, Michael. The American Occupation of Japan: The Origins of the Cold War in Asia (1987)
- Shibata, Masako. Japan and Germany under the US Occupation: A Comparative Analysis of Post-War Education Reform. (2005). 212 pp.
- Sodei, Rinjiro. Dear General MacArthur: Letters from the Japanese during the American Occupation. (2001). 308 pp., primary sources
- Takemae, Eiji. Inside GHQ: The Allied Occupation of Japan and Its Legacy. (2002). 800 pp.
- VanStaaveren, Jacob. An American in Japan, 1945-1948: A Civilian View of the Occupation. (1995). 286 pp. primary course
- Ward, Robert E. and Yoshikazu, Sakamoto. Democratizing Japan: The Allied Occupation. (1987). 456 pp.
- Williams, Justin, Sr. Japan's Political Revolution Under MacArthur: A Participant's Account. (1979). 317 pp. primary source
- Yoshida, Shigeru. The Yoshida Memoirs: The Story of Japan in Crisis 1961, primary source online edition

== Since 1952 ==
- Allinson, Gary D. Japan's Postwar History. (2nd ed 2004). 208 pp.
- Beauchamp, Edward R., ed. Education and Schooling in Japan since 1945 (Routledge, 2014)
- Chapman, J.W.M., Reinhard Drifte, and Ian T.M. Gow, eds. Japan's Quest for Comprehensive Security: Defence-Diplomacy-Dependence (A&C Black, 2013)
- Duus, Peter, ed. The Cambridge History of Japan: Vol. 6: The Twentieth Century. (1989). 866 pp.
- Hane, Mikiso. Eastern Phoenix: Japan since 1945 (1996) online edition
- Hook, Glenn D. et al. Japan's International Relations: Politics, Economics and Security (2nd ed. Routledge, 2011)
- LaFeber, Walter. The Clash: A History of U.S.-Japan Relations. (1997). 544 pp., The standard history
- Neary, Ian. Leaders and leadership in Japan (Routledge, 2014)
- Scalapino, Robert A., ed. The Foreign Policy of Modern Japan (University of California Press, 1977)
- Shinoda, Tomohito. Contemporary Japanese Politics: Institutional Changes and Power Shifts (Columbia University Press, 2013)
- Sims, Richard. Japanese Political History since the Meiji Renovation, 1868-2000. Palgrave, 2001. 395 pp.
- Sugihara, Kaoru. Japan, China, and the Growth of the Asian International Economy, 1850-1949 - Vol. 1 (2005) online edition
- Sumiya, Mikio, ed. A History of Japanese Trade and Industry Policy. (2000). 662 pp.
- Van Wolferen, Karel. The enigma of Japanese power: People and politics in a stateless nation (1989)A that

== Cultural and social history ==
- Craig, Albert M.; Shively, Donald H. Personality in Japanese History (1995)
- Dore, R. P. Aspects of Social Change in Modern Japan (1971)
- Dumoulin, Heinrich. Zen Buddhism: A History. Vol. 2. Japan. (1989). 509 pp.
- Duus, Peter, ed. The Japanese Discovery of America: A Brief History with Documents. (1997). 226 pp.
- Earhart, H. Byron. Japanese Religion: Unity and Diversity (1974).
- Guttmann, Allen and Thompson, Lee. Japanese Sports: A History. (2001). 368 pp.
- Hanley, Susan B. and Kozo Yamamura. Economic and Demographic Change in Preindustrial Japan, 1600-1868 (1977)
- Harootunian, Harry. History's Disquiet: Modernity, Cultural Practice, and the Question of Everyday Life. (2000). 182 pp.
- Keene, Donald. Japanese Literature: An Introduction for Western Readers (1955)
- Morris, Ivan. The World of the Shining Prince: Court Life in Ancient Japan (1964)
- Kitagawa Joseph M. Religion in Japanese History. 1966.
- Kuitert, Wybe. Themes in the History of Japanese Garden Art (2002). 283 pp.
- Leiter, Samuel L. A Kabuki Reader: History and Performance. (2002). 430 pp.
- Mason, Penelope. History of Japanese Art. (1993). 431 pp.
- Morris-Suzuki, Tessa. A History of Japanese Economic Thought (1991) online edition
- Munsterberg, Hugo. The Arts of Japan: An Illustrated History (1957)
- Roberts, Laurance P. A. Dictionary of Japanese Artists. Tokyo: 1976.
- Sansom, Sir George B. Japan, A Short Cultural History. 1978. online edition
- Siever, Sharon Flowers in Salt: The Beginning of Feminine Consciousness in Modern Japan (1983)
- Standish, Isolde. A New History of Japanese Cinema: A Century of Narrative Film. (2005). 452 pp.
- Stanley, Amy. Selling women: Prostitution, markets, and the household in early modern Japan (U of California Press, 2012).
- Thomas, James Edward. Modern Japan: a social history since 1868 (Routledge, 2017)
- Tonomura, Hitomi; Walthall, Anne; and Haruko, Wakita. Women and Class in Japanese History (1999).
- Wakabayashi, Bob Tadashi. Modern Japanese Thought. (1998). 403 pp.
- Varley, Paul Herbert. Japanese Culture (4th ed. 2000). online

== Economic history ==
- Allen, George. Short Economic History of Modern Japan (4th ed. 1981) online
- Cohen, Jerome B. Japan's Economy in War and Reconstruction (1949) 545 pp; on 1940s
- Black, Cyril, ed. The Modernization of Japan and Russia: A Comparative Study (1975) online
- Dore, Ronald. Taking Japan seriously: A Confucian perspective on leading economic issues (A&C Black, 2013).
- Ericson, Steven J. The Sound of the Whistle: Railroads and the State in Meiji Japan (Harvard Council on East Asian Studies, 1996).
- Ferris, William W. Japan to 1600: A Social and Economic History (2009)
- Flath, David. The Japanese Economy (3rd ed. Oxford UP, 2014), On current conditions.
- Gordon, Andrew, ed. Postwar Japan as History (1993), pp 99–188, 259-292 online
- Hayami, Akira; Saito, Osamu; and Toby, Ronald P., eds. The Economic History of Japan, 1600-1990. Vol. 1: Emergence of Economic Society in Japan, 1600-1859. (2004). 420 pp.
- Kelley, Allen C. and Jeffrey G. Williamson, ed. Lessons from Japanese Development (1974)
- Kornicki, Peter F., ed. Meiji Japan: Political, Economic and Social History 1868–1912 (4 vol; 1998) 1336 pages of scholarly articles
- Kozo, Yamamura, and Yasuba Yasukichi, eds. The Political Economy of Japan: Volume 1—The Domestic Transformation (1987)
- Lechevalier, Sébastien, ed. The Great Transformation of Japanese Capitalism (2014) on 1980-2012
- Morikawa, Hidemasa. A History of Top Management in Japan: Managerial Enterprises and Family Enterprises (2001)
- Morley, James William, ed. Japan's foreign policy, 1868-1941: a research guide (Columbia UP, 1974), covers Japan's economic foreign policies, 1868–1893, pp 118–52
- Morris-Suzuki, Tessa. History of Japanese Economic Thought (1991)
- Nakamura, Takafusa, et al. eds. The Economic History of Japan: 1600–1990: Volume 1: Emergence of Economic Society in Japan, 1600–1859 (2004); Volume 3: Economic History of Japan 1914–1955: A Dual Structure (2003),
- Nakamura, James. Agricultural Production and the Economic Development of Japan, 1873–1922 (Princeton University Press, 1966)
- Ohtsu, Makoto. Inside Japanese Business: A Narrative History, 1960-2000. (2002). 459pp.
- Patrick, Hugh, Sooned. Japanese Industrialization and Its Social Consequences (1977)
- Rosovsky, Henry. "Rumbles in the Rice Fields," Journal of Asian Studies (February 1968): vol. 27, No. 2 pp 347–60.
- Smitka, Michael, ed. The Japanese economy in the Tokugawa era, 1600-1868 (Routledge, 2012)
- Sugihara, Kaoru. Japan, China, and the Growth of the Asian International Economy, 1850-1949 - Vol. 1
- Tolliday, Steven. The Economic Development of Modern Japan, 1868–1945: From the Meiji Restoration to the Second World War (2 vol; 2001), 1376pp; reprints 50 scholarly articles
- Yamamura, Kozo. "Toward a Reexamination of the Economic History of Tokugawa Japan, 1600-1867." Journal of Economic History (1973) 33#3 pp: 509–546. in Jstor

== Foreign policy ==
- Akagi, Roy Hidemichi. Japan's Foreign Relations 1542-1936: A Short History (1979) online 560pp
- Beasley, William G. Japanese Imperialism, 1894–1945 (Oxford UP, 1987)
- Burns, Richard Dean, and Edward Moore Bennett. Diplomats in Crisis: United States-Chinese-Japanese Relations, 1919-1941 (ABC-Clio, 1974); bibliography
- Cooney, Kevin J. Japan's Foreign Policy Since 1945 (2006)
- Hook, Glenn D. et al. Japan's International Relations: Politics, Economics and Security (2011)
- Inoguchi, Takashi. Japan's foreign policy in an era of global change (A&C Black, 2013)
- Iriye, Akira. Japan and the wider world: from the mid-nineteenth century to the present (Longman, 1997)
- Jung-Sun, Han. "Rationalizing the Orient: The" East Asia Cooperative Community" in Prewar Japan." Monumenta Nipponica (2005): 481-514. in JSTOR
- Lafeber, Walter. The Clash: A History of U.S.-Japan Relations (1997), a standard scholarly history
- Langdon, Frank. Japan's foreign policy (U. British Columbia Press, 2011)
- Langer, William L. The diplomacy of imperialism: 1890-1902 (2nd ed. 1951), world diplomatic history
- Maslow, Sebastian, Ra Mason and Paul O’Shea, eds. Risk State: Japan’s Foreign Policy In An Age Of Uncertainty (Ashgate. 2015) 202pp excerpt
- Morley, James William, ed. Japan's foreign policy, 1868-1941: a research guide (Columbia UP, 1974), comprehensive coverage of diplomatic & military & cultural relations
- Nish, Ian Hill. The origins of the Russo-Japanese war (1985)
- Nish, Ian. Japanese Foreign Policy, 1869-1942: Kasumigaseki to Miyakezaka (2001)
- Nish, Ian. (1990) "An Overview of Relations between China and Japan, 1895–1945." China Quarterly (1990) 124 (1990): 601–623. online
- Scalapino, Robert A., and Edwin O. Reischauer, eds. The Foreign Policy of Modern Japan (1977)
- Shimamoto, Mayako, Koji Ito, and Yoneyuki Sugita. Historical Dictionary of Japanese Foreign Policy (2015)
- Sun, Youli, and You-Li Sun. China and the Origins of the Pacific War, 1931-1941 (New York: St. Martin's Press, 1993)
- White, John Albert. The Diplomacy of the Russo-Japanese War (Princeton UP, 1964)
- Young, Louise. "Rethinking empire: Lessons from imperial and post-imperial Japan." The Oxford handbook of the ends of empire (2018): 212-230. online

== Military history ==
- Drea, Edward J. Japan's Imperial Army: Its Rise and Fall, 1853 - 1945 (2016) online
- Edgerton, Robert B. Warriors of the Rising Sun: A History of the Japanese Military (1997)
- Farris, William Wayne. Heavenly Warriors: The Evolution of Japan's Military, 500–1300 (Harvard East Asian Monographs) (1996)
- Field, Andrew. Royal Navy Strategy in the Far East, 1919-1939: Preparing for War against Japan (Frank Cass, 2003).
- Friday K. F. "Bushido or Bull? A Medieval Historian's Perspective on the Imperial Army and the Japanese Warrior Tradition," The History Teacher (1994) 27:339–349, in JSTOR
- Harries, M. and S. Harries. Soldiers of the Sun: The Rise and Fall of the Imperial Japanese Army (1991).
- Morley, James William, ed. Japan's foreign policy, 1868-1941: a research guide (Columbia UP, 1974), Covers " Japan's military foreign policies.", pp 3–117
- Nitobe Inazō. Bushido: The Soul of Japan (Rutland, VT: Charles E. Tuttle, 1969)
- Perez, Louis G., ed. Japan at War: An Encyclopedia (Santa Barbara, CA: ABC-Clio, 2013).
- Pike, Francis. Hirohito's War: The Pacific War, 1941-1945 (2016)
- Steinberg, John W., Bruce W. Menning, David Schimmelpenninck Van Der Oye, Shinji Yokote, and David Wolff, eds. The Russo-Japanese War in Global Perspective: World War Zero. Boston: Brill, 2005.
- Turnbull, Stephen (2002). War in Japan: 1467–1615. Oxford: Osprey Publishing.

== Historiography ==
- Allinson, Gary D. The Columbia Guide to Modern Japanese History. (1999). 259 pp.
- Beasley W. G., and E. G. Pulleyblank, eds. Historians of China and Japan. 1961.
- Bix, Herbert P. "Hiroshima in History and Memory: A Symposium, Japan's Delayed Surrender: A Reinterpretation." Diplomatic History 19.2 (1995): 197-225.
- Bix, Herbert P. "ar Responsibilit and Historical Memor: Hirohito's Apparition." Asia-Pacific Journal| Japan Focus 6#5 (2008) 1–18. online
- Cullen, L. M. A History of Japan, 1582–1941: Internal and External Worlds (2003) pp 302–20.
- Hardacre, Helen and Kern, Adam L., eds. New Directions in the Study of Meiji Japan. (1997). 782 pp.
- Hein, Laura, and Akiko Takenaka. "Exhibiting World War II in Japan and the United States since 1995." Pacific Historical Review 76.1 (2007): 61-94.
- Tanaka, Stefan. Japan's Orient: Rendering Pasts into History (1995), How Japanese historians created the equivalent of an "Orient" and built a new national historiography.
- Wray, Harry, and Hilary Conroy, eds. Japan Examined: Perspectives on Modern Japanese History (1983), historiography

=== Scholarly journals ===
- East Asian History
- Journal of Japanese Studies
- Korean Studies
- Monumenta Nipponica, Japanese studies (in English)
- Sino-Japanese Studies
- Social Science Japan Journal

=== Primary sources ===
- Chamberlain, Basil Hall and W. B. Mason (1891). A handbook for travellers in Japan. London: J. Murray. full text of useful travel guide
- Cook, Haruko Taya and Cook, Theodore F. eds. Japan at War: An Oral History. (1992). 504 pp., World War II homefront
- De Bary, Wm Theodore, et al eds. Sources of Japanese tradition: 1600 to 2000 (2 vol; Columbia University Press, 2005). vol 1 to 1600 online; vol 1-2 1958 edition
- Lu, David J. Japan: A Documentary History: V. 1: The Dawn of History to the Late Eighteenth Century (Routledge, 2015); Japan: A Documentary History: V. 2: The Late Tokugawa Period to the Present (Routledge, 2015)
- Huffman, James L. ed. Modern Japan: A History in Documents (New York: Oxford University Press, 2004).
- Tsunoda, Ryusaku, W. T. de Bary, and Donald Keene, eds. Sources of Japanese Tradition. 1958. online free to borrow
- Yoshida, Shigeru. The Yoshida Memoirs: The Story of Japan in Crisis 1961, on Occupation, 1945–51
