= Mary Patterson Elkinton Nitobe =

American-Quaker (1857-1938)

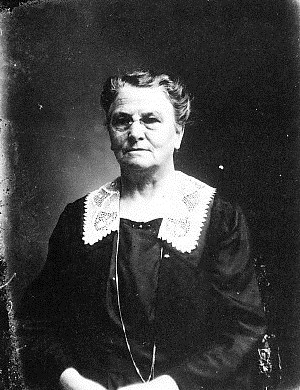
Mary Nitobe

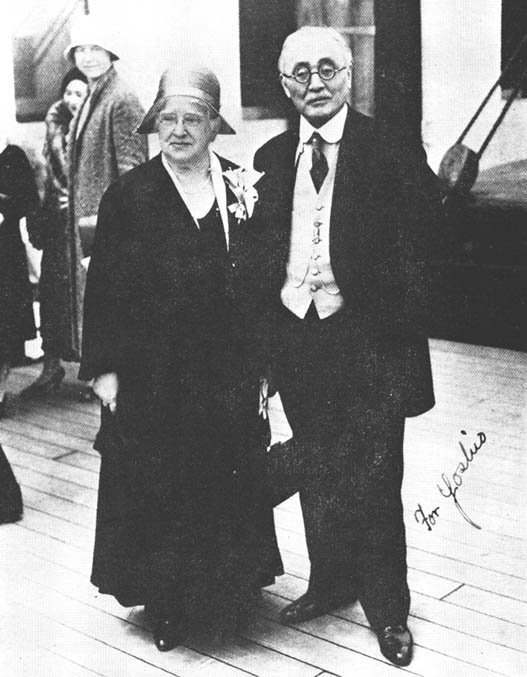
With husband Nitobe Inazo (1932)

Mary Patterson Elkinton Nitobe (August 14, 1857 - September 22, 1938) was an American Quaker and the wife of the Japanese economist Nitobe Inazō.

== Life ==
Mary Patterson Elkinton was born in 1857 to a prominent Quaker family in Philadelphia. She met Nitobe Inazō in Baltimore, and against the wishes of both their families, married him in 1891. Their only child died in infancy, but they adopted Nitobe's nephew, Yoshio, and a female relative Kotoko.

Living in Japan, which she considered her home, she contributed to educational reform, worked to improve US-Japan relations, advocated internationalism and helped to establish several schools. She helped her husband in the writing of his 1899 book, Bushidô, The Soul of Japan. When her husband served in the League of Nations at Geneva she was active in international circles. After they returned to Tokyo in the late 1920s, she found Japanese militarism in conflict with her Quakerism.

After her husband's death, she edited his reminiscences, and continued to live in Japan. She died on 22 September 1938.

Papers of both Mary and Inzo Nitobe are held at Swarthmore College.

== Works ==
- (ed. with introduction and comments) Reminiscences of childhood in the early days of modern Japan by Nitobe Inazō, 1934
