= Ōta Tokitoshi =

Samurai of the late Edo period

Ōta Tokitoshi (太田 時敏, 16 January 1839 – 20 January 1915) was a samurai of Morioka and a Sanbongi Shinden Goyogakari (new rice field affairs official in Sanbongi) of the late Edo period. He was Nitobe Inazō's uncle. He was named Renhachiro (練八郎) in his youth.

== Life ==
Ōta Tokitoshi was born on January 16, 1839. His father was Tsutō (傳), a chief retainer of Shichinohe Domain. His paternal grandfather was Koretami (維民), atactician. He was adopted by Ota Kingoro (太田金五郎), a chief retainer of Morioka Domain. In 1863, he was appointed Sanbongi Shinden Goyogakari (new rice field affairs official in Sanbongi). In 1868, he participated in the Boshin War as the shogunate side. After that, he adopted Nitobe Inazō. He managed a clothing store called “Tokitoshido（時敏堂）” in Tokyo. Inazō used his uncle Tokitoshi as a model for his book “Bushidō”, and the book's door had a dedication from Inazō to Tokitoshi. He also served as the Metropolitan Police Department.He also served as the decree for the Nanbu (南部) family. On January 18, 1915, he became ill and some came to visit him. He died on January 20, 1915.

== Family ==
Depending upon the source, Ōta Tokitoshi and the entire Nitobe clan are descendants of either the Minamoto clan or the Taira clan (specifically, Chiba Tsunetane's branch). Tsunetane's grandson, Tsunehide (常秀, Tsunetane's son Tanemasa(胤正)'s son) took over Nitobe in Shimotsuke Province. Tsunehide continued inheritance with Tsunechika (常親), Yasutane (泰胤), Tsunesato (常邑), Tsunesada (常貞)、Sadatsuna (貞綱), Sadahiro (貞広), Hiromori (広盛), Tsunemochi (常望) Tsunetada (常忠), Tsunenobu (常信), and Nobumori (信盛) from generation to generation. Sadatsuna lived in Nitobe and died in 1309. During the Nanboku-chō period, Sadahiro and his son Hiromori both fought on the Southern Court side. Sadahiro died in 1337. Hiromori died in Shinano in 1351 during the war. Tsunetada and his son Tsunenobu both served Ashikaga Mitsukane and Mochiuji of the Kantō kubō. After Tsunenobu's death, his son Nobumori returned to Nitobe. Nobumori's daughter was Moriyori(盛頼)'s wife. As for the inheritor, Nobumori welcomed the clan, Motoyoshi Narizumi(元良成澄)'s child, Moriyori (盛頼) as an adopted child, and became Nitobe for the first time. Moriyori continued inheritance with Yoritane (頼胤), Yoshitane (良胤), Tanemochi (胤望), Yorinaga (頼長), Taneshige (胤重), and Tokiharu (春治) from generation to generation. Tokiharu's third son Tsunetsuna (常綱, popular name was Densuke(伝助)) split up and became a Hanamaki Kyūjin (upper class retainers). Before Tsunetsuna became Kyūjin, Tsunetsuna served Nanbu Masanao. After Tsunetsuna's death, Tsunetsuna's second son Sadaaki (貞紹, popular name was Denzō(伝蔵)) inherited. After Sadaaki, Yoshiaki (義紹, popular names were Kyūsuke(九助), Densuke(伝助), and Heizo(平蔵)) inherited. After Yoshiaki's death, Yoshiaki's nephew (Yoshiaki's brother Tsunekatsu(常佸)'s son) Tsunemochi (常以) inherited. After Tsunemochi's death, Tsunemochi's brother Tsunetoki (常言, popular name was Denzō(伝蔵)) inherited. After Tsunetoki, Tsuneyoshi (常贇, popular name was Densuke(伝助)) inherited. Tsuneyoshi was Tokitoshi's Great-grandfather. Tsuneyoshi married Tokitoshi's great-grandmother Oei (おゑい, daughter of Ōta Hidenori (太田秀典) of Hanamaki). Tsuneyoshi Died in 1803. Tokitoshi's grandfather was Koretami (維民, Inheritance to the reign of Nanbu Toshitaka.) Tokitoshi's father was Tsunezumi (常澄, Nitobe Tsutō). Tokitoshi's brother was Tsunenori (常訓, Jūjirō), and Tokitoshi's nephew were Shichirō (七郎) and Inanosuke (稲之助, Inazō).
