= Nitobe Jūjirō =

Nineteenth century samurai

Nitobe Jūjirō (新渡戸 十次郎, 1820–1868) was a Japanese samurai and retainer of the Morioka Domain in the late Edo period. His father was Nitobe Tsutō. He was the father of educator and diplomat Nitobe Inazō and Nitobe Shichirō.

== Life ==
Nitobe was born in Hanamaki on July 20, 1820. His father was Tsutō (傳). His posthumous name was Tsunenori (常訓). When Jūjirō was just born, Jūjirō's grandfather Koretami bought the anger of the Morioka Domain and Koretami was exiled to Tanabe.

In 1857, Jūjirō was appointed Sanbongi Shinden Goyogakari (new rice field affairs official in Sanbongi). He worked with his father to cultivate and successfully got water to flow into the irrigation canal called the Ina River. In 1860, he planned a new town called Inaoi-chō (now part of Towada) using a four-way grid pattern, divided into 12 neighborhoods. This was the forerunner to modern city planning in Japan.

He died on January 18, 1868. His death was mourned by his father, his family, and the townspeople.

== Family ==
Depending upon the source, Nitobe Jūjirō and the entire Nitobe clan are descendants of either the Minamoto clan or the Taira clan (specifically, Chiba Tsunetane's branch). Tsunetane's grandson, Tsunehide (常秀, Tsunetane's son Tanemasa(胤正)'s son) took over Nitobe in Shimotsuke Province. Tsunehide continued inheritance with Tsunechika (常親), Yasutane (泰胤), Tsunesato (常邑), Tsunesada (常貞)、Sadatsuna (貞綱), Sadahiro (貞広), Hiromori (広盛), Tsunemochi (常望) Tsunetada (常忠), Tsunenobu (常信), and Nobumori (信盛) from generation to generation. Sadatsuna lived in Nitobe and died in 1309.

During the Nanboku-chō period, Sadahiro and his son Hiromori both fought on the Southern Court side. Sadahiro died in 1337. Hiromori died in Shinano in 1351 during the war. Tsunetada and his son Tsunenobu both served Ashikaga Mitsukane and Mochiuji of the Kantō kubō. After Tsunenobu's death, his son Nobumori returned to Nitobe. Nobumori's daughter was Moriyori (盛頼)'s wife. As for the inheritor, Nobumori welcomed the clan, Motoyoshi Narizumi (元良成澄)'s child, Moriyori (盛頼) as an adopted child, and became Nitobe for the first time. Moriyori continued inheritance with Yoritane (頼胤), Yoshitane (良胤), Tanemochi (胤望), Yorinaga (頼長), Taneshige (胤重), and Tokiharu (春治) from generation to generation. Tokiharu's third son Tsunetsuna (常綱, popular name was Densuke(伝助)) split up and became a Hanamaki Kyūjin (upper class retainer). Before Tsunetsuna became Kyūjin, Tsunetsuna served Nanbu Masanao. After Tsunetsuna's death, Tsunetsuna's second son Sadaaki (貞紹, popular name was Denzō(伝蔵)) inherited. After Sadaaki, Yoshiaki (義紹, popular names were Kyūsuke (九助), Densuke (伝助), and Heizo (平蔵)) inherited. After Yoshiaki's death, Yoshiaki's nephew (Yoshiaki's brother Tsunekatsu(常佸)'s son) Tsunemochi (常以) inherited. After Tsunemochi's death, Tsunemochi's brother Tsunetoki (常言, popular name was Denzō (伝蔵)) inherited. After Tsunetoki, Tsuneyoshi (常贇, popular name was Densuke (伝助)) inherited.

Tsuneyoshi was Jūjirō's great-grandfather. Tsuneyoshi married Jūjirō's great-grandmother Oei (おゑい, daughter of Ōta Hidenori (太田秀典) of Hanamaki). Tsuneyoshi Died in 1803. Jūjirō's grandfather was Koretami (維民, heir to the reign of Nanbu Toshitaka.) Jūjirō's father was Tsunezumi (常澄, Nitobe Tsutō). Jūjirō's brother was Ōta Tokitoshi), and Jūjirō's sons were Shichirō (七郎) and Inanosuke (稲之助, Inazō).
