= Nitobe Tsutō =

Japanese samurai and scholar (1793–1871)

Nitobe Tsutō (新渡戸 傳, 1793 – 1871) was a Japanese samurai, martial arts scholar and retainer of the Morioka Domain in the late Edo period.

== Life ==
Nitobe Tsutō was born on December 9, 1793, at Hanamaki Castle. He was also called Nueta (縫太). His father was Nitobe Koretami (維民). His posthumous name was Tsunezumi (常澄). His Go (pen name) was Taiso (太素).

Nanbu Toshitaka's reforms included the abolition of death penalty, and even those who committed serious crimes were imprisoned. As a result, there were significant violence and frequent complaints from the people. One day he met a castle keeper. At that time, he told this castle keeper that he was ready to go on a business trip at any time, and listened loudly where thousands of peasants were in trouble. There was no prospect of being told, and when he continued to push up even if he talked about one thing, he told his opinion that if he cut off two people who moved forward, only a few people would be dispatched. He was never ordered to travel, perhaps because his opinion did not fit the reform plan of the then daimyō Nanbu Toshitaka. After Toshitaka's death in 1820, his father thought it was time and filed a white paper with the Morioka clan, along with several samurais, including Tsutō. However, the white paper was not accepted, and his father was taken up on a semi-land and expelled to Tanabu(now part of the city of Mutsu). When his father was exiled from Morioka Domain, Tsutō also lived with his father. At that time, he decided to make a living as a merchant, went to Morioka to learn commerce, went back to his father's home and started commerce, and went up to Edo at the request of a timber dealer. In 1852, he applied to Morioka Domain for the development of a new rice field in Sanbongi. In 1855, he was appointed Sanbongi Shinden Goyogakari (new rice field affairs official in Sanbongi). In 1869, he assumed the post of Daisanji (second to a governor) of the Shichinohe Domain. He died on November 9, 1871.

== Family ==
Depending upon the source, Nitobe Tsutō and the entire Nitobe clan are descendants of either the Minamoto clan or the Taira clan (specifically, Chiba Tsunetane's branch). Tsunetane's grandson, Tsunehide (常秀, Tsunetane's son Tanemasa(胤正)'s son) took over Nitobe in Shimotsuke Province. Tsunehide continued inheritance with Tsunechika (常親), Yasutane (泰胤), Tsunesato (常邑), Tsunesada (常貞)、Sadatsuna (貞綱), Sadahiro (貞広), Hiromori (広盛), Tsunemochi (常望) Tsunetada (常忠), Tsunenobu (常信), and Nobumori (信盛) from generation to generation. Sadatsuna lived in Nitobe and died in 1309. During the Nanboku-chō period, Sadahiro and his son Hiromori both fought on the Southern Court side. Sadahiro died in 1337. Hiromori died in Shinano in 1351 during the war. Tsunetada and his son Tsunenobu both served Ashikaga Mitsukane and Mochiuji of the Kantō kubō. After Tsunenobu's death, his son Nobumori returned to Nitobe. Nobumori's daughter was Moriyori(盛頼)'s wife. As for the inheritor, Nobumori welcomed the clan, Motoyoshi Narizumi(元良成澄)'s child, Moriyori (盛頼) as an adopted child, and became Nitobe for the first time. Moriyori continued inheritance with Yoritane (頼胤), Yoshitane (良胤), Tanemochi (胤望), Yorinaga (頼長), Taneshige (胤重), and Tokiharu (春治) from generation to generation. Tokiharu's third son Tsunetsuna (常綱, popular name was Densuke(伝助)) split up and became a Hanamaki Kyūjin (upper class retainers). Before Tsunetsuna became Kyūjin, Tsunetsuna served Nanbu Masanao. After Tsunetsuna's death, Tsunetsuna's second son Sadaaki (貞紹, popular name was Denzō(伝蔵)) inherited. After Sadaaki, Yoshiaki (義紹, popular names were Kyūsuke(九助), Densuke(伝助), and Heizo(平蔵)) inherited. After Yoshiaki's death, Yoshiaki's nephew (Yoshiaki's brother Tsunekatsu(常佸)'s son) Tsunemochi (常以) inherited. After Tsunemochi's death, Tsunemochi's brother Tsunetoki (常言, popular name was Denzō(伝蔵)) inherited. After Tsunetoki, Tsuneyoshi (常贇, popular name was Densuke(伝助)) inherited. Tsuneyoshi was Tsutō's grandfather. Tsuneyoshi married Tsutō's grandmother Oei (おゑい, daughter of Ōta Hidenori (太田秀典) of Hanamaki). Tsuneyoshi Died in 1803. Tsutō's father was Koretami (維民, Inheritance to the reign of Nanbu Toshitaka.). Nitobe Tsutō's sons were Tsunenori (常訓, Jūjirō) and Ōta Tokitoshi. Tsutō's grandsons were Shichirō (七郎) and Inanosuke (稲之助, Inazō).
