= Nitobe Koretami =

Samurai and martial arts scholar

Nitobe Koretami (新渡戸 維民, 1769 – 1845) was a Japanese samurai, martial arts scholar and retainer of the Morioka Domain during the late Edo period.

== Life ==
Nitobe Koretami was born in 1769. He was called Eikichi (栄吉) in his childhood. After he attained adulthood, he was also called Minji (民司) and Heiroku (平六). He was called Denzō (伝蔵) in his second half of life and later called Chiō (痴翁). His father was Nitobe Tsuneyoshi (常贇), and his mother was Oei (おゑい), the daughter of Ōta Hidenori (太田秀典) of Hanamaki. When his parents married, the Nitobe family received about 11 koku. And when his sister married, the Nitobe family gave her husband's family a substantial dowry. However, during his life, the family had ups and downs. He studied under Kenshin's martial arts instructor, Urushido Yoshimasa (漆戸至昌). He bestowed that martial arts training to Tochinai Takayoshi (栃内逢吉).

Around the beginning of the 19th century, the security of Hanamaki Castle became weak due to Nanbu Toshitaka's sovereign reforms due to financial difficulties, so he secretly agreed with several warriors and raised funds for Hanamaki Castle security. After Toshitaka's death in 1820, he thought it was time and filed a white paper with the Morioka clan, along with several samurai, including his son Nueta (縫太, Nitobe Tsutō). However, the white paper was not accepted, and he was taken up on a semi-land and expelled to Tanabu(now part of the city of Mutsu). He was forgiven in 1826 and returned to Hanamaki. He served a secret official business at Morioka Domain. He was recognized for his work and he was involved in the governing of Morioka. He also worked as a writer and he died on October 7, 1845.

== Family ==
Depending upon the source, Ōta Tokitoshi and the entire Nitobe clan are descendants of either the Minamoto clan or the Taira clan (specifically, Chiba Tsunetane's branch).

Tsunetane's grandson, Tsunehide (常秀, Tsunetane's son Tanemasa(胤正)'s son) took over Nitobe in Shimotsuke Province. Tsunehide continued inheritance with Tsunechika (常親), Yasutane (泰胤), Tsunesato (常邑), Tsunesada (常貞)、Sadatsuna (貞綱), Sadahiro (貞広), Hiromori (広盛), Tsunemochi (常望) Tsunetada (常忠), Tsunenobu (常信), and Nobumori (信盛) from generation to generation. Sadatsuna lived in Nitobe and died in 1309. During the Nanboku-chō period, Sadahiro and his son Hiromori both fought for the Southern Court. Sadahiro died in 1337. Hiromori died in Shinano in 1351 during the war. Tsunetada and his son Tsunenobu both served Ashikaga Mitsukane and Mochiuji of the Kantō kubō. After Tsunenobu's death, his son Nobumori returned to Nitobe. Nobumori's daughter was Moriyori's (盛頼) wife. As for the inheritor, Nobumori welcomed the clan, Motoyoshi Narizumi(元良成澄)'s child, Moriyori (盛頼) as an adopted child, and became Nitobe for the first time. Moriyori continued inheritance with Yoritane (頼胤), Yoshitane (良胤), Tanemochi (胤望), Yorinaga (頼長), Taneshige (胤重), and Tokiharu (春治) from generation to generation. Tokiharu's third son Tsunetsuna (常綱, popular name was Densuke(伝助)) split up and became a Hanamaki Kyūjin (upper class retainers). Before Tsunetsuna became Kyūjin, Tsunetsuna served Nanbu Masanao. After Tsunetsuna's death, Tsunetsuna's second son Sadaaki (貞紹, popular name was Denzō (伝蔵)) inheritedhis position. After Sadaaki, Yoshiaki (義紹, popular names were Kyūsuke(九助), Densuke (伝助), and Heizo (平蔵)) succeeded him. After Yoshiaki's death, Yoshiaki's nephew (Yoshiaki's brother Tsunekatsu(常佸)'s son) Tsunemochi (常以) succeeded him. After Tsunemochi's death, Tsunemochi's brother Tsunetoki (常言, popular name was Denzō (伝蔵)) succeeded him. After Tsunetoki, Tsuneyoshi (常贇, popular name was Densuke (伝助)) succeeded him. Tsuneyoshi was Koretami's father. Tsuneyoshi married Koretami's mother Oei (おゑい, daughter of Ōta Hidenori (太田秀典) of Hanamaki). Tsuneyoshi died in 1803. Koretami's son was Tsunezumi (常澄, Nitobe Tsutō). Koretami's grandson was Tsunenori (常訓, Jūjirō) and Ōta Tokitoshi. Koretami's great-grandsons were Shichirō (七郎) and Inanosuke (稲之助, Inazō).
