= Nitobe Bunka College =

Private junior college in Nakano, Tokyo, Japan

Coordinates: 35.696433°N 139.661910°E

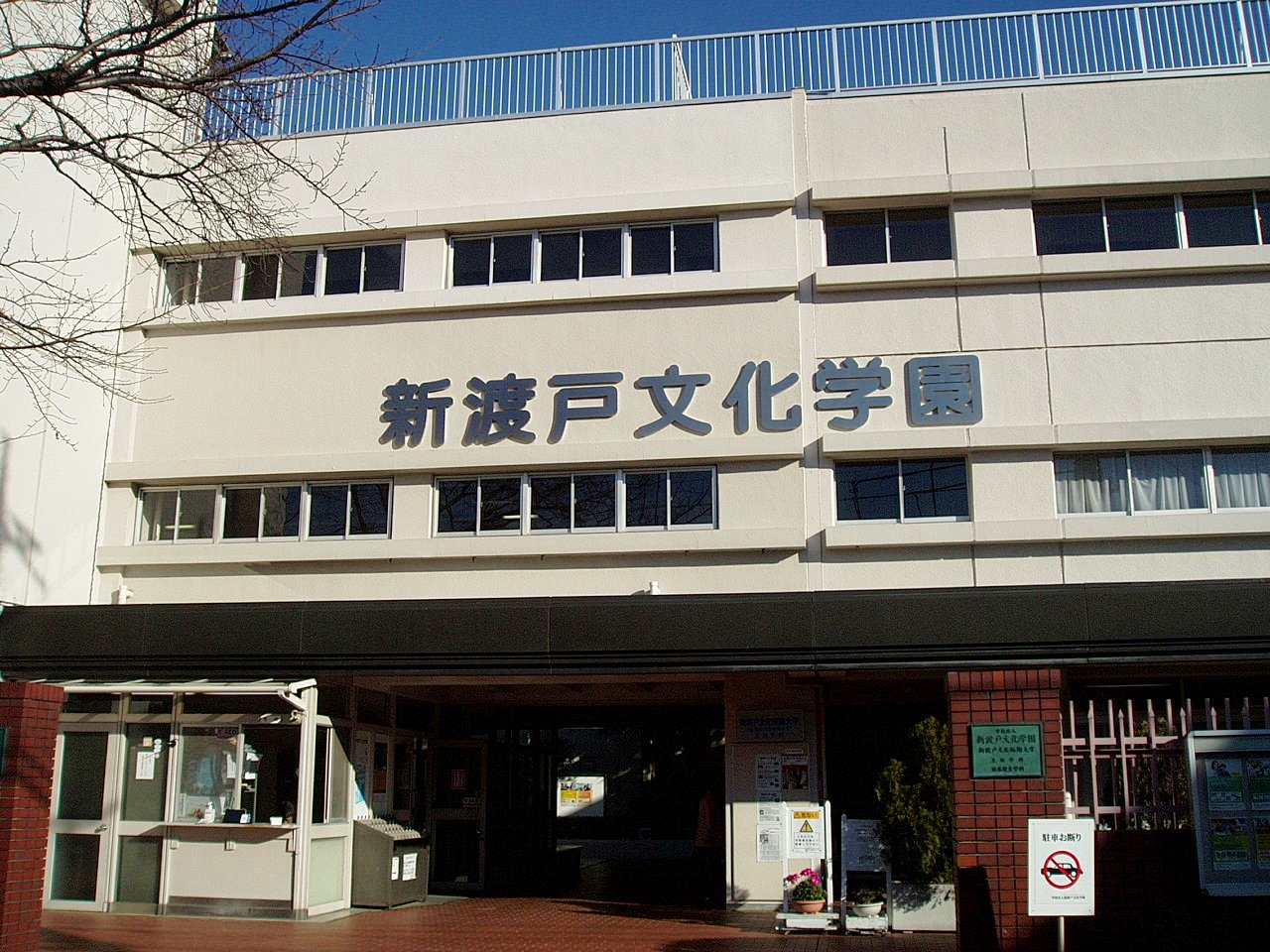
Main gate

Tokyo Bunka Junior College (東京文化短期大学, Tōkyō bunka tanki daigaku) is a private junior college in Nakano, Tokyo, Japan. The precursor of the school was founded in 1927, and it was chartered as a junior college in 1950.

In 2010 the college was renamed Nitobe Bunka College (新渡戸文化短期大学, Nitobe bunka tanki daigaku) after its first president Inazo Nitobe (presidency: 1928–1933).
