= An Ecological View of History =

1957 essay by Tadao Umesao

An Ecological View of History: Japanese Civilization in the World Context (文明の生態史観, Bunmei no Seitai Shikan) is an essay by Tadao Umesao published in 1957 (Showa 32) in Chūō Kōron. Along with Techniques of Intellectual Production (知的生産の技術), it is one of Umesao's representative works. A series edition was published by Chūō Kōronsha in 1967 (Showa 42), a paperback edition was published by Chūō Kōron Bunko in 1974 (Showa 49), and a revised edition by the same bunko in 1998 (Heisei 10). It was also included in Collected Works of Tadao Umesao (Vol. 5) in 1989 (Heisei 1) and in Chūō Kōron Classics in 2002 (Heisei 14).

== Overview ==
This work systematizes Umesao's impressions during his research trip to Afghanistan, India, and Pakistan in 1955 (Showa 30), presenting a new perspective on civilization. The first half narrates the trip, describing the cultural characteristics he sensed there, differences from Japan, and the values of each culture. The latter half denies the conventional division of the world into the framework of "West and East," and instead explains civilization by dividing the world into the First Region and the Second Region.

According to this theory, Western Europe and Japan belong to the First Region, while the vast continental areas between them are classified as the Second Region. In the Second Region, large empires arose early on, but they had problems in their institutions and eventually declined. Conversely, the First Region, located on the periphery, has a stable environment with mild climate and less vulnerability to external attacks. Although development there was slower than in the Second Region, it progressed by importing culture from the Second Region, forming a stable and advanced society. At the time, this theory attracted great attention and has been highly regarded for over half a century. When published as part of the Chūō Kōron series in 1967, Saikyo Komatsu wrote a recommendation. When published in the 1974 Chūō Kōron Bunko edition, Yasushi Tani wrote the commentary. The 2002 Chūō Kōron Classics edition includes a commentary by Takashi Shiraishi.

== Contents ==
=== Considerations Based on Field Research ===
The first half presents the author's reflections based on field research. Primarily drawing from his experiences in India, Afghanistan, and Pakistan, the author felt directly that there is a fundamental difference between the factors that allowed Japan to modernize rapidly and those that prevented other Asian countries from doing so. He came to believe that Japan is essentially a special country. The next chapter considers the origin of this difference based on ecology.

=== An Ecological View of History ===
Geographically, Japan belongs to Asia, but considering Japan's civilization (here meaning the level of advancement in economy, living standards, etc.), it is a uniquely advanced civilization that cannot be contained within the concept of the East.

Therefore, the author proposes a new perspective. Based on the degree of civilization development, the world is divided into two major regions called the First Region and the Second Region. The First Region comprises a few countries of Western Europe and Japan—highly developed civilized states—while the entire Eurasian continent aside from these belongs to the Second Region. The author considers that there may be laws governing social change and development. He borrows the ecological term "succession" (遷移, succession in biology) for this. Succession theory is a kind of law of development, and by applying it to humans, the author tries to grasp some laws of human development. Accordingly, this theory does not assume a single type of development such as socialism, but holds that succession occurs through changes in the environment and in the society itself, allowing for different development depending on the region.

==== Characteristics of the First Region ====
The First Region was a periphery to the ancient civilizations and empires of the Second Region. The First Region absorbed culture from the Second Region and began to form states. Feudalism was established in the First Region. Also, because the First Region was located on the periphery, it was not threatened by desert nomads as the Second Region was (this will be described later). These favorable conditions caused autogenic succession (internal transformation within civilization). In other words, the fact that the First Region developed feudalism that nurtured the bourgeoisie and then transitioned to capitalism is a manifestation of this. Examples include phenomena such as the Reformation, the establishment of popular religions in the Middle Ages, the emergence of citizens, the formation of guilds, the development of free cities, overseas trade, and peasant wars. There are many similarities after modernization as well, such as the fascist governments in Japan and Germany, their delayed participation in colonial competitions, and rapid postwar development. Furthermore, not only Japan and Germany, but all First Region countries are capitalist states that engaged in colonial contests in the past.

==== Characteristics of the Second Region ====
In the Second Region, ancient civilizations developed and large, powerful empires were established. These empires repeatedly rose and fell. Examples include the numerous Chinese empires and Islamic empires. There are many similarities among the despotic empires there: magnificent courts, vast territories, complex ethnic relations, border regions, and the presence of satellite states.

Also, within the Second Region are arid zones where nomadic tribes with strong military power emerged, who often attacked civilizations and empires. Because politics was constantly threatened by these forces, highly advanced political systems could not be established. Due to the constant presence of strong external forces, allogenic succession (development due to external influences) occurs in the Second Region. Therefore, the Second Region did not develop a bourgeoisie under despotic politics, and the foundation for capitalist society was not formed. Consequently, during the world wars, these regions could not maintain great military power and ended up as colonies. Postwar periods in the Second Region have been marked by frequent independence movements, revolutions, and civil wars. This is in stark contrast to the First Region, where none of these phenomena occurred.

==== Summary ====
Both the First and Second Regions share certain commonalities and follow similar developmental processes based on these commonalities. Thus, viewing the world strictly as West versus East is of limited use today; it is more appropriate to see it as the First Region and Second Region.

The principle of the ecological view of history holds that due to desert storms, civilizations collapse and must restart succession. This principle corresponds to Nishinishi Kinji's ecological succession theory (where transitions reset after events like wildfires or river floods). The ecological view of history represents Umesao's synchronic theory, while the theory of information civilization is the diachronic counterpart. The ecological environment has been replaced by institutional and apparatus systems in the information civilization.

While the desert storms are central, the influence of the sea is also emphasized. Additionally, Umesao proposed the "religious virus" theory and concretely discussed the succession of civilization elements.

== Responses ==
When the ecological view of history was published, it caused a major reaction. From the 1990s onward, numerous studies applying and developing the theory from other perspectives were published by Chūō Kōronsha as "Views of Civilization," including Heita Kawakatsu's An Oceanic View of Civilization, Yoshinori Yasuda's An Environmental View of Civilization, Taisuke Murakami's A Multi-System View of Civilization, and Masanori Moriya's A Technological View of Civilization.

On the other hand, there have been many criticisms of the ecological view. Although Umesao himself stated that the development of the First Region was the result of autogenic succession (self-generated development), critics argued that this development was not truly self-generated—for example, Japan's modernization can be seen as a response to pressure from Western powers during the Meiji Restoration. The regional division has also been criticized as overly coarse; America was not mentioned, and Southeast Asia was included in the Second Region, although it often does not fit the characteristics of the Second Region described above, leading to arguments that it should be considered a separate, independent region. Heita Kawakatsu's An Oceanic View of Civilization points out that the ecological view neglects the existence of the sea and proposed a developed view including maritime exchanges.

These debates illustrate the significant impact of the ecological view of history. However, the ecological view of history also includes descriptions of similarities of civilizations based on maritime forms and many studies by Umesao and his group concerning the sea and civilization.

== Discussions abroad ==
In May 2019, An Ecological View of History was published in Taiwan under the title "The Development of Modern Japanese Civilization and the Ecological View of History" by Yuanzu Culture Publishing. When viewed through the lens of the ecological view of history, Taiwan is positioned at the midpoint among Old World Civilization (China), advanced capitalism (Japan), and multinationalism (Southeast Asia), nurturing Taiwan into an open, adventurous, and active country. It is argued in Taiwan that new business models, new products, and new cultures, which no one had done before, were born in this context. Chen Yongfeng, translator of the Chinese version of the ecological view of history and professor at Tunghai University in Taiwan, states that there is much to learn from the ecological view of history for Taiwan's future diplomacy and politics.

Pekka Korhonen has discussed Asia from the perspectives of various regions based on the ecological view of history.

== 21st-century interpretations ==
With the rise of China, the ecological view of history has once again attracted attention. Umesao stated, "Do not think anymore about reaching into the continent westward; rather, it is better to consider a union of countries along the same longitude from Japan to Australia in the western Pacific. This is the path for the Japanese people to live and a future vision for the 21st century and beyond." This has been highlighted in the NIDS commentary. This idea connects to the contemporary Free and Open Indo-Pacific.

Additionally, the ecological view of history interpretation has been cited by Haiying Yang to explain why democracy has not emerged from Chinese civilization and why democratization in China is difficult.

Makoto Mogi explains in his YouTube videos and writings, referencing geopolitics, the ecological view of history, and Karl Wittfogel's theory of Oriental despotism, why democratization in China is challenging.

Ryota Fukushima, in his book Hello Eurasia: Political Thought in the 21st Century "Chinese" Sphere, interprets the conflict between Taiwan and Hong Kong as part of the "First Region" and China as the "Second Region" based on the ecological view of history, seeing this conflict reflected in movements such as the 2019-2020 Hong Kong democracy protests. He called Hong Kong's struggle against China the "ghost of the Qing Empire".

== Japan's uniqueness and international cooperation ==
An Ecological View of History is as well known in Japan as Samuel P. Huntington's Clash of Civilizations as a theory of civilization.

According to An Ecological View of History proposed by ethnologist Tadao Umesao, Japan geographically belongs to Asia but essentially is part of the "First Region," which is similar to Western Europe. This region is characterized by a temperate climate and a favorable environment that allowed autonomous social development, transitioning through feudal systems to advanced capitalism. Umesao explicitly stated that Japan is "not Asia," and he interpreted Fukuzawa Yukichi's idea of "Datsu-A Nyū-Ō" (leaving Asia and joining Europe) as unnecessary because Japan has fundamentally always been different from the rest of Asia.

On the other hand, international relations scholar Samuel P. Huntington categorized Japanese civilization as distinct from the Confucian civilization of East Asia, including China, in his Clash of Civilizations. This positions Japan as a unique civilization within the broader Asian cultural sphere in international affairs.

Furthermore, historian Heita Kawakatsu, who proposed a maritime view of civilization, emphasized Japan's characteristics as a maritime nation and included it as part of "Maritime Asia." Building on this, Umesao proposed the concept of a "West Pacific Union of Countries along the Same Longitude," advocating for Japan's strategic cooperation with Pacific island nations, Australia, and New Zealand rather than deeper involvement in the Asian continental mainland.

Thus, from the perspective of the ecological view of civilization, Japan's historical experiences and geopolitical characteristics form the foundation of its unique civilizational identity and guide its security and diplomatic policies,

== Bibliography ==
- Umesao Tadao (February 1957). "An Introduction to the Ecological View of Civilization". Chuo Koron. 72 (2). Chuo Koronsha: 32–49. ISSN 0529-6838.
  - Umesao Tadao (October 1964). "An Introduction to the Ecological View of Civilization (Originally in "Chuo Koron" Feb 1957)". Chuo Koron. 79 (10). Chuo Koronsha: 340–358. ISSN 0529-6838. Reprint
  - Modern Japanese Thought. Postwar Japanese Thought Series 15. Chikuma Shobo. 1974. – Includes "An Introduction to the Ecological View of Civilization."
- Umesao Tadao (1967-01-20). The Ecological View of Civilization. Chuko Sosho. Chuo Koronsha. ISBN 978-4-12-000334-9. Archived from the original on 2012-02-18.
  - The Ecological View of Civilization. Chuko Bunko. Yasushi Tani Commentary. Chuo Koronsha. 1974-09-10. ISBN 978-4-12-200135-0.
  - The Ecological View of Civilization. Yasushi Tani Commentary (Revised ed.). Chuko Bunko. 1998-01-18. ISBN 4-12-203037-4.
  - The Ecological View of Civilization, etc. Chuko Classics. Takashi Shiraishi Commentary. Chuo Koron Shinsha. 2002-11-10. ISBN 4-12-160041-X. – Includes "The Formation and Development of Modern Japanese Civilization."
  - "The Ecological View of Civilization Expanded Revised Edition", Yasushi Tani Commentary, Chuko Bunko, October 2023 – Expanded with "The Sea and Japanese Civilization" (2000).
- Shigeharu Sugita, ed. (1989-10-20). Collected Works of Umesao Tadao Vol.5 Comparative Civilization Studies: The Ecological View of Civilization / Development of Comparative Civilization Theory / Issues and Prospects of Civilization Studies. Chuo Koronsha. ISBN 978-4-12-402855-3.

=== Translations ===
- Umesao, Tadao (1983), Japan in the Planetary Era, Japanese Library (in French), Translated and introduced by René Sieffert, Paris: Publications Orientalistes de France - POF, ISBN 978-2716901819 – French translation of "The Ecological View of Civilization" and "Japan in the Age of the Earth."
- Umesao, Tadao (1984), Japan in the Planetary Era (Italian edition) (in Italian), Milano: Spirali Edizioni, ASIN B00FG604MM – Italian translation of "The Ecological View of Civilization," retranslated from the French version (1983).
- Umesao Tadao (1988), The Ecological View of Civilization – Selected Works of Umesao Tadao, World Wise Classics Translation Series, Owl Library, First Volume (in Chinese), translated by Wang Zijing, Shanghai: Sanlian Bookstore Shanghai Branch – Chinese translation of "The Ecological View of Civilization."
- Umesao, Tadao (1986), "Japan as viewed from an eco-historical perspective", Review of Japanese Culture and Society, 1 (1), Center for Inter-cultural Studies and Education, Josai University: 25–31 – English translation of the paper "Japan from an Ecological View."
- Umesao, Tadao; Zahl, Karl F (1988), "Prolegomena to a Historical Consideration of Civilized Living Forms", Japan Without Myth: Ten Critical Essays from Japanese Pens 1946-1963 (in German), Munich: Indicium Verlag, pp. 206–238, ISBN 978-3-89129-423-9 – German translation of the paper "The Ecological View of Civilization."
- Umesao, Tadao (1995), "Introduction to an Ecological View of Civilization", Japan Echo, 22 (special issue), Tokyo: 42–50, ISSN 0388-0435 – English translation of the paper "The Ecological View of Civilization."
- Umesao, Tadao (1995), "Pour une vision écologique de la civilisation", Cahiers du Japon (in French), special issue, Tokyo: Japan Echo: 44–52, ISSN 0388-113X – French translation of the paper "The Ecological View of Civilization."
