= Gilbert Rozman =

American orientalist and sociologist

Gilbert Friedell Rozman (born 18 February 1943) is an American sociologist specializing in Asian studies.

Rozman completed an undergraduate degree in Chinese and Russian studies at Carleton College, and earned a doctorate in sociology at Princeton University. He was a Princeton faculty member between 1970 and 2013, where he taught as Musgrave Professor of Sociology.

== Selected publications ==
- Rozman, Gilbert (1971). Urban Networks in Russia 1750–1800 and Premodern Periodization. Princeton University Press.
- Rozman, Gilbert (1973). Urban Networks in Ch'ing China and Tokugawa Japan. Princeton University Press.
- Rozman, Gilbert, ed. (1981). The Modernization of China. Free Press and Collier Macmillan.
- Jansen, Marius B.; Rozman, Gilbert, eds. (1986). Japan in Transition from Tokugawa to Meiji. Princeton University Press.
- Rozman, Gilbert, ed. (1991). The East Asian Region: Confucian Heritage and Its Modern Adaptation. Princeton University Press.
- Rozman, Gilbert, ed. (2012). East Asian National Identities: Common Roots and Chinese Exceptionalism. Stanford University Press.
