= The Fascist Effect =

2015 book by Reto Hofmann

- Author: Reto Hofmann
- Language: English
- Subject: Fascism in Japan
- Publisher: Cornell University Press
- Publication date: June 5, 2015
- Publication place: United States
- Pages: 203
- ISBN: 978-0-8014-5636-7

The Fascist Effect: Japan and Italy, 1915–1952 is a 2015 non-fiction book by Australian historian Reto Hofmann, published by Cornell University Press. Beginning with the story of Shimoi Harukichi in 1915, it covers how he deliberately adapted fascism to suit Japanese national purposes, followed by analysis of the contemporary popularity of Benito Mussolini in Japan while fascist ideals began to be accepted, often by the left and the right. It ends with an analysis of Japan's place in the Axis powers and the fall of fascist regimes. The book was generally well received by critics, and seen as suitable for both academic and enthusiast audiences.

== Contents ==
The Fascist Effect is dived into five chapters:

1. Mediator of Fascism: Shimoi Harukichi, 1915–1928
2. The Mussolini Boom, 1928–1931
3. The Clash of Fascisms, 1931–1937
4. Imperial Convergence: The Italo-Ethiopian War and Japanese World-Order Thinking, 1935–1936
5. Fascism in World History, 1937–1943

They are followed by an epilogue, "Fascism after the New World Order, 1943–1952", as well as a bibliography and an index.

The first chapter focuses on Harukichi Shimoi, a Japanese expatriate in Italy between 1915 and 1925. Inspired by the Italian front of World War I, he became a follower of Gabriele D'Annunzio and Benito Mussolini, and wrote pro-Fascist literature upon his return. Hoffman argues that Shimoi did not want to directly bring Italian fascism to Japan; instead, he wanted to use it to inspire the Japanese youth to create their own "patriotic politics". His success as a "philosopher of Fascism" in Japan established a base for right-wing politics even after he personally stopped having influence on Japanese politics.

The next chapter addresses the views of Mussolini in Japan, who was seen as a "great man" for Italy in a time when liberal politics and capitalism were failing. Although he was often unpopular with both liberals and conservatives in Japan, either for his repressive policies or the potential threat his ideology could inspire towards the monarchy, his aggressive positioning for Italy in international politics and personal charisma resulted in some wide admiration and popularity. Hofmann argues that Mussolini and Italian fascism were not seen as something to emulate directly, instead serving as a center for political discourse.

The third chapter addresses the changing definition of Fascism as Nazism rose to prominence in Germany, with Hofmann viewing Italian Fascism retaining its prominence. Hofmann argues that Japanese intellectuals and politicians began to see Fascism as a global phenomenon that addressed the failures of capitalism, with the particulars depending on exactly where it emerged in each case. At the beginning of the 1930s, as the left criticized the government for exhibiting Fascist tendencies, the right also denied association with Fascism as a foreign ideology, despite adopting its tactics. By the end, Japanese Fascists admitted to identifying with Italian and German Fascism while considering Japanese fascism to be uniquely superior.

The final two chapters discuss Japanese reactions to the Second Italo-Ethiopian War and the beginnings of Japan's entry into the Axis powers. The invasion of Ethiopia was initially popularly condemned as a brutal example of Western imperialism; however, the contradictions exemplified by the previous Japanese invasion of Manchuria eventually resulted in it being praised as Italy standing up against Anglo-American hegemony. This increased identification continued with the signing of the Anti-Comintern Pact in 1936 and the Tripartite Pact in 1940, which showed their power on the world stage, despite a lack of common ground between them as allies. The epilogue discusses the downfall of the Fascist regimes and what Hofmann views as the denial of Fascist values as anything other than an anti-Communist alliance.

== Publication history ==
The Fascist Effect was published on June 5, 2015, by Cornell University Press. The author, Reto Hofmann, was a scholar of 20th-century Japanese history at Monash University at the time.

== Reception ==
The Fascist Effect received generally positive reviews from critics. The quality of its writing and the engaging storytelling were frequently praised. Writing in Monumenta Nipponica, Andrew Gordon considered it to be one of the most important works about fascism published in English, alongside Yoshiaki Yoshimi's Grassroots Fascism and Lee K. Pennington's Casualties of History. Historians Aaron William Moore and Annika A. Culver praised its applicability to students of comparative history and of Japanese history, European history, and political philosophy.

In Itinerario, Italian historian Annalisa Urbano praised Hofmann's storytelling and use of varied primary sources, but thought the ending was too short and that a comparative use of primary sources from Italian were lacking, having been limited to a few issues of Mussolini's newspaper Il Popolo d'Italia. Despite this, she still wrote that it was "excellent" overall and useful to scholars in all of its related fields. American historian David Aliano wrote in The Historian that a "more systematic selection and analysis" and explanations in context of the primary sources would have been useful to explain how important the events being discussed were, but praised the book's appeal to both professional and wide audiences and contributions to the study of fascism.

The Journal of Asian Studies's Ethan Mark praised the "enlightening and novel" analysis of Japan as a mirror of Italy during the covered time period and the contradictions shown in Japanese Fascist ideology. Although Urbano called the book "concise and to the point", Mark argued that the length of time covered in only 140 pages of content lead to a lack of context throughout the book. Additionally, while believing that Hofmann was correct that many claims that the Japanese government was fascist were dismissed unfairly, he did not appropriately engage with the literature of those who had previously, while also overlooking the ways in which Japanese Fascism truly was different than the Italian or German varieties, in large part due to their own dealings around colonial holdings.

It was one of three shortlisted finalists for the Australian History Awards's 2016 W.K. Hancock Prize, given to Australian authors of any debut work of history, won by Adam Clulow's The Company and The Shogun.
