= Nitobe Memorial Garden =

Traditional Japanese garden located at the University of British Columbia

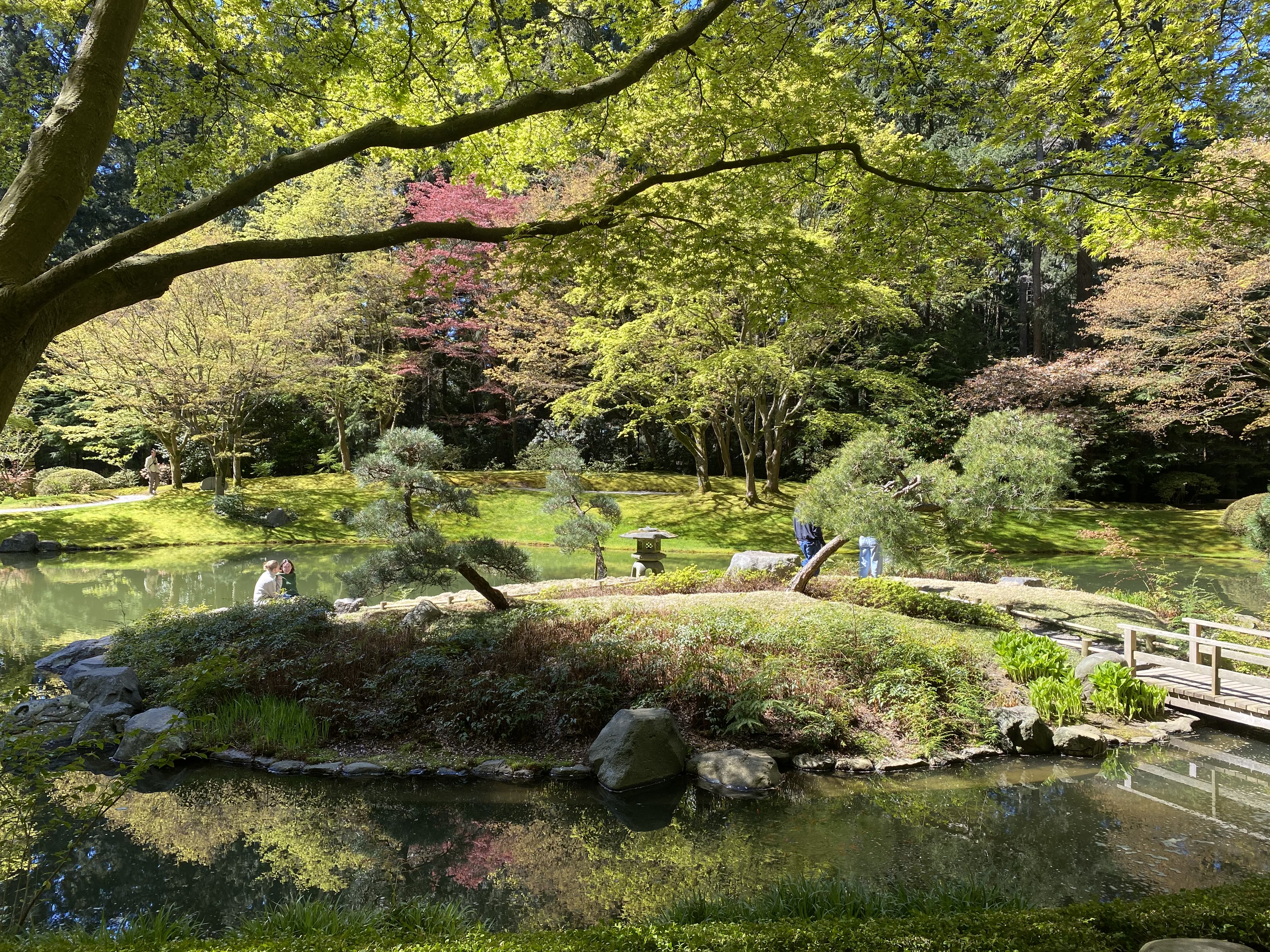
- Nitobe Memorial Garden during mid-April
- Interactive map of Nitobe Memorial Garden
- Type: Japanese garden
- Location: 1895 Lower Mall, Vancouver, BC, Canada
- Coordinates: 49.26644°N 123.25967°W,
- Area: 2.5-acre (10,000 m^{2})
- Established: 1960; 66 years ago
- Operator: UBC Botanical Garden
- Status: Open to the public
- Website: botanicalgarden.ubc.ca/visit/nitobe-memorial-garden/

The Nitobe Memorial Garden is a 2 1/2-acre (one hectare) traditional Japanese garden located at the University of British Columbia, just outside the city limits of Vancouver, British Columbia, Canada. Although it is part of the UBC Botanical Garden, Nitobe Memorial Garden is located next to UBC's Asian Centre, two kilometres from the main UBC Botanical Garden.

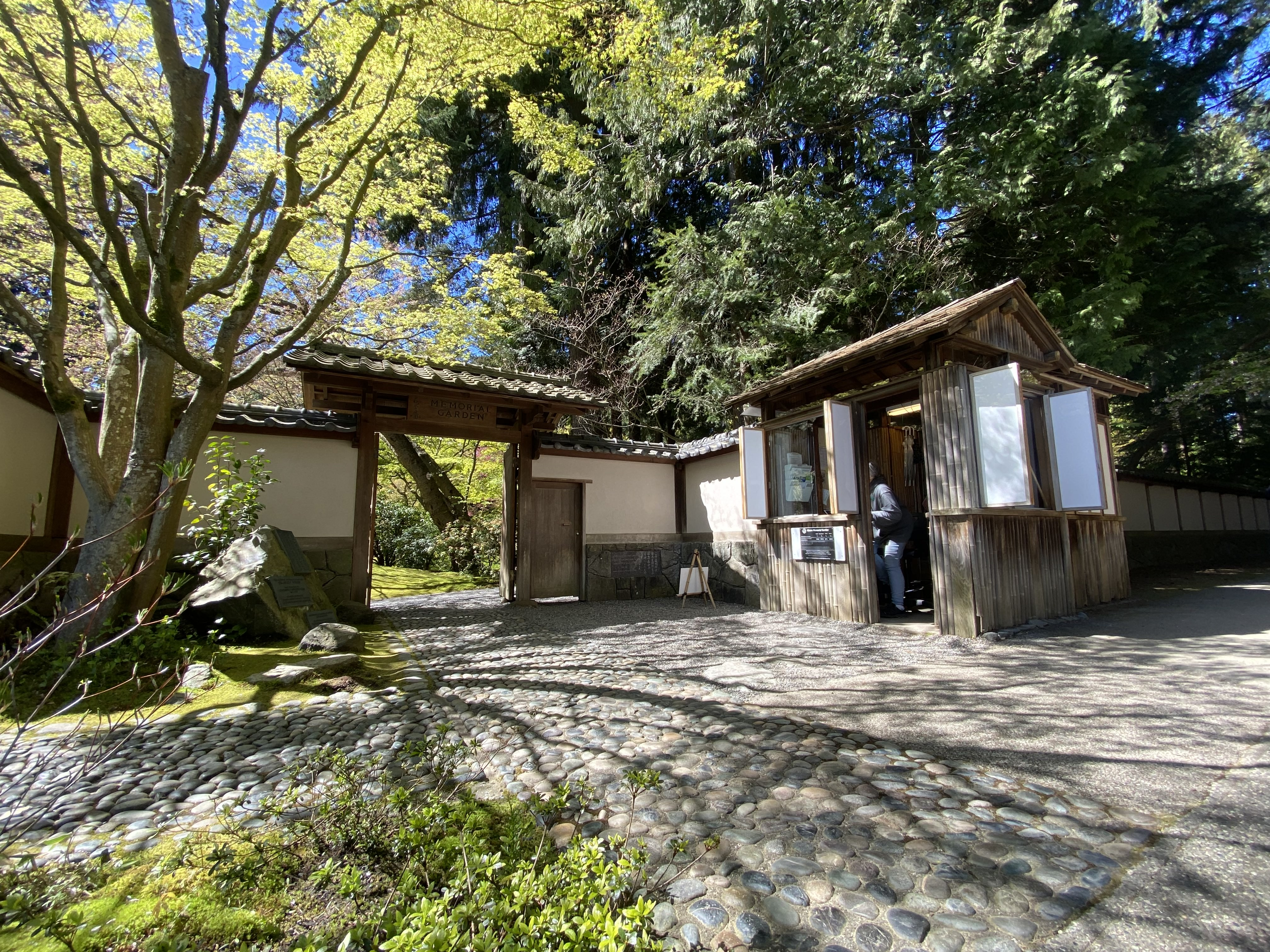
The entrance features a wood constructed archway and a small ticket booth to the right.

== Background and history ==
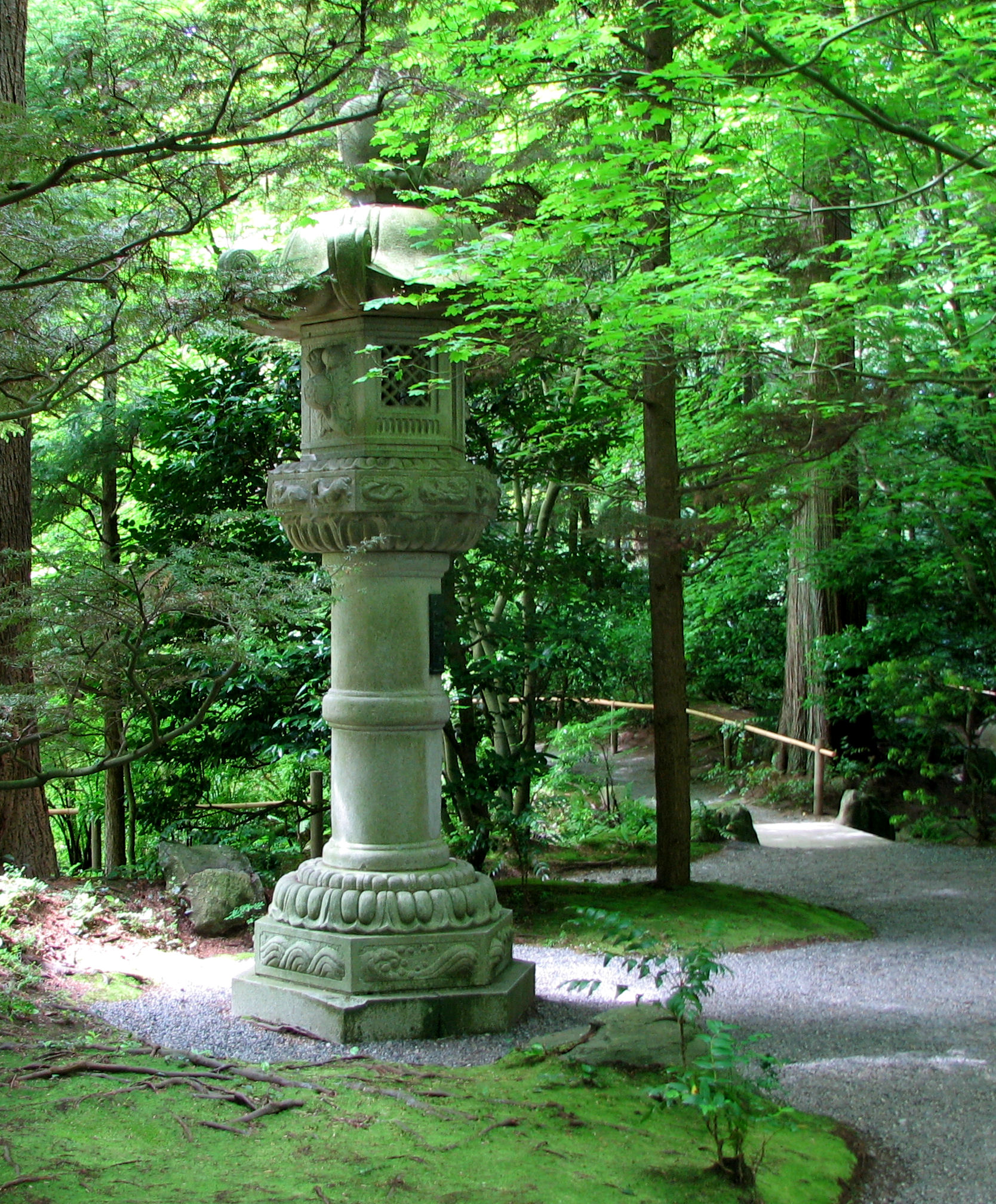
The stone memorial erected during the restoration in honour of I. Nitobe.

The garden honours Japanese agronomist, diplomat, political scientist, politician, and writer Nitobe Inazō (1862–1933), who died in Victoria, British Columbia (now the sister city of Nitobe's home town Morioka), and whose goal was "to become a bridge across the Pacific".

In recognition of his distinguished international service and his efforts to promote a closer understanding between Japan and Canada, friends of Dr. Nitobe and members of the Japanese community in Vancouver, and the Government of Japan erected a permanent stone memorial on the campus of UBC.

However, the memorial garden was ruined during World War II, possibly due to anti‐Japanese feelings at the time. Afterwards, the Japanese community in Vancouver and the Government of Japan agreed to build the current Nitobe Memorial Garden. Most of the construction costs were covered by the Japan–Canada Society in Tokyo, and a fund‐raising campaign by the Japanese community in Vancouver, although some grants were received from The Canada Council and The Leon and Thea Koerner Foundation. The Japan–Canada Society in Tokyo contributed over $21,000 and the Japanese Canadian community in B.C. collected over $7,000. Through the offices of the Japan Consul, the Government of Japan selected Kannosuke Mori (1894–1960) from Chiba University to design the Garden. Mori arrived early in 1959 and stayed at the University until after the official opening of the garden in June, 1960.

The case of Nitobe Memorial Garden's restoration represents the problems all historic preservation can face. As Mori recognized, the maintenance of a Japanese garden, more than any other style of garden in the world, requires significant collaboration. With a proper maintenance plan, the Japanese garden outside of Japan can be a place where an institution and community collaborate, promoting cultural understanding through the process. However, once a garden lacks proper management, it can become a place of humiliation and cultural misunderstanding.

The Nitobe Memorial Garden has also been the subject of more than fifteen years' study by a UBC professor, who believes that its construction hides a number of impressive features, including references to Japanese philosophy and mythology, shadow bridges visible only at certain times of year, and positioning of a lantern that is filled with light at the exact date and time of Nitobe's death each year. The garden is behind the university's Asian Centre, which is built with steel girders from Japan's exhibit at the 1970 Osaka Expo.

== Features ==
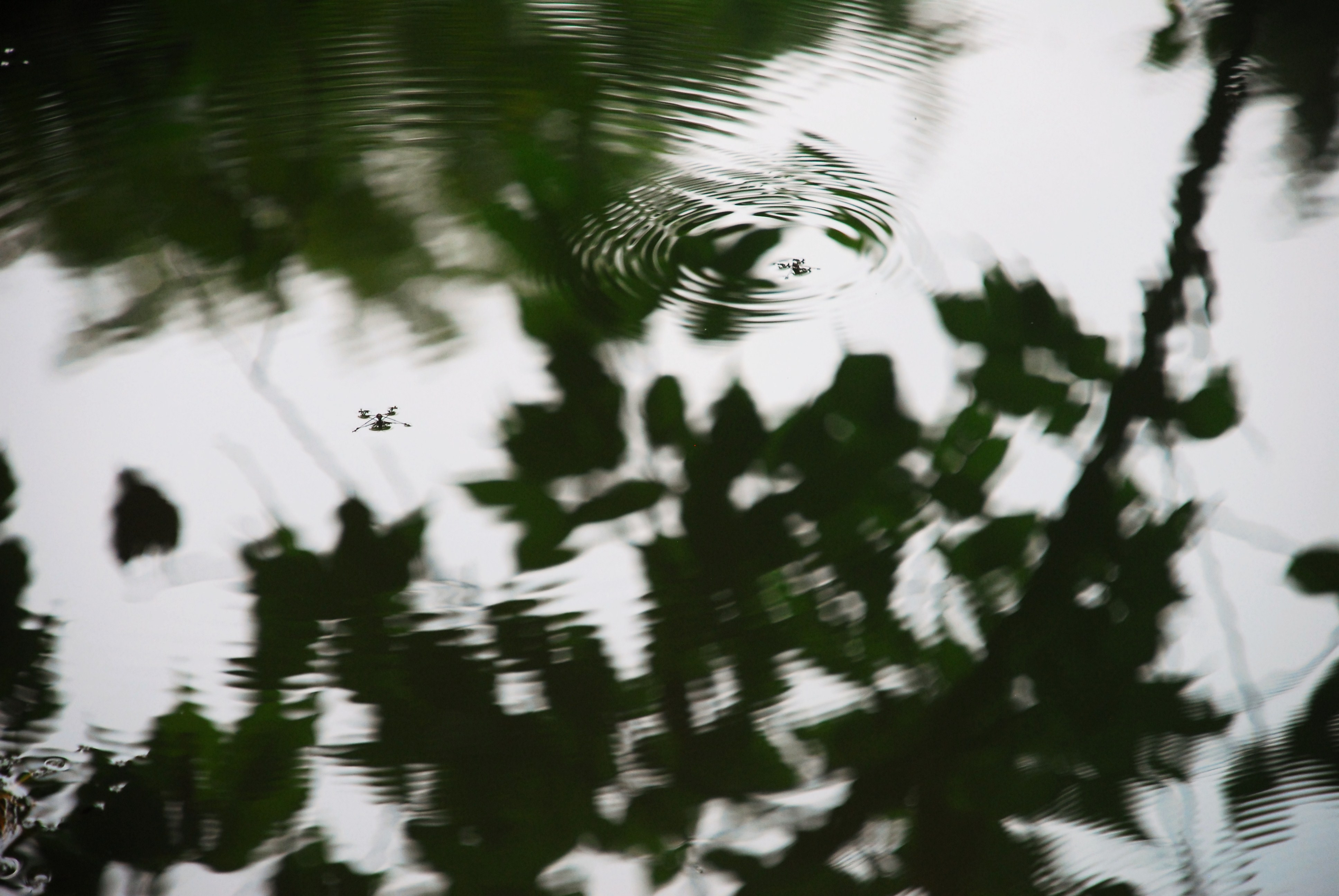
Water walking insects on the pond.

The Nitobe Memorial Garden features a fully functional Japanese tea house called Ichibō-an, surrounded by an outer roji tea garden with a waiting bench, and an inner garden.

The garden also features several lanterns of different varieties, including a snow viewing lantern and the Nitobe Lantern, featuring carvings of a zodiac, chrysanthemums, a dog (Nitobe's birth sign), and the inscription "I.M., Inazo Nitobe, 1861–1933, Apostle of Goodwill Among Nations", erected by his friends". Another feature of the garden is its pond, which supports a small ecosystem of fish as well as some water skimming insects.

First time visitors to the garden will benefit from reading the self-guided tour handout, as the Zen garden has no signs indicating the correct way to walk its irregular paths, as signs would be considered a distraction. It is recommended to spend around 45-minutes to fully immerse into and appreciate the natural beauty and symbolism the Nitobe Garden offers to travellers, which also offers alternative paths other than the gravel path surrounding the perimeter of the pond.

== Local engagement and community events ==
The garden attracts visitors in many different ways. From daily tour groups, visitors, and weddings, the garden attracts visitors from all over the world. The garden is set on one of the largest university campuses in Canada and Vancouver is a world famous city. For both of these reasons, the garden is able to attract year round visitors. An active marketing and communications department at the UBC Botanical Garden also serves an important role in attracting visitors to the garden.

Centennial Celebrations at Nitobe 2016 marked the 100th anniversary of the UBC Botanical Garden. Included in the celebrations were events at the Nitobe Memorial Garden, with a Tanabata event on July 7, 2016. Other events in the year were to run concurrently with events at UBC Botanical Garden to serve as a means of attracting visitors to both the Nitobe Memorial Garden and the UBC Botanical Garden as the gardens move into their second century.
