= Pekka Korhonen =

Finnish political scientist

Pekka Korhonen (born 21 August 1955 in Suonenjoki) is a Finnish political scientist. He is a professor of world politics at the University of Jyväskylä, Finland. His research interests concern world politics and Asia. Korhonen is currently studying Asia as a concept.

== Selected works ==
- Hans Morgenthau, intellektuaalinen historia [Hans Morgenthau, intellectual history]. Jälkisanat Kari Palonen. University of Jyväskylä, Institute of Political Science, Publications No. 46/1983.
- The Geometry of Power. Johan Galtung's Conception of Power. Tampere Peace Research Institute, Research Reports No. 38, Tampere 1990.
- Japan and the Pacific Free Trade Area. Routledge, London & New York, 1994.
- Japan and Asia Pacific Integration: Pacific Romances 1968-1996. London and New York: Routledge, 1998.
- アジアの西の境、京都：国際日本文化研究センター、2000年 Ajia no Nishi no Sakai. Kyoto: Kokusai Nihon bunka kenkyū sentā, 2000.
- Katalin Miklóssy & Pekka Korhonen (eds):The East and the Idea of Europe. Newcastle upon Tyne: Cambridge Scholars Publishing, 2010.
- Olli-Pekka Moisio & Pekka Korhonen & Marja Järvelä & Eeva Lehtonen (eds):Ovia yhteiskuntatieteisiin [Doors to Social Sciences] Jyväskylä: Sophi, 2012. https://jyx.jyu.fi/dspace/handle/123456789/37480.

=== Articles in international refereed journals ===
1.'The Theory of the Flying Geese Pattern of Development and Its Interpretations'. Journal of Peace Research, 1994, Vol. 31, No 1, pp. 93–108.

2. 'Economism as a Pacific Peace Project'. Philippine Political Science Journal, 1994–95, Nos 37–38, pp. 1–28.

3. 'The Pacific Age in World History'. Journal of World History, Spring 1996, Vol. 7, No. 1, pp. 41–70. (Chinese version:"世界史上的太平洋时代"[with a new postscript], trans. Guanhua Chen陈冠华 and Boyi Chen陈博翼, Studies of Maritime History海洋史研究 9 (2016): 3-31.)

4.'Monopolizing Asia. The Politics of a Metaphor', The Pacific Review, 1997, Vol. 10, No. 3, pp. 347–365. Anthologized in Peter W. Preston (ed.) Political Change in East Asia, Ashgate: Aldershot, 2003.

5. 'Naming Spaces', Fennia, 1999, Vol. 177, No. 2, pp. 123–136.

6. 'Akamatsu Kaname (1896-1974). Entwicklungstheorie in Ostasien: Das Gänseflug-Modell', Entwicklung und Zusammenarbeit 1999, Vol. 40, No. 6, pp. 169–171.

7. 'The Political Geography of Okakura Tenshin', Nichibunken Japan Review, 2001, No. 13, pp. 107–127.

8. 'Asia's Chinese Name', Inter-Asia Cultural Studies, 2002, Vol. 3, No 2, pp. 253–270.

9.'Common Culture. Asia Rhetoric in the Beginning of the Twentieth Century', Inter-Asia Cultural Studies, 2008, Vol. 9, No 3, pp. 395–417.

10.'Changing Definitions of Asia', Asia-Europe Journal, 2012; Vol. 10, No 2-3, pp. 99–112.

11. 'Tora-san and Kurosagi as Symbols of Changing Japanese Society', Journal of Intimate and Public Spheres, 2013, Vol 2, No 1, pp. 145–146. ISSN 2185-2863

12. Leaving Asia? The Meaning of Datsu-A and Japan's Modern History アジアを去る？脱亞の意味と日本の近代史。The Asia-Pacific Journal, Vol. 12, Issue 9, No. 3, March 3, 2014.
