= Tadao Umesao =

Japanese anthropologist (1920–2010)

- Born: June 13, 1920; Japan Kyoto Prefecture
- Died: July 13, 2010 (aged 90)
- Other name: 梅棹 忠夫
- Occupation: anthropologist

Tadao Umesao (梅棹 忠夫, Umesao Tadao; June 13, 1920 – July 3, 2010) was a Japanese anthropologist. A professor for decades at Kyoto University, he was also among the founders and the director-general of National Museum of Ethnology in Osaka, Japan. A number of Umesao's theories were influential on anthropologists, and his work was also well known among the general population of Japan.

== Publications ==
=== In Japanese ===
- 1956 Exploration to the Moghols in Afghanistan, Iwanami Shoten
- 1957 Ethnological Conception of the History of Civilizations, Chuo Koron-sha
- 1969 The Art of Intellectual Production, Iwanami Shoten
- 1974 The Japanese in the Global Age, Chuo Koron-sha
- 1976 The World of Hunting and Nomadism, Kodansha
- 1986 The Formation and Development of Modern Japanese Civilization, Nihon Hoso Shuppan Kyokai
- 1987 The Museum as Media, Heibonsha
- 1988 Civilization Theory on Information, Chuo Koron-sha
- 1988 Women and Civilization, Chuo Koron-sha
- 1989 Research Management Theory, Iwanami Shoten
- 1989–94 Collected Works of Tadao Umesao, Chuo Koron-sha
- 1997 Action and Imagination: an autobiography, Nihon Keizai Shinbunsha
- 2000 Japanese Civilization in the Modern World: Comparative Study of Civilizations, Chuo Koron Shinsha

=== In other languages ===
- 1983 Le Japon à l'ère Planétaire, Paris : Publications Orientalistes de France.
- 1984 Il Giappone Nell'era Planetaria, Milano: Spirali Edizioni.
- 1988 “Prolegomena zu einer historischen Betrachtung zivilisierter Lebensformen“ in Japan ohne Mythos, Munich: Iudicium.
- 1998 The Roots of Contemporary Japan (trilingual in English, Japanese and Chinese), Tokyo: The Japan Forum.
- 2002 Ecological and Anthropological Study of the Nomadic Culture of Mongolia, Hohhot: People's Press of Inner Mongolia.
- 2003 An Ecological View of History: Japanese Civilization in the World Context, Edited by Harumi Befu, Translated by Beth Cary, Melbourne: Trans Pacific Press.
- An Ecological View of History was also translated into Chinese (Shanghai, 1988) and Vietnamese (Ha Noi, 2007)

== Awards and honors ==
- Jan. 1988 The Asahi Prize, Japan
- Apr. 1988 Commandeur, Ordre des Palmes Académiques, France
- May 1988 Medal with Purple Ribbon, Japan
- Oct. 1990 Japan Foundation Award, 1990.
- Nov. 1991 Person of Cultural Merit, Japan
- Nov. 1994 Order of Culture, Japan
- Jul. 1998 Person of Cultural Merit, Mongolia
- Nov. 1999 Grand Cordon of the Order of the Sacred Treasure, Japan
- Oct. 2002 C&C Prize (Foundation for Computers and Communications Promotion), Japan
