= Nitobe Inazō =

Japanese writer and diplomat (1862–1933)

Senior Third Rank Nitobe Inazō
- 新渡戸 稲造
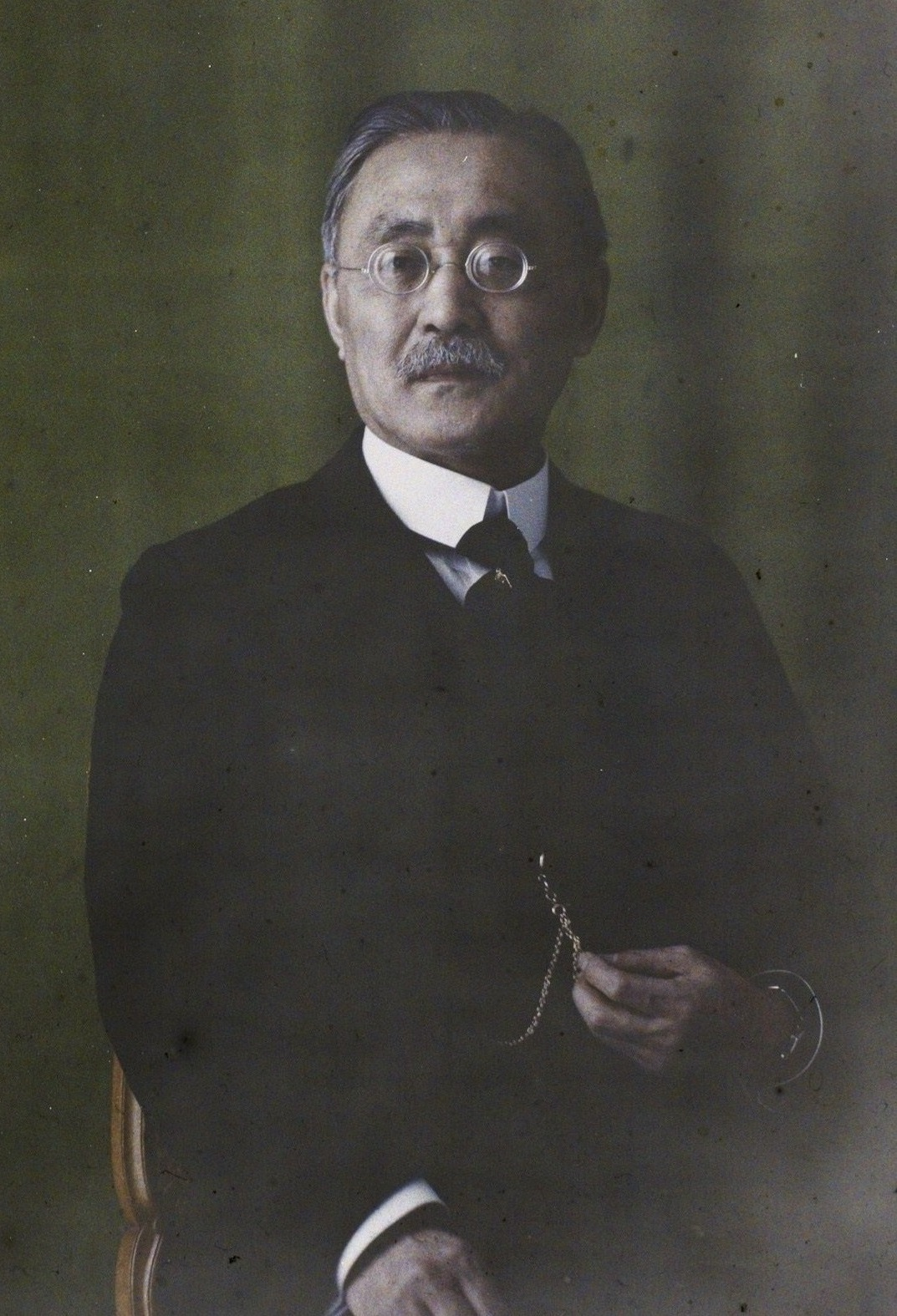
- 1922 Autochrome by Auguste Léon

Member of the House of Peers
- In office December 7, 1926 – October 15, 1933 Nominated by the Emperor

Personal details
- Born: September 1, 1862 Morioka, Mutsu, Japan
- Died: October 15, 1933 (aged 71) Victoria, British Columbia, Canada
- Spouse: Mary Patterson Elkinton (m. 1891)
- Children: Nitobe Yoshio; Nitobe Kotoko
- Education: Johns Hopkins University (BA); Martin Luther University Halle-Wittenberg (PhD); Kyoto Imperial University (LLD)
- Occupation: Agronomist, diplomat, political scientist, politician, writer

Nitobe Inazō (新渡戸 稲造; September 1, 1862 – October 15, 1933) was a Japanese agronomist, diplomat, political scientist, politician, and writer. He studied at Sapporo Agricultural College under the influence of its first president William S. Clark and later went to the United States to study agricultural policy. After returning to Japan, he served as a professor at Sapporo Agricultural College, Kyoto Imperial University, and Tokyo Imperial University, and the deputy secretary general of the League of Nations. He also devoted himself to women's education, helping to found the Tsuda Eigaku Juku and serving as the first president of Tokyo Woman's Christian University and president of the Tokyo Women's College of Economics. He was also a strong advocate for Japanese colonialism, and described Korean people as "primitive".

== Early life ==
Nitobe was born in Morioka, Mutsu Province (present-day Iwate Prefecture). His father Nitobe Jūjirō was a samurai and retainer to the local daimyō of the Nanbu clan. His grandfather was Nitobe Tsutō and his great-grandfather was Nitobe Denzō (Koretami). One of his cousins was Nitobe Inao. His infant name was Inanosuke. Nitobe left Morioka for Tokyo in 1871 to become the heir to his uncle, Ōta Tokitoshi, and adopted the name Ōta Inazō. He reverted to Nitobe in 1889, when his older brother Nitobe Shichirō died.

== Educational career ==
Nitobe was in the second class of the Sapporo Agricultural College (now Hokkaido University). He was converted to Christianity under the strong legacy left by William S. Clark, the first Vice-Principal of the College, who had taught in Sapporo for eight months before Nitobe's class arrived in the second year after the opening of the college and so they never personally crossed paths. Nitobe's classmates who converted to Christianity at the same time included Uchimura Kanzō. Nitobe and his friends were baptized by an American Methodist Episcopal missionary Bishop M. C. Harris. Nitobe's decision to study agriculture was caused by the hope expressed by Emperor Meiji that the Nitobe family would continue to advance the field of agricultural development (Nitobe's father had developed former wasteland in the north of the Nambu domain near present-day Towada, now part of Aomori Prefecture, into productive farmland).

In 1883, Nitobe entered Tokyo Imperial University for further studies in English literature and in economics. Disappointed by the level of research in Tokyo, he quit the university and sought study opportunities in the United States.

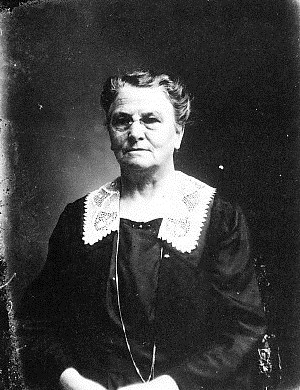
Mary Patterson Elkinton

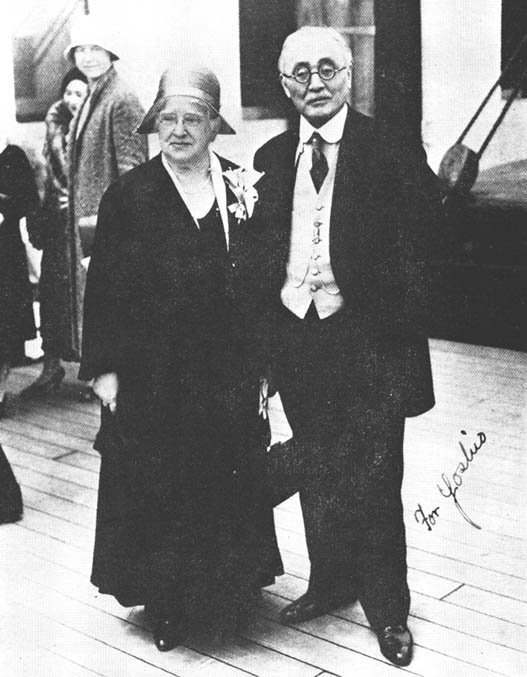
Nitobe and his wife Mary (1932)

In 1884, Nitobe traveled to the United States where he stayed for three years, and studied economics and political science at Johns Hopkins University in Baltimore, Maryland. In Baltimore, he became a member of the Religious Society of Friends (Quakers). It was through a Quaker community in Philadelphia that he met Mary Patterson Elkinton, whom he eventually married. Their only child died in infancy, but they adopted Nitobe's nephew, Yoshio, and a female relative Kotoko. He also influenced the establishment of the Friends School in Tokyo. At Johns Hopkins, he participated in the Seminary of History and Politics, a group of graduate students and faculty in history, political science and economics. After his departure from Hopkins in 1887, a colleague read a paper written by Nitobe in 1888, "The Japanese in America", in which he studied the first official missions sent from Japan to the United States, beginning in 1860. He later returned to Hopkins in December 1890, when he presented a paper on "Travel and Study in Germany." Also in 1890, Johns Hopkins presented Nitobe with an honorary bachelor's degree in recognition of his accomplishments despite not earning a PhD from Hopkins.

While at Johns Hopkins, he was granted an assistant professorship at his alma mater, the Sapporo Agricultural College, but was ordered first to obtain a doctorate in agricultural economics in Germany. He completed his degree after three years in Halle University and returned briefly to the United States to marry Mary Elkinton in Philadelphia before he assumed his teaching position in Sapporo in 1891. When he returned to Japan, he had published books in English and in German and had received the first of his five doctorate degrees.

Nitobe continued his teaching tenure at Sapporo until 1897 as he took leave from the college. He spent three years writing first in Japan and later in California. One of the books that he wrote during that period was Bushido: The Soul of Japan.

== Meiji bureaucrat and academic ==
In 1901, Nitobe was appointed technical advisor to the Japanese colonial government in Taiwan, where he headed the Sugar Bureau.

Nitobe was appointed a full professor of law at the Kyoto Imperial University in 1904 and lectured on colonial studies. He became the headmaster of the First Higher School (then the preparatory division for the Tokyo Imperial University) in 1906 and continued this position until he accepted the full-time professorship at the Law Faculty of Tokyo Imperial University in 1913. He taught agricultural economics and colonial studies and emphasized humanitarian aspect of colonial development and critical assessment of colonialism, and was cross-appointed the founding president of Tokyo Woman's Christian University (Tokyo Joshi Dai). His students at Tokyo Imperial University included Tadao Yanaihara, Shigeru Nanbara, Yasaka Takagi, and Tamon Maeda. (Yanaihara later continued Nitobe's chair in colonial studies at Tokyo University; but Yanaihara's pacifist views and emphasis on indigenous self-determination, which he partly inherited from Nitobe, came into a full conflict with Japan's wartime government during World War II, with the result that Yanaihara was barred from teaching until after the war).

Nitobe and Hamilton Wright Mabie in 1911 were the first exchange professors between Japan and the United States under the auspices of the Carnegie Endowment for International Peace.

After World War I, Nitobe joined other international and reform-minded Japanese in organizing the Japan Council of the Institute of Pacific Relations.

=== Advocacy for Japanese colonialism ===
Nitobe has been described by the Nitobe College at Hokkaido University as the "academic pillar of support for Japan when it expanded its colonies and its rule/control in Asia".

He was a strong advocate for Japan's colonization of Korea, which he described as a "literally a one-in-a-million chance". He argued that Japan was on a noble civilizing mission in Korea. He described Korea in an October 1906 essay entitled "A Decaying Nation" as feeling like it was technologically 3,000 years behind Japan, and that Koreans were so "bland, unsophisticated and primitive that they belong not to the twentieth or the tenth—nor indeed to the first century. They belong to a prehistoric age". He further argued that:

The settlement of Korea must be given special attention. A poor effeminate people, with no political instinct, with no economic 'gumption', with no intellectual ambition, is become the Brown Japanese Man's burden. Something must be done to resurrect a dead nation.

After Japan suppressed the March First Movement protests in colonial Korea, Nitobe defended Japan's actions in Korea. He said that:

Japan is willing to grant Korea six months independence, because Japan is confident that the Koreans would return to them for guidance after the test period is ended.

== Diplomat ==
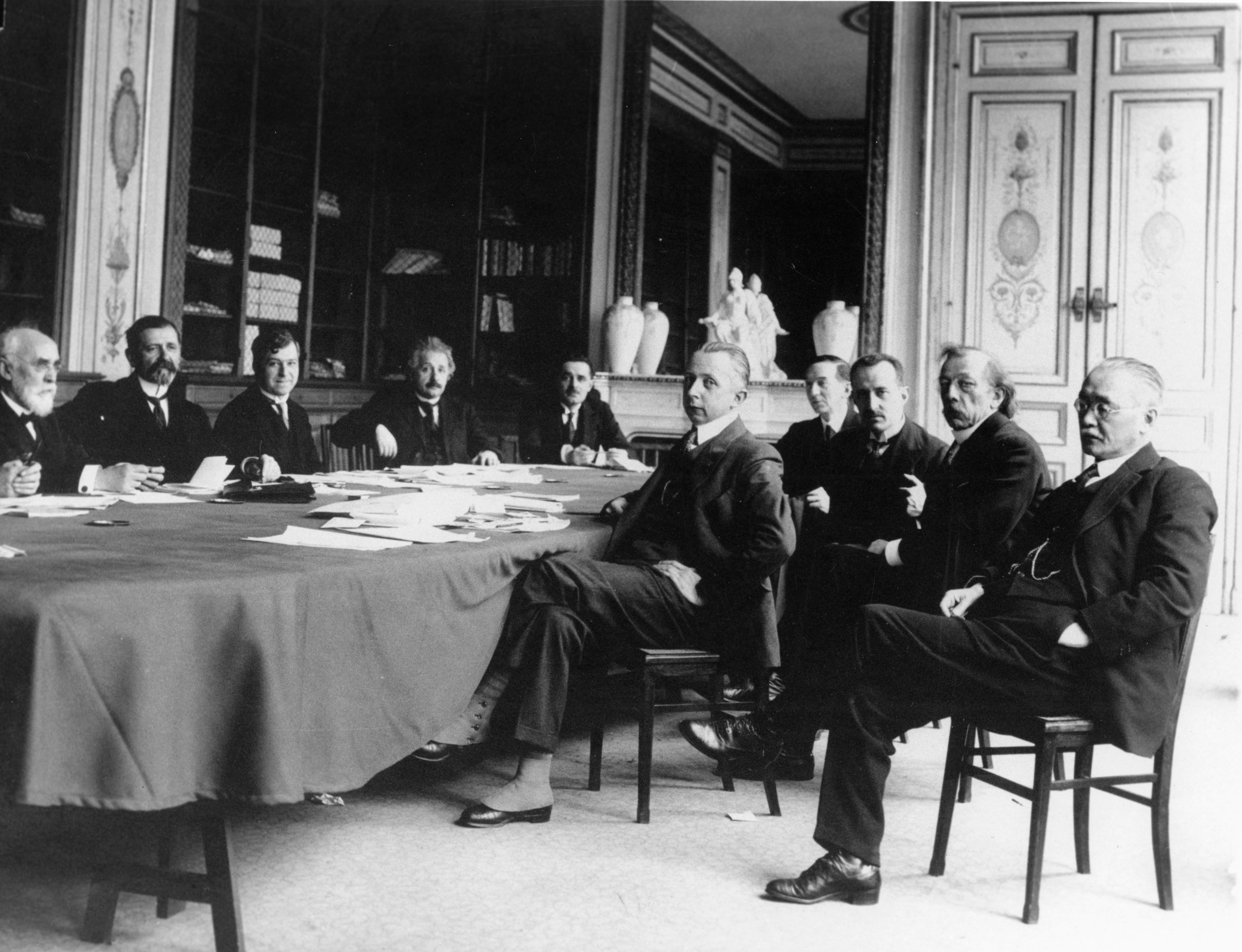
Nitobe (right) at a session of the ICIC

When the League of Nations was established in 1920, Nitobe became one of the Under-Secretaries General of the League, and moved to Geneva, Switzerland. He became the director of the International Bureaux Section, in charge of the International Committee on Intellectual Cooperation (which later became UNESCO under the United Nations' mandate). His legacy in this period includes the settlement of territorial dispute between Sweden and Finland over Swedish-speaking Åland. In its resolution, the Islands remained under the Finnish control, but adopted complete disarmament (i.e., no military presence on the islands and its citizens are exempt from military service) and granted autonomy, averting a possible armed conflict (See also Åland crisis).

In August 1921, Nitobe took part in the 13th World Congress of Esperanto in Prague, as the official delegate of the League of Nations. His report to the General Assembly of the League was the first objective report on Esperanto by a high-ranking official representative of an intergovernmental organization. Although the proposal for the League to accept Esperanto as their working language was accepted by ten delegates, the French delegate used his veto power to block the issue.

After his retirement from the League of Nations, Nitobe briefly served in the House of Peers in the Japanese Imperial Parliament; and he delivered a speech against militaristic prime minister Giichi Tanaka in the aftermath of the Huanggutun Incident (1928). He held critical views on increasing militarism in Japan in the early 1930s, and was devastated by Japan's withdrawal from the League of Nations in 1933 over the Manchurian Crisis and the Lytton Report.

In October 1933, Nitobe attended a conference in Banff, Alberta, of the Institute of Pacific Relations, where the background and research papers from the Japanese delegation largely defended Japanese expansionist policies. On his way home from the conference, Nitobe's pneumonia took a turn for the worse and was rushed to the Royal Jubilee Hospital in Victoria, British Columbia, Canada. Following an operation he died on October 15, 1933. Morioka, Nitobe's birthplace, and Victoria have been sister cities since 1985. Mary Elkinton Nitobe lived in Japan until her death in 1938. Mary compiled and edited many of Nitobe's unpublished manuscripts, including his memoirs of early childhood, and contributed greatly to the preservation of his writings.

== Legacy ==
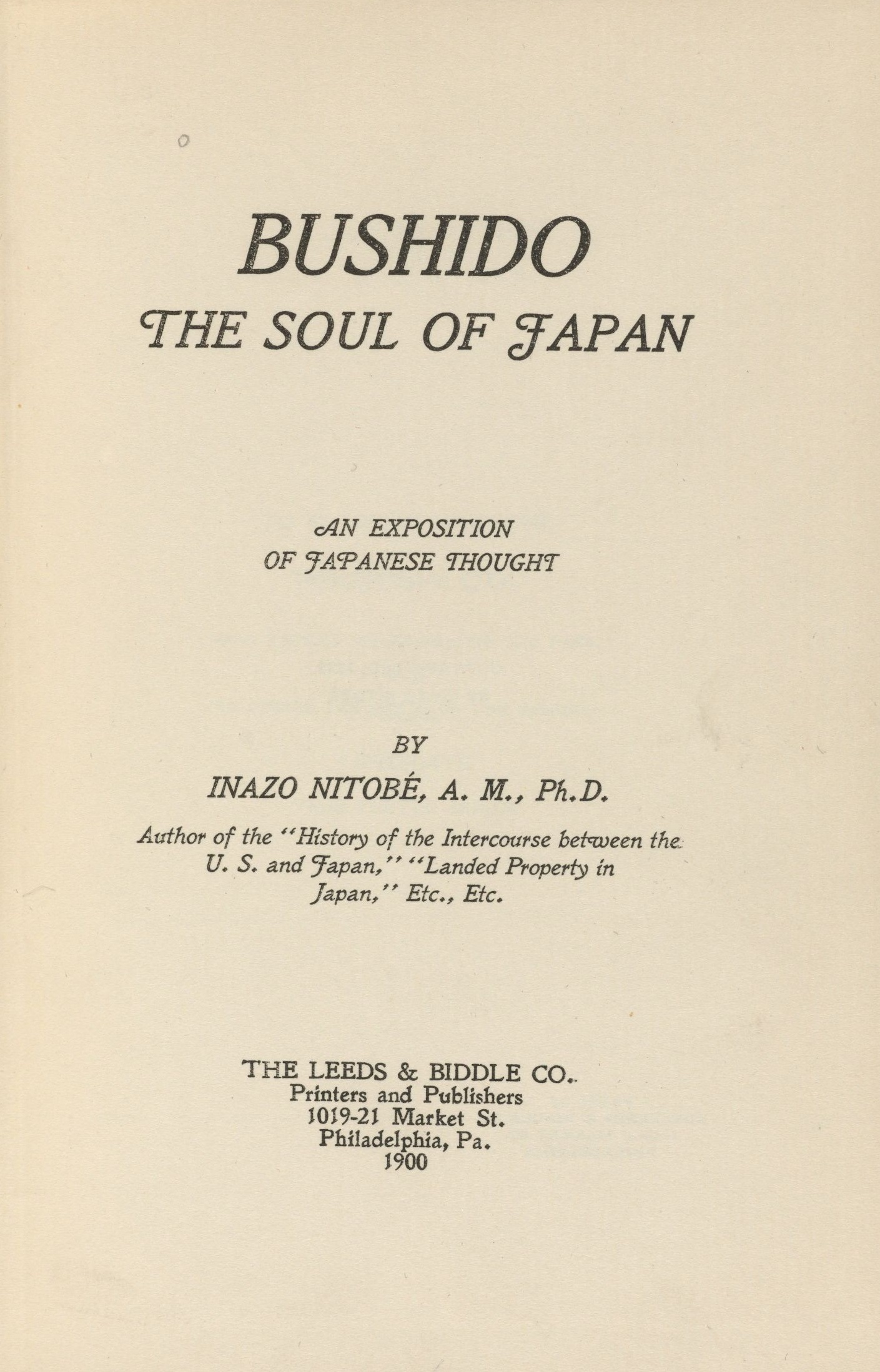
Title page of Bushido: The Soul of Japan (1900)

Nitobe published many scholarly books as well as books for general readers (see below). He also contributed hundreds of articles to popular magazines and newspapers. Nitobe, however, is perhaps most famous in the west for his work Bushido: The Soul of Japan (1900), which was one of the first major works on samurai ethics and Japanese culture written originally in English for Western readers (The book was subsequently translated into Japanese and many other languages).

The reception and impact of Bushido: The Soul of Japan were quite different in Japan and the West, however, with Japanese scholars such as Inoue Tetsujirō and Tsuda Sōkichi criticizing or dismissing the book. It was not until the 1980s that Bushido: The Soul of Japan reached the height of its popularity in Japan, and is now the most widely available work on the subject of bushido. In the West, Bushido: The Soul of Japan has been a best-seller since the outbreak of the Russo-Japanese War of 1904-05, and many influential foreigners read the book, among them US Presidents Theodore Roosevelt and John F. Kennedy, as well as Robert Baden-Powell, the founder of the Boy Scouts. It suggested to H. G. Wells a way to "solve the problem of combining progress with political stability". The book has been criticized as portraying the samurai in terms of Western chivalry which had different interpretations compared to the pre-Meiji period bushido as a system of warrior values that were focused on valor rather than morals. This book nonetheless was a pioneering work of its kind.

Nitobe's writings are now available in Nitobe Inazō Zenshū (the Complete Works of Inazo Nitobe), a 25-volume set from Kyobunkan, 1969–2001. His English and other western language work are collected in the 5 volume Works of Inazo Nitobe, The University of Tokyo Press, 1972.

Major critical essays on Nitobe's life and thought were collected in John F. Howes, ed. Nitobe Inazo: Japan's Bridge Across the Pacific (Westview, 1995). Full biography in English is: George M. Oshiro, Internationalist in Pre-War Japan: Nitobe Inazo, 1862–1933 (UBC PhD. Thesis, 1986); and in Japanese by the same author: Nitobe Inazo, Kokusai-shugi no Kaitakusha (Chūō Daigaku Shuppanbu, 1992). The most detailed account of Nitobe's life after his tenure in the League of Nations, available in English, is: Nitobe Inazo, The Twilight Years, by Uchikawa Eiichiro (Kyobunkwan, 1985). Six (6) critical essays on Nitobe's legacy are included in Why Japan Matters!, vol. 2, edited by Joseph F. Kess and Helen Lansdowne (University of Victoria, 2005), pp. 519–573, 655–663.

His portrait was featured on the Series D 5000 yen note, printed from 1984 to 2004.

The Nitobe Memorial Garden at the University of British Columbia in Vancouver, British Columbia, Canada, is named in his honour. A second memorial garden has been built at the Royal Jubilee Hospital in Victoria, British Columbia, Canada

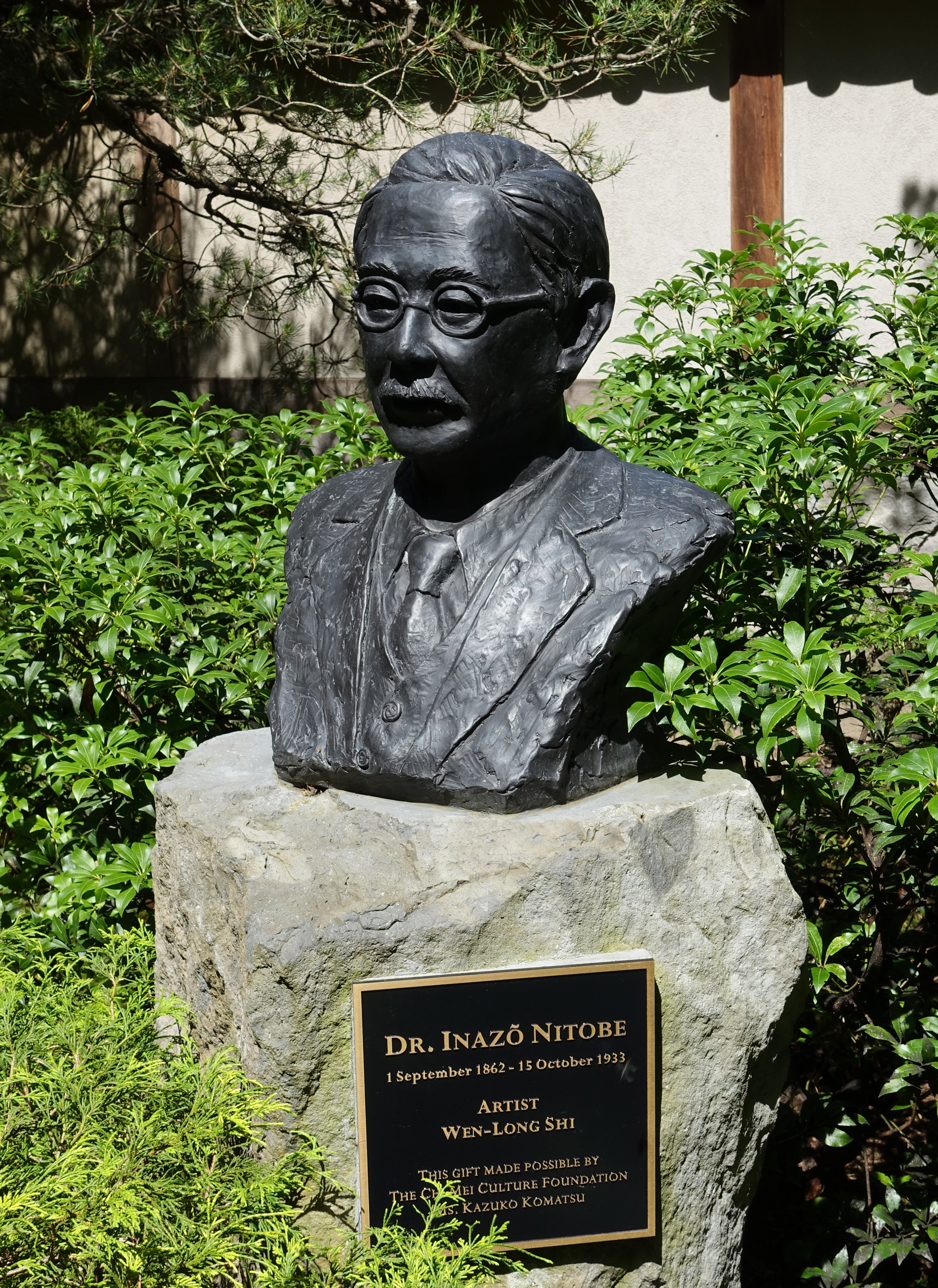
A Bust of Nitobe at the University of British Columbia
