= Fukubara Sadatoshi =

Japanese samurai

- 福原 貞俊
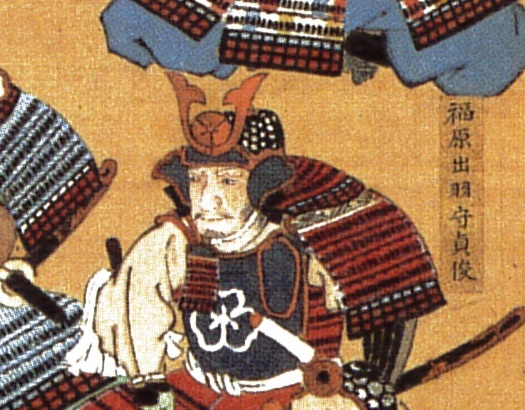
- Born: 1512; Aki Province
- Died: September 5, 1593 (aged 80–81); Aki Province
- Military career
- Allegiance: Mōri clan
- Unit: Fukubara Clan
- Commands: Suzuo Castle; Gassantoda Castle
- Conflicts: Battle of Miyajima (1555); Siege of Katsuyama Castle (1557); Siege of Chōfukuji temple (1557)

Fukubara Sadatoshi (福原 貞俊; 1512 – September 5, 1593) was a Japanese samurai and the 11th head of the Fukubara clan during the Sengoku period. He was a maternal cousin of Mōri Motonari. Following the death of Motonari, Sadatoshi became one of the Goyonin who supported Mōri Terumoto along with Kikkawa Motoharu, Kobayakawa Takakage and Kuchiba Michiyoshi.

The Fukubara clan had been an important retainer of the Mōri clan since the daughter of Fukubara Hirotoshi, the eighth head of the Fukubara clan, married Mōri Hiromoto and gave birth to Mōri Motonari in 1497.

Fukubara Sadatoshi participated in the Battle of Miyajima in 1555, which helped liberate the Mōri clan from control of the Ouchi clan.

In 1557 by order of Motonari, Sadatoshi led the force that encircled Katsuyama Castle and later surrounded Chōfukuji Temple and forced Ōuchi Yoshinaga to commit seppuku.
