= Kagamiyama Castle (Higashihiroshima) =

- 鏡山城
- Higashihiroshima, Hiroshima, Japan
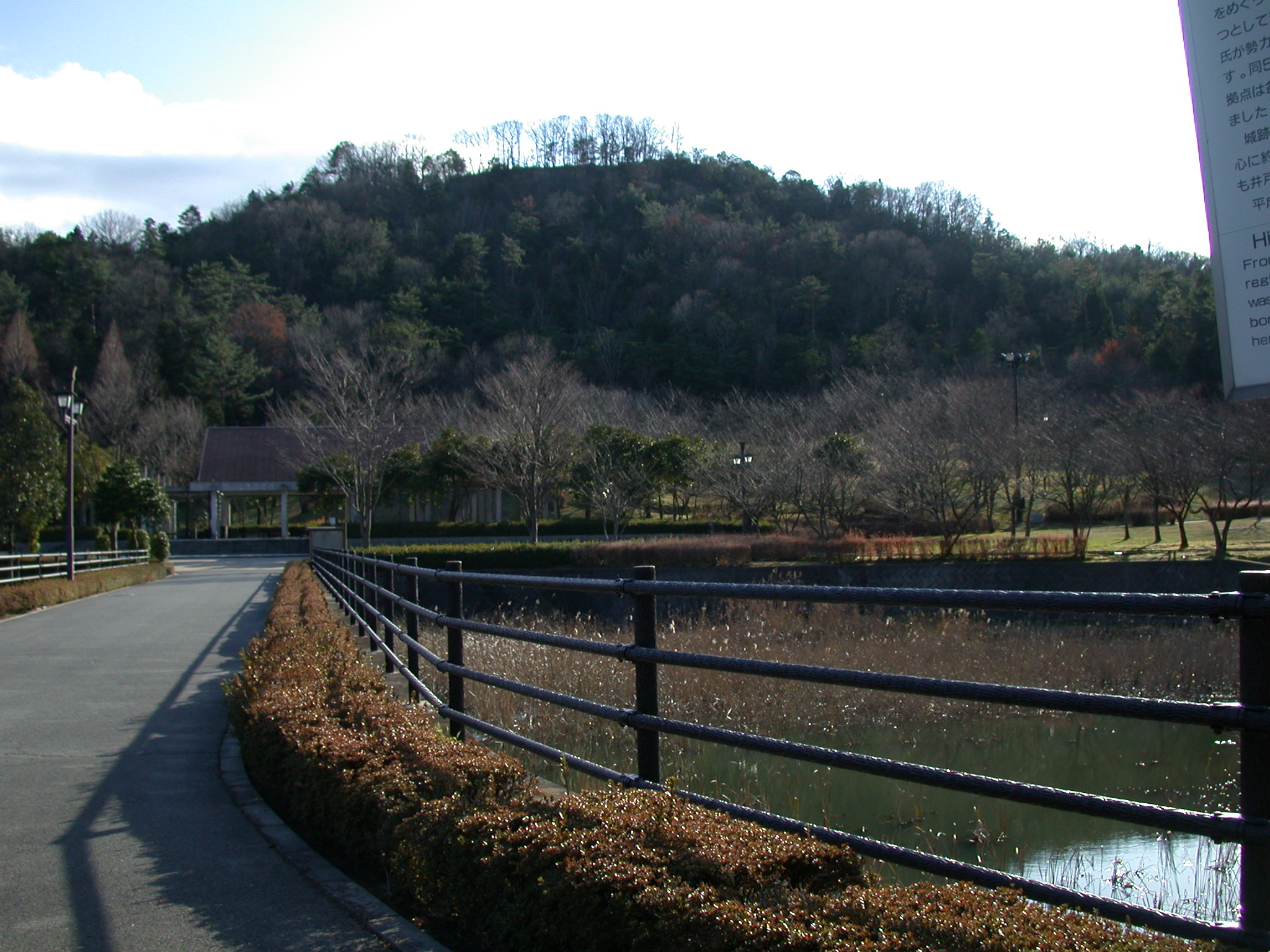
- Mount Kagami

Site information
- Type: yamashiro-style Japanese castle
- Condition: ruins

Location
- Kagamiyama Castle Kagamiyama Castle (Japan)
- Coordinates: 34°24′13.21″N 132°43′38.4″E

Site history
- Built: Nanboku-chō period
- Built by: Ouchi clan
- Demolished: 1525
- National Historic Site of Japan

Kagamiyama Castle (鏡山城, Kagamiyama-jō) was a yamajiro-style Japanese castle located in what is today part of the city of Higashihiroshima in Hiroshima Prefecture. Its ruins have been protected by the central government as a National Historic Site since 1957.

== History ==
Kagamiyama Castle is located on a 100-meter hilltop near the center of the Saijō Basin, approximately ten kilometers east from current Hiroshima city center. This area was the center of ancient Aki Province before the development of Hiroshima in the Edo Period.

The early history of Kagamiyama Castle is uncertain, but it appears to have been constructed by the Ouchi clan of Suo Province as their eastern stronghold. It first appears in historical documentation in the late Nanboku-chō period in a letter dated to the Kanshō era (1460-1465).

In 1467, the Onin War began between the Hosokawa clan and the Yamana clan, and Aki Province became a contested area. The Ouchi initially supported the Yamana and appointed their retainers, the Sue clan as castellan of Kagamiyama Castle. The castle changed hands several times, but it was considered by the Ouchi as a critical stronghold on their eastern borders. Although the Hosokawa clan eventually defeated the Yamana, the Hosokawa split into rival factions, and Hosokawa Takakuni turned to the Ouchi for assistance. In 1507, Ouchi Yoshioki landed in Kyoto with a large army, and placed Hosokawa Takakuni into power. Yoshioki fought against Hosokawa Sumimoto and his retainer, the Miyoshi clan, and kept the government of Takakuni in power for ten years; however, this long campaign resulted in discontent by retainers of Ouchi clan, especially in Bingo and Aki Provinces. Seeing an opportunity, Amago Tsunehisa of Izumo Province invaded. Ouchi Yoshitoki returned to face this threat, but by this time Mōri Motonari along with the Kikkawa clan had defected to the Amago. Amago Tsunehisa ordered Mōri Motonari to capture Kagamiyama Castle. He did so during the Battle of Kagamiyama Castle in 1525 by urging a relative of the commander of the castle to defect; but when Amago Tsunehisa ordered the defector to be executed, Mōri Motonari broke relations with the Amago in 1525 and thereafter the two clans were enemies. Ouchi Yoshioki recovered Kagamiyama Castle from the Amago, but by this time the clan had completed Tsuchiyama Castle at the western edge of Saijō Basin at higher elevation than Kagamiyama as their new defensive line, and Kagamiyama Castle was thereafter abandoned.

Currently, the site is maintained as a park. Although no structures have survived, the remains of large flat enclosures and collapsed stone walls, wells, earthen walls, and vertical moats indicate the scale and design of the castle. the site is about ten minutes by car from Saijō Station on the JR West San'yō Main Line.

== See also ==
- List of Historic Sites of Japan (Hiroshima)

== Literature ==
- De Lange, William (2021). An Encyclopedia of Japanese Castles. Groningen: Toyo Press. pp. 600 pages. ISBN 978-9492722300.
- Sansom, George (1961). A History of Japan: 1334–1615. Stanford, California: Stanford University Press
- Turnbull, Stephen (1998). The Samurai Sourcebook. London: Cassell & Co.
