= Mōri Motonari =

Daimyō of western Honshu (1497–1571)

- 毛利 元就
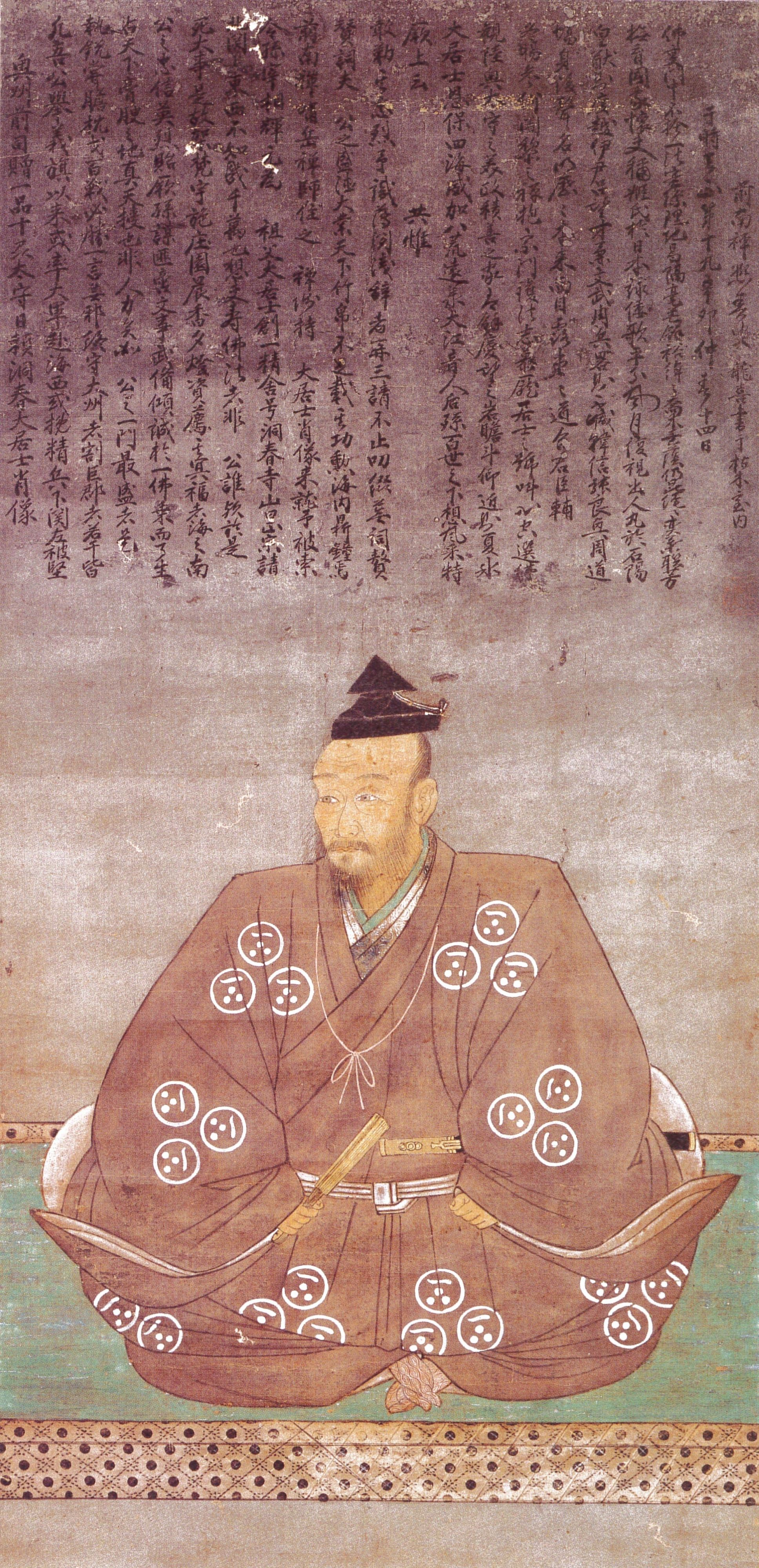

Head of Mōri clan
- In office July 1523 – 1557
- Preceded by: Mōri Kōmatsumaru
- Succeeded by: Mōri Takamoto

Personal details
- Born: Shōjumaru (松寿丸); April 16, 1497 Suzuo Castle, Aki
- Died: July 6, 1571 (aged 74) Yoshida-Kōriyama Castle, Aki
- Children: Mōri Takamoto; Kikkawa Motoharu; Kobayakawa Takakage; and others (see below)
- Parents: Mōri Hiromoto (father); Fukubara Hirotoshi's daughter (mother)
- Nickname: "Beggar Prince" (乞食若殿)

Military service
- Allegiance: Imperial House of Japan; Amago clan (1522–1525); Ōuchi clan (1525–1554)
- Years of service: Mōri clan (1523–1571) "Retired": (1546, 1557)
- Rank: Daimyō (Lord); Ju go-i-no-ge (従五位下); Ju shi-i-no-jō (従四位上); Jibu-shō (治部少輔); Mutsu-no-kami (陸奥守); Ju san-mi (従三位); Shō ichi-i (正一位)
- Unit: Mōri clan
- Commands: Yoshida-Kōriyama Castle
- Battles/wars: Battle of Arita-Nakaide (1517); Siege of Kagamiyama (1523); Siege of Yoshida-Kōriyama Castle (1540-1541); 1st siege of Toda Castle (1542-1543); Battle of Oshikibata (1554); Battle of Miyajima (1555); 2nd siege of Toda Castle (1564-1566); Siege of Tachibana (1569); Battle of Tatarahama (1569)

Mōri Motonari (毛利 元就; April 16, 1497 – July 6, 1571) was a prominent daimyō (feudal lord) in the western Chūgoku region of Japan during the Sengoku period of the 16th century. The Mōri clan claimed descent from Ōe no Hiromoto, an adviser to Minamoto no Yoritomo. Motonari was known as the "Beggar Prince" due to his relative lack of wealth and power at the start of his career. He was known as a great strategist who began as a small local warlord (jizamurai) of Aki Province and extended his clan's power to nearly all of the Chūgoku region through war, marriage, adoption and assassination.

Sandwiched between the powerful Amago and Ōuchi clans, Motonari led his clan by carefully balancing actions and diplomacy. Eventually, Motonari succeeded in defeating both and controlled the entire Chūgoku region. In his later years, he crushed the Ōtomo clan of Bungo Province in Kyūshū. Motonari ruled from Yoshida-Kōriyama Castle, the clan's main bastion since the early 14th century. His descendants became lords of the Chōshū Domain.

== Early life ==
Mōri Motonari was born on April 16, 1497, under the childhood name Shōjumaru (松寿丸) in a small domain of Aki Province. He was the second son of his father, Mōri Hiromoto. His mother was a daughter of Fukubara Hirotoshi, but her name is unknown. His birthplace is said to be Suzuo Castle, the base of the Fukubara clan and his mother's home. Today, there are stone monuments at the ruins of Suzuo Castle to commemorate the birthplace of Motonari at the castle.

In 1500, his father was involved in a power dispute with the Ashikaga shogunate and the Ōuchi clan and decided to retire. He handed over the head position of the clan to his eldest son, Mōri Okimoto and moved to Tajihi-Sarugake Castle with his son Shōjumaru. Okimoto then took over Yoshida-Kōriyama Castle, the main stronghold of the clan.

History remembers the young Mōri Shōjumaru as a fearless daredevil. It is said he escaped by night with some other children from his father's castle and met lord Amago Tsunehisa and his troops. Shōjumaru thought they were the ghosts of the Heike clan samurai, and so tried to become famous with a ghost hunt, a practice favored for the education of the youth of buke families. And so, Shōjumaru came openly to challenge the mounted warrior who looked to him like the general of the troops. It was Tsunehisa. The other children were trembling in fear, but not Shōjumaru. The young lord shot an arrow at the veteran lord. Tsunehisa swiftly caught it with his bare hand. Impressed by the bravery of his young opponent, Tsunehisa spared the boys, looking forward to battle against an adult Motonari.

The following year in 1501 his mother died and in 1506 his father died due to alcohol poisoning. Shōjumaru stayed at Tajihi-Sarugake Castle but his vassal Inoue Motomori (井上元盛) began embezzling land and was turned out of the castle. Because he was now both impoverished and from a powerful family he was called the "Beggar Prince" (乞食若殿) by the common people. The young Shōjumaru was raised by a foster mother Sugi no Ōkata (杉大方), who was a great influence on him; they grew very close. She got him in the habit facing the sun and saying a Buddhist prayer every morning.

In 1511, Shōjumaru officially became an adult and had his genpuku ceremony. He received the name Mōri Motonari (毛利元就).

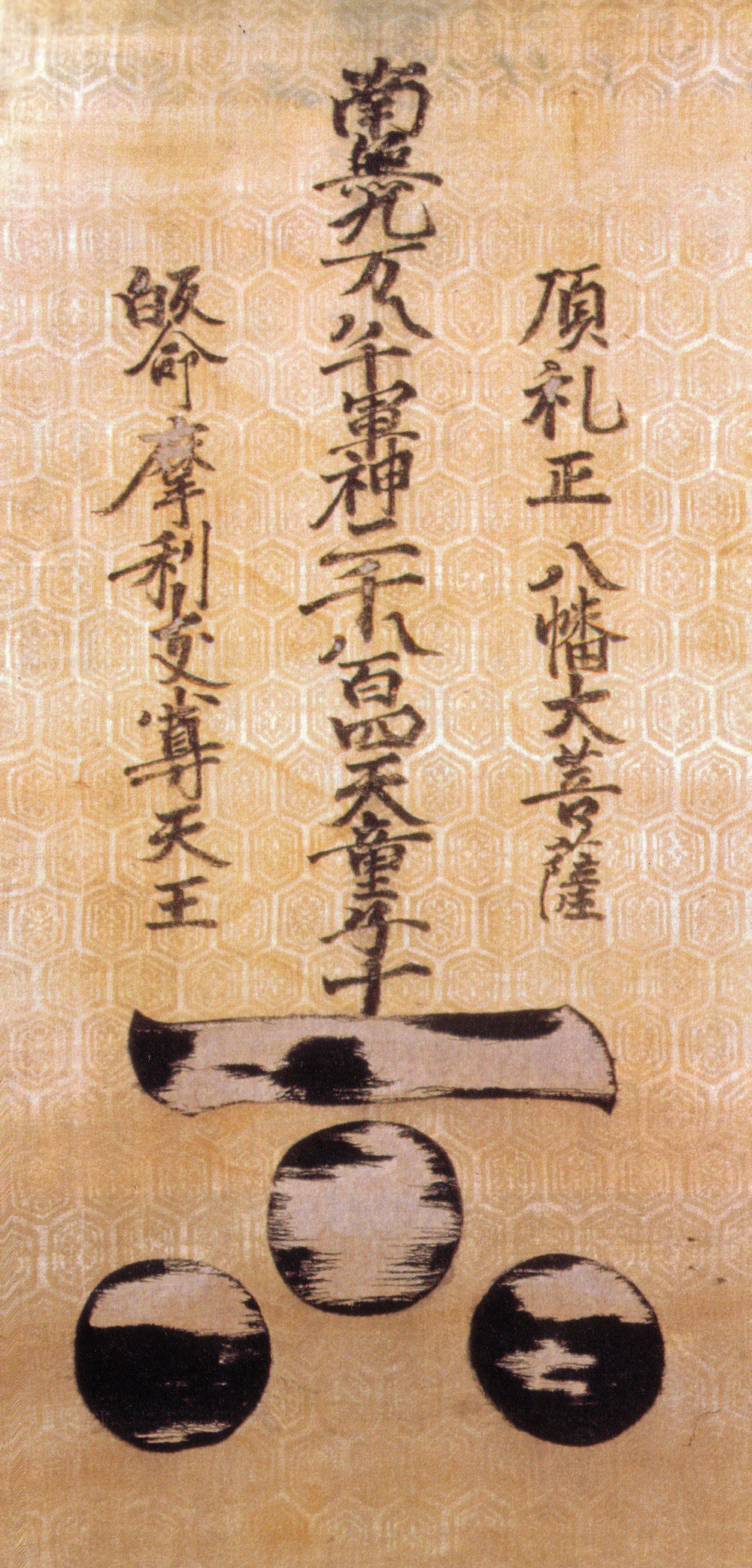
Mōri Motonari's battle standard, housed at the Mōri Museum

In 1516, his brother Okimoto died suddenly like their father due to alcohol poisoning. Okimoto's infant son, Kōmatsumaru (幸松丸) succeeded as head of the clan and Motonari became his regent.

After the sudden deaths of his father and brother the Mōri clan was left weak and vulnerable. The most powerful lord of the region, Takeda Motoshige (武田元繁) of Satoukanayama Castle (佐東銀山城), took advantage of the situation and gathered an army of 5,000 and in October, 1517 advanced into the territory of the Mōri's Kikkawa clan allies surrounding Arita Castle (有田城). A few weeks later, Motoshige dispatched a raid into the Mōri clan's territory and set fire to houses in Tajihi (多治比). Motonari went in place of his nephew Kōmatsumaru to relieve Arita Castle from the advancing Takeda forces. This was Motonari's first battle that would decide the fate of the Mōri clan and would become known as the Battle of Arita-Nakaide.

=== Battle of Arita-Nakaide ===
With most of the Ōuchi clan forces preoccupied in Kyoto with Ōuchi Yoshioki, the Mōri were unable to call on them for assistance, and Motonari instead mobilized his clan and called on their supporters. Motonari was also aided by his younger brother, Aiō Mototsuna. In total the Mōri strength comprised around 850 men, reinforced by 300 from the Kikkawa clan, for a total of around 1,000. This force marched towards Arita Castle and on the way encountered the Takeda vanguard, commanded by Kumagai Motonao (熊谷元直), commanding about 500 men. The Mōri and their allies stood off and engaged the Takeda with archery fire. Kumagai Motonao was in the front ranks and was encouraging his men when he was struck and killed by an arrow. Takeda Motoshige was meanwhile with the main army at Arita Castle. Learning of Motonao's demise, he drew up his forces and marched to engage the smaller Mōri resistance. The Takeda encountered the Mōri and Kikkawa occupying the opposite bank of the Uchikawa River (又打川) and a bitter struggle ensued. Heavily outnumbered, the Mōri-led forces began to falter and fall back, rallying only when Motonari pleaded with them to stand their ground. Takeda Motoshige himself advanced across the river on horseback but was struck by an arrow and killed. The Takeda broke and retreated, leaving Mōri Motonari the victor. The battle was the start of the decline of the Aki-Takeda clan and the start of the military expansion of the Mōri. Mōri Motonari's name finally became known in the country.

=== Service under Amago clan ===
In 1518 Amago Tsunehisa made a series of raids into the Ōuchi clan's lands, falling back with the return of Ōuchi Yoshioki from Kyōto. In 1521 a formal peace treaty was signed between the two clans but it lasted but one year. Also sometime around 1522, Motonari married the daughter of Kikkawa Kunitsune (吉川国経) the lord of Ogurayama Castle; this match would not only secure the friendship of the Kikkawa clan but would in time produce three fine sons. This was an important alliance as the Kikkawa were powerful in Aki Province and their land lay directly to the north of Yoshida, the Mōri heartland on the border with Iwami Province. Motonari had thus already extended his influence north in the direction of the silver-rich Iwami Ginzan Silver Mine and south towards the Inland Sea.

In 1522, Tsunehisa marched into Aki Province, forcing Motonari, whose lands sat directly in the Amago's path, to submit. Motonari was immediately dispatched against Kagamiyama Castle (鏡山城) while Tsunehisa himself struck at Kanayama Castle (金山城). Tsunehisa made no progress against Kanayama and retreated, but Motonari was eventually successful at the Battle of Kagamiyama Castle (鏡山城の戦) in 1523. Motonari had problems taking the castle because the lord of Kagamiyama Castle, Kurata Fusanobu (蔵田房信), put up a strong fight, so Motonari persuaded his uncle Kurata Naonobu (蔵田直信) to betray the castle. After the battle Motonari tried to save Naonobu but Amago Tsunehisa executed him for his shameful and disloyal act. It may be that Tsunehisa became aware of Motonari's talent and wary of his expansion, for from then on a rift would grow between Tsunehisa and Motonari.

== Rise ==
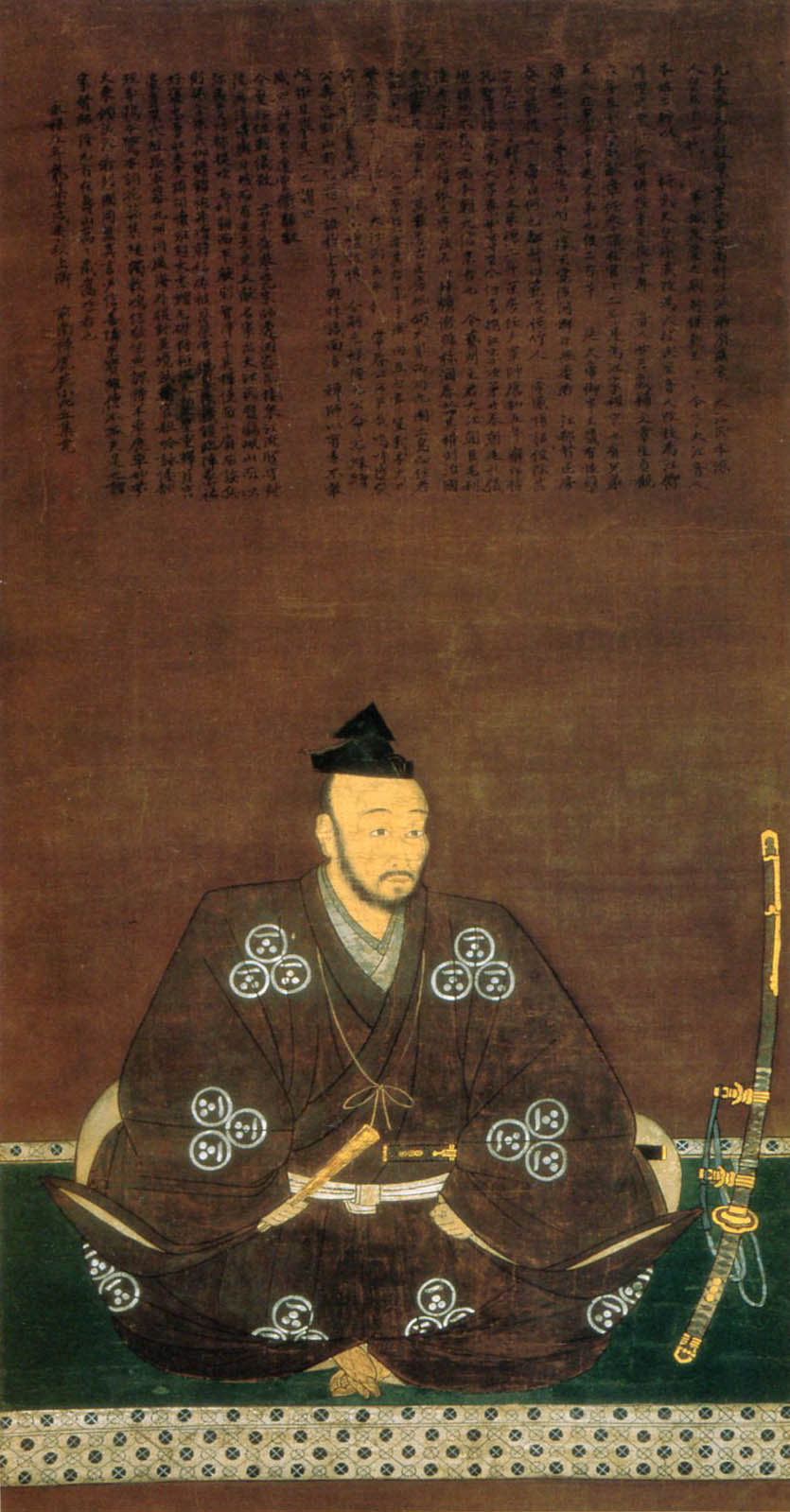
Full portrait of Motonari

=== Leadership of the Mōri clan ===
In July 1523, Motonari's nephew Kōmatsumaru, the titular head of the clan, died suddenly at the age of nine. The senior Mōri vassals met and decided to offer the leadership to Motonari and on August 10 he entered Yoshida-Kōriyama Castle as its new lord. However, some among the senior vassals dissented from the decision and in 1524 any sense of security was broken when Mōri suffered the defection of his vassal Katsura Hirozumi, and was forced to defeat the traitor in open battle not far from Yoshida-Kōriyama Castle. Also in 1524, Motonari learned of a conspiracy led by a vassal, Sakagami Sosuke, to murder him and elevate his half-brother Aiō Mototsuna to the leadership. The rebellion was crushed at Funayama Castle in April.

=== Service under Ōuchi clan ===
Along with the family troubles concerning succession, Motonari and Amago Tsunehisa gradually grew hostile towards one another. In March 1525 Motonari and several other local lords decided to change allegiance to Ōuchi Yoshioki. In June, Yoshioki sent his army to Kagamiyama Castle and took it from the Amago clan. Considering Kagamiyama's weak defenses on a low hill, Yoshioki built a new castle called Tsuchiyama Castle at the western edge of Saijo Basin on a high mountain and demolished Kagamiyama.

In 1529 Yoshioki died and was succeeded by his son Ōuchi Yoshitaka. Amago Tsunehisa began negotiating with Takahashi Okimitsu (高橋興光), a maternal relative of the late Mōri Kōmatsumaru who had earlier schemed to place Motonari's brother, Aiō Mototsuna, as head of the Mōri clan. Motonari acted quickly and crushed the Takahashi clan, taking their vast territory from Aki Province to Iwami Province. He paid a high price for the conquest, however, because Motonari's eldest daughter had been a political hostage of the Takahashi clan and was murdered by them in revenge.

A rebellion broke out against the Ōuchi clan in 1532; in response, thirty-two vassals presented Motonari with an oath in which they sought a guarantee that he would not require them to give up their status as small-scale lords, in return for which they promised to jointly undertake the repair of walls and irrigation ditches and the disciplining of traitorous vassals.

On September 25, 1533, Motonari was granted the imperial court rank of the Junior Fifth, Lower Grade in remembrance of his ancestor Ōe no Hiromoto's title. Ōuchi Yoshitaka approved of this and paid the stipend for the position. Although this place at court had become only a sinecure, Motonari nevertheless demonstrated to the other lords in Aki Province that he had the backing of both the imperial court and the Ōuchi clan.

=== Consolidation of Mōri's holdings ===
In 1534, Motonari began consolidating the Mōri's holdings in Aki, gathering local allies, chief among these being the Shishido, Kumagai, and Amano. He also married one of his daughters to Shishido Takaie (宍戸隆家). In 1535, Tagayama Castle (多賀山城) surrendered to Motonari. Over the next twelve months Motonari defeated the Miya and Tagayama clans. Motonari also made ties with his former enemies, the Aki-Takeda clan and Kumagai clan, creating a strong network of power. By the end of the decade the Ōuchi and Amago families began to see the Mōri with new respect and suspicion. The Amago clearly would not have any faith in Motonari as he had betrayed them and defeated their allies. The Ōuchi were also growing suspicious of the Mōri's growing power, so in 1537, Motonari's eldest son Mōri Takamoto was given as a political hostage to the Ōuchi clan to strengthen their relationship. He would stay until 1540.

In 1539 Ōuchi Yoshitaka fought the Ōtomo clan and Shōni clan of northern Kyūshū, defeating the Shōni clan to win control of the area. In the same year, Sato-Kanayama Castle (佐東銀山城) owned by the Takeda clan on the Amago side fell to the Ōuchi clan despite reinforcements from the Amago clan. The family head Takeda Nobuzane (武田信実) escaped to Wakasa (若狭) where the Takeda had a branch family and later took refuge with the Amago clan.

=== Siege of Yoshida-Kōriyama Castle ===
Amago Tsunehisa had nominally retired and turned over the leadership of the clan to his grandson, Haruhisa (also known as Akihisa). Amago Haruhisa conceived of a plan to destroy Mōri Motonari and bring Aki province under the sway of the Amago. When a council of the Amago retainers was called to discuss the planned campaign, almost all spoke in favor of the attack. Amago Hisayuki, however, considered the risks to be too great and spoke out against it, but was derided by Amago Tsunehisa as a coward and publicly humiliated. Amago Hisayuki was given the task of harrying the Mōri's ally, the Shishido clan in Aki, as part of an initial and concurrent operation of the larger Amago campaign into Aki. Amago Haruhisa, with 30,000 men, attacked Motonari's main base, Yoshida-Kōriyama Castle, which was defended by 8,000 men.

The initial phase of the campaign began in June 1540. Amago Hisayuki, his son Amago Masahisa and his nephew Kunihisa led their troops to attack the domain of Motonari's ally, the Shishido clan. This foray had little effect except to deny Haruhisa of some of his most capable generals and soldiers for the attack on Yoshida-Kōriyama Castle.

In August, Amago Haruhisa gathered a force of 30,000 and departed Izumo Province, moving into the vicinity of Motonari's Yoshida-Kōriyama Castle and establishing a headquarters nearby. Meanwhile, Motonari had evacuated over 5,000 of Yoshida's citizens inside the walls of Yoshida-Kōriyama Castle, which was defended by around 3,000 soldiers. By this time urgent requests for aid had been dispatched to the Ōuchi in Suo Province. Two days after arriving, the Amago launched an attack on Yoshida-Kōriyama Castle, which continued for several months. The Ōuchi relief army, consisting of 10,000 men led by Sue Takafusa, finally departed Suō Province in November, pausing on Miyajima to offer prayers for victory at the Itskushima Shrine before landing in Aki and marching towards Yoshida-Kōriyama Castle. They arrived outside Yoshida-Kōriyama Castle in December 1540, four months after the siege had begun. A series of skirmishes ensued between the opposing armies into the following month (January, 1541), which was largely to the detriment of the Amago. Motonari successfully defended his castle from an attack by Amago Haruhisa in the 1540–41 Siege of Yoshida-Kōriyama Castle.

In the meantime, the other Amago force under Amago Hisayuki that had been dispatched to threaten the Shishido arrived. Its headquarters on Tenjinyama (天神山) were attacked by the Mōri and Ōuchi. In the ensuing action Amago Hisayuki was killed by an arrow and the Amago suffered heavy losses. In the wake of this fight, the Amago retainers, noting the army's dwindling supplies and poor morale, elected to retreat. The Mōri and Ōuchi duly pursued but were hindered by snow.

The same year (1540), they attacked the Amago retainer Takeda Nobuzane (武田信実) who had been hiding with the Amago clan at Sato-Ginzan Castle. Nobuzane fled to Izumo Province and the Aki-Takeda clan was utterly annihilated. In addition, Motonari took over the Kawachi Keigoshu (川内警固衆), a pirate organization owned by the Aki-Takeda clan, which would become a large part of the Mōri navy later.

=== First siege of Toda castle ===
From 1542 to 1543 Motonari followed Ōuchi Yoshitaka in the First Siege of Toda Castle. In this battle they penetrated deep into the Amago clan territory but their supply line was broken and Kikkawa Okitsune (吉川興経) betrayed them. Motonari surrounded Gassantoda Castle (富田城) but the Ōuchi troops retreated. During the retreat Motonari almost lost his life but his general Watanabe Hajime covered Motonari's escape with a heroic rearguard action. Motonari returned safely to Aki Province. As a result of the battle the power of the Ōuchi clan weakened.

=== Extended Mōri clan power ===
In 1544 Motonari gave his third son, Tokujumaru (徳寿丸), for adoption to the Numata branch of the Kobayakawa clan (沼田小早川氏) who were famous for their naval forces. Tokujumaru later became known as Kobayakawa Takakage. This same year Amago Haruhisa's expeditionary force attacked the Miyoshi clan in Bingo Province. Motonari dispatched generals Kodama Naritada and Fukubara Sadatoshi against Haruhisa but they were forced to retreat.

Motonari lost his wife Myōkyū in 1545 and, crying, he did not emerge from his room for three days. Motonari then announced that he intended to enter retirement in 1546 and hand over the leadership of the Mōri to his son Mōri Takamoto. However, it was understood by all that Motonari was still the true head of the clan wielding all the power.

In 1547 Motonari sent his second son, Shōnojirō (少輔次郎), to be adopted by the Kikkawa clan which was his deceased wife Myōkyū's family. Shōnojirō would become known as Kikkawa Motoharu. The head of the clan, Kikkawa Okitsune (吉川興経), was a rival of Motonari who had allied himself with the Amago clan in the 1540s. Motonari responded by pressuring Okitsune to adopt his son Motoharu and in 1550 Okitsune was compelled to retire, later being killed on Motonari's orders by Kumagai Nobunao. Kikkawa Tsuneyo (吉川経世), who was the uncle of Okitsune stayed on as a retainer of the Mōri. In 1550 Motoharu entered the Kikkawa clan's main castle as its lord.

Motonari also intervened in the succession of the Kobayakawa clan. His son, Kobayakawa Takakage was already head of one branch of the clan, the Numata. The other branch, the Takehara, had lost their clan head Kobayakawa Masahira (小早川正平) at the Siege of Toda Castle and the new head of the clan, Kobayakawa Shigehira (小早川繁平) was young and blind from an eye illness. In 1550, with the backing of Motonari, Takakage also became head of the Takehara branch, merging the two branches of the clan. With this action the armed retainers of both branches became Motonari's to command.

In 1549 Motonari went down to Yamaguchi with his sons Motoharu and Takakage. Ōuchi Yoshitaka's vassals Sagara Taketō and Sue Takafusa were engaged in a dispute over the future of the Ōuchi clan. After his defeat at the siege of Toda Castle, Ōuchi Yoshitaka had grown tired of fighting battles and had retreated to work with literature and the arts. Motonari was sick during his stay in Yamaguchi and it took him three months to return to Yoshida-Kōriyama Castle. His caretaker while he was sick was Inoue Mitsutoshi (井上光俊). Inoue Motokane (井上元兼) was the son of Inoue Mitsukane (井上光兼) and the de facto head of a notable Aki family that nominally served the Mōri clan. He held Tenjinyama (天神山), which was just to the south of Motonari's Yoshida-Kōriyama Castle. As Motokane grew more powerful militarily and economically, he began to test the leadership of Motonari, who he became openly critical of. In 1550 Motonari forced Motokane and many members of his household to commit suicide on the grounds of treasonous behavior, an act that secured the Mōri as Aki's most powerful family. The Inoue family were afterwards allowed to continue on as Mōri retainers. Motonari's previous caretaker in Yamaguchi, Inoue Mitsutoshi, escaped the purge.

At this point Motonari now had Iwami Province with the Kikkawa clan, Bingo Province, Seto Inland Sea with the Kobayakawa clan and with the two forces nearly dominated the whole of Aki Province.

== Conflict with Ouchi ==
=== Tainei-ji incident ===
In 1551, Sue Takafusa revolted against his lord Ōuchi Yoshitaka in the Tainei-ji incident, forcing him to commit seppuku. Takafusa changed his name to Harukata on this occasion and installed the next lord of the clan, Ōuchi Yoshinaga, but effectively led the Ōuchi clan and its armies, intent on military expansion. In 1554, Mōri Motonari became the leader of the Mōri clan. As a vassal of the Ōuchi clan, he wanted to avenge the betrayed Yoshitaka, and so he rebelled against Sue, whose territorial ambitions were depleting clan resources.

The Sue gathered a large army of as many as 30,000 men. Motonari, while stronger than ever, could scarcely muster half that. Nonetheless, he fared well in the early stages of their conflict, defeating Sue troops at the Battle of Oshikibata in June. By using what had already become hallmark Mōri trickery and by bribing a number of Sue's men, Motonari managed to balance out the odds somewhat. For his part, Sue made no major moves against Koriyama, and with the end of the year's campaigning season, Motonari was allowed some breathing space.

=== Battle of Miyajima ===
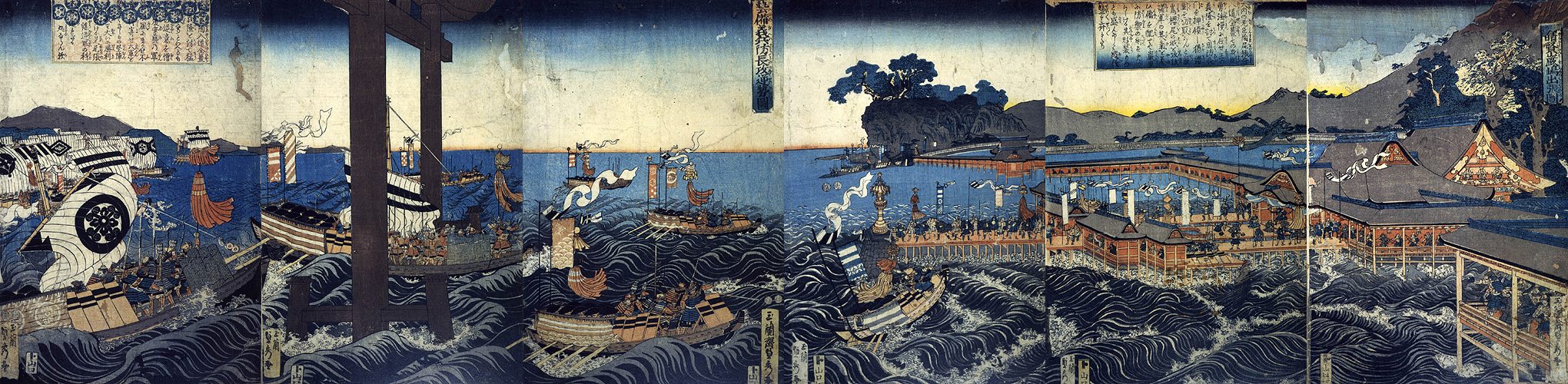
Scroll depicting the invasion by Mōri forces (c. 1855)

In the early summer of 1555, Sue was again threatening, and Motonari was hard-pressed. Harukata was by no means a poor fighter, and the danger of Motonari's retainers and allies deserting the Mōri led him to adopt a bold and unorthodox scheme. His plan involved Miyajima, home to the Itsukushima Shrine and a place combatants had traditionally avoided on religious grounds. Mōri's generals had suggested the occupation of Miyajima, which was strategically located just off the Aki coast in the Inland Sea, but Motonari had refused the idea on tactical grounds. For Miyajima to be a viable base of operations, Sakurao Castle – the nearest fort on the mainland to Miyajima – would also have to be held. Should Sakurao fall, any army on Miyajima risked being isolated. Yet Mōri's own insight into the weakness of the Miyajima position led him to form a plan in which he would lure Sue into this exact trap. Naturally, such a tactic would require Sue's unwitting cooperation, and for inducement, Motonari immediately gave orders that Miyajima was to be occupied. A fort, Miyao Castle, was thrown up quite near the Itsukushima shrine and Motonari proclaimed publicly his woe that it would not hold out long against an attack. In September, Sue fell into the trap. He landed with the bulk of his army on Miyajima and assaulted the (intentionally) thin defenses of Miyao Castle. When the island had been secured (including the capture of Sakurao), Sue threw up a few fortifications on To-no-oka (Pagoda Hill) and sat down to plot strategy. From his point of view the capture of Miyajima was a strategic boon. From this secure springboard he could embark to almost any point along the Aki coast, as well as Bingo Province. Since the following autumn, Mōri had assumed a largely defensive posture, and Sue had some reason to feel comfortable in his new forward headquarters. Sue thus made his second great mistake – he became complacent.

Mōri put his strategy into effect. Within a week he retook Sakurao Castle and played his trump card – the Murakami pirates. Gathering the pirates' naval strength, he set out to surprise Sue on Miyajima, and picked a perfect night on which to do so. On October 1, after dark and in a driving thunderstorm, Motonari and his sons put to sea. So the Battle of Miyajima began. As a diversion, Kobayakawa Takakage sailed straight past the Sue positions on To-no-oka while Motonari, Mōri Takamoto, and Kikkawa Motoharu landed just to the east and out of sight. Takakage doubled back and landed at dawn, attacking the Sue forces practically in the shadow of Miyajima's great torii gate. Motonari then assaulted the confused Sue troops from behind, and the result was a rout for Sue Harukata, who committed suicide at Oenoura, a small island inlet. Many of his troops followed suit, and for Motonari, the battle was utterly decisive.

Motonari had annihilated the Sue who had aspired to take the place of the Ōuchi clan. While it would take the Mōri until 1557 to force Ōuchi Yoshinaga to commit suicide and years longer to completely bring Suo province and Nagato province under Mōri's control, Motonari was now the most powerful lord in western Japan.

In the same year 1557, Motonari once again announced his retirement and Takamoto inherited the formal leadership of the clan. Even after Motonari's retirement, he continued to wield actual control over the clan's affairs.

== Conflict with Amago ==
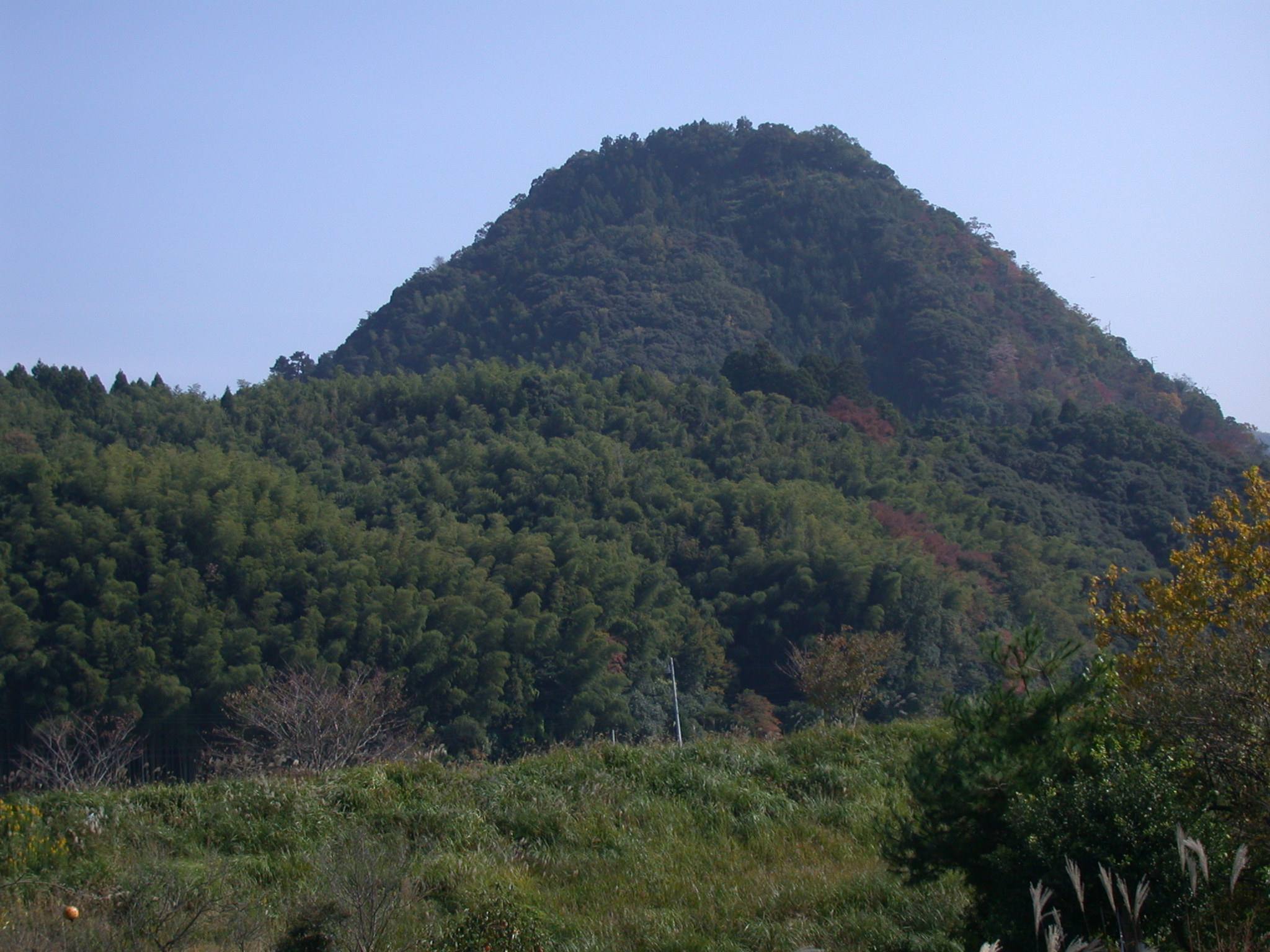
The mountaintop where Gassan Toda Castle used to stand

In 1554, Motonari's intrigues led to the death of Amago Kunihisa in battle with Amago Haruhisa. Kunihisa, the son of Amago Tsunehisa, led a faction named the Shingūtō (新宮党) after the town, Shingu, where it was based. He had been trusted with military matters by his father Tsunehisa but he often looked down upon those who did not do well on the battlefield and was obnoxious from time to time. Supposedly, Motonari tricked Haruhisa into believing that Kunihisa and Era Fusahide (江良房栄) intended to take over the Amago clan. The circumstances may have been aggravated by Kunihisa's arrogance towards young Haruhisa. The death of Kunihisa and the purge of the Shingūtō weakened the Amago clan considerably.

In 1556, Yamabuki Castle (山吹城) was captured by the leader of the Amago clan, Amago Haruhisa, and Motonari lost control of the Iwami Ginzan Silver Mine.

When Haruhisa died in 1560, his son, Amago Yoshihisa, succeeded as head of the Amago. The shōgun, Ashikaga Yoshiteru wished for peace between the Amago and Mōri clans, but Motonari ignored his plea and invaded Izumo Province in 1562. So began the second siege of Toda Castle.

=== Second siege of Toda castle ===
The second siege of Toda Castle lasted from 1562 to 1563. When Motonari attacked Amago Yoshihisa at Toda Castle, Yoshihisa executed his retainer, Moriyama Hisakane (宇山久兼), whom Yoshihisa feared would betray him. This caused most of his remaining troops to desert, and later Amago surrendered to Motonari. Yoshihisa was permitted to become a monk and was held captive at Enmei-ji. With the head of the Amago clan gone, the clan members were forced to serve as retainers to other daimyo. As a monk, Yoshihisa changed his name to Yurin (友林). After Mōri Terumoto became the head of Mōri clan, he became a retainer under Terumoto.

After defeating the Amago clan in Izumo Province, Motonari had become lord of eight provinces of the Chūgoku region. However, Amago Katsuhisa, son of Amago Masahisa (尼子誠久), led a remnant of the clan in rebellion with support from Yamanaka Yukimori.

Motonari's eldest son, Mōri Takamoto, while en route to attack the Amago clan in 1563, died of a sudden disease, though assassination by poison was suspected. Saddened and angered by his death, Motonari ordered all those whom he thought responsible to be punished.

In 1566, Takamoto's son and Motonari's grandson Mōri Terumoto was selected as Motonari's heir, but Motonari continued to wield the true power over the Mōri clan.

In 1570, Terumoto defeated Amago Katsuhisa at the Battle of Nunobeyama. Katsuhisa then fled to the Oki Islands. In 1578, Katsuhisa returned from the Oki Islands and captured Tajima and Inaba Provinces. He then occupied Kozuki Castle for Oda clan under Toyotomi Hideyoshi, and defended it against the Mōri clan. Later, he was attacked by Kobayakawa Takakage and Kikkawa Motoharu, defeated and forced to commit suicide.

== Conflict with Ōtomo ==
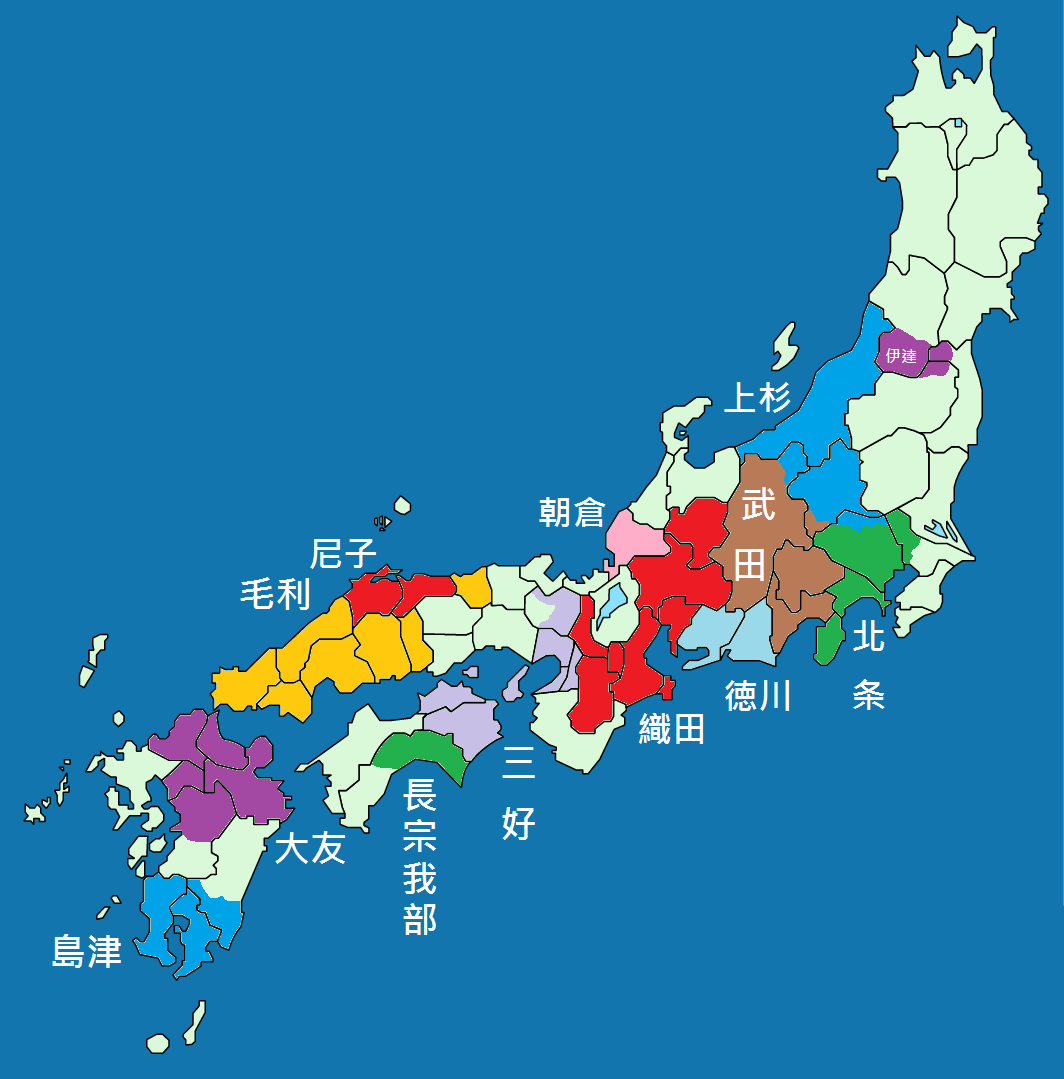
Japan in 1570 (the year before Motonari's death). The Mōri are depicted in orange.

After Ōuchi Yoshinaga, Otomo Sorin's younger brother, was forced to commit suicide by the advance of Mōri forces in 1557, Mōri Motonari captured Yoshinaga's Moji fortress in 1558. In response, Otomo Sorin recaptured the castle in September 1559, but the Mōri, led by Kobayakawa Takakage and Ura Munekatsu, quickly took the castle back. In 1561, forces under Ōtomo Sōrin attacked the Moji castle in alliance with the Portuguese trader, but the assault failed, and the castle finally remained in Mōri possession.

However, Motonari's advance against the Ōtomo was checked by the 1568 alliance between the Amago and Ōtomo clans. In 1569, Mōri Motonari led the assault on the Ōtomo clan's Tachibana castle which was held by Tachibana Dosetsu. Motonari won and captured the castle, but was driven back by Otomo Sorin in the Battle of Tatarahama that followed the siege. The battle of the Mōri clan with this larger allied force was part of Yamanaka Yukimori and Amago Katsuhisa's arrangement with Ōtomo. Motonari was distracted from his designs against the Ōtomo in Kyushu by his inability to defeat the Amago in Izumo province, some distance away in Honshu. As a result, he abandoned Tachibana castle and withdrew from his campaign against the Ōtomo.

== Death ==
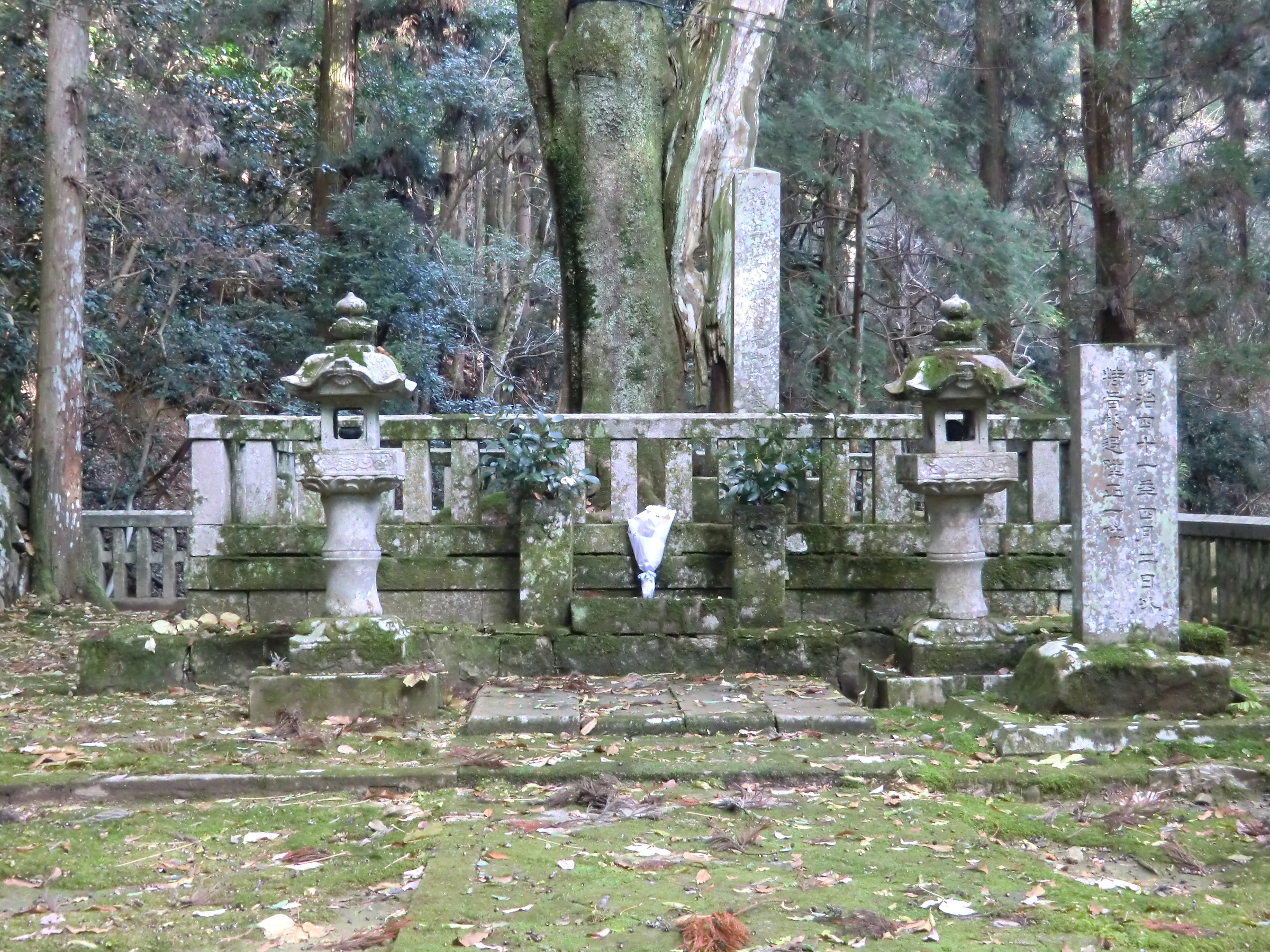
Mōri Motonari's tomb, near the ruins of Yoshida-Kōriyama Castle

Motonari had been suffering from illness during the first half of the 1560s so the shōgun, Ashikaga Yoshiteru, sent him his doctor, Manase Dōsan (曲直瀬道三), to treat him. It seems that his physical condition improved temporarily and in 1567 his last son, Kadokikumaru (才菊丸) was born, later known as Kobayakawa Hidekane.

Mōri Motonari died on June 14, 1571, at Yoshida-Kōriyama Castle at the age of 74. The cause of death is said to be both esophageal cancer and old age.

== Legacy ==
Motonari is remembered as one of the greatest Japanese warlords of the mid-16th century. Under his leadership the Mōri expanded from a few districts in Aki Province to rule over ten of the Chūgoku region's eleven provinces, and Motonari was known even in his day as a master of wiles and trickery, a warlord whose schemes won as many battles as his soldiers. He is best remembered for an event that probably never took place – the "lesson of the three arrows". In this Japanese version of the Aesopian fable The Old Man and his Sons, Motonari gives each of his sons an arrow to break. He then gives them three arrows bundled, and points out that while one may be broken easily, not so three united as one. The three sons were of course Takamoto, Motoharu, and Takakage, and the lesson is one that Japanese children still learn in school today. Motonari in fact had six other sons, two of whom appear to have died in childhood. The others included Motoaki, Motokiyo, Motomasa and (Kobayakawa) Hidekane.

Shiji Hiroyoshi, Kuchiba Michiyoshi, Kumagai Nobunao, Fukubara Sadatoshi, Katsura Motozumi, Kodama Naritada, Kokushi Motosuke, Hiraga Hirosuke, and Ichikawa Tsuneyoshi assisted Mōri Motonari in his rule. His greatest generals, however, were his own sons Kobayakawa Takakage and Kikkawa Motoharu, the 'Two Rivers' (a play on the 'kawa' characters in their names).

The well known "one line, three stars" emblem of the Mōri was inherited from the family's ancestor, Ōe no Hiromoto.

In addition to being a gifted general Motonari was also a noted poet and patron of the arts. Surviving letters written by his grandson Mōri Terumoto describe Motonari as a strict and demanding man with a sharp eye. He was succeeded by his grandson Terumoto, who was the son of the late Takamoto.

== Family ==
Mōri clan (mon)

In all, Motonari had nine sons and three daughters; five children were by his wife, three by a consort from the Nomi clan, and four by a consort from the Miyoshi clan.

There is also speculation that Ninomiya Naritoki (二宮就辰, 1546–1607) was Motonari's son with a woman from the Yada clan (矢田氏).

- Father: Mōri Hiromoto (毛利弘元, 1466–1506)
- Mother: name unknown, daughter of Fukubara Hirotoshi (福原広俊).
  - Brother: Mōri Okimoto (毛利興元, 1492–1516)
  - Brother: Aiō Mototsuna (相合元綱, d. 1524)
  - Brother: Kita Narikatsu (北就勝, d. 1557)
  - Brother: Mitsuke Motouji (見付元氏)
    - Wife: Lady Myōkyū (妙玖夫人, 1499–1546), daughter of Kikkawa Kunitsune (吉川国経).
      - 1st son: Mōri Takamoto (毛利隆元, 1523–1563)
        - Grandson: Mōri Terumoto (毛利輝元, 1553–1625)
      - 2nd son: Kikkawa Motoharu (吉川元春, 1530–1586)
      - 3rd son: Kobayakawa Takakage (小早川隆景, 1533–1597)
      - 1st daughter: name unknown, died young, taken hostage by the Takahashi clan (高橋氏) and later killed.
      - 2nd daughter: Lady Goryū (五龍局, d.1574), wife of Shishido Takaie (宍戸隆家).
    - Concubine: Nomi no Ōkata (乃美大方, d. 1601), daughter of Nomi Takaoki (乃美隆興).
      - 4th son: Hoida Motokiyo (穂井田元清, 1551–1597)
      - 7th son: Amano Motomasa (天野元政, 1559–1609)
      - 9th son: Kobayakawa Hidekane (小早川秀包, 1567–1601)
    - Concubine: name unknown, daughter of Miyoshi Masataka (三吉致高) of the Miyoshi clan.
      - 5th son: Suginomori Motoaki (椙杜元秋, 1552–1585)
      - 6th son: Izuha Mototomo (出羽元倶, 1555–1571)
      - 8th son: Suetsugu Motoyasu (末次元康, 1560–1601)
      - 3rd daughter: name unknown, wife of Uehara Motomasa (上原元将).

== Honours ==
- Junior Fifth Rank, Lower Grade (Ju go-i-no-ge, 従五位下), Aryō (右馬頭)
- Junior Fourth Rank, Upper Grade (Ju shi-i-no-jō, 従四位上), Aryō (右馬頭)
- Jibu-shō (治部少輔) - Second assistant to the Minister of Ceremonies
- Mutsu-no-kami (陸奥守)
- Junior Third Rank (ju san-mi, 従三位)
- Senior First Rank (shō ichi-i, 正一位) - April 2, 1908; posthumous

== The 18 Generals of Mōri (毛利十八将) ==
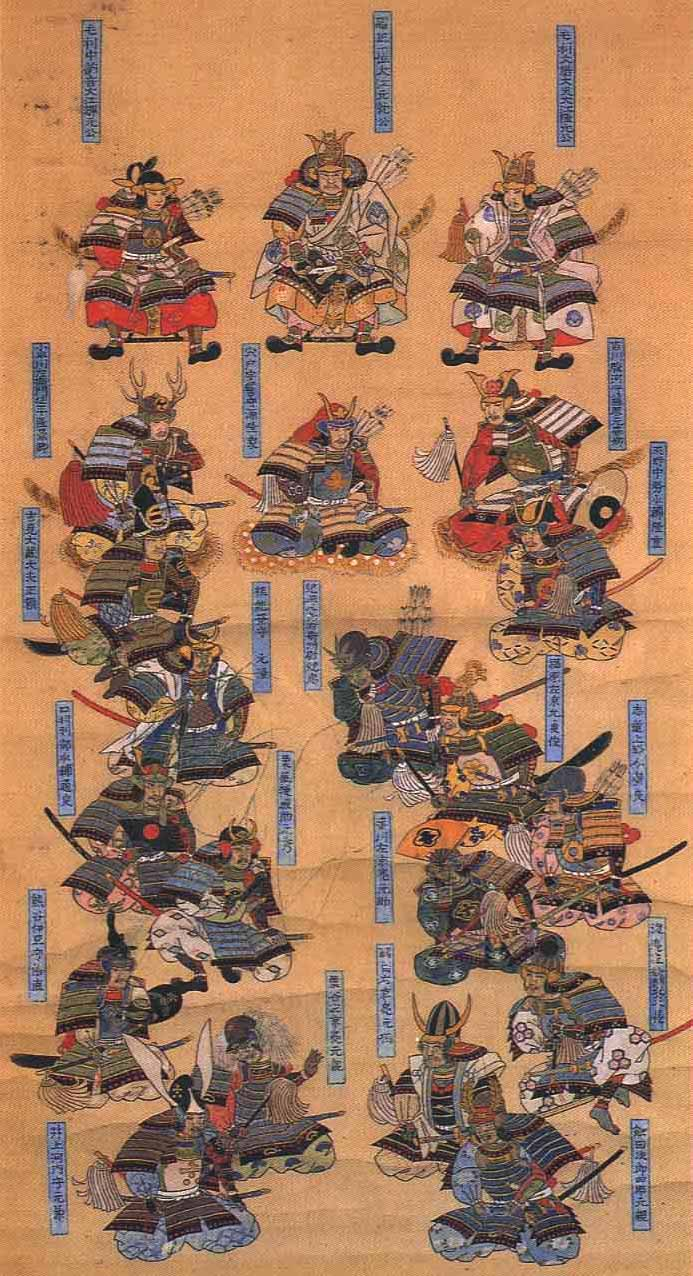
The 18 Generals of Mōri

- Kikkawa Motoharu (吉川元春, 1530–1586), second son of Motonari, with his brother they were known as "Mōri Ryōsen", or "Mōri's Two Rivers" (毛利両川).
- Kobayakawa Takakage (小早川隆景, 1533–1597), third son of Motonari, with his brother they were known as "Mōri Ryōsen", or "Mōri's Two Rivers" (毛利両川).
- Shishido Takaie (宍戸隆家, 1518–1592), married to one of Motonari's daughters, Goryū no Tsubone.
- Kuchiba Michiyoshi (口羽通良, 1513–1582), responsible for fighting in the San'in region and as an assistant to Kikkawa Motoharu.
- Fukubara Sadatoshi (福原貞俊, 1512–1593), maternal uncle of Motonari, son of Motonari's maternal grandfather, Fukubara Hirotoshi.
- Amano Takashige (天野隆重, 1503–1584), originally a vassal of the Ōuchi clan, switched to Motonari after the death of Ōuchi Yoshitaka. His wife was the sister of Fukubara Sadatoshi.
- Kumagai Nobunao (熊谷信直, 1507–1593), fought in nearly all of Motonari's battles.
- Kunishi Motosuke (国司元相, 1492–1592), fought with distinction at the Siege of Yoshida-Kōriyama Castle. Later, he was chosen as one of the five bugyō of the Mōri clan.
- Katsura Motozumi (桂元澄, 1500–1569)
- Kodama Naritada (児玉就忠, 1506–1562), Motonari valued his administrative skill. Motonari's bugyō along with Katsura Mototada (桂元忠). Under Mōri Terumoto he became one of the five bugyō.
- Yoshimi Masayori (吉見正頼, 1513–1588), originally a vassal of the Ōuchi clan, switched to Motonari after the death of Ōuchi Yoshitaka.
- Shiji Hiroyoshi (志道広良, 1467–1557), close with Motonari early when his brother Okimoto was clan head. Supported Motonari as successor to the leadership of the clan. Served as guardian of Motonari's first son, Takamoto.
- Awaya Motohide (粟屋元秀), was prized after the Battle of Arita-Nakaide by Motonari for his achievements.
- Awaya Motochika (粟屋元親, d. 1561), Motonari prized his skills with domestic affairs. Under Mōri Terumoto he became one of the five bugyō.
- Akagawa Motoyasu (赤川元保, d. 1567), imprisoned in his home under suspicion of the sudden death of Mōri Takamoto and later forced to commit suicide with his adopted son Akagawa Matasaburō.
- Watanabe Hajime (渡辺長, 1534–1612), saved Motonari's life at the First Siege of Toda Castle.
- Iida Motochika (飯田元親, d. 1535), second son of Kodama Motoyoshi (児玉元良), supported the succession of Motonari as clan head.
- Inoue Motokane (井上元兼, 1486–1550), escaped Motonari's purge of the Inoue clan because of his loyalty.

== Other notable retainers ==
- Hayashi Narinaga (林就長, 1517–1605), karō (clan elder) of Motonari and bugyō under Mōri Terumoto. Ginzan-bugyō (mining official) at the Iwami Ginzan Silver Mine. Junior Fifth Rank, Lower Grade (Ju go-i-no-ge, 従五位下), Hizen-no-kami (肥前守). Diplomat of the Mōri clan along with Ankokuji Ekei.
- Ankokuji Ekei (安国寺恵瓊), diplomat of the Mōri clan along with Hayashi Narinaga. He was a Rinzai Buddhist monk. Executed by Tokugawa Ieyasu for fighting on the side of Ishida Mitsunari at the Battle of Sekigahara.
- Kikkawa Kunitsune, father-in-law of Motonari.
- Kikkawa Hiroie (吉川広家), son of Kikkawa Motoharu, grandson of Motonari. His mother was daughter of Kumagai Nobunao
- Kikkawa Motomune (吉川元棟), son of Kikkawa Motoharu, grandson of Motonari. His mother was daughter of Kumagai Nobunao
- Katsura Mototada (桂元忠), was a bugyō of Motonari.
- Hironaka Kataaki (弘中方明), also (弘中就慰)
- Fukubara Mototoshi (福原元俊), Junior Fifth Rank, Lower Grade (Ju go-i-no-ge, 従五位下), Dewa-no-kami (出羽守).
- Nomi Takaoki (乃美隆興), father of one of Motonari's concubines, Nomi no Ōkata.
- Nomi Munekatsu (乃美宗勝)
- Hiraga Hirosuke (平賀広相)
- Hiraga Motosuke (平賀元相)
- Sugihara Morishige (杉原盛重)
- Miura Mototada (三浦元忠)
- Sugi Motosuke (杉元相)
- Hirasa Nariyuki (平佐就之), Ginzan-bugyō (mining official) at the Iwami Ginzan Silver Mine.
- Ōhashi Hachizō (大橋八蔵), Ginzan-bugyō (mining official) at the Iwami Ginzan Silver Mine.
- Awaya Motomichi (粟屋元通), Bizen-no-kami (備前守).
- Murakami Takeyoshi (村上武吉), captain of the Murakami Navy (能島村上水軍).
- Murakami Motoyoshi (村上元吉), son of Murakami Takayoshi, captain of the Murakami Navy (能島村上水軍).
- Miyoshi Masataka (三吉致高), father of one of Motonari's concubines.
- Miyoshi Takasuke (三吉隆亮), brother of one of Motonari's concubines.
- Masuda Motonaga (益田元祥), married to the daughter of Kikkawa Motoharu.
- Uehara Motomasa (上原元将), married to Motonari's third daughter.
- Wachi Masaharu (和智誠春), was under suspicion of the sudden death of Mōri Takamoto.
- Hayashi Motoyoshi, (林元善, 1558–1609), first son of Hayashi Narinaga. Shima-no-kami (志摩守).
- Hayashi Nagayoshi (林長由), second son of Hayashi Narinaga. Jirōuemon (次郎右エ門). Retainer of Kobayakawa Takakage, moved to Nuta and changed his name to Ishibashi.

== Motonari's castles ==
=== Aki Province ===
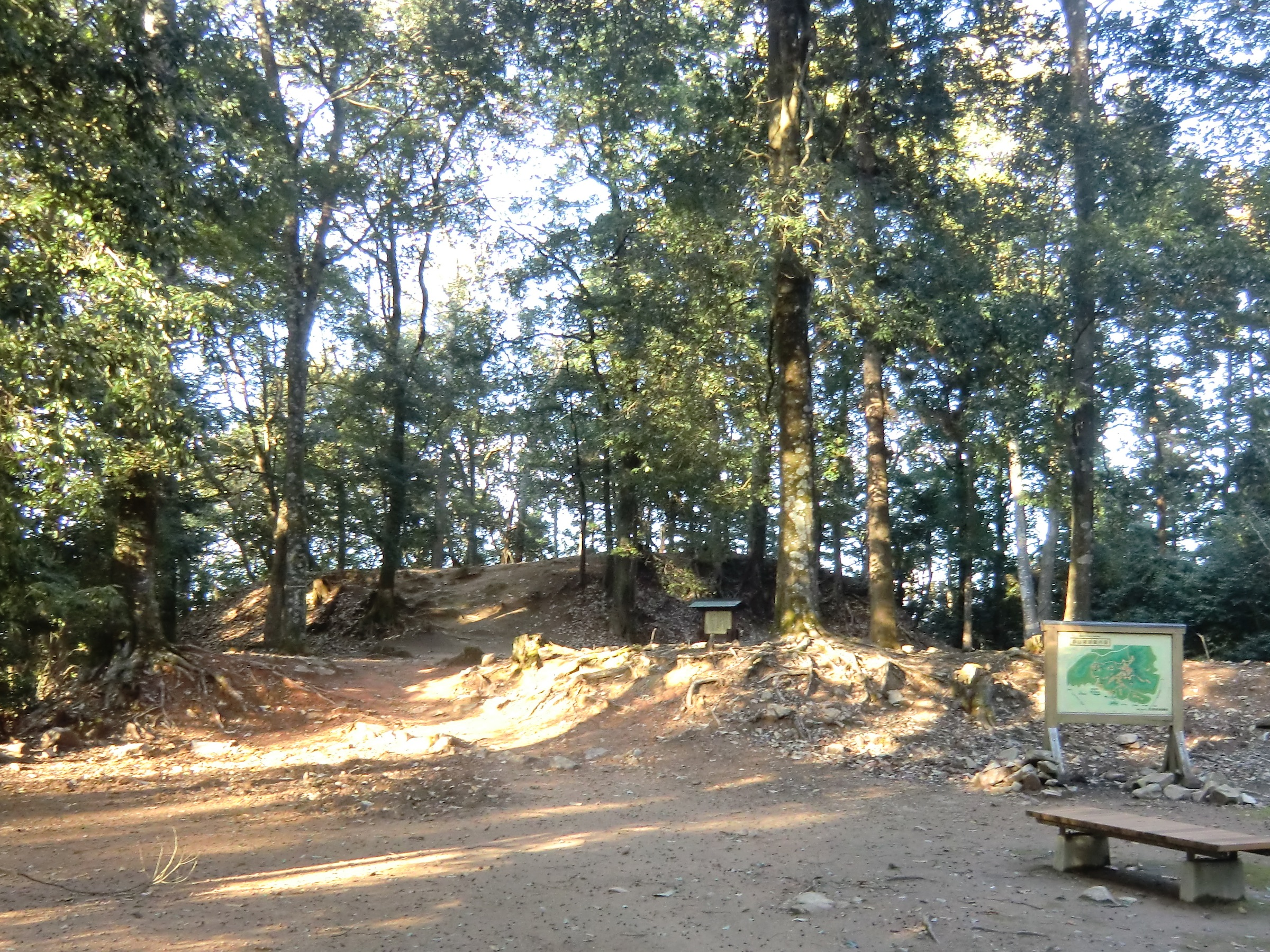
Honmaru compound of Yoshida-Kōriyama Castle

- Yoshida-Kōriyama Castle (吉田郡山城), main castle of the Mōri clan and residence of Motonari.
- Tajihi-Sarugake Castle (多治比猿掛城), Motonari spent his youth in the castle.
- Suzuo Castle (鈴尾城), main castle of the Fukuhara clan, Motonari's birthplace.
- Miiri-Takamatsu Castle (三入高松城), main castle of the Kumagai clan
- Goryu Castle (五龍城), main castle of the Shishido clan
- Katsura Castle (桂城), main castle of the Katsura clan
- Hinoyama Castle (日野山城), main castle of the Kikkawa clan
- Biwakō Castle (琵琶甲城), main castle of the Kuchiba clan
- Mibu Castle (壬生城)
- Funayama Castle (船山城)
- Nagamiyama Castle (長見山城)
- Toko no Yama Castle (鳥籠山城)
- Yagi Castle (八木城)
- Koi Castle (己斐城)
- Sato-Ginzan Castle (佐東銀山城)
- Sakurao Castle (桜尾城)
- Miyao Castle (宮尾城)
- Kusatsu Castle (草津城), main castle of the Kodama clan

=== Bingo Province ===
- Takayama Castle (高山城) main castle of the Kobayakawa clan until Kobayakawa Takakage moved their main castle to Niitakayama Castle
- Niitakayama Castle (新高山城) main castle of the Kobayakawa clan
- Mihara Castle (三原城) main castle of the Kobayakawa clan
- Hatagaeshiyama Castle (旗返城)
- Kannabe Castle (神辺城), main castle of the Sugihara clan
- Kashirazaki Castle (頭崎城), main castle of the Hiraga clan
- Kagi Castle (賀儀城), main castle of Ura clan Nomi Munekatsu

=== Other provinces ===
- Kōnomine Castle
- Gassantoda Castle
- Shikano Castle
- Odaka Castle : Sugihara Morishige
- Yamabuki Castle
- Kumano Castle : Amano Takashige
- Noshima Castle, main castle of the Noshima Murakami clan

== Popular culture ==
See People of the Sengoku period in popular culture.

Motonari often lives far beyond his means in popular culture, acting as the representative of his clan in affairs that take place far after his death (encountering Oda Nobunaga in the Mōri's later battles against him for just one instance).

- Portrayed by Nakamura Hashinosuke III in the 1997 NHK Taiga drama TV series Mohri Motonari. It was a year-long broadcast that retold the story of how Motonari rose from the leader of an insignificant military clan to become one of the most powerful warlords of the Sengoku period.
- He is represented as a playable character in the video game Sengoku Basara and all its sequels. In the game, he was described as an uncaring leader ambitious to conquer all of Japan. He was first armed with a saihai, then with a circular blade.
- He is represented as a playable character in the video game Samurai Warriors series.
- He is represented as a character in Pokémon Conquest as the warlord of the Greenleaf Kingdom, with his partner Pokémon being Servine and Serperior.
- The parable regarding Motonari, his three sons, and the lesson of the three arrows is believed have been a source of inspiration for Akira Kurosawa when he was writing his epic film Ran. The name of the local J League soccer team, Sanfrecce Hiroshima, was also inspired by this story. "San" means three in Japanese, and "frecce" means arrows in Italian.

== See also ==
- Sengoku period
- List of daimyōs from the Sengoku period
- Kobayakawa Takakage
- Kobayakawa Hidekane
- Amago Yoshihisa
- Kikkawa Motoharu
- Mōri Terumoto
- Battle of Miyajima
- Miyao Castle
