= Hironaka Takakane =

Japanese samurai (d. 1555)

- 弘中 隆兼 or 弘中 隆包
- Born: 1521? Nagato Province
- Died: 1555; Miyajima
- Military career
- Commands: Tsuchiyama Castle
- Conflicts: Siege of Gassantoda Castle; Battle of Miyajima

Hironaka Takakane (弘中 隆兼 or 弘中 隆包; 1521? – 1555) was a Japanese samurai and military commander of the Sengoku period. The Hironaka clan was one of the most important retainers of the Ōuchi clan for generations. The Hironaka clan led the naval forces. Takakane was appointed as a shugodai of the Aki by Ōuchi Yoshitaka.

In the Battle of Miyajima occurred in 1555, Takakane judged it is not wise to attack Miyamija and advised Sue Harukata to attack Mōri Motonari directly but Harukata would not listen to Takakane's advice. Ōuchi force led by Sue Harukata was defeated soon by the Mōri clan but Takakane fought for three days and committed seppuku.
