= Miyao Castle =

- (宮尾城)
- Itsukushima, Hiroshima Prefecture, Japan
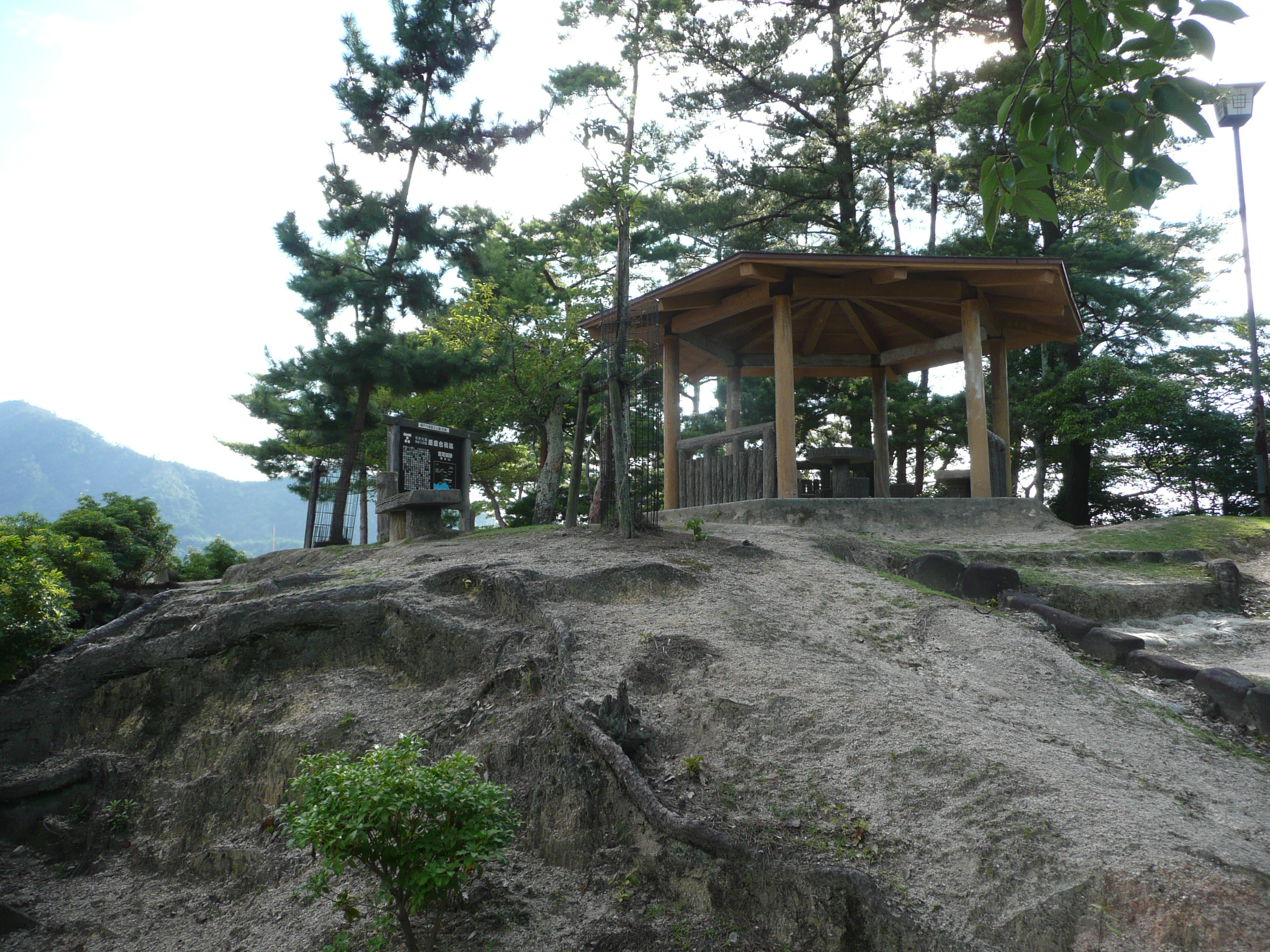
- Location of the main courtyard.

Site information
- Type: Hill-on-Plains castle (平山城)
- Controlled by: Hatsukaichi, Hiroshima
- Open to the public: 24/7
- Condition: Site remains; main courtyard accessible.

Location
- Location of Miyao Castle site
- Location within Japan
- Coordinates: 34.300554°N 132.322415°E

Site history
- Built: 1555
- Built by: Mōri Motonari
- In use: 1555 – ?
- Materials: Earth, wood, stone.
- Battles/wars: Battle of Miyajima

Miyao Castle (宮尾城, miyao-jō) was a fortification built on the island of Itsukushima (also known as Miyajima) during the Sengoku Period in Japan. Although referred to as a Japanese castle, it did not have a donjon (tenshu) or serve as the residence of a land-holding noble, and therefore is probably more within the definition of a hill fort, rather than a true castle. Built by Mōri Motonari, Miyao Castle was part of a greater plan to bait and trap his enemy, Sue Harukata, which culminated in the Battle of Miyajima in 1555.

The site of Miyao castle is located in Hamano-cho on the island of Miyajima, Hatsukaichi city, Hiroshima Prefecture.

== Background ==
In 1551, Sue Harukata revolted against his lord Ōuchi Yoshitaka, forcing him to commit seppuku. Sue effectively led the Ōuchi family and its armies, which ruled over Aki Province. In 1554, Mōri Motonari, as a fellow vassal of the Ōuchi clan, took up arms against Sue. The heavily outnumbered Mōri force attacked and defeated Sue at the Battle of Oshikibata. Mōri later departed from the mainland to build Miyao Castle on Itsukushima, popularly known as Miyajima.

== Castle construction ==
As site for Miyao Castle, Mōri Motonari selected a 30-meter hill called Yougai-san (要害山) in the northwest corner of the island, near the main shrine and overlooking the channel between Miyajima and the mainland. Miyao Castle was designed as a Hill-on-Plains castle (平山城, hirayamajiro) on a piece of land at the foot of steep-sided mountains, including the 535-meter Mount Misen. The castle area could be approached by sea on three sides. Thus, Miyao Castle was intended to be highly visible and fairly vulnerable.

The castle was hastily built with the forthcoming battle in mind. About 1,000 laborers were employed, and it took them about one month to build it to Motonari's satisfaction. Stone walls had to be built in order to buttress the weakly tamped earthen foundation which, without support, would have easily collapsed. A permanent donjon (tenshu) was probably never built.

== Battle of Miyajima ==
When construction of Miyao Castle was complete, Motonari departed for the mainland, leaving a small garrison to defend the castle. In late September 1555, Sue Harukata took the bait, attacked, and took the castle with overwhelming force. Within days, Motonari and his allies maneuvered into their respective positions and stormed Miyao Castle from three sides. While a landing force approached from the sea, two other groups had landed on the other side of the island, travelled overland, and attacked the castle from behind. Although Motonari's forces were heavily outnumbered, he knew the land and the castle's weaknesses, and thus had the tactical advantage as well as the element of surprise. Motonari's forces were able to kill, capture, or scatter the occupying defenders and re-take the castle. The battle became an important milestone in the history of western Japan.

== Aftermath ==
No records specify what was done with Miyao Castle after the Battle of Miyajima. It was poorly built to begin with, a temporary fortification intended as bait in an elaborate trap. Of further consideration is the fact that Miyao Castle was built on sacred ground, and the ensuing battle was itself an act of desecration in a place where neither birth nor death are supposed to occur. Following the battle, resident Shinto priests conducted elaborate ceremonies in order to remove the pollution of death. Therefore, it is generally believed that Miyao Castle was abandoned by the Mōri clan. The site was probably plundered for its stones and lumber, to be used as construction materials elsewhere.

The site of Miyao Castle is now a small park on top of Yougai Hill. There is an explanatory signboard and a small shrine there. The hill is bounded on all sides by residences, shops restaurants, hotels, and ryokan; access to the park is via two staircases on opposite sides of the hill, one of which is very near the ferry docks. The Miyao Castle site is given little or no attention in the tourist literature of Itsukushima, and so it is rarely visited.
