= Hiraga Hirosuke =

Japanese samurai

- 平賀 広相
- Born: 1528; Aki Province
- Died: March 17, 1567 (aged 38–39); Aki Province
- Military career
- Commands: Kashirazaki castle
- Conflicts: Battle of Miyajima

Hiraga Hirosuke (平賀 広相; 1528–1567) was a Japanese samurai and commander of the Sengoku period. Hiraga clan was a local samurai in Aki Province.

In 1552, he took a pledge of brotherhood with Kobayakawa Takakage and Hiraga clan became an important servant of the Mōri clan. He played an important role in the Battle of Miyajima and contributed to the victory .
