= Yoshida-Kōriyama Castle =

- 吉田郡山城
- Akitakata, Hiroshima Prefecture, Japan
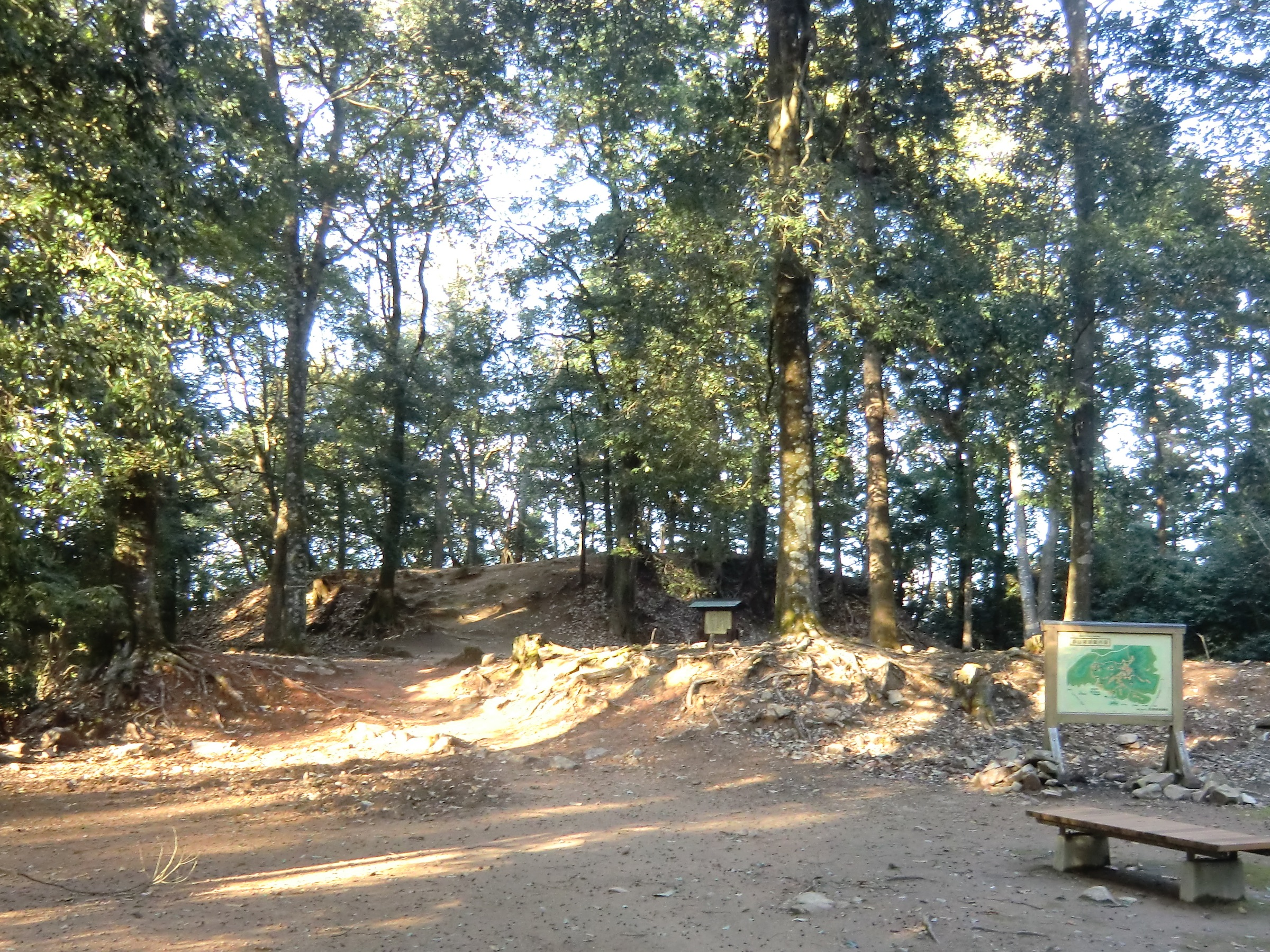
- Honmaru compound of Yoshida-Kōriyama Castle

Site information
- Type: Mountaintop style Japanese castle
- Controlled by: Mōri clan

Location
- Yoshida-Kōriyama Castle
- Location within Hiroshima Prefecture Location within Japan
- Coordinates: 34°40′27.43″N 132°42′34.52″E

Site history
- Built by: Mōri Motonari
- In use: Sengoku period
- Demolished: 1600
- Battles/wars: Siege of Yoshida-Kōriyama Castle (1541)

Garrison information
- Occupants: Mōri Motonari; Mōri Terumoto
- National Historic Site of Japan

Yoshida-Kōriyama Castle (吉田郡山城, Yoshida-Kōriyama-jō) was a Japanese castle located in Akitakata, Hiroshima Prefecture. It was also called Aki-Kōriyama Castle (安芸郡山城, Aki-Kōriyama-jō) from its location in former Aki Province. Its ruins have been protected by the central government as a National Historic Site since 1940.

== History ==
Yoshida-Kōriyama Castle is located in the Yoshida basin in northern Hiroshima prefecture, surrounded by the Chugoku Mountains. The basin has two large rivers; the Gonokawa which flows north to the Sea of Japan and the Otagawa, which flows south to the Seto Inland Sea. The castle was initially built as a small fortification in the 14th century, by the Mōri clan, which descended from Ōe no Hiromoto, an important retainer of the Kamakura shogunate. His fourth son, Mōri Suemitsu controlled a shōen landed estate in Aki Province, and through the Muromachi period, his descendants gradually became leader of an alliance of jizamurai local lords in eastern Aki and western Bingo Province. At the time, Aki was a highly contested border area between the powerful Ouchi clan based in Suo Province and the Yamana clan, who were allied with the Muromachi shogunate. After the Yamana clan was destroyed in the struggles of the Onin War (1467-1477), the Izumo-based Amago clan rose to challenge the Ouchi clan, and the Mōri clan changed allegiance multiple times between these two powerful neighbors in order to survive. Under Mōri Motonari, Yoshida-Kōriyama Castle was greatly expanded to become the main stronghold of the clan. Mōri Motonari chose to ally with the Ouchi and in response to this, in September 1540, the Amago besieged the castle at the Siege of Yoshida-Kōriyama Castle, but the Mōri defeated them with Ouchi assistance in January 1541. Mōri Motonari first defeated the Amago with the help of the Ouchi, and then defeated the Ouchi after they were weakened by internal conflict. The Mōri became more influential, and extended its holdings to cover most of the Chugoku region. Yoshida-Kōriyama Castle was repaired, rebuilt and expanded in size to cover most of the mountain. It became quite advanced for a mountaintop castle (yamashiro), with complex inner and outer stone walls, a quadrangle and a stone-walled fort.

Mōri Motonari had three sons. The eldest, Mōri Takamoto, was given Yoshida-Kōriyama Castle, the second, Kikkawa Motoharu was assigned to San'in region and ruled from Hinoyama Castle, and the third, Kobayakawa Takakage was assigned the San'yo region and ruled from Niitakayama Castle and later Mihara Castle. The Amago were decisively defeated in 1566, and Mōri Motonari ordered the further expansion and strengthening of Yoshida-Kōriyama Castle.

In 1589, Mori Terumoto began the construction of Hiroshima Castle as the new seat of his domains and relocated there in 1591, but Yoshida-Kōriyama was retained as the castle was important for Mōri clan. However, in 1600, the Mōri joined the western alliance against Tokugawa Ieyasu and participated in the Battle of Sekigahara. When the western allies lost the battle, the Mōri clan were stripped of their eastern territories (including Aki Province) and forced west into the provinces of Suō and Nagato. Yoshida-Kōriyama Castle was largely demolished in the early Edo period under the "one domain-one castle" policy of the Tokugawa shogunate, like many castles in Japan that were not the seat of a domain.

== Preservation ==
Currently the site of this castle is used as a historical park. There are some substantial structures left at the current site, mainly some low stone walls and moats. However, considering it was such a large castle that covered much of the mountain, there are about 130 relics left of the castle on the site. The castle ruins are located about 15 minutes by car from Mukohara Station on the JR West Geibi Line.

Akitakata City Historical Museum is located near the castle, where excavated artifacts from the castle are exhibited. Yoshida-Kōriyama Castle was listed as one of Japan's Top 100 Castles by the Japan Castle Foundation in 2006.

== Gallery ==
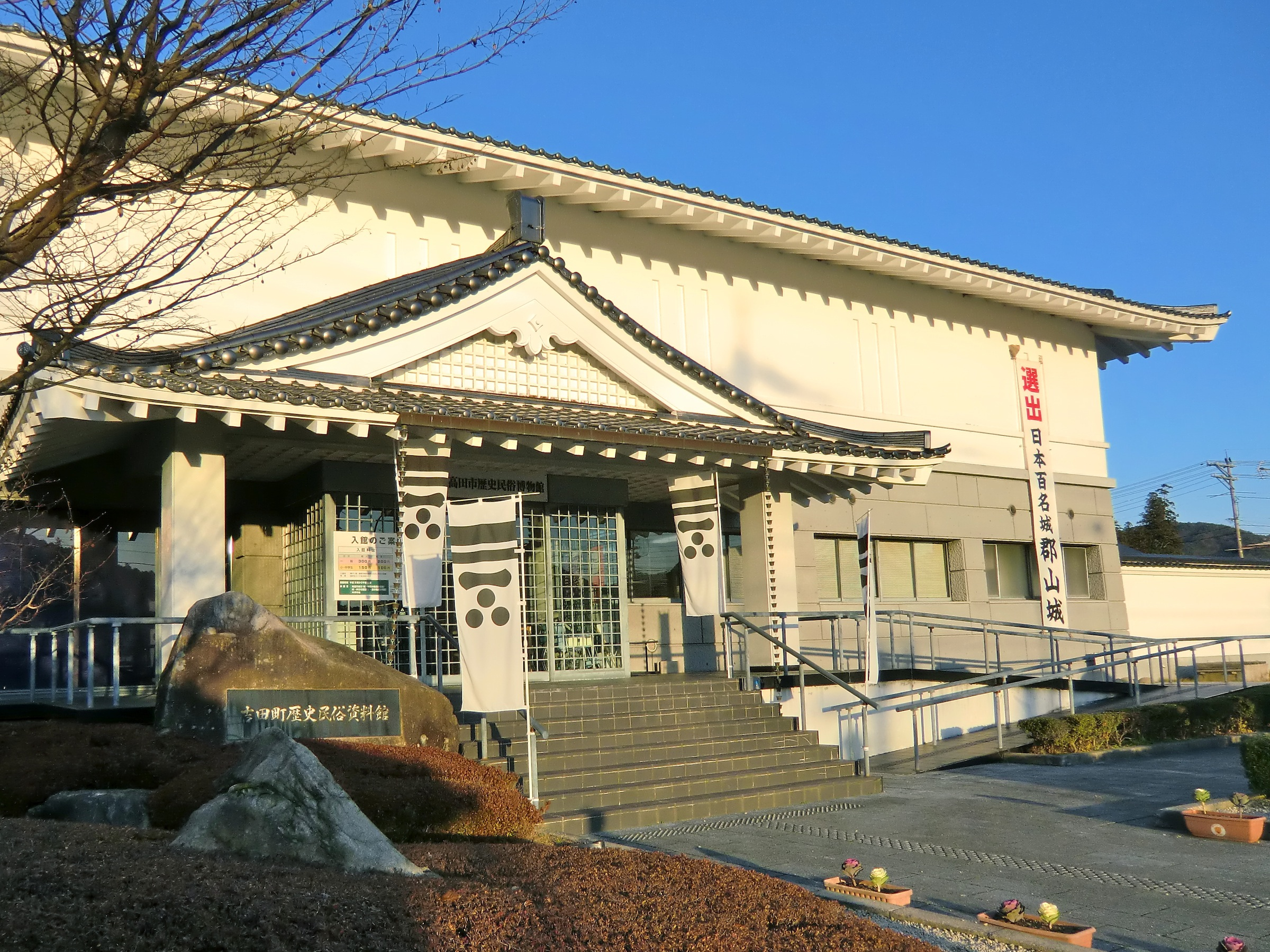
Akitakata City Historical Museum

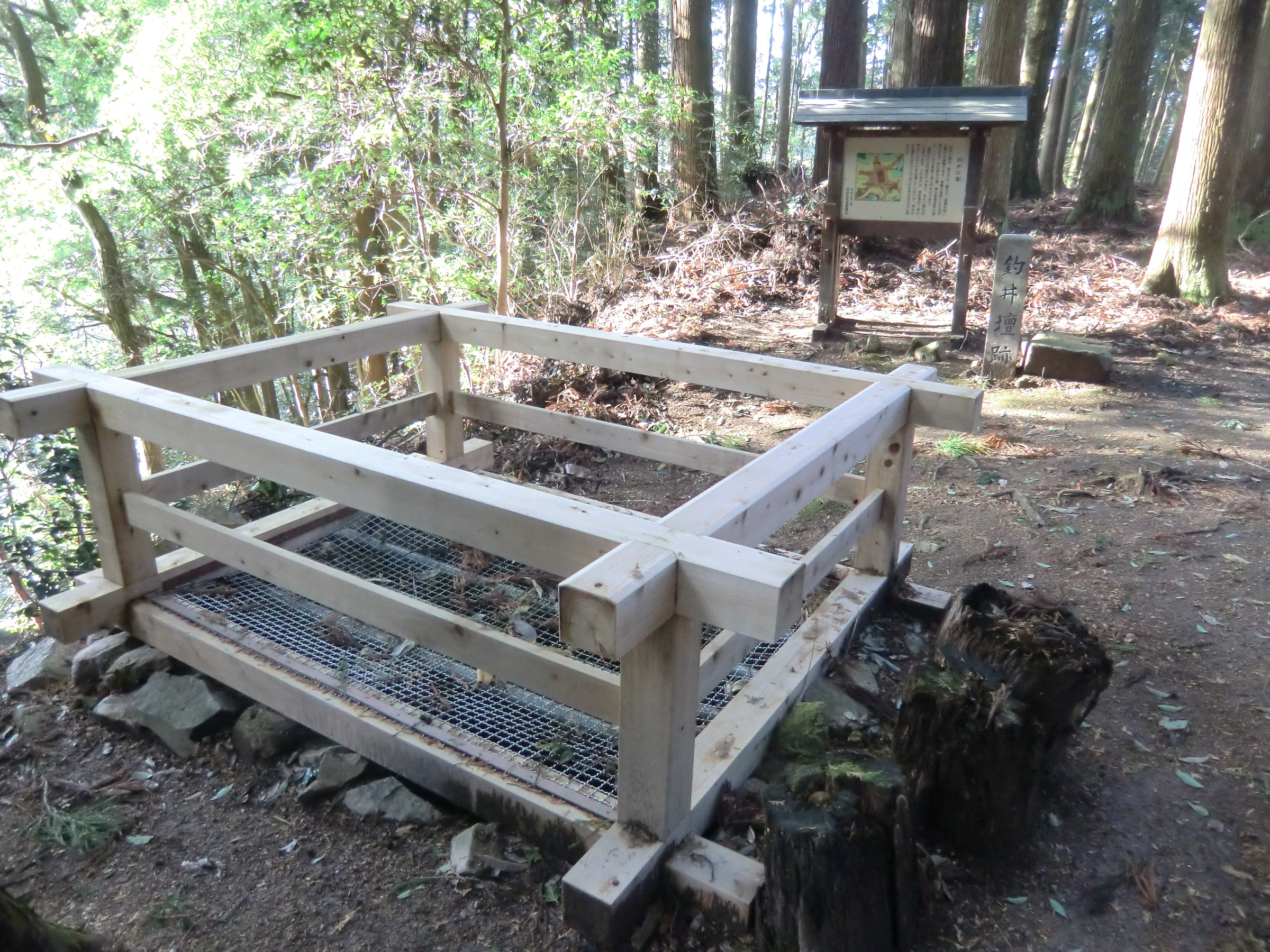
Well of Kōriyama Castle

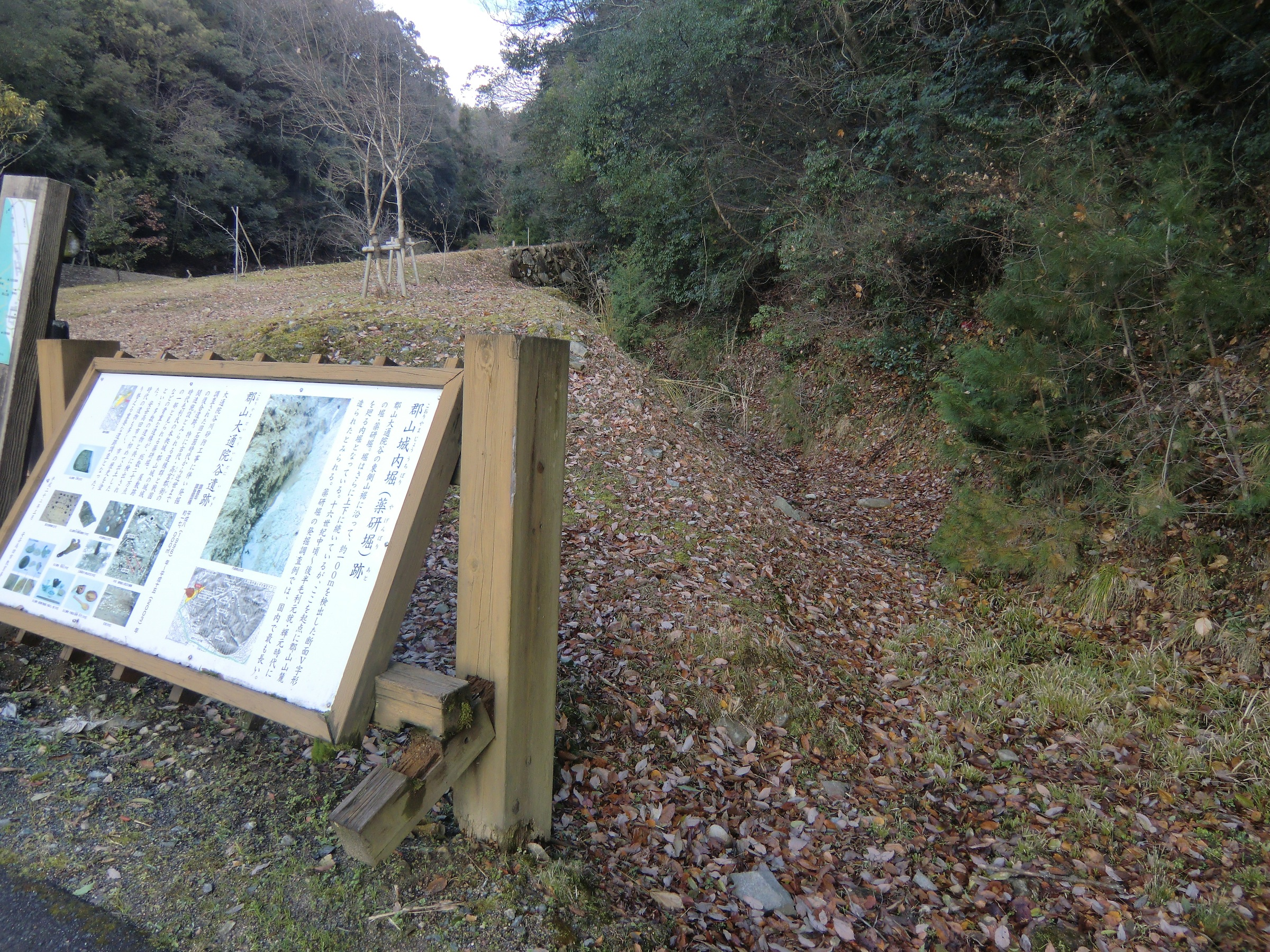
Dry moat of Kōriyama Castle

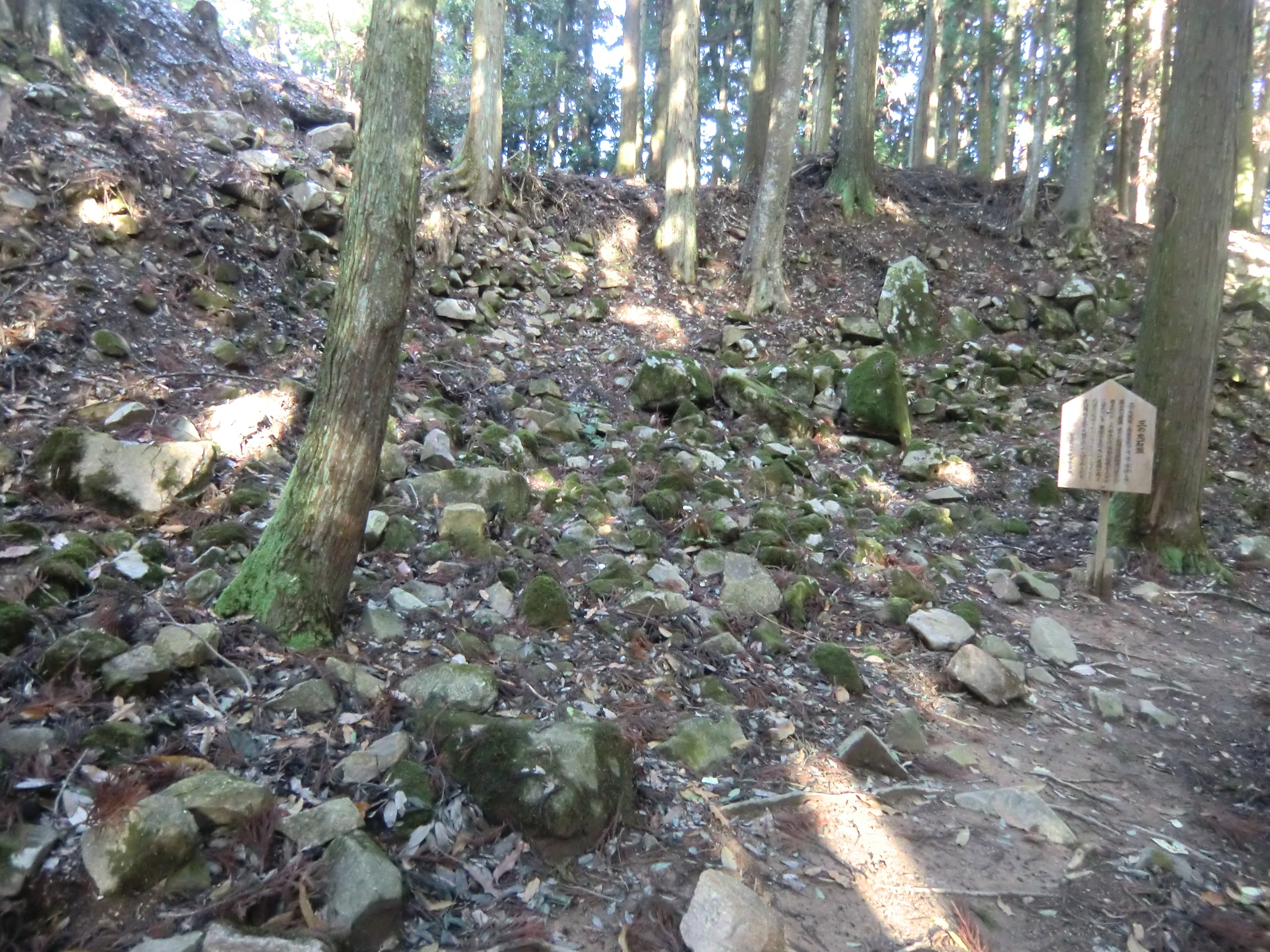
Demolished stone wall

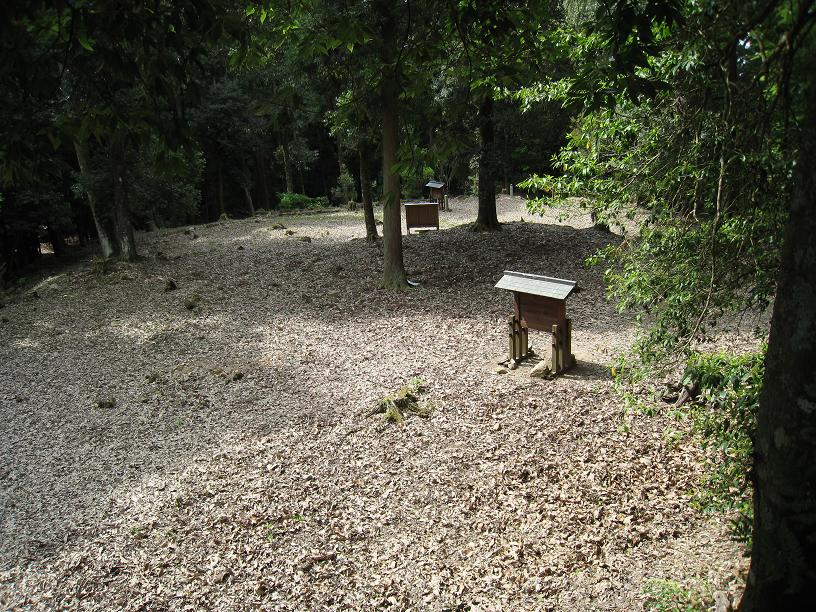
Ninomaru compound

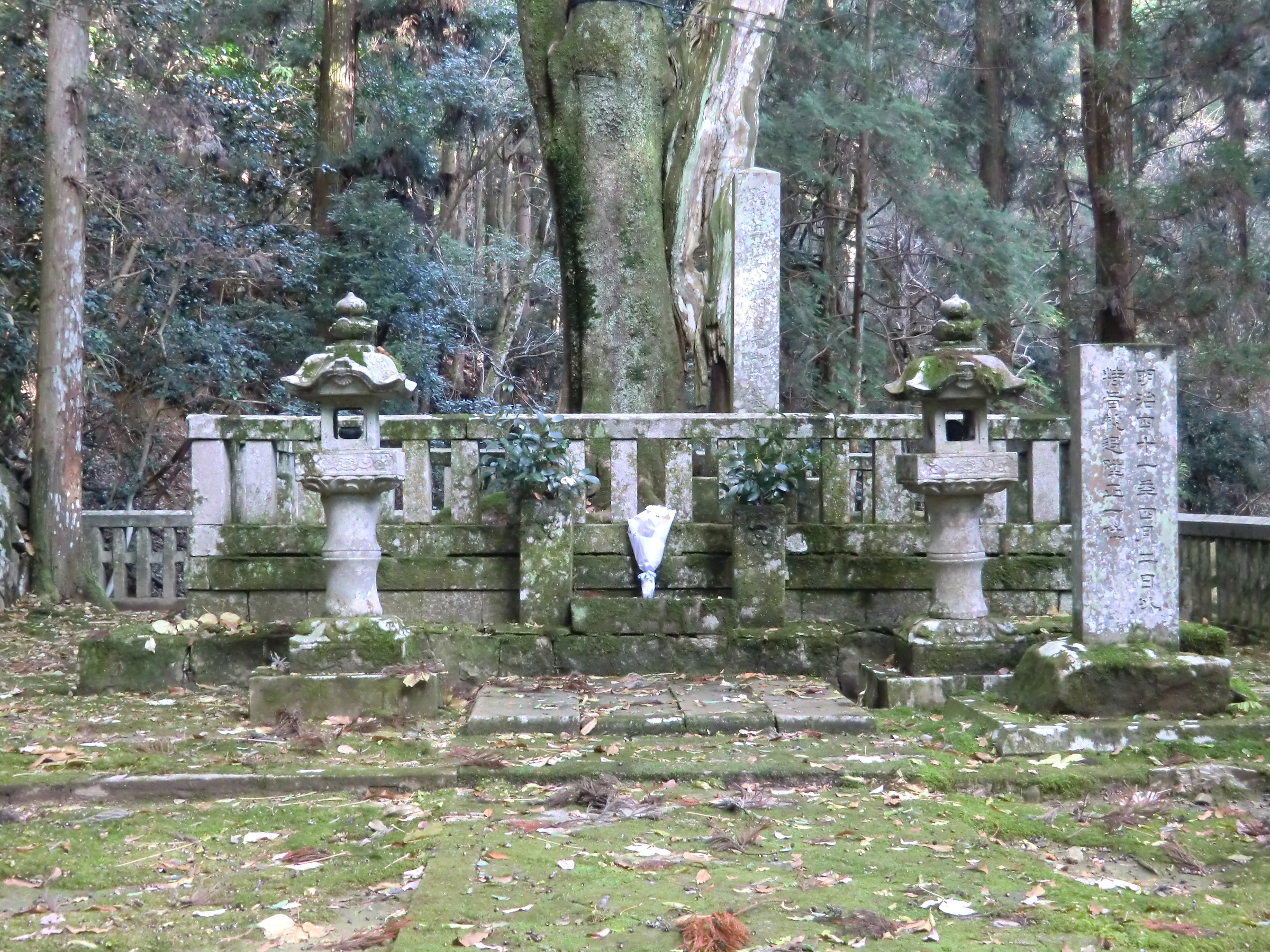
Tomb of Mōri Motonari

== See also ==
- List of Historic Sites of Japan (Hiroshima)
