= Battle of Arita-Nakaide =

- Part of the Sengoku period
Date	October 1517
Location	Arita Castle and surroundings, Aki Province, Japan 34°40′06″N 132°31′55″E
Result	Mōri victory

Belligerents
Takeda clan of Aki	Forces of Mōri Motonari and Yoshikawa clan

Commanders and leaders
Takeda Motoshige †; Kumagai Motojika †	Mōri Motonari; Mōri Mototsuna

Strength
5,000	850 Mōri; 300 Yoshikawa reinforcements Total: 1,150
- Location within Japan

The Battle of Arita-Nakaide (有田中井手の戦) took place in 1517 in Aki Province, Japan during the Sengoku period. During the battle, Takeda Motoshige was defeated by a young Mōri Motonari. It was Motonari's first battle.

== Background ==
In the early 16th century Takeda Motoshige (also known as Motoshigeru), a local lord of Aki Province, accompanied the daimyō Ōuchi Yoshioki, his liege lord, to restore Ashikaga Yoshitane to the shogunate in Kyoto. At some point around 1515 Motoshige returned to Aki and broke off from the Ōuchi, changing his allegiance to the Amago.

At this time the Mōri clan (a vassal of the Ōuchi), were neighbors of the Takeda in Aki. When Mōri Okimoto died in 1516, and was succeeded by his young son Komatsumaru, Takeda Motoshige took advantage of this and, in the following year, gathered an army of 5,000 and in October advanced into the territory of the Mōri's Yoshikawa allies and surrounded Arita Castle (有田城). A few weeks later, Motoshige dispatched a raid into the Mōri clan's territory and set fire to houses in Tajihi (多治比). The Mōri clan's response was led by Mōri Motonari, younger brother to Okimoto and guardian of Komatsumaru.

== Battle ==
With most of the Ōuchi forces preoccupied in Kyoto with Ōuchi Yoshioki, the Mōri were unable to call on them for assistance, and Motonari instead mobilized his clan and called on their supporters. Motonari was also supported in this by his younger brother, Mototsuna. In total the Mōri strength comprised around 850 men, reinforced by 300 from the Yoshikawa, for a total of around 1,000. This force marched towards Arita Castle and on the way encountered the Takeda vanguard of about 500 men, commanded by Kumagai Motonao. The Mōri and their allies stood off and engaged the Takeda with archery fire. Kumagai Motonao was in the front ranks and was encouraging his men when he was struck and killed by an arrow.

Takeda Motoshige was meanwhile with the main army at Arita Castle. Learning of Motojika's demise, he drew up his forces and marched to engage the smaller Mōri resistance. The Takeda encountered the Môri and Yoshikawa occupying the opposite bank of the Uchikawa River and a bitter struggle ensued. Heavily outnumbered, the Mōri-led forces began to falter and fall back, and rallied only when Motonari pleaded with them to stand their ground. Takeda Motoshige himself advanced forward across the river on horseback but was struck by an arrow and killed. The Takeda broke and retreated, leaving Mori Motonari the victor.

== Bibliography ==
- Rekishi Gunzō Shirizu No. 49, Mōri Senki, Gakken, Japan, 1997
- Arita Castle (有田城址) – Kitahiroshima-chō Tourist Information Website (Kitahiroshima-chō Tourism Association)
