= Iida Yoshitake =

Iida Yoshitake (飯田義武) (died 1592) was a notable retainer of the Mori clan of the Aki Province. Yoshitake and Kodama Narikata both served as commanders of the Mori's naval fleet. During the Battle of Miyajima in the year 1555, Yoshitake participated in the transportation of the main Mori attack force to Miyajima. Along the Buzen and Chikuzen coasts, Yoshitake was also in numerous battles.

He was rewarded by Iida clan for his naval achievements during the early years of the Eiroku era.
