= Battle of Oshikibata =

1554 battle in Japan

- Part of the Sengoku period
Date	1554
Location	Oshikibata, Aki Province 34°21′25″N 132°17′04″E
Result	Mōri victory

Belligerents
Forces loyal to Sue Harukata	Forces of Mōri Motonari

Commanders and leaders
Miyagawa Fusanaga	Mōri Motonari

Strength
7,000	3,000
- Location within Japan

The Battle of Oshikibata (折敷畑の戦い, Oshikibata no tatakai) was a preliminary round of the battle of Miyajima which was to follow. Mōri Motonari sought to avenge Sue Harukata's coup against their lord, Ōuchi Yoshitaka, and succeeded.

Following the battle of Miyajima, the Mōri clan gained all the Ōuchi lands, and replaced them as one of the most powerful families in the country.
