= Suzuo Castle =

Castle in Hiroshima Prefecture, Japan

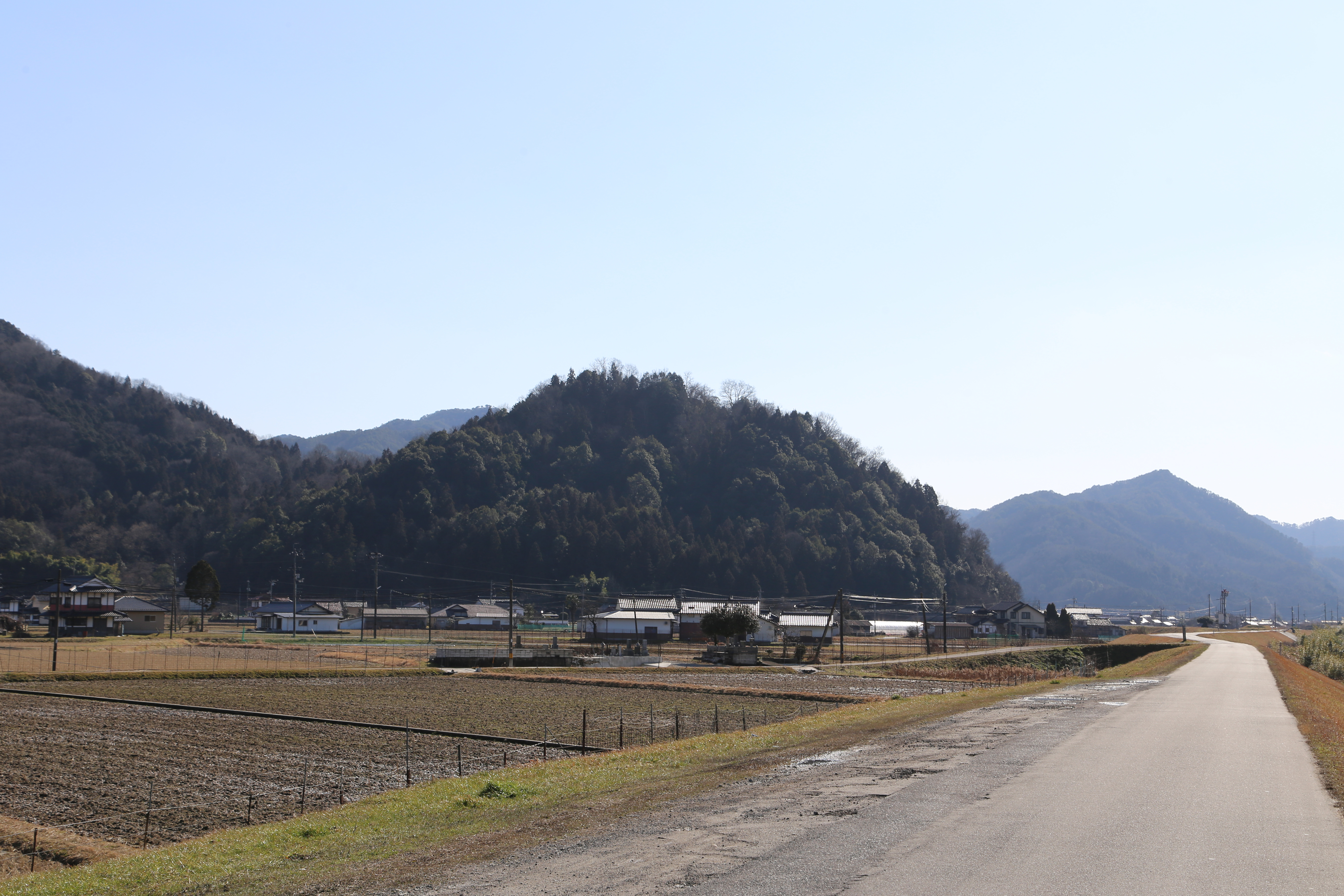
Site of the former castle

Suzuo Castle (鈴尾城) was the main castle of the Fukubara clan. It is located in Fukubara of Akitakata, Hiroshima, in what used to be Aki Province. It is also known as "Fukubara Castle" (福原城). It is also famous as the birthplace of the warlord Mōri Motonari.
