= Nomi Munekatsu =

Japanese samurai

- 乃美 宗勝
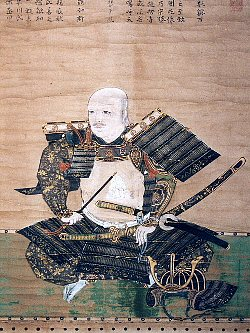
- Born: 1527
- Died: September 29, 1592 (aged 64–65)
- Military career
- Commands: Kagi Castle, Tachibanayama castle
- Conflicts: Battle of Miyajima (1555); Siege of Moji (1561); Siege of Tsuneyama castle (1575); Battles of Kizugawaguchi (1578); Bunroku no Eki(1592)

Nomi Munekatsu (乃美 宗勝, Nomi Munekatsu) (1527–1592) was a Japanese samurai of the Sengoku through Azuchi-Momoyama periods who served as a naval commander of the Mōri clan and directly as Kobayakawa Takakage's retainer. He was a commander of Kagi Castle.

He helped bring the waterborne Murakami family into the Môri's camp during the campaign that culminated in the Battle of Miyajima. He fought in numerous battles between 1587 and 1592. His tomb is at Sōshō-ji Temple(宗勝寺) near the Tachibanayama Castle in Fukuoka Prefecture.
