= Kikkawa Motoharu =

16th-century Japanese samurai

- 吉川 元春
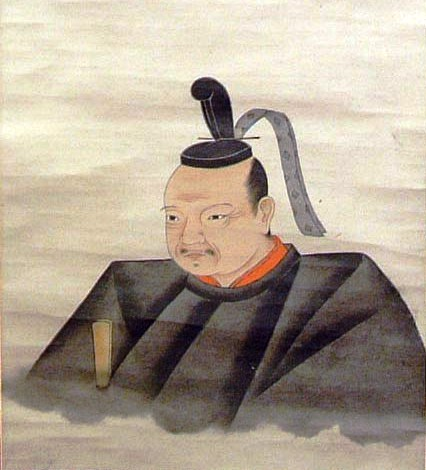
- Born: 1530; Yoshida, Aki Province
- Died: December 25, 1586 (aged 56 or 57); Aki Province
- Relatives: Father: Mōri Motonari; Mother: Lady Myōkyū
- Military career
- Allegiance: Mōri clan Toyotomi clan
- Rank: Daimyō
- Nicknames: Shōnojirō (少輔次郎) “Mōri Ryōsen", or “Mōri's Two Rivers" (毛利両川).
- Unit: Kikkawa clan
- Commands: Hinoyama Castle
- Conflicts: Battle of Miyajima (1555); Siege of Toda Castle (1566); Battle of Torisaka (1568); Battle of Tatarahama (1569); Siege of Kōzuki Castle (1578); Siege of Takamatsu (1582); Invasion of Shikoku (1585)

Kikkawa Motoharu (吉川 元春; 1530 – December 25, 1586) was the second son of Mōri Motonari, and featured prominently in all the wars of the Mōri clan. He became an active commander of the Mōri army and he with his brother Kobayakawa Takakage became known as the “Mōri Ryōsen", or “Mōri's Two Rivers" (毛利両川).

== Biography ==
In 1530, he was born in Yoshida-Kōriyama Castle. When Motoharu was young he was adopted into the Kikkawa clan by Kikkawa Okitsune. He then became head of the family around 1550. In 1547, He married Kumagai Nobunao's daughter.

Motoharu fought in many battles alongside his brother, Kobayakawa Takakage, including the 1555 Battle of Miyajima and the 1570 Battle of Nunobeyama.

In 1566, he claimed Izumo Province as his fief, after defeating its lords, the Amago clan, in a number of battles.

He fought in the 1568 Battle of Torisaka. and the 1569 Battle of Tatarahama.

Motoharu also fought in many battles against the Oda such as the 1578 Siege of Kōzuki Castle and the 1582 Siege of Takamatsu. After Oda Nobunaga's death in 1582, Motoharu fought under Toyotomi Hideyoshi on Invasion of Shikoku (1585). Motoharu was unhappy to become a Hideyoshi's vassal and retired.

In 1586, he died in the Kokura Castle. After his death, Motoharu was succeeded as head of the Kikkawa clan by one of his sons, Kikkawa Hiroie.

== Mōri's Two Rivers ==
Japan in 1570 showing the extent of the Mōri clan.

Strong and fearless, Motoharu participated in many battles such as Miyajima and Nunobeyama, bolstering his reputation as a valiant commander. There are claims that he won 64 of 76 battles throughout his entire life. According to the Meisho Genko Roku, his brawn was often contrasted with Kobayakawa Takakage's intellect back in their youth. This inspired Mori Motonari to make effective use of their differences in personality by relegating Motoharu to the front lines while leaving Takakage to provide strategic support from the rear. Although Motoharu heavily contributed to the Mōri's military growth, he was familiar with literature and even transcribed a series of books called the Taiheki during the siege of Gassantoda Castle. They were both together pillars of the Mōri forces and were known as "Mōri's Two Rivers" (Mōri Ryōsen, 毛利両川).

After the death of Mōri Motonari in 1571, "Mōri's Two Rivers" (Kobayakawa Takakage and Kikkawa Motoharu) became more important as assistants to Mōri Terumoto against the remnants of their enemies, the Ōtomo clan (大友氏), Amako clan (尼子氏), and Ōuchi clan (大内氏).

== Family ==
Kikkawa clan mon

- Father: Mōri Motonari (1497–1571)
  - Foster Father: Kikkawa Okitsune (1508–1550)
- Mother: Myōkyū (1499–1546)
- Siblings:
  - An unnamed sister
  - Mōri Takamoto (1523–1563)
  - Lady Goryū, wife of Shishido Takaie (died 1574)
  - Kobayakawa Takakage (1533–1597)
- Half-siblings:
  - Ninomiya Naritoki (1546–1607)
  - Mōri Motokiyo (1551–1597)
  - Mōri Motoaki (1552–1585)
  - Izuha Mototomo (1555–1571)
  - Amano Motomasa (1559–1609)
  - Suetsugu Motoyasu (1560–1601)
  - Kobayakawa Hidekane (1567–1601)
- Wife: Lady Shinjō, daughter of Kumagai Nobunao (died 1606)
- Children:
  - Kikkawa Motonaga (1548–1587)
  - Mōri Motōji (1556–1631)
  - Kikkawa Hiroie (1561–1625)
  - Kikkawa Shōjumaru (died 1578)
  - Masuda Motonaga's wife
  - Yoshimi Motoyori's wife

Preceded by Kikkawa Okitsune	Kikkawa family head ????–1586	Succeeded by Kikkawa Motonaga
