= Kikkawa clan =

Powerful Japanese samurai clan

Kikkawa clan 吉川氏
- Kikkawa clan mon
- Home province: Izumo; Aki; Suō
- Parent house: Fujiwara clan (平氏); Kudō clan (工藤氏); Irie clan (入江氏)
- Titles: Various
- Founder: Kikkawa Tsuneyoshi (吉川経義)
- Final ruler: Kikkawa Tsunetake (吉川経健)
- Founding year: 12th century
- Dissolution: still extant
- Ruled until: 1868 (Meiji Restoration)

The Kikkawa clan (吉川氏, Kikkawa-shi) was a prominent samurai clan of Japan's Sengoku period. The most famous member of the clan is likely Kikkawa Motoharu (1530-1586), one of Toyotomi Hideyoshi's generals, who was adopted into the family. Along with the Kobayakawa clan, the Kikkawa played an important role in Hideyoshi's Kyūshū Campaign (1586-7), and later became daimyō in Izumo Province and Iwakuni after that.

== Origins ==
The founder of the clan, Kikkawa Tsuneyoshi (吉川経義), was a son of Irie Kageyoshi (入江景義). The Irie clan descends through the Kudō clan from the Southern House of the Fujiwara clan.

The family takes the name from a place called Kikkawa in Irie no sho domain, in Suruga province. Tsuneyoshi distinguished himself in the search and seizure of Kajiwara Kagetoki and gained a territory in Fukui no sho, in Harima Province. He then distinguished himself in the Jokyu War and became the jito of Oasa no sho in Aki Province.

In 1550, Kikkawa Okitsune was murdered by a conspiracy of Mori Motonari, and the main branch of the Kikkawa clan was destroyed. Motoharu, the second son of Mori Motonari received Okitsune's name and estates.

== Clan Heads ==
1. Kikkawa Tsuneyoshi (吉川経義, 1132–1193), son of Irie Kageyoshi (入江景義), founder of the clan.
2. Kikkawa Tomokane (吉川友兼, 1159–1200)
3. Kikkawa Tomotsune (吉川朝経, 1182–1240)
4. Kikkawa Tsunemitsu (吉川経光, 1192–1267)
5. Kikkawa Tsunetaka (吉川経高, 1234–1319)
6. Kikkawa Tsunemori (吉川経盛, 1290–1358)
7. Kikkawa Tsuneaki (吉川経秋, ? –1383)
8. Kikkawa Tsunemi (吉川経見, ? –1435)
9. Kikkawa Tsunenobu (吉川経信, 1396–1456)
10. Kikkawa Yukitsune (吉川之経, 1415–1477)
11. Kikkawa Tsunemoto (吉川経基, 1428–1520)
12. Kikkawa Kunitsune (吉川国経, 1443–1531), his daughter married Mōri Motonari.
13. Kikkawa Mototsune (吉川元経, 1459–1522), he married the daughter of Mōri Hiromoto and sister of Mōri Motonari.
14. Kikkawa Okitsune (吉川興経, 1508–1550), his mother was the daughter of Mōri Hiromoto and sister of Mōri Motonari.
15. Kikkawa Motoharu (吉川元春, 1530–1586), second son of Mōri Motonari.
16. Kikkawa Motonaga (吉川元長, 1548–1587)
17. Kikkawa Hiroie (吉川広家, 1561–1625)
18. Kikkawa Hiromasa (吉川広正, 1601–1666)
19. Kikkawa Hiroyoshi (吉川広嘉, 1621–1679)
20. Kikkawa Hironori (吉川広紀, 1658–1696)
21. Kikkawa Hiromichi (吉川広逵, 1695–1715)
22. Kikkawa Tsunenaga (吉川経永, 1714–1764)
23. Kikkawa Tsunetomo (吉川経倫, 1764–1803)
24. Kikkawa Tsunetada (吉川経忠, 1766–1803)
25. Kikkawa Tsunekata (吉川経賢, 1791–1807)
26. Kikkawa Tsunehiro (吉川経礼, 1793–1837)
27. Kikkawa Tsunekira (吉川経章, 1794–1844)
28. Kikkawa Tsunemasa (吉川経幹, 1829–1867)
29. Kikkawa Tsunetake (吉川経健, 1855–1909)

== Clan members of note ==
- Kikkawa Tsuneie (d. 1581)
- Kikkawa Motoharu (1530-1586) - General under Hideyoshi; died in Kyūshū Campaign
- Kikkawa Motonaga (1547-1587) - Son of Motoharu
- Kikkawa Hiroie (1561-1625) - Son of Motoharu; Daimyō of Izumo and later Iwakuni
- Kikkawa Hiromasa - Son of Motoharu
- Yoshikawa Koretari (1616-1694) - also known as Kikkawa Koretari; Shintō philosopher
- Kikkawa Reika (1875-1929) - Yamato-e painter
