= Fukubara Hirotoshi =

Japanese Samurai

Fukubara Hirotoshi (福原 広俊) was a Japanese samurai of the Sengoku period, who served the Mōri clan. He was the eighth head of the Fukubara clan,

the daughter of Hirotoshi, married Mōri Hiromoto from Mōri clan and gave birth to Mōri Motonari in 1497.
