= Wachi Masaharu =

Japanese samurai

Wachi Masaharu (和智 誠春; died 1568) was a Japanese samurai who served the Mōri clan.
