= Battle of Itsukushima =

1555 battle in Japan

- Part of the Sengoku period
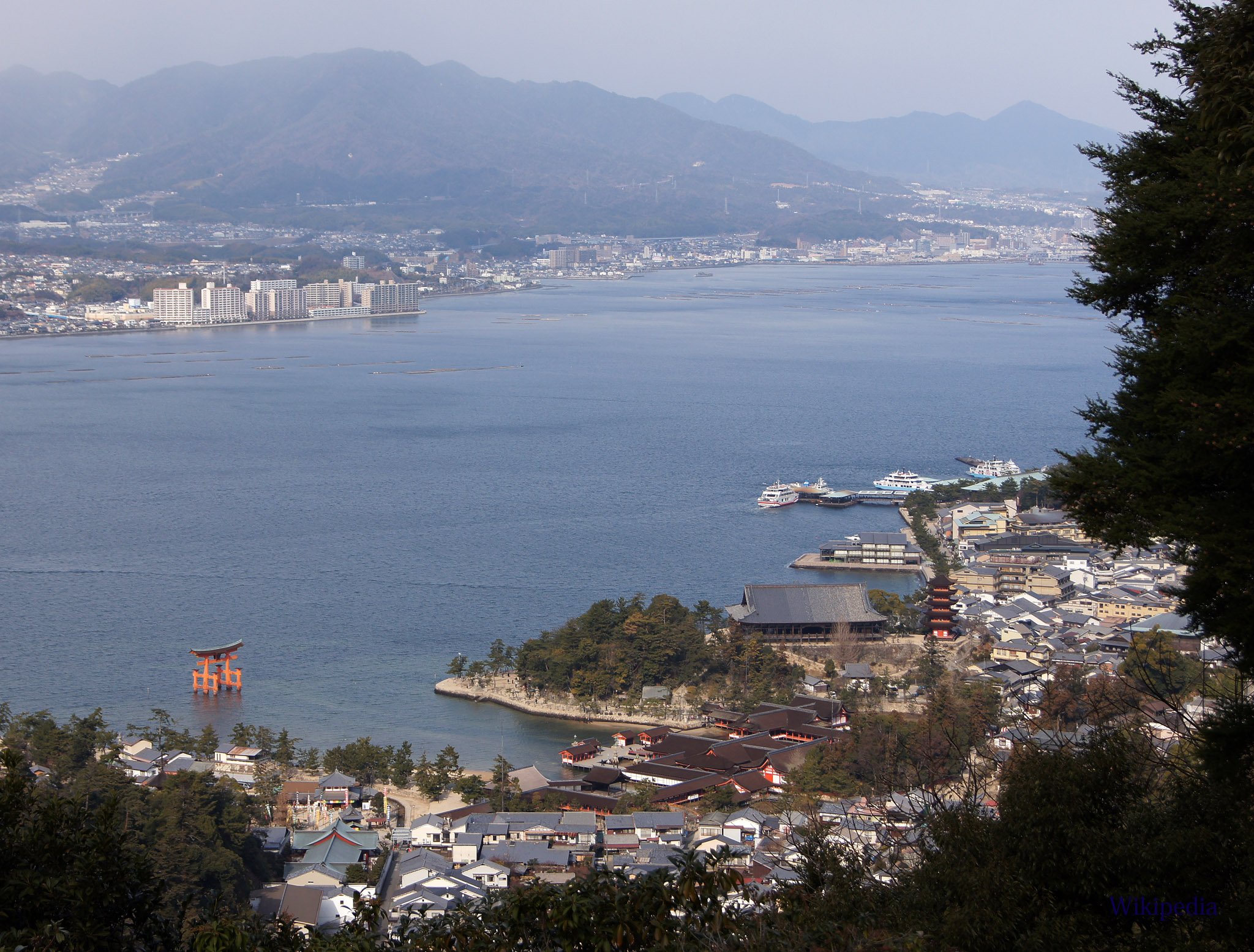
- View of Miyajima shore, with Itsukushima torii at left, and mainland in the distance (2012).
Date	16 October 1555
Location	Itsukushima, Aki Province 34°18′06″N 132°19′20″E
Result	Decisive Mōri clan victory

Belligerents
Ōuchi clan Ōtomo clan	Mōri clan

Commanders and leaders
Ōuchi Yoshinaga; Sue Harukata †; Hironaka Takakane †	Mōri Motonari; Mōri Takamoto; Kikkawa Motoharu; Kobayakawa Takakage; Fukubara Sadatoshi; Kuchiba Michiyoshi; Iida Yoshitake; Kodama Narikata; Murakami Takeyoshi

Strength
20,000–30,000	4,000–10,000

Casualties and losses
~4,700	light
- Location within Hiroshima Prefecture Battle of Itsukushima (Japan)

The 1555 Battle of Itsukushima (厳島合戦, Itsukushima Kassen), also called Battle of Miyajima, was the only battle to be fought on the sacred island of Itsukushima; the entire island is considered to be a Shinto shrine, and no birth or death is allowed on the island. Extensive purification rituals took place after the battle, to cleanse the shrine and the island of the pollution of death.

The Battle of Itsukushima was the turning point in a campaign for control of the Ōuchi clan and of Aki Province, a strategically important province for establishing control of western Honshu. It was an important step for the Mōri clan in taking the foremost position in western Japan, and cemented the reputation of Mōri Motonari as a cunning strategist.

== Background ==
In 1551, Sue Harukata revolted against his lord Ōuchi Yoshitaka in the Tainei-ji incident, forcing him to commit seppuku. Sue installed the next lord of the clan, Ōuchi Yoshinaga (younger brother of Ōtomo Sōrin), but effectively led the Ōuchi family and its armies, intent on military expansion.

In 1554, Mōri Motonari, as a vassal of the Ōuchi clan, wanted to avenge the betrayed Yoshitaka, and so he rebelled against Sue, whose territorial ambitions were depleting clan resources. The heavily outnumbered force under Mōri attacked and defeated Sue at the Battle of Oshikibata. Mōri then departed from the mainland to build a fort, known as Miyao Castle, on Itsukushima while proclaiming publicly his woe that it would not hold out long against an attack.

== Battle ==
Miyao Castle was built on a hill near Itsukushima Shrine and facing the mainland, making it a visible and tempting target. Sue commandeered a fleet of merchant vessels and prepared the troops of the Ōuchi clan to cross the channel. In the early hours of 15 October, Sue attacked Miyao Castle in an amphibious frontal assault. Meanwhile, Mōri took advantage of his absence to seize Sakurao Castle, Sue's castle on the mainland.

With an embarkation point secured, Mōri Motonari continued with his elaborate plan. He had enlisted the aid of the Noshima Murakami, a gang of local pirates led by Murakami Takeyoshi, who agreed to transport the Mōri troops to Itsukushima. The fleet carrying the Mōri forces set out in a driving thunderstorm. Their approach thus obscured, Motonari and two of his sons, Kikkawa Motoharu and Mōri Takamoto, landed on the east side of the island, to the rear of the Sue force. Meanwhile, Motonari's third son, Kobayakawa Takakage, sailed straight toward Miyao Castle in a feint, then retreated so he could be in a position to return the following day, his attack synchronized with the overland assault.

At dawn, Takakage and his 1,500 troops landed before the small fortress, and the sound of shell trumpets signaled that all units were in position and the attack commenced. As Takakage's force rushed the front gate of Miyao Castle, Mōri and his troops hit the Ōuchi position from behind. Caught completely by surprise, many of the Ōuchi troops scattered in disarray. Hundreds tried to swim to the mainland and drowned in the attempt. Many more saw that defeat was inevitable and committed seppuku.

By 18 October 1555, resistance had ended at a cost of about 4,700 deaths among the Ōuchi army. Sue Harukata escaped from the confines of Miyao Castle, but when he saw that escape from the island was not possible, he also committed suicide by seppuku. The Ōuchi clan's senior vassal Hironaka Takakane fought, together with his son, to the end, and he was also killed.

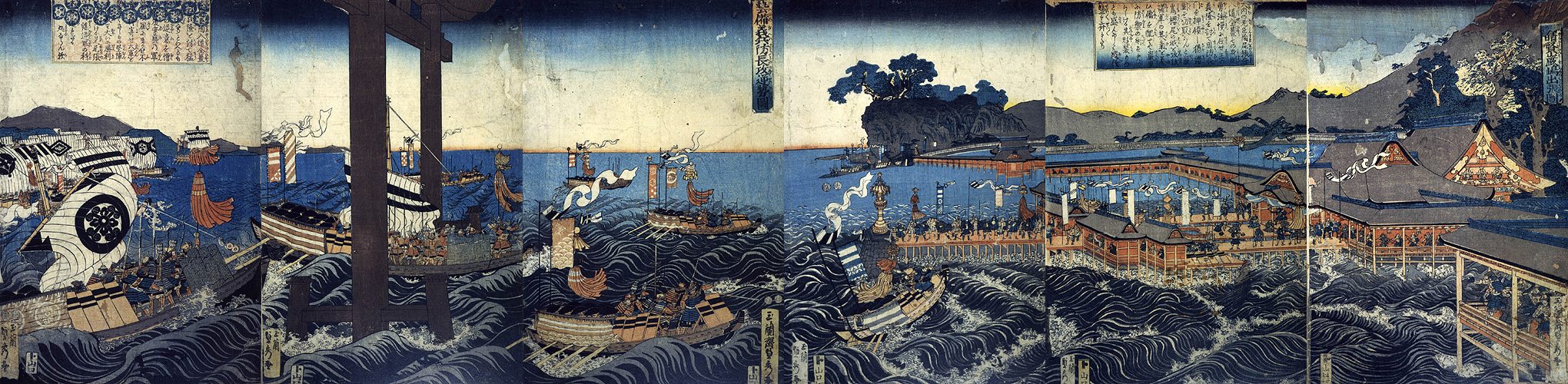
Scroll depicting the invasion by Mōri forces (ca. 1855)

== Aftermath ==
The Sue forces at Itsukushima are estimated to have been about 20,000 to 30,000 men, and though estimates of the combined forces under Mōri Motonari range widely from 4,000 to 10,000 troops, it is clear that Mōri was heavily outnumbered. This victory brought the Mōri clan into a preeminent position in western Japan, and established their reputation for strategy and naval tactics.

Immediately after the battle, Mōri Motonari ordered that the bodies of the fallen troops be removed to the mainland, and then ordered that the entire battlefield be cleansed of the blood that was spilled, to the point that buildings were scrubbed, and blood-soaked soil was removed from the island. The Mōri clan later funded several construction or renovation projects on the island. The remains of Sue Harukata were transported back to the mainland and positively identified at Sakurao Castle before being accorded a funeral and burial in the cemetery of a nearby Buddhist temple in present-day Hatsukaichi city, Hiroshima Prefecture.

== See also ==
- Ōtomo clan
