= Aki Province =

Former province of Japan

Aki 安藝國
- Province
- Map of Japanese provinces (1868) with Aki Province highlighted
- Country: Japan
- Island: Honshū
- Region: Chūgoku

Aki Province

Japanese name
- Kana: あきのくに
- Kyūjitai: 安藝國
- Shinjitai: 安芸国
Transcriptions
- Revised Hepburn: Aki no kuni

Aki Province

Japanese name
- Kana: げいしゅう
- Kyūjitai: 藝州
- Shinjitai: 芸州
Transcriptions
- Revised Hepburn: Geishū

Aki Province (安芸国, Aki no Kuni; Japanese pronunciation: [ä́.kʲì (nò̞ kɯ̈̀.ɲ̟ì)]) or Geishū (芸州) was a province in the Chūgoku region of western Honshu, comprising the western part of what is today Hiroshima Prefecture.

== History ==
When Emperor Shōmu ordered two official temples for each province (one for male Buddhist priests and one for nuns), two temples were founded in Aki Province. The provincial temple was founded in present-day Saijō, Higashihiroshima.

In the late Heian period (12th century), Aki Province became well known for the Itsukushima Shrine. Taira no Kiyomori realized the shrine's importance and donated funds for a new complex of buildings and sutra scrolls. Itsukushima (Miyajima) had a good sea port and had clear strategic significance.

In the Sengoku period, it was the original seat of the Mōri clan until 1600. In 1555, Mōri Motonari won the Battle of Itsukushima against Sue Harutaka and established his power in the western part of Honshū.

Mōri Terumoto, one of the Council of Five Elders Toyotomi Hideyoshi appointed for his son Hideyori, sided with Ishida Mitsunari before the Battle of Sekigahara in 1600, and lost Aki and many of his other domains.

After a short rule by Fukushima Masanori, in 1619, Asano Nagaakira was appointed as the daimyō of Hiroshima Domain with 420,000 koku. Until the Meiji Restoration, the Asano governed almost all the province.

Aki Province was abolished in 1871, and renamed to Hiroshima Prefecture. After some mergers the current area of Hiroshima Prefecture was established.

== Shrines and temples ==
Itsukushima jinja was the chief Shinto shrine (ichinomiya) of Aki.

== Historical districts ==
- Hiroshima Prefecture
  - Aki District (安藝郡/安芸郡)
  - Kamo District (賀茂郡) – dissolved
  - Numata District (沼田郡) – merged with Takamiya District to become Asa District (安佐郡) on October 1, 1898
  - Saeki District (佐伯郡) – dissolved
  - Takamiya District (高宮郡) – merged with Numata District to become Asa District on October 1, 1898
  - Takata District (高田郡) – dissolved
  - Toyota District (豐田郡/豊田郡)
  - Yamagata District (山縣郡/山県郡)
