= Seikōin =

Japanese noble woman (1558–1631)

Seikōin 清光院
- Born: 1558
- Died: July 19, 1631 (aged 72–73)
- Other names: Lady Minami (南の大方)
- Spouse: Mōri Terumoto
- Parent(s): Shishido Takaie; Lady Goryū
- Relatives: Shishido Motohide (brother); Two sisters
- Family: Shishido clan Mōri clan

Seikōin (清光院; 1558 - July 19, 1631) was a Japanese noble woman from the Sengoku period and early Edo period. She was the wife of Mōri Terumoto. Her father was Shishido Takaie, and her mother was the daughter of Mōri Motonari, Lady Goryū. She was also called Lady Minami (南の大方, Minami no Ōkata).

== Life ==
Seikōin was the third daughter of Shishido Takaie in 1558.

In March 1563, a betrothal with Mōri Terumoto was established, and in April 1568, a magnificent wedding was held inside the Yoshida-Kōriyama Castle. However, the engagement was once annulled by Mōri Motonari. At the time, with the Ashikaga shogunate shōgun, Ashikaga Yoshiteru, as a mediator, it was decided that Terumoto would marry Ōtomo Sōrin's daughter as a peace negotiation. Afterward, because the peace negotiation failed, the marriage between Terumoto and Sōrin's daughter was not followed through, so Terumoto and Seikōin proceeded to be wed.

Since there were no children between Seikōin and Terumoto, the latter adopted Hoida Motokiyo's child, Hidemoto, in 1585. However, Seitai-in, a concubine of Terumoto, gave birth to Mōri Hidenari in 1595. Hidemoto made another branch in the Chōfu Domain, leaving Hidenari as Terumoto's heir.

After the Mōri clan allied with Toyotomi Hideyoshi in 1590, prior to the Siege of Odawara, Seikōin went to the capital with her court ladies.

After the Battle of Sekigahara in 1600, when the Mōri clan was reduced to two provinces – Suō and Chōshū – Seikōin moved to Yamaguchi, and she moved again in 1604 to Hagi Castle. She was devoted to Shin Buddhism, and around 1604 she erected the Kōshōji Temple in Yamaguchi. Around 1608, it was moved to Hagi.

In 1631, Seikōin died in Miyano Village, Yamaguchi, at the age of 74. Her tomb is located at Tenju-in in Hagi, Yamaguchi, alongside Terumoto. Terumoto's tomb is 2.1m high, and Seikōin's is 1.8m high and large, both granite-made gorintō. Also, due to her death, Kōshōji Temple is called "Getsurinzan Seikōji" in her honor, which holds a portrait of her to this day.

== In popular culture ==
Seikōin is portrayed in the 1997 NHK Taiga drama Mōri Motonari as "Tamahime". She is portrayed by Matsumoto Rio.
