= Lady Goryū =

Japanese woman from the Sengoku period

Lady Goryū 五龍局
- Born: 1529; Tajihi-Sarugake Castle, Aki
- Died: August 2, 1574 (aged 44–45)
- Other names: Goryū (五龍); Goryūhime (五龍姫); Goryū no Kata (五龍の方); Go (五)
- Spouse: Shishido Takaie
- Children: Shishido Motohide; Two daughters Seikōin
- Parent(s): Mōri Motonari; Myōkyū
- Relatives: One older sister Mōri Takamoto (older brother); Kikkawa Motoharu (younger brother); Kobayakawa Takakage (younger brother)
- Family: Mōri clan Shishido clan

Lady Goryū (五龍局, Goryū no Tsubone; 1529 - August 2, 1574) was a woman from the Sengoku period to the Azuchi–Momoyama period. Her real name was Shin (しん). She was the second daughter of Mōri Motonari, and the wife of Shishido Takaie.

== Life ==
In 1529, Lady Goryū was born in Tajihi-Sarugake Castle, the second daughter of Mōri Motonari, daimyō of the Chūgoku region. Her mother was Motonari's wife, Myōkyū. She was the younger sister of Mōri Takamoto and the older sister of Kikkawa Motoharu. Takamoto had an older sister, but in infancy, she was adopted by the Takahashi clan (as a hostage) and later killed following their demise. Lady Goryū was loved by her parents.

In 1534, she married Shishido Takaie, the head of the Shishido clan in Aki Province. Their marriage was part of the reconciliation between Shishido and Motonari. In 1547, Takaie's eldest son, Shishido Motohide, was born. Among the children Lady Goryū had with him, her eldest daughter was married to Kōno Michinobu of Iyo Province, her second daughter married Motonaga (the eldest son of Kikkawa Motoharu), and her third daughter, Seikōin, married Mōri Terumoto; each marriage contributed to solidifying the unity of the Mōri family. There seems to have been a terrible ambiance between Lady Goryū and Lady Shinjō, Motoharu's wife, according to Motonari's Sanshi Kyokunjo.

Lady Goryū died on August 2, 1574, at the age of 46. It is believed the cause of death was a stroke. Her posthumous Buddhist name is Hōkōinden Eishitsu Myōjudaishi (法光院殿栄室妙寿大姉). The location of her grave is unknown, although there are four possible locations – two in Kōdachō Asatsuka, Akitakata, Hiroshima, one in Kōdachō Sukumoji, Akitakata, Hiroshima, and one in Ibara Shirakicho, Asakita-ku, Hiroshima. Takaie was buried along with his second wife.

== In popular culture ==
Lady Goryū is portrayed in the 1997 NHK Taiga drama Mōri Motonari as "Eno". She is portrayed by Takahashi Yumiko, and her younger incarnation is portrayed by Itō Asuka.
