= Tajihi-Sarugake Castle =

Castle in Akitakata, Hiroshima, Japan

- 多治比猿掛城
- Akitakata, Hiroshima Prefecture, Japan
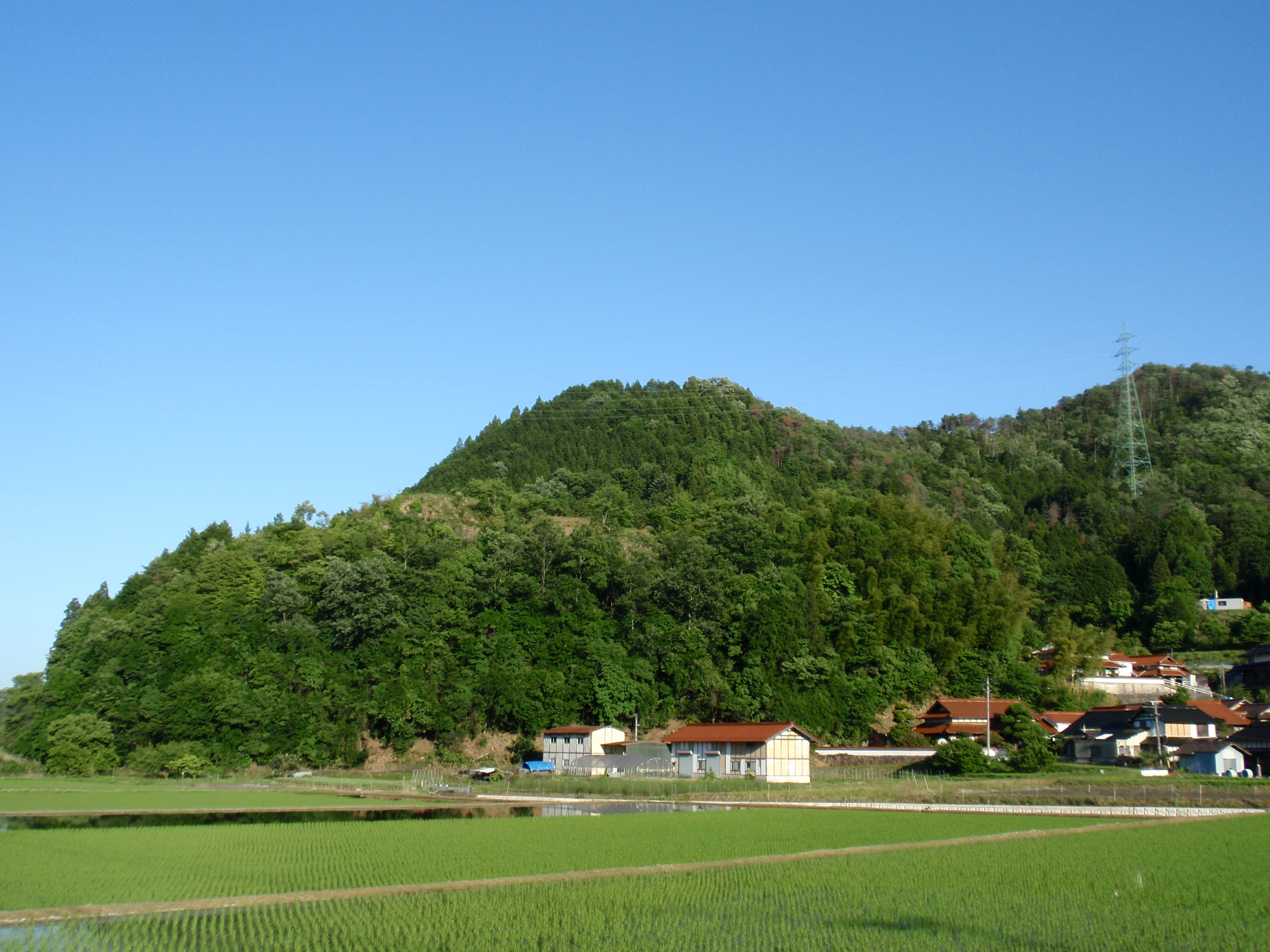
- Tajihi-Sarugake Castle

Site information
- Type: Mountaintop style Japanese castle
- Controlled by: Mōri clan

Location
- Tajihi-Sarugake Castle
- Location within Hiroshima Prefecture Location within Japan
- Coordinates: 34°40′47.6″N 132°39′51.0″E

Site history
- Built: c.1560
- Built by: Mōri Hiromoto
- In use: Sengoku period
- Demolished: c.1591

Garrison information
- Occupants: Mōri Motonari
- National Historic Site of Japan

Tajihi-Sarugake Castle (多治比猿掛城, Tajihi-Sarugake-jō) was a Japanese castle located in Akitakata, Hiroshima Prefecture. Its ruins have been protected by the central government as a National Historic Site together with Yoshida-Kōriyama Castle since 1940.

== Overview ==
The year of construction of Tajihi-Sarugake Castle is uncertain. It is assumed that it was constructed by Mōri Motonari's father Mōri Hiromoto, shortly before he retired to this location in 1560 from Yoshida-Kōriyama Castle. He was accompanied by his second son Matsujumaru (the childhood name of Mōri Motonari), and on his death in 1506, Motonari became castellan. He spent 23 years at this location has chieftain of the Tajihi Mori clan. before returning to Yoshida-Kōriyama castle as a head of Mōri clan. Motonari's son Mōri Takamoto was born in the castle in 1523 as was his daughter Lady Goryū in 1529.

Details about what happened with Tajihi-Sarugake Castle after the relocation are uncertain. It is recovered that Mōri Takamoto spent one night at the castle in 1563 when on an expedition against the Amago clan in Izumo Province, to meet with his son Mōri Terumoto. It appears that the castle was maintained as a secondary fortification for the Mōri clan until Mōri Terumoto moved clan's main stronghold to Hiroshima Castle in 1591.

== See also ==
- List of Historic Sites of Japan (Hiroshima)
