= Tōkō-ji (Hagi) =

Zen Buddhist temple in Hagi, Japan

- 東光寺
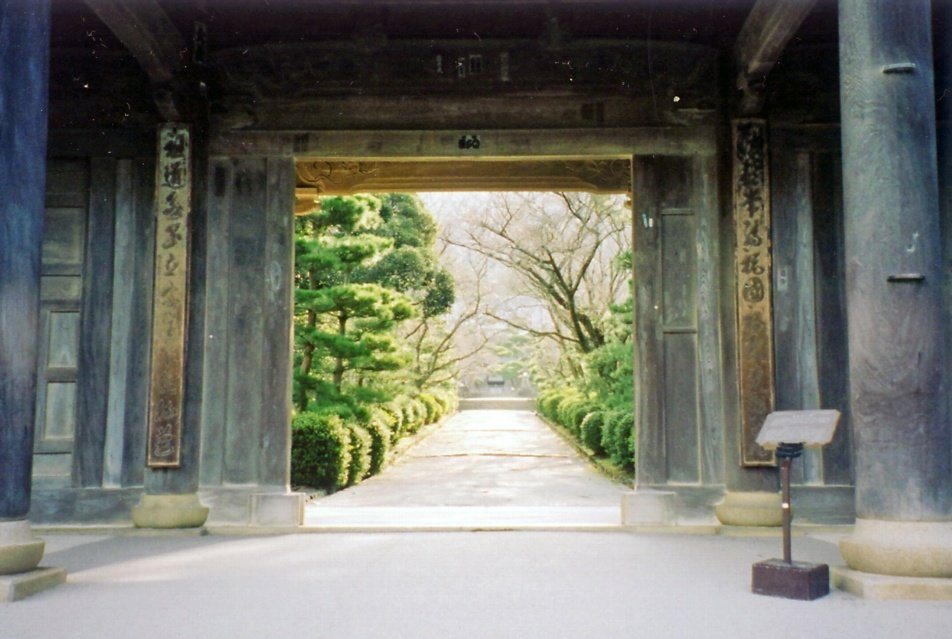
- Tōkō-ji's sanmon

- Location within Yamaguchi Prefecture Location within Japan

Religion
- Affiliation: Zen Buddhism
- Sect: Ōbaku
- Deity: Shaka Nyorai

Location
- Location: Hagi, Yamaguchi Prefecture
- Country: Japan
- Coordinates: 34°24′45.1″N 131°25′33.8″E

Architecture
- Founder: Mōri Yoshinari
- Completed: 1691

Website
- www.toukouji.net

Tōkō-ji (Japanese: 東光寺) is a Zen Buddhist temple located in Hagi, Yamaguchi Prefecture, Japan. The temple is affiliated with the Ōbaku sect of Japanese Zen and its honzon is a statue of Shaka Nyorai. It is noted for hosting the tombs of several daimyōs of the Chōshū Domain and members of the Mōri clan.

== History ==
Tōkō-ji was built in 1691 by the third daimyō of Chōshū Domain Mōri Yoshinari. Yoshinari became a devotee of the Ōbaku sect at a young age and had the temple constructed with the Ōbaku head temple of Manpuku-ji in Uji, Kyoto as his model. The Ōbaku sect, often termed the third sect of Zen Buddhism, was established in 1661 by a small faction of masters from Ming China and the architecture is highly influenced by Chinese architecture of the Ming and Qing dynasty. The layout of the temple is said to represent the shape of a dragon. Sōmon gate was built around 1693, the bell tower built around 1694, the Main Hall (Daiōhōden) was built in 1698. After his Yoshinari's death, the temple became a bodaiji of the Mōri clan.

== Mōri clan cemetery ==
Mōri Hidenari, officially the first daimyō of Chōshū Domain was buried at buried at Daishō-in, as was his son and successor Mōri Tsunahiro. However, in accordance with his wishes, Mōri Yoshinari was buried at Tōkō-ji. All subsequent odd-numbered daimyō would be buried at Tōkō-ji, whereas the even-numbered ones would continue to be buried at Daishō-in. Therefore, Tōkō-ji has the graves of five daimyō: (3) Mōri Tsunahiro, (5) Mōri Yoshimoto, (7) Mōri Shigetaka, (9) Mōri Narifusa, (11) Mōri Narimoto. There are 40 graves in the cemetery. Excluding the five daimyō graves, the rest belong to the lawful wives, concubines, and family members of the daimyō . Unlike Daisho-in, the gravestones are all square granite pillars with a height of about 4.4 meters. Each is engraved with the family crest, but not the date of death. As with Daishō-in, each group of tombs are surrounded by stone pillars and fences, and in addition to the torii gates on the approach to each of the daimyō's tombs. There is a monument in front of the daimyō's gravestones that describes his achievements during his lifetime. There are also 500 stone lanterns donated by senior vassals The approach and stone steps in the graveyard are made of basalt. Both graveyards were separated from Daishō-in and Tōkō-ji Temple in the first year of the Meiji period and became the property of the Mōri clan which continues to this day. The cemetery was designated a National Historic Site in 1981.

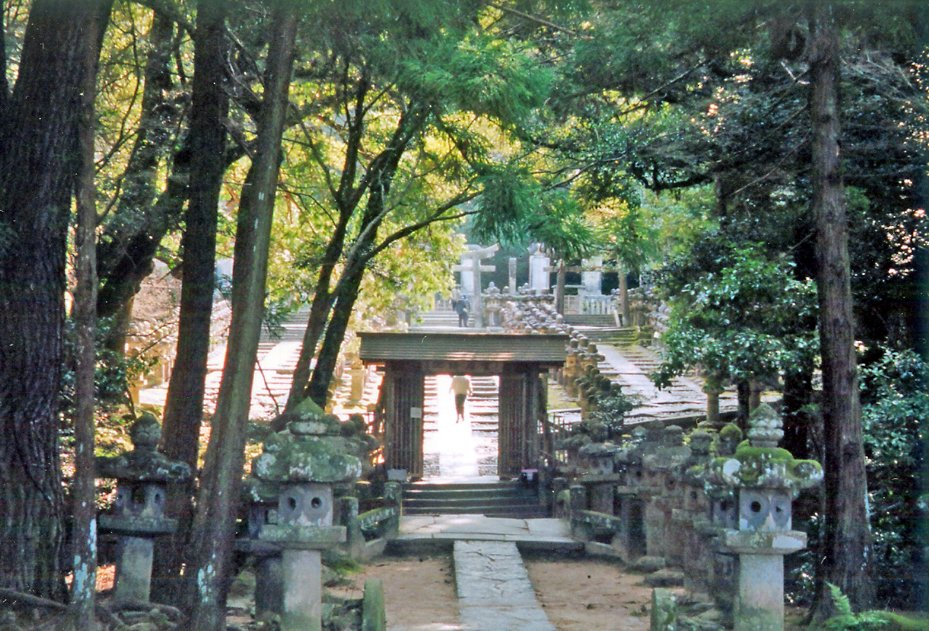
Mōri clan cemetery

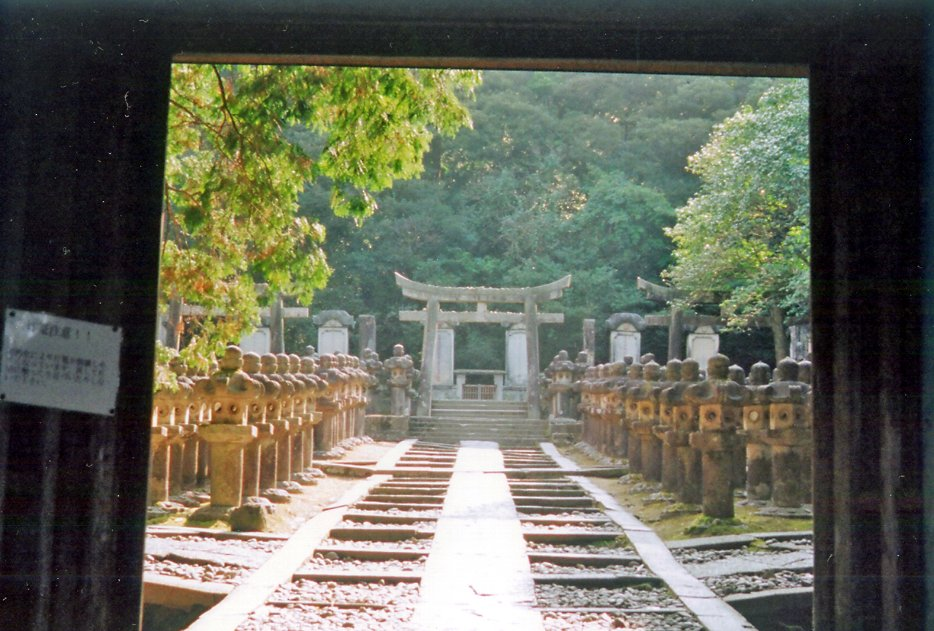
The inside from the shrine entrance

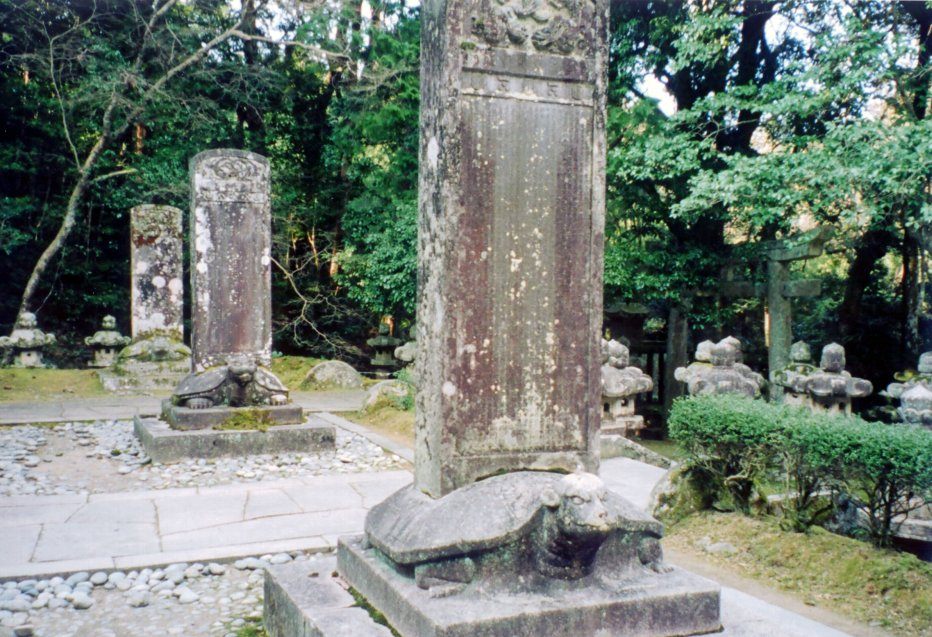
Stele standing in front of the grave

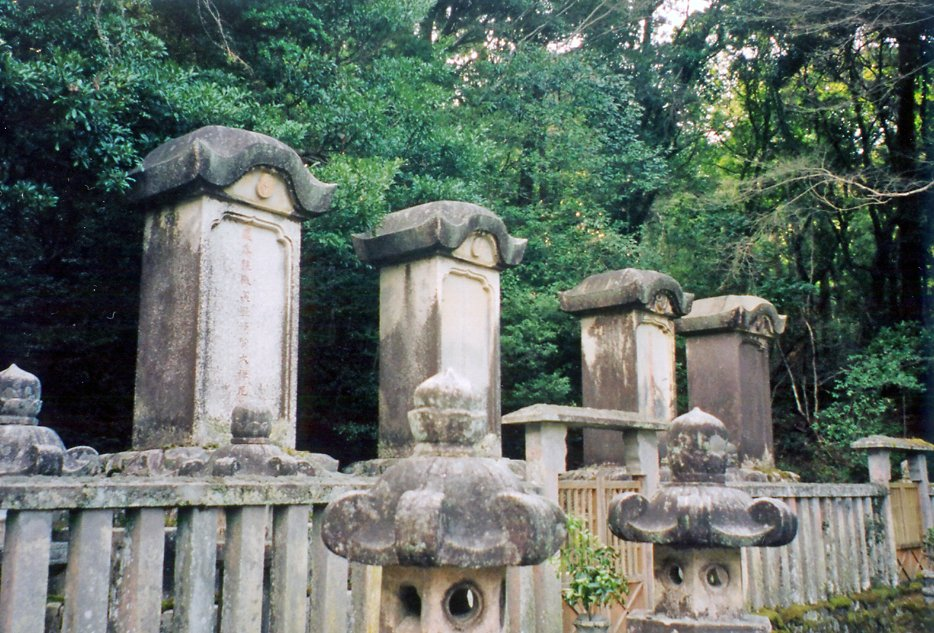
from right: 7th generation Mōri Shigenari and his wife Toyohime, 11th generation Mōri Narimoto and his wife Yumihime.。

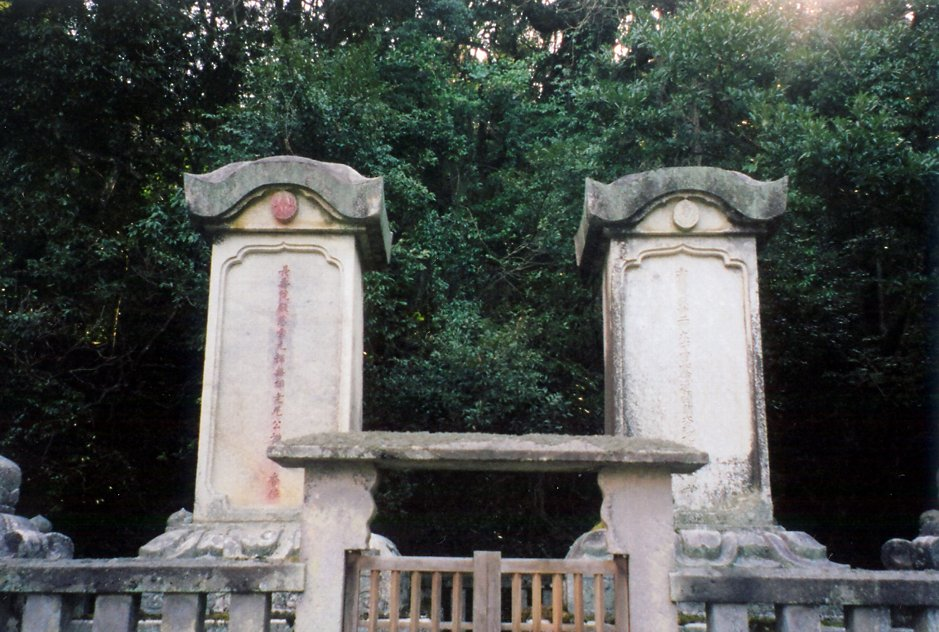
Grave of Mōri Yoshinari and his wife Kamehime

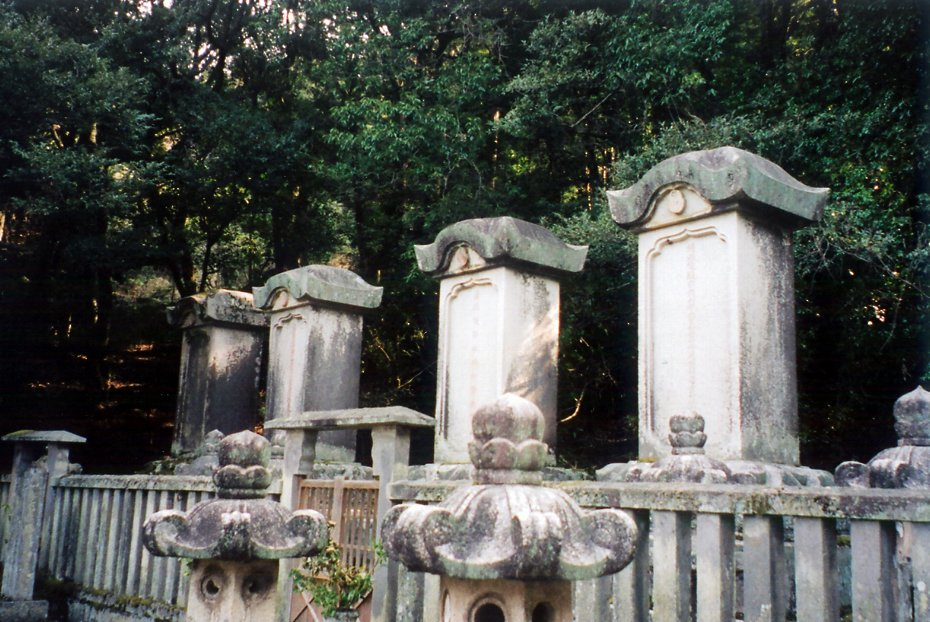
From the far right, the 9th generation Mōri Naifusa and his wife Yukihime, the 5th generation Mōri Yoshimoto and his wife Shinahime.

== Important Cultural Properties ==
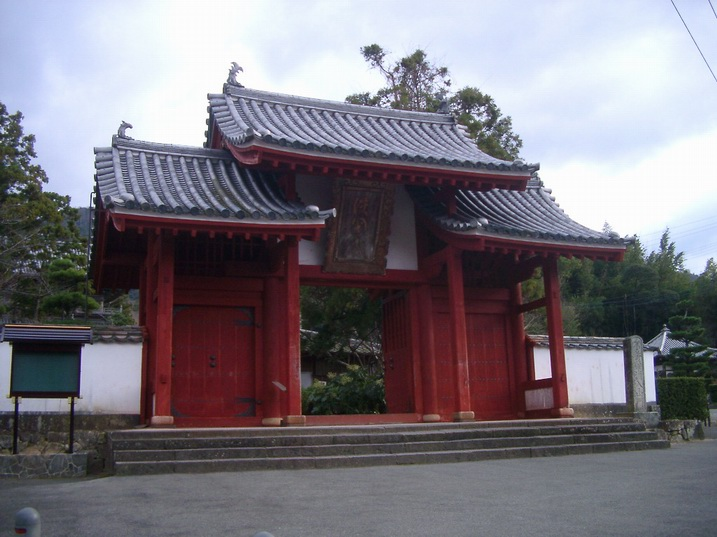
The main gate of Tōkō-ji

- Sanmon (三門) - a gate from the late Edo period (1812).
- Sōmon (総門) - a gate in the Chinese style, from the middle Edo Period (1693).
- Shōrō (総門) - a bell tower from the middle Edo Period (1696-1710).
- Daiōhōden (大雄宝殿) - a hall from the middle Edo Period (1698).

== See also ==
- List of Historic Sites of Japan (Yamaguchi)
