= Amago Katsuhisa =

- 尼子 勝久
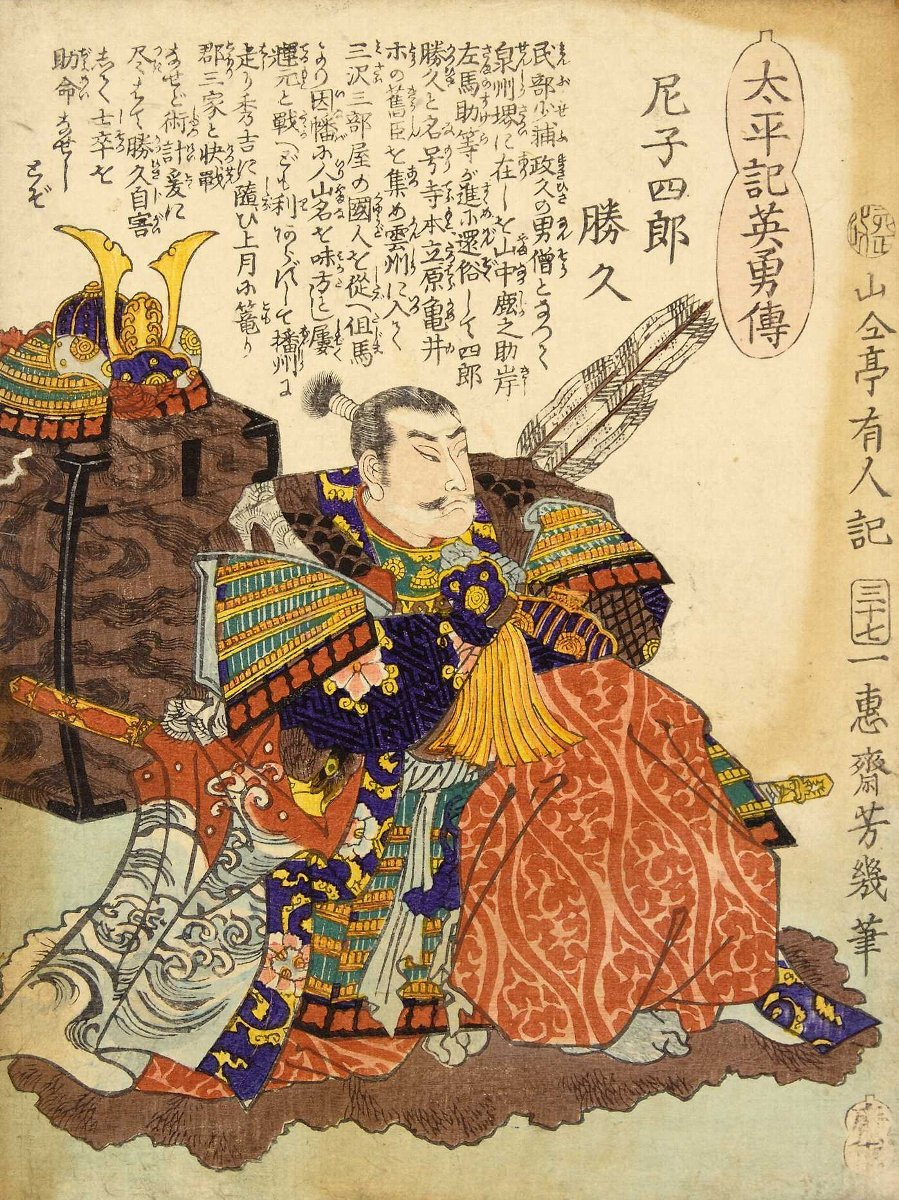
- Born: 1553
- Died: August 8, 1578 (aged 24–25)
- Military career
- Allegiance: Yamana clan Oda clan
- Units: Amago clan
- Commands: Kozuki castle
- Conflicts: Siege of Gassantoda Castle (1569); Battle of Fubeyama (1570); Siege of Kozuki Castle (1578)

Amago Katsuhisa (尼子 勝久; 1553 – August 8, 1578) was a remnant of the Amago clan, a powerful feudal clan in the Chūgoku region of Japan, backed up by Yamanaka Yukimori, a vassal of the clan.

He was born to Amago Masahisa in 1553. In the following year, Katsuhisa's father and grandfather were killed by Amago Haruhisa, leading Katsuhisa to become a Buddhist monk.

In 1566, after the Amago clan was overthrown by Mōri Motonari, Amago Katsuhisa fled to the island of Oki. Later in 1568, Katsuhisa departed from Oki Province to restore the Amago clan with support from Yamanaka Yukimori.

In 1569, Katsuhisa entered Izumo from Oki Province and set-up a base in Shinyama Castle. He besieged Gassantoda Castle, but failed, owing to a fierce defense by Amano Takashige.

In February 1570, Katsuhisa experienced a bitter defeat to Mōri Terumoto at the Battle of Fubeyama, he fleeing to Kyōto.

In 1574, Katsuhisa allied with Yamana Toyokuni to attempt an invasion to captured Tajima and Inaba provinces.

In 1578, Katsuhisa defending Kozuki Castle for Oda clan under Toyotomi Hideyoshi against the Mōri clan, but was attacked by Kobayakawa Takakage and Kikkawa Motoharu in Siege of Kōzuki Castle, he was defeated, and committed suicide.
