= Daishō-in (Hagi) =

Buddhist temple in Haji, Japan

- 大照院
- Location within Yamaguchi Prefecture Location within Japan

Religion
- Affiliation: Buddhist
- Deity: Shaka Nyorai
- Rite: Rinzai school
- Status: functional

Location
- Location: 4132 Tsubaki, Hagi-shi, Yamaguchi-ken
- Country: Japan
- Coordinates: 34°23′43.5″N 131°23′8.9″E

Architecture
- Founder: Mōri Tsunahiro
- Completed: 1654 to 1656

Website
- www.haginet.ne.jp/users/daishoin.temple/
- National Historic Site of Japan

Daishō-in (大照院) is a Buddhist temple located in the Tsubaki-chō neighborhood of the city of Hagi, Yamaguchi Prefecture, Japan. The temple belongs to the Nanzen-ji branch of the Rinzai school of Japanese Zen and its honzon is a statue of Shaka Nyorai.

== History ==
The early history of this temple is unknown. It appears that there was a temple called Getsurinzan Kannon-ji (月輪山観音寺) on this site during the Enryaku era of the Heian period (from the end of the 8th century to the beginning of the 9th century), but the circumstances surrounding its establishment and subsequent history is unknown. Towards the end of the Kamakura period, the temple was revived as a temple of the Kenchō-ji branch of the Rinzai school called Daichinzan Kanki-ji (大椿山歓喜寺), but this temple too fell into disrepair and had almost disappeared by the end of the Sengoku period. From 1654 to 1656, Mōri Tsunahiro, the second daimyō of Chōshū Domain had the temple rebuilt as a memorial temple for his father, Mōri Hidenari. The temple's name was taken from Hidenari's posthumous Buddhist name. The temple subsequently became a bodaiji of the Mōri clan. The temple was destroyed by fire in 1747, and the existing main hall was rebuilt by Mōri Munehiro, the 6th daimyō of Chōshū.

== Mōri clan cemetery ==
Mōri Hidenari, officially the first daimyō of Chōshū Domain was buried at buried at Daishō-in, as was his son and successor Mōri Tsunahiro. However, in accordance with his wishes, the third daimyō, Mōri Yoshinari, was buried at Tōkō-ji. All subsequent odd-numbered daimyō would be buried at Tōkō-ji, whereas the even-numbered ones would continue to be buried at Daishō-in. Therefore, Daishō-in has the graves of five daimyō: (4) Mōri Yoshihiro, (6) Mōri Munehiro, (8) Mōri Haruchika, (10) Mōri Narihiro, (12) Mōri Naritō.

There are 52 graves in the cemetery divided into five groups. Excluding the seven daimyō graves, 47 belong to the lawful wives, concubines, and family members of the daimyō . Unlike Tōkō-ji, the gravestones are all granite pagodas. The size of the pagoda various with the status of the person buried, with daimyō tombstones having a height of about 4.5 meters. Each is engraved with the family crest, but not the date of death. As with Daishō-in, each group of tombs are surrounded by stone pillars and fences, and in addition to the torii gates on the approach to each of the daimyō's tombs. There is a monument in front of the daimyō's gravestones that describes his achievements during his lifetime. There are also 605 stone lanterns donated by senior vassals The approach and stone steps in the graveyard are made of basalt. Both graveyards were separated from Daishō-in and Tōkō-ji Temple in the first year of the Meiji period and became the property of the Mōri clan which continues to this day. The cemetery was designated a National Historic Site in 1981.

== Important Cultural Properties ==
- Hondō (本堂) - the Main Hall of the temple, rebuilt in 1750.
- Kuri (庫裏) -the kitchen and monk's quarters from the 1750 reconstruction.
- Shōrōmon (鐘楼門) - a bell tower gate from the 1750 reconstruction.
- Shoin (書院) - a hall from the1750 reconstruction.
- Kyōzō (経蔵) - a sutra library from the1750 reconstruction.

== See also ==
- List of Historic Sites of Japan (Yamaguchi)
