= Kuchiba Michiyoshi =

Japanese samurai

- 口羽 通良
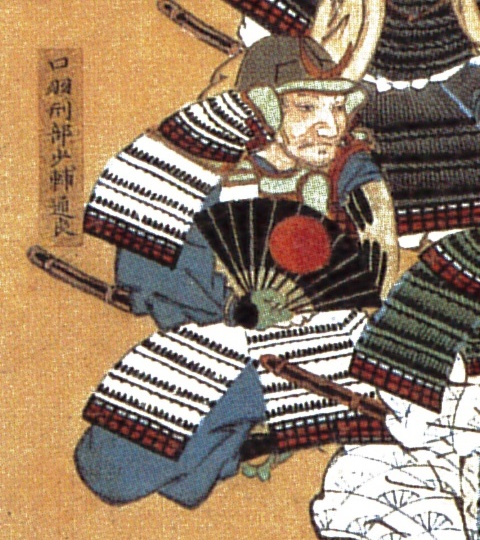
- Born: 1513; Aki Province
- Died: August 16, 1582 (aged 68–69); Ōchi
- Military career
- Allegiance: Mōri clan
- Unit: Kuchiba Clan
- Commands: Biwakō Castle, Gassantoda Castle
- Conflicts: Battle of Miyajima (1555); Battle of Shiraga (1563); Gassan-Toda Campaign (1564-1566)

Kuchiba Michiyoshi (口羽 通良; 1513 – August 16, 1582) was a Japanese samurai and commander of the Sengoku period. He was one of the most important vassal of the Mōri clan and one of the four main officers called Goyonin who supported Mōri Terumoto along with Kikkawa Motoharu, Kobayakawa Takakage and Fukubara Sadatoshi.

Michiyosi was a younger son of Shiji Motoyoshi. He served Mōri Motonari in a number of campaigns and was later a chief retainer of Môri Takamoto. Michiyoshi was married to a daughter of Fukubara Hirotoshi and his son was Kuchiba Haruyoshi.

In 1530, he was given Ōchi domain, strategically important place to rule and he built a castle called Biwakō Castle in there. He was also the keeper of Gassantoda Castle.

He was fought in the Battle of Miyajima (1555), Battle of Shiraga (1563), and the Gassan-Toda Campaign (1564-1566). He was in charge of the conquest of mainly the San'in region.

His grave is at Shūrinji Temple near the Biwakō Castle.
