= Siege of Kōzuki Castle =

Siege of Kozuki Castle in Japan

- Part of the Sengoku period
Date	1578
Location	Kōzuki Castle, Harima Province
Result	Mōri victory

Belligerents
forces of Mōri Terumoto; Ukita clan	force loyal to Oda Nobunaga; Amago clan

Commanders and leaders
Kobayakawa Takakage; Kikkawa Motoharu; Ukita Tadaie	Amago Katsuhisa †; Yamanaka Yukimori (surrendered) X

The siege of Kōzuki Castle (上月城の戦い, Kōzuki-jō no Tatakai) occurred in 1578, when the army of Mōri Terumoto attacked and captured the castle of Kōzuki in Harima Province. Kōzuki had been taken by Toyotomi Hideyoshi the previous year and entrusted to Amago Katsuhisa. When it fell to the Mōri, Amago committed hara-kiri. Amago's loyal and heroic general Yamanaka Yukimori was captured and executed.

== Background ==
Oda Nobunaga was running out of qualified battle-hardened lords to hold his territories, so Amago Katsuhisa though a member of the Amago clan samurai class, who was not especially experienced or trained as a warrior, he was called to become lord of Kōzuki castle from Kyoto, where he was studying to be a Buddhist monk.

== Siege ==
Mōri Terumoto sent the Mōri's "Two Rivers", Kobayakawa Takakage and Kikkawa Motoharu to attack Kōzuki castle. The Amago forces under Yamanaka Yukimori were so vastly outnumbered and surrounded in the castle that victory was impossible. Yukimori sent a message to the Mōri general offering to surrender, and offering the ritual suicide of his master (Amago Katsuhisa). The offer was accepted, Amago forces surrendered, and Katsuhisa committed suicide.

== Aftermath ==
Katsuhisa was very young, in his early twenties, when he died. A memorial stone stands with his name engraved, along with Buddhist inscriptions, where he killed himself.

It is popularly believed in Japan that Yamanaka Yukimori, Amago's general, "sold" Amago's life, for the safety of his own.

What precisely happened to Yamanaka Yukimori after the battle is unclear. Though some sources say he died in the battle, others state that he became a vassal of the enemy lord, Mōri Terumoto, but was assassinated on Mōri's order (along with his new wife).
