= Mōri Terumoto =

Japanese daimyō

- 毛利 輝元
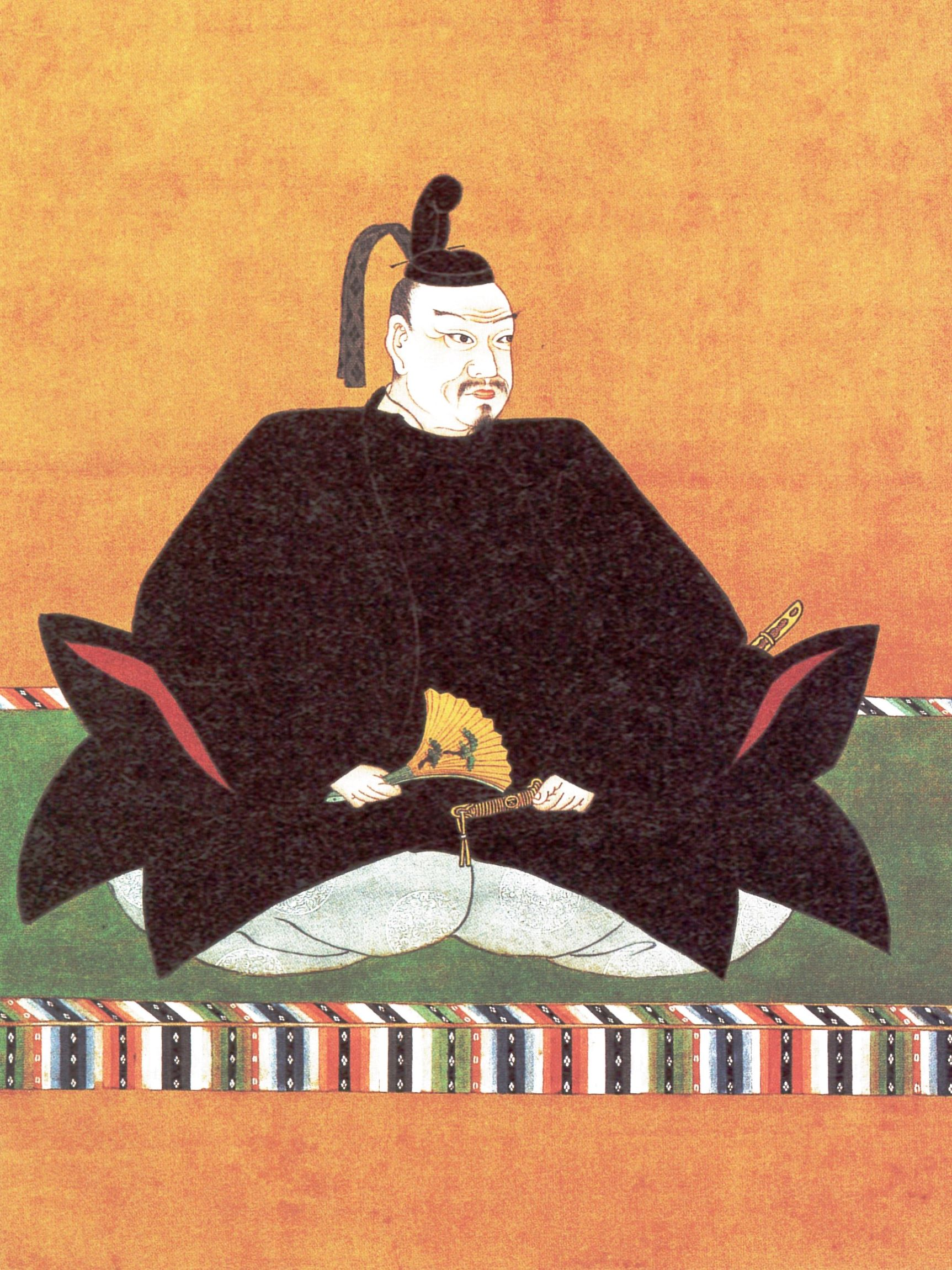

Head of Mōri clan
- In office 1566–1623
- Preceded by: Mōri Takamoto
- Succeeded by: Mōri Hidenari

Personal details
- Born: Kōtsurumaru (幸鶴丸); January 22, 1553 Yoshida, Aki Province, Japan
- Died: June 2, 1625 (aged 72) Yoshida, Aki Province, Japan
- Spouse(s): Seikōin; Seitaiin; Omatsu; Osen; Otsu; Osana
- Relations: Mōri Motonari (grandfather); Kikkawa Motoharu (uncle); Kobayakawa Takakage (uncle); Mōri Hidemoto (adopted son); Komahime (adopted daughter, Kobayakawa Hideaki's wife)
- Children: Mōri Hidenari; Takehima; Mōri Naritaka
- Parents: Mōri Takamoto (father); Lady Ozaki (mother)

Military service
- Allegiance: Mōri clan Toyotomi clan Western Army; Tokugawa shogunate
- Rank: Daimyō (Lord)
- Unit: Mōri clan
- Commands: Hiroshima Castle
- Battles/wars: Battle of Fubeyama (1570); Ishiyama Hongan-ji War (1576-1580); Korean Campaign (1592-1593); Sekigahara Campaign (1600)

Mōri Terumoto (毛利 輝元, January 22, 1553 – June 2, 1625) was a Japanese daimyō. The son of Mōri Takamoto, and grandson and successor of the great warlord Mōri Motonari, he fought against Oda Nobunaga but was eventually overcome. He participated in Toyotomi Hideyoshi's Korean Campaign (1592) and built Hiroshima Castle, thus essentially founding Hiroshima.

== Early life ==
Mōri Terumoto was born 'Kotsumaru' in 1553, as the eldest son of Mōri Takamoto at Aki Yoshida Koriyama Castle, the residence of the Mōri clan. His mother, Ozaki no Tsubone, was a daughter of Naito Okimori, a senior vassal of the Ouchi clan and Nagato Shugodai, and was also the adopted daughter of Ouchi Yoshitaka. From May 1554 until October 1555, the Mōri clan defeated Sue Harukata in the Battle of Itsukushima. After that, the Mōri clan annihilated the Ouchi and Sue clans. Therefore, his father, Takamoto, was constantly on the battlefield and never settled down with Terumoto.

When his father, Mōri Takamoto, suddenly died in 1563, Terumoto was selected as his heir. but his grandfather, Motonari, became his supervisor and the one who actually carried out political and military affairs of the Mōri clan.

In 1564 at what appears to have been an early manhood ceremony, Kotsumaru took the name Terumoto (Teru coming from the shogun, Ashikaga Yoshiteru) and assumed command.

In 1566, the Mōri's traditional rival, the Amago clan, had been destroyed, and Motonari had left instructions that the clan be content with what it had and forego expansionist adventure. To a greater or lesser extent, Terumoto followed his late grandfather's instructions. Aside from skirmishes on Kyushu and gradual penetration further east. The first years of Terumoto's rule passed quietly.

In October 1569, Ōuchi Teruhiro, a remnant of the former lord of the Ōuchi clan, invaded Suō Province with reinforcements from the Ōtomo clan. disrupting the control of the Mōri clan's territory. In order to deal with the invasion of the remnants of the Ouchi clan led by Teruhiro, the Mōri clan withdrew their troops deployed in Kyushu and defeated Teruhiro and the remnants of the Ouchi clan that same month. However, this rebellion by Ouchi Teruhiro put Takahashi Akitane in Chikuzen province at a disadvantage, and he was forced to surrender the following year, despite the fact that he had promised in the joint pledge signed by Terumoto, Motonari, Motoharu, and Takakage that "the Mōri clan would not abandon Akitane. The Mōri clan lost its influence in Chikuzen Province and also lost its bases in Buzen Province, leaving only a few castles such as Moji Castle, and the influence of the Mōri clan in Kitakyushu was greatly weakened.

Later in 1570, Mōri Terumoto along with his generals 'Kobayakawa Takakage' and Kikkawa Motoharu defeated Amago Katsuhisa at Battle of Fubeyama or Battle of Nunobeyama, and forced Amago Katsuhisa fled to the island of Oki. After Terumoto had put down the rebellion led by Ouchi Teruhiro, he set out with a large army from Yoshida Koriyama Castle together with Motoharu and Takakage to defeat the remnants of the Amago clan forces.

When Motonari died in 1571, Terumoto inherited an enormous kingdom that stretched from Buzen on Kyushu to the borders of Harima and Bizen, a powerful navy (at the time Japan's finest), and the support of two gifted uncles Kobayakawa Takakage and Kikkawa Motoharu.

== Conflict with Nobunaga ==
Mōri Motonari left a testament saying, "There is no need for further territorial expansion. We must not get entangled in central conflicts". However, conflict with Oda Nobunaga, who sought to expand his dominion, began, within three years after Motonari's death.

In December 1573, Nobunaga acknowledged Uragami Munekage, a key figure in anti-Mōri forces, with control over Bizen, Mimasaka, and Harima. This decision provoked resistance from influential local figures such as Bessho and Kodera. When Munekage's vassal, Ukita Naoie took advantage of this situation and initiated a rebellion, the Mōri supported him.

Furthermore, the Mōri clan intervened in the Ishiyama Hongan-ji War and gradually escalated their confrontation with Nobunaga.

Terumoto turned to the vaunted Môri navy. In 1576, First Battle of Kizugawaguchi Nobunaga's 'admiral', Kuki Yoshitaka, had cut the Honganji's sea-lanes and sat in blockade off the coast. Terumoto ordered his fleet, commanded by Murakami Takeyoshi, to make for the waters off Settsu and, once there, the navy inflicted an embarrassing defeat on Kuki and opened the Honganji's supply lines.

In 1577, Hideyoshi captured Kozuki Castle in Harima and gave it to Amago Katsuhisa, who, supported by the famed Yamanaka Shikanosuke, hoped to restore the defunct Amago clan to power in Izumo. Perhaps goaded by the mere name of the new defender of Kozuki as much as anything else. In 1578, Terumoto sent his uncles to laid Siege of Kōzuki Castle. This they did, and both Katsuhisa and Shikanosuke were killed.

Later in 1578, Second Battle of Kizugawaguchi, Kûki Yoshitaka defeat Takeyoshi and drove the Mōri away. A further attempt by the Mōri to break the blockade the following year was turned back, and in 1580 the Honganji surrendered.

After Hongan-ji surrender, this allowed Nobunaga to concentrate on the Mōri and he sent two sizable contingents westward into the Chugoku region. Hashiba Hideyoshi was to march along the southern portion of the arm (the Sanyodo) while Akechi Mitsuhide moved into the upper provinces (the Sanindo).

By this time, Ukita Naoie had already defected to the Oda clan, and the Mōri clan found themselves in a difficult military situation.

By 1582 a Mōri defeat seemed inevitable. Hideyoshi had forced his way into Bitchu province and laid siege to Takamatsu Castle. Shimizu Muneharu (a former Mimura retainer) defended Takamatsu stoutly, but its loss would all but open the way into Bingo and Aki, the Mōri homeland. Hideyoshi knew that Takamatsu would be a tough nut to crack and that heavy losses would only benefit the Mōri, so he resorted to a stratagem. Diverting the waters of a nearby river, he flooded the castle grounds, making Takamatsu a soggy island. By now Terumoto had brought up a relief force, but hesitated to attack Hideyoshi directly. Shimizu, for his part, responded to an offer by Hideyoshi that would spare the lives of his men, and committed suicide after ordering his men to surrender.

== Service Under Hideyoshi ==
After the death of Nobunaga at Honnoji Incident in 1582, and probably most relieved at Hideyoshi's evident generosity, Terumoto agreed, to make peace and allowing Hideyoshi to speed home and defeat Akechi Mitsuhide before anyone else was the wiser for it. As frustrated as the Mōri may have been by their discovery of the truth, they did not break the truce, and in time became Hideyoshi's closest supporters.

In 1583 he became a vassal of Toyotomi Hideyoshi. Terumoto sent the 'Two Rivers' (Kobayakawa and Kikkawa) to lead troops for Hideyoshi in his Invasion of Shikoku (1585) and Kyushu Campaign (1587). He sent ships to assist Hideyoshi in his reduction of the Hojo at Siege of Odawara (1590).

When Hideyoshi invaded Korea in 1592, Terumoto himself led the "7th Division" with 30,000 troops there, although much of his time seems to have been taken up fighting Korean partisans at Gyeongsang Province.

In 1599, Terumoto made a Kishômon (blood oath ritual) with Ieyasu to pledge loyalty each others, the content of the oath that both Terumoto and Ieyasu "would never betray each others and act as if they both are biological brothers".

Terumoto was a member of the council of Five Elders appointed by Hideyoshi. At the height of his power in late 16th century, Terumoto controlled 1.2 million koku. This means he could mobilize more than 40,000 men to a battle. He sided on Ishida Mitsunari, one of Hideyoshi's Go-Bugyo, to fight against Tokugawa Ieyasu as the "General Commander", but was not present at the Battle of Sekigahara, the leadership on the battlefield was led by Ishida Mitsunari. Terumoto was at Osaka Castle defending Toyotomi Hideyori at the time and later surrendered to Ieyasu soon after Mitsunari defeat at Sekigahara. Ieyasu reduced Terumoto's domains, leaving him only Nagato and Suō Provinces, worth 369,000 koku in total.

== After Sekigahara ==
In August 1614, tensions between the Edo Shogunate and the Toyotomi clan rose due to the issue of the inscription on the bell of the Great Buddha Hall of the Hokoji Temple. The Toyotomi clan called the Mōri clan to join their side. However, Terumoto declined the invitation.

The Toyotomi clan also failed to convince the Mōri clan under the lead of Mōri Terumoto to join their side. Terumoto instead rather supporting the Tokugawa shogunate, as on November 3, Terumoto ordered his vassals Mōri Motochikazu and Motoyuki Sugimori, who were in charge of Mōri Hidemoto's absence, to send half of the troops east if Hidemoto asked them to march out to aid the shogunate fought the Toyotomi, while the remaining half, including Sugimori, Motoyoshi Nishi, and Shichirobei Misawa, were to stay in Chofu as caretakers, and to retreat to Hagi if something happened that would make it impossible to maintain Chofu. On November 9, Kikkawa Hiroie, daimyo of Iwakuni, Suō Province, informed Terumoto's aide Motoi Ihara of the situation in the Kamigata region and urged Terumoto to march out. The following day, on November 10, Terumoto entrusted the management of his home province to Masuda Motoyoshi and Yamada Motomune,[note 9] and marched out of Hagi on November 11, traveling eastward by sea from Mitajiri, Suo Province. Later, when Tokugawa Hidetada arrived at Fushimi on November 10, Sakai Tadayo, Doi Toshikatsu, and Ando Shigenobu, who were following Hidetada, requested Hidenari and Hidemoto in Edo to march out, and the Mōri clan joined the attack on Osaka Castle from both the home province and Edo.

During the Summer Siege of Osaka, some of the former vassals of the Mōri clan, such as Naito Motomori (Sano Michika), Karasuda Tsuji, Koda Masatane, and Kasai Shigemasa, joined the Toyotomi side. (Note: There is theory those were instructed by Terumoto himself in effort to secure the Mōri clan's interest in case of the victory of Toyotomi clan. However, according to Hori Tomohiro's research, this theory is not credible, and Motomori was banished by Terumoto in 1589 (Tensho 17), and as a ronin with nowhere to turn, Motomori laid siege to Osaka as "Sano Michika" without the approval of Terumoto. On the other hand, Waki Masanori claims that documents related to the incident are in various places and it is impossible to fabricate them all, and that from a letter dated July 6, 1614 from Motomori's older brother, Shishido Mototsugu ("Mōri Family Documents" No. 1329), he infers that Motomori had been secretly borrowing money from the Mōri family and therefore could not refuse the request.) After the Siege of Osaka and the fall of the castle, Motomori was arrested in the outskirts of Kyoto in May. He was interrogated by Yagyū Munenori, an Ometsuke official in charge of the investigation, about the suspicion that Motomori had entered Osaka Castle on Terumoto's orders, but Motomori claimed that he had entered the castle on his own initiative, and committed suicide on the 21st, which resulted in the suspicion against the Mōri clan being dropped. After that, Naito Motomori's sons Naito Motochika and Awaya Mototoyo met with Ieyasu, and were allowed to return to Japan after explaining that they had no connection with Motomori. However, Terumoto forced the two to commit suicide and imprisoned Naito Motochika's son Motonobu.

In 1616, on July 19, Terumoto married his only daughter, Takehime, to Kikkawa Hiromasa. Two days before, on July 17, two days before the wedding of Yoshikawa Hiromasa and Takehime, Terumoto sent a letter with the following contents to Kikkawa Hiroie, and upon receiving the letter, Hiroie immediately replied to Ihara Motoi and Enomoto Motoyoshi that he accepted the gist of the letter:

This marriage proposal is for the sake of our territory and the future of the Mōri and Kikkawa families. Takehime was born with a weak constitution, so we raised her freely, thinking that it would be fine if she just grew up. Because of this, she has developed a short-tempered personality, which surprises Hiroie and may displease Hiromasa. However, I would like you to bear with me for the sake of the family. If you still cannot bear it, please consult Terumoto in secret. Terumoto is already prepared for this, so please feel free to speak up. If there is any consultation, Terumoto will thoroughly explain the matter to Takehime. If that is not enough, he will apologize to Hiroie in private. In the unlikely event that Hiromasa and Takehime become estranged, people will say all sorts of things to Terumoto and Hiroie and Hiromasa, but this will lead to evil deeds, so in that case, we will have a direct discussion and investigate the matter. As Motonari has said, we will not treat the Kikkawa family carelessly.

=== Death ===
Finally, his behavior caused resentment among some of his vassals, which led him to retire. He was succeeded by Mōri Hidenari. Terumoto died on June 2, 1625 (aged 72) at Yoshida, Aki Province.

== Personal info ==
He was known as a great patron of Hagi ware pottery.

- Father: Mōri Takamoto (毛利隆元, 1523–1563)
- Mother: Ozaki no Tsubone (尾崎局, 1527–1572), daughter of Naitō Okimori (内藤興盛).
  - Main Wife: Seikōin (清光院, 1558–1631), daughter of Shishido Takaie (宍戸隆家).
  - Concubine: Seitaiin (清泰院, 1572–1604)
    - First Son: Mōri Hidenari (毛利秀就, 1595–1651)
    - First Daughter: Takehima (竹姫, 1600–1644), wife of Kikkawa Hiromasa (吉川広正).
    - Second Son: Mōri Naritaka (毛利就隆, 1602–1679)
  - Concubine: Omatsu (於松, ?–1641), fourth daughter of Hane Yamashiro-no-kami Motoyasu (羽根山城守元泰).
  - Concubine: Osen (於千, 1550–1658), daughter of Inoue Kawachi-no-kami Narimasa (井上河内守就正).
  - Concubine: Otsu (於鶴, ?–1677), daughter of Hanafusa Tarozaemon Yasuyuki (花房太郎左衛門尉某).
  - Concubine: Osana (於さな, ?–1644), daughter of Kodama Kozaemon Noritomo (児玉小左衛門真友).
  - Adopted Children:
    - Daughter: Komahime (古満姫, ?–1651), second daughter of Shishido Motohide (宍戸元秀). Wife of Kobayakawa Hideaki (小早川秀秋).
    - Son: Mōri Hidemoto (毛利秀元, 1579–1650), first son of Mōri Motokiyo (毛利元清) who was fourth son of the famous Mōri Motonari.

It is also said that Terumoto had a concubine who acted as an assassin.

=== Vassals ===
Four senior vassals who supported Terumoto'

- Fukubara Sadatoshi
- Kuchiba Michiyoshi
- Kikkawa Motoharu
- Kobayakawa Takakage

== Appendix ==
=== Bibliography ===
- Hori, Tomohiro (2013). "Mōri Terumoto and the Siege of Osaka". In Hirofumi, Yamamoto; Arata, Hori; Yuji, Sone (eds.). Destroying the False Image of Hideyoshi. Kashiwa Shobo. ISBN 9784760142170.
- Kuwata, Tadachika (1989). 『新編 日本武将列伝 6』 [New Edition Japanese Warriors Biography 6]. 秋田書店.
- Mitsunari, Junji (2016). 毛利輝元 西国の儀任せ置かるの由候. ミネルヴァ日本評伝選. ミネルヴァ書房. ISBN 978-4623076895.
- Sankyoden Editorial Office; Watanabe Seisuke (1982). 毛利輝元卿伝. マツノ書店.（first published in 1944）
- Waki Masanori (2016). "萩藩成立期における両川体制について". In Mitsunari Junji (ed.). 吉川広家 [Yoshikawa Hiroie]. シリーズ・織豊大名の研究, 4. 戎光祥出版. ISBN 9784864032155.（First published: 藤野保先生還暦記念会編『近世日本の政治と外交』/ Politics and Diplomacy of early modern Japan," edited by the 60th Birthday Memorial Committee of Professor Fujino Tamotsu, 1993, 雄山閣, ISBN 4639011954。）
- Tokiyama, Yahachi (1916). 稿本もりのしげり 国立国会図書館デジタルコレクション [Manuscript of Mori no Shigeri National Diet Library Digital Collection]. 時山弥八.https://dl.ndl.go.jp/info:ndljp/pid/969141*

Preceded by New Creation	(Mōri) Lord of Hiroshima; 1589–1600	Succeeded by Fukushima Masanori
Preceded by New Creation	1st (Mōri) Lord of Chōshū ????–1623	Succeeded by Mōri Hidenari
