= Sieges of Gassantoda Castle =

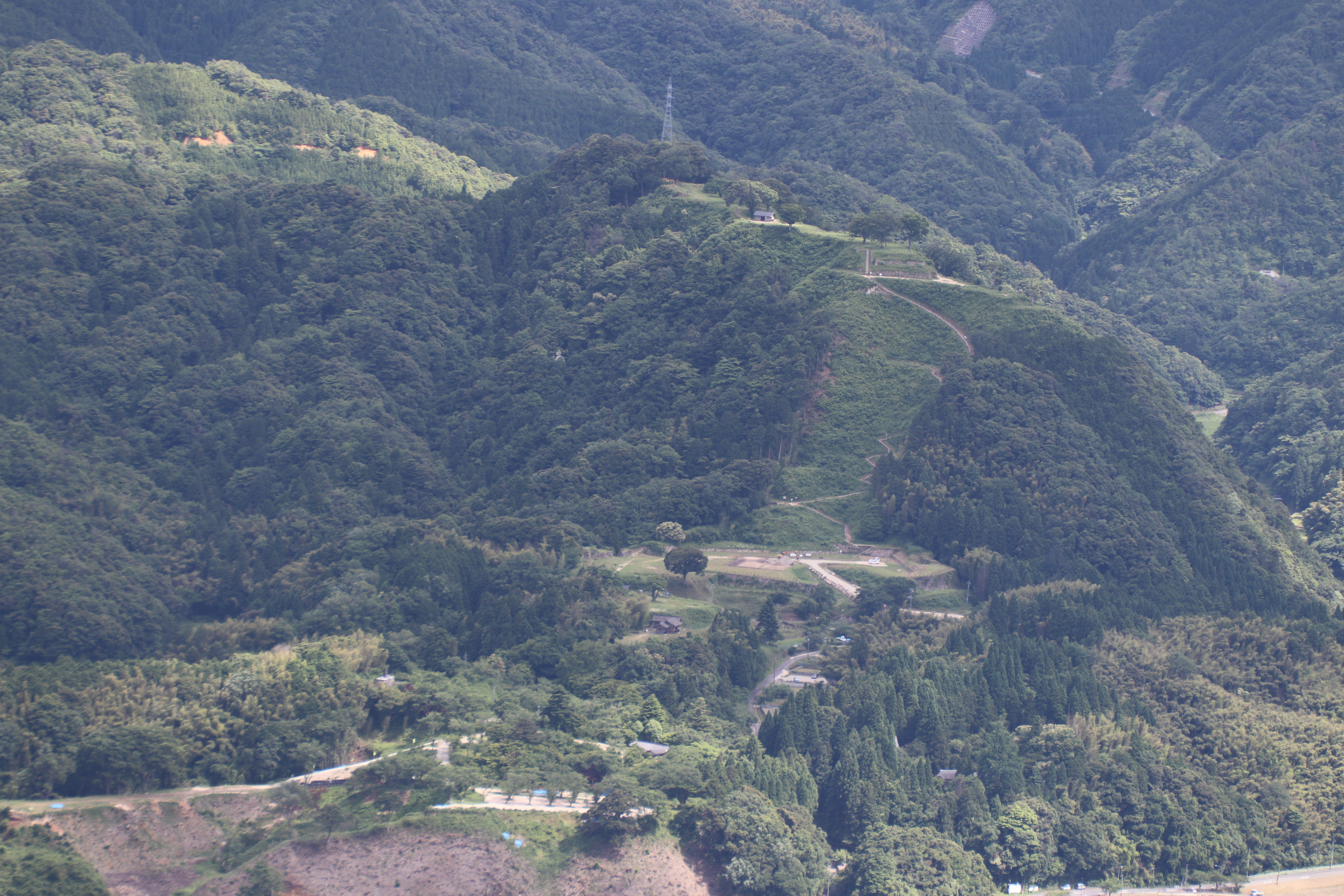
Former site of Gassantoda Castle

The sieges of Gassantoda Castle (月山富田城の戦い, Gassan Toda-jō no Tatakai) were a series of 16th-century battles during the Sengoku period of Japan.

== First Siege (1542) ==
Siege of Gassantoda Castle (1542)
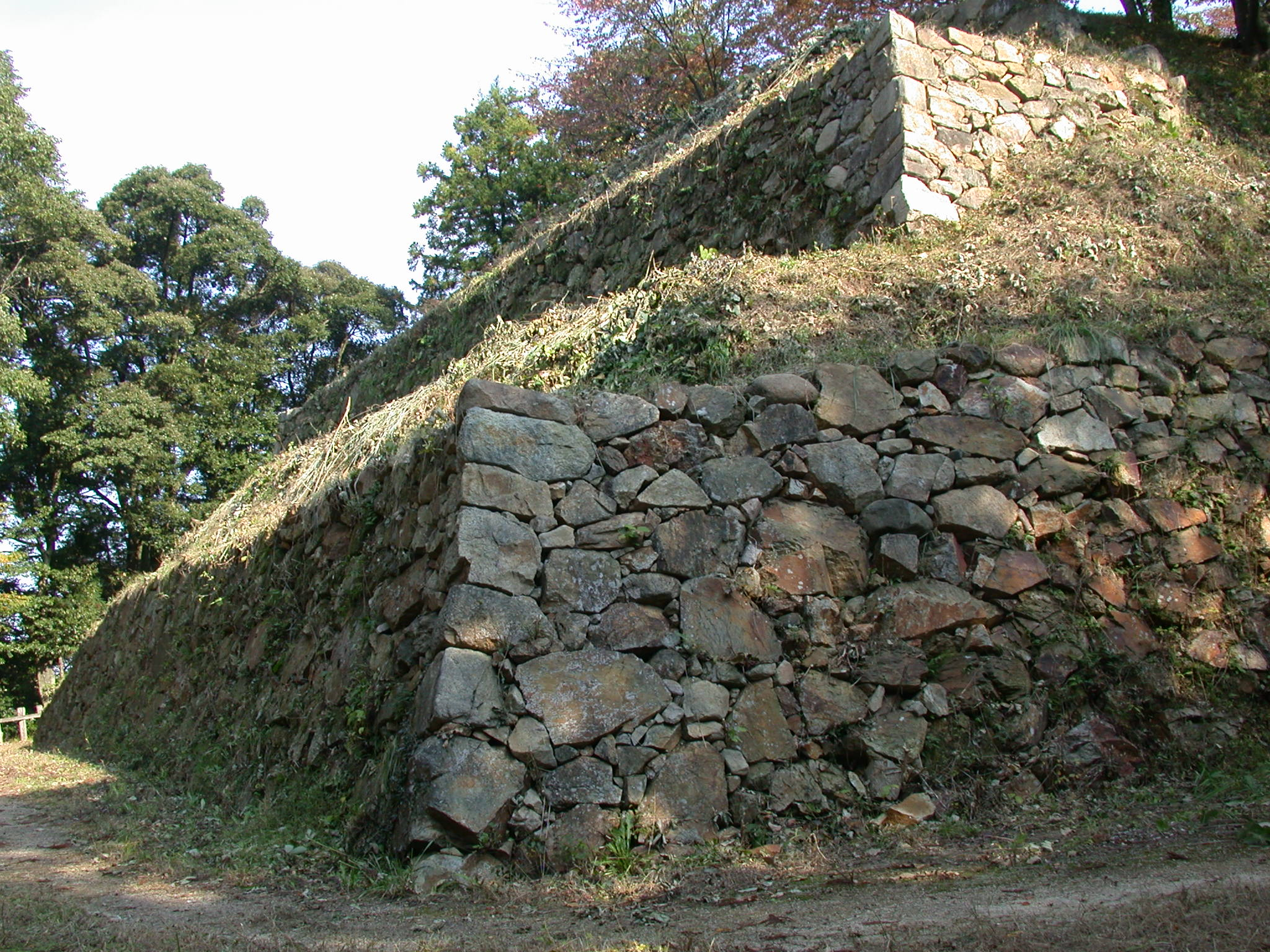
- Sannomaru walls
Date	1542–1543
Location	Gassantoda Castle, Izumo Province 35°21′49″N 133°10′58″E
Result	Amago clan victory

Belligerents
Amago clan	Ōuchi clan Mōri clan

Commanders and leaders
Amago Haruhisa	Ōuchi Yoshitaka; Mori Motonari; Hironaka Takakane
- Location within Shimane Prefecture Sieges of Gassantoda Castle (Japan)

The siege of the castle was personally led by Ōuchi Yoshitaka against Gassantoda Castle located within Izumo Province, under the control of Amago Haruhisa.

In this battle Mori Motonari penetrated deep into the Amago clan territory, but their supply line was broken and Kikkawa Okitsune (吉川興経) betrayed them. Motonari surrounded Gassantoda castle (富田城) but the Ōuchi troops retreated. During the retreat Motonari almost lost his life, but his general, Watanabe Hajime tried to sacrifice his life, so he could get away by fighting to the death. Motonari returned safely to Aki Province.

After a long, hard-fought siege, Haruhisa ended in victory, and as a result of the battle, the power of the Ōuchi clan weakened.

Yoshitaka, who had failed in his attempt, withdrew to his headquarter Yamaguchi, in which he indulged himself with "more and more in pleasures", until he was deposed by his retainer, Sue Harukata, in the Tainei-ji incident.

== Second Siege (1565) ==
Siege of Gassantoda Castle (1565)
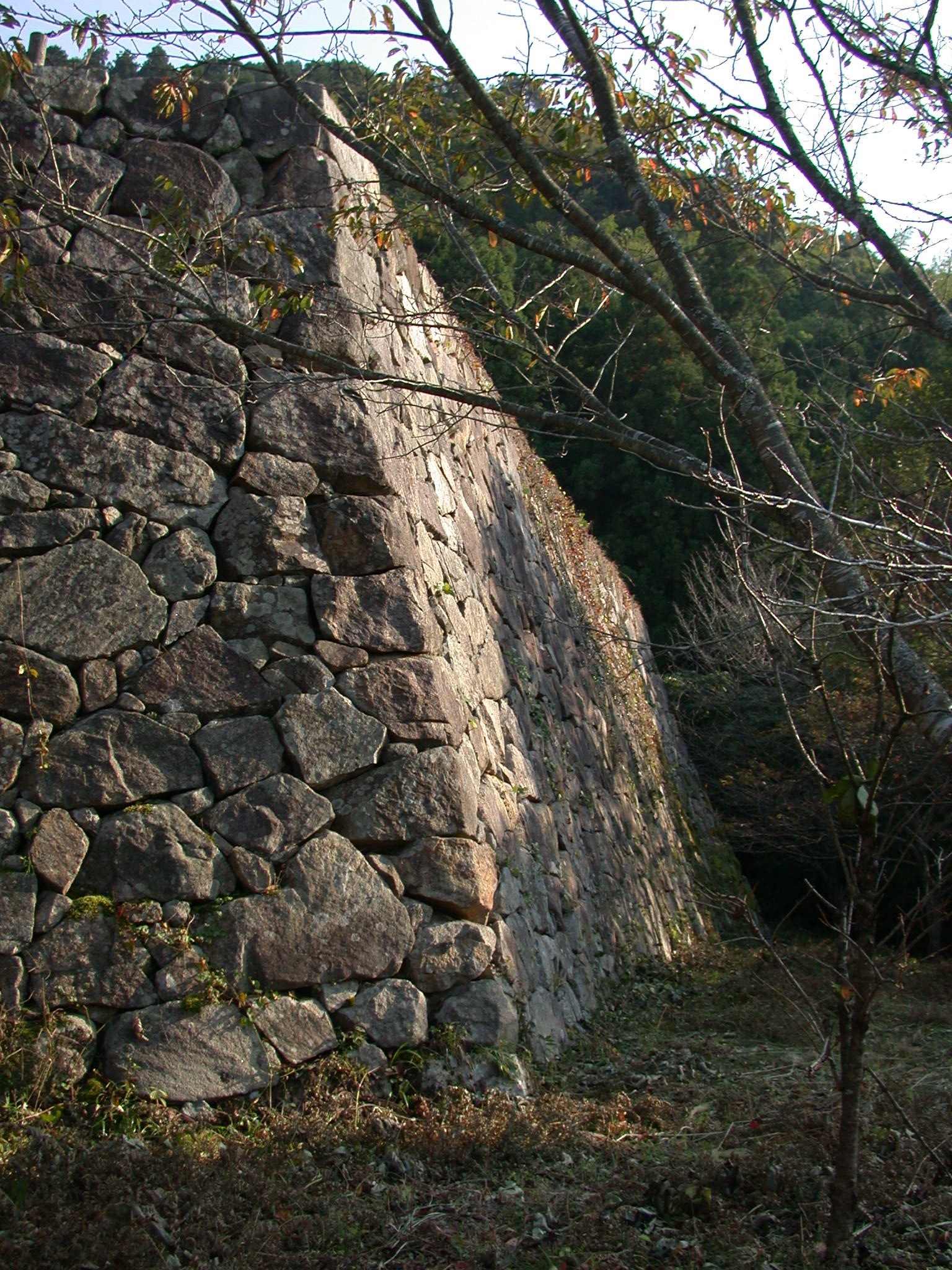
- Karamente Walls
Date	1565–1566
Location	Gassantoda Castle, Izumo Province
Result	Mōri clan victory

Belligerents
Amago clan	Mōri clan

Commanders and leaders
Amano Yoshihisa; Amago Tomohisa; Uyama Hisakane	Mōri Motonari; Kikkawa Motoharu; Kobayakawa Takakage

== Third Siege (1569) ==
Siege of Gassantoda Castle (1569)
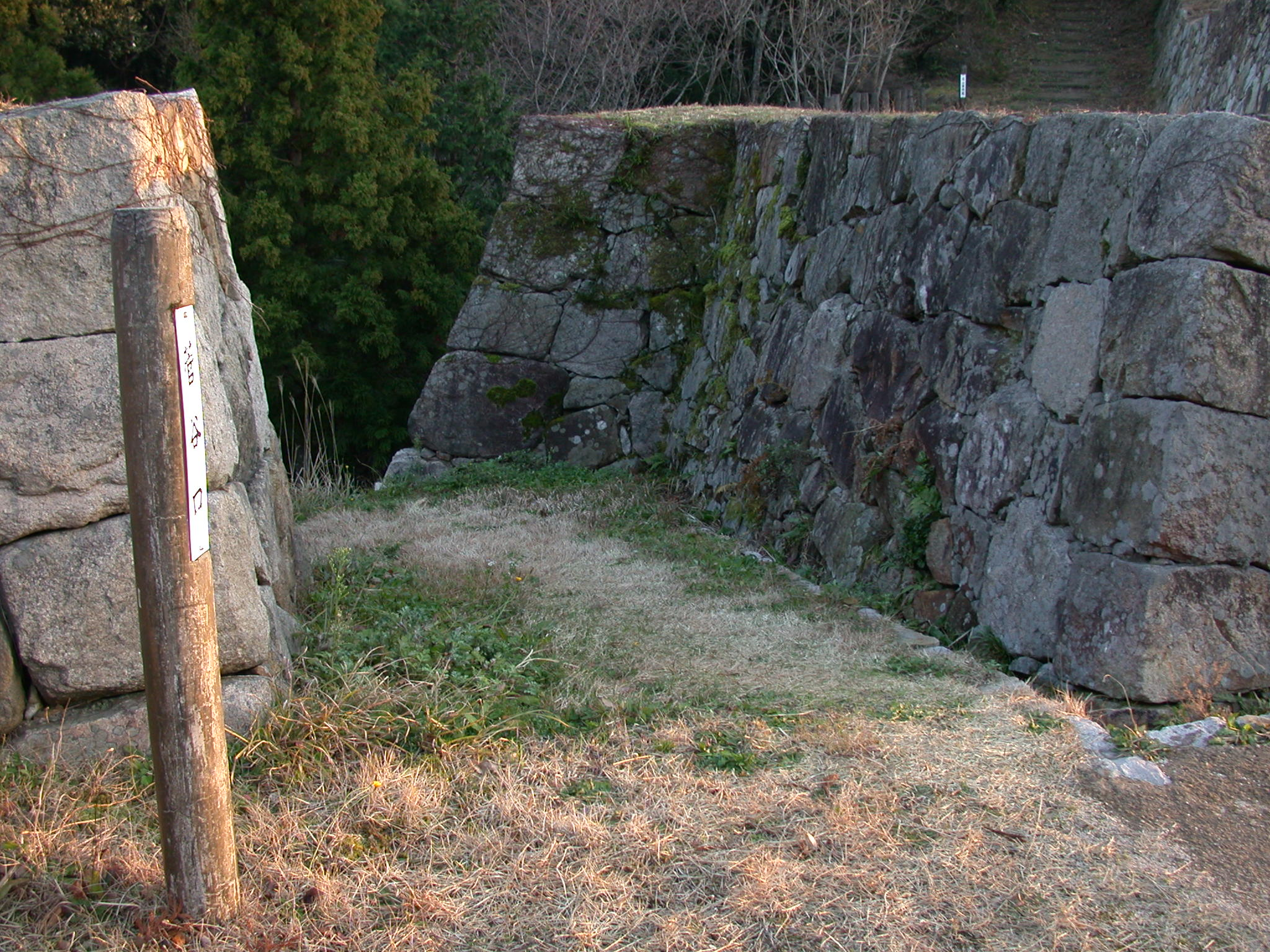
- Sugatani Gate
Date	1569
Location	Gassantoda Castle, Izumo Province
Result	Mōri clan victory

Belligerents
Mōri clan	Amago clan

Commanders and leaders
Amano Takashige	Amago Katsuhisa; Yamanaka Yukimori; Tachihara Hisatsuna
