= Gassantoda Castle =

Castle in Yasumi, Shimane, Japan

- 月山富田城
- Yasugi, Shimane Prefecture, Japan
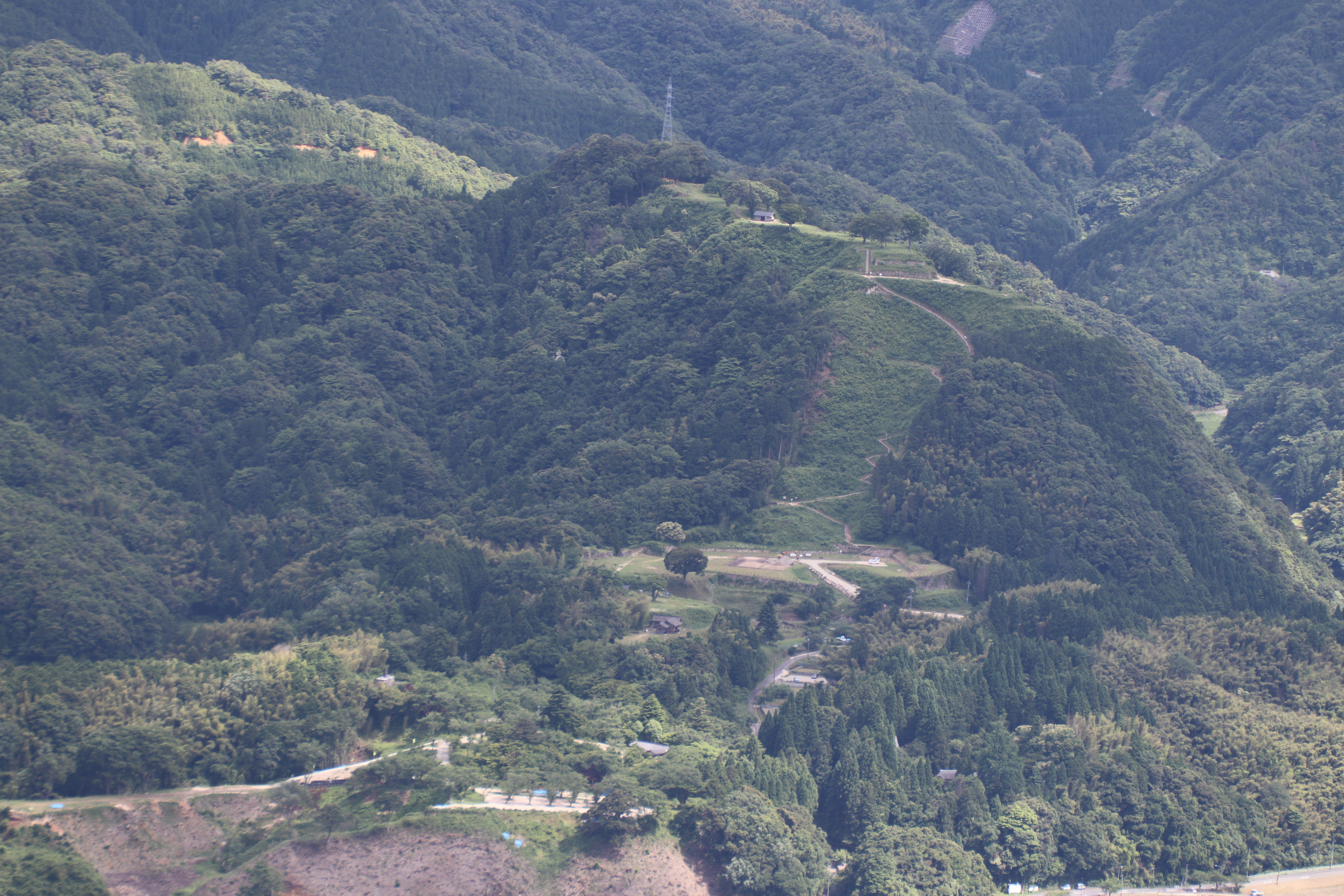
- Former site of Gassantoda Castle

Site information
- Type: Japanese castle
- Controlled by: Amago clan (1396–1566), Mōri clan (1566–1600), Horio clan (1600–1611)
- Condition: Ruins

Location
- Coordinates: 35°21′49″N 133°10′58″E

Site history
- Built: 1396; 630 years ago
- Built by: Sasaki Yoshikiyo
- Demolished: 1611; 415 years ago

Garrison information
- Past commanders: Amago Haruhisa, Amago Yoshihisa, Kuchiba Michiyoshi, Amano Takashige, Kikkawa Hiroie
- National Historic Site of Japan

Gassantoda Castle (月山富田城, Gassantoda-jō) was a Sengoku period yamajiro-style Japanese castle located in Izumo Province, in what is now part of the city of Yasugi, Shimane Prefecture in the San'in region of far western Japan. Its ruins have been protected by the central government as a National Historic Site since 1934. Gassantoda Castle was built using the whole of Gassan's ridges and valleys, and is regarded as one of the five largest and most important medieval mountain castles along with Kasugayama Castle (Niigata), Nanao Castle (Ishikawa), Odani Castle and Kannonji Castle (Shiga).

== History ==
Gassan Toda Castle (月山富田城) is located on Gassan, which is 180 meters tall some 20 kilometers from the mouth of the Hirose River at eastern edge of current Shimane prefecture. The area was an important center from ancient times for the production of tatara steel, which was essential in the production of Japanese swords, and Gassan occupies a central location in the transportation routes of Izumo Province. During the Kamakura period, the Kamakura shogunate awarded the Sasaki clan control over Izumo and Oki Provinces, and the cadet branch of the Sasaki which eventually controlled Izumo during the Muromachi period was the Kyōgoku clan. The Kyōgoku established their stronghold on Gassan, which appears to have already had an ancient fortification from the Heian period. However, the Kyōgoku were soon overthrown by one of their vassals, Amago Tsunehisa, who through a combination of cunning and ruthlessness, expanded his territory by confiscating lands of temples, shrines and his weaker neighbors. He and captured Gassantoda Castle by leading his army into the castle disguised as festival dancers during a celebration and then launching a surprise attack on the defenders. From 1510 to 1540, Amago Tsunehisa began to expand his territory into neighboring provinces, conquering all of parts of Iwami, Hōki, Bingo, Bitchu, Mimasaka and part of Harima Province. Following the weakening of the powerful Ōuchi clan to the west due to a revolt by their general Sue Harukata, the Amago clan seized the Iwami Ginzan Silver Mine. However, the power of the Amago clan was fragile, and was based largely on personal loyalty to Amago Tsunehisa. After his death in 1540, his successor, Amago Haruhisa could not command the same loyalty, and local lords began to defect to the Ōuchi, or to the rising power of the Mōri clan. In 1542, he was trapped in Gassantoda Castle during the Siege of Toda Castle by an Ōuchi army. Although the Ōuchi could not take the castle after a year and a half, the damage to Amago's prestige was very great. Gassantoda Castle was attacked by the Mōri clan in 1566, after several failed assaults and a prolonged siege, it fell to Mōri Motonari, ending the Amago clan as a force in the Izumo region. This victory confirmed Motonari's rise to the position of the most powerful warlord in western Japan, and the castle would become one of several castles in the region occupied by the Mōri. The castle was assigned to Kikkawa Motoharu, one of Motonari's sons and the regional commander of the San'in region. Under the Kikkawa, the castle was upgraded with stone walls.

After the Battle of Sekigahara in 1600, the Mōri clan was deprived of much of their territory, including Izumo Province. The Tokugawa shogunate awarded it to his general Horio Tadauji as the seat of the Matsue Domain. Tadauji died in 1604 and his father Horio Yoshiharu, while serving as regent for Tadauji's son and successor Horio Tadaharu, commissioned the construction of Matsue Castle in 1607. Yoshiharu relocated the seat of Matsue Domain to the new castle upon its completion in 1611, and Gassantoda Castle was subsequently abandoned and demolished. The ruins of the castle are now a park. Gassantoda Castle was listed as one of Japan's Top 100 Castles by the Japan Castle Foundation in 2006.

The castle site is a 60 minute bus ride from JR West San'in Main Line Yasugi Station to Gassan-Iriguchi bus stop, and 40 minutes from hillside entrance to hilltop castle ruins.

== Gallery ==
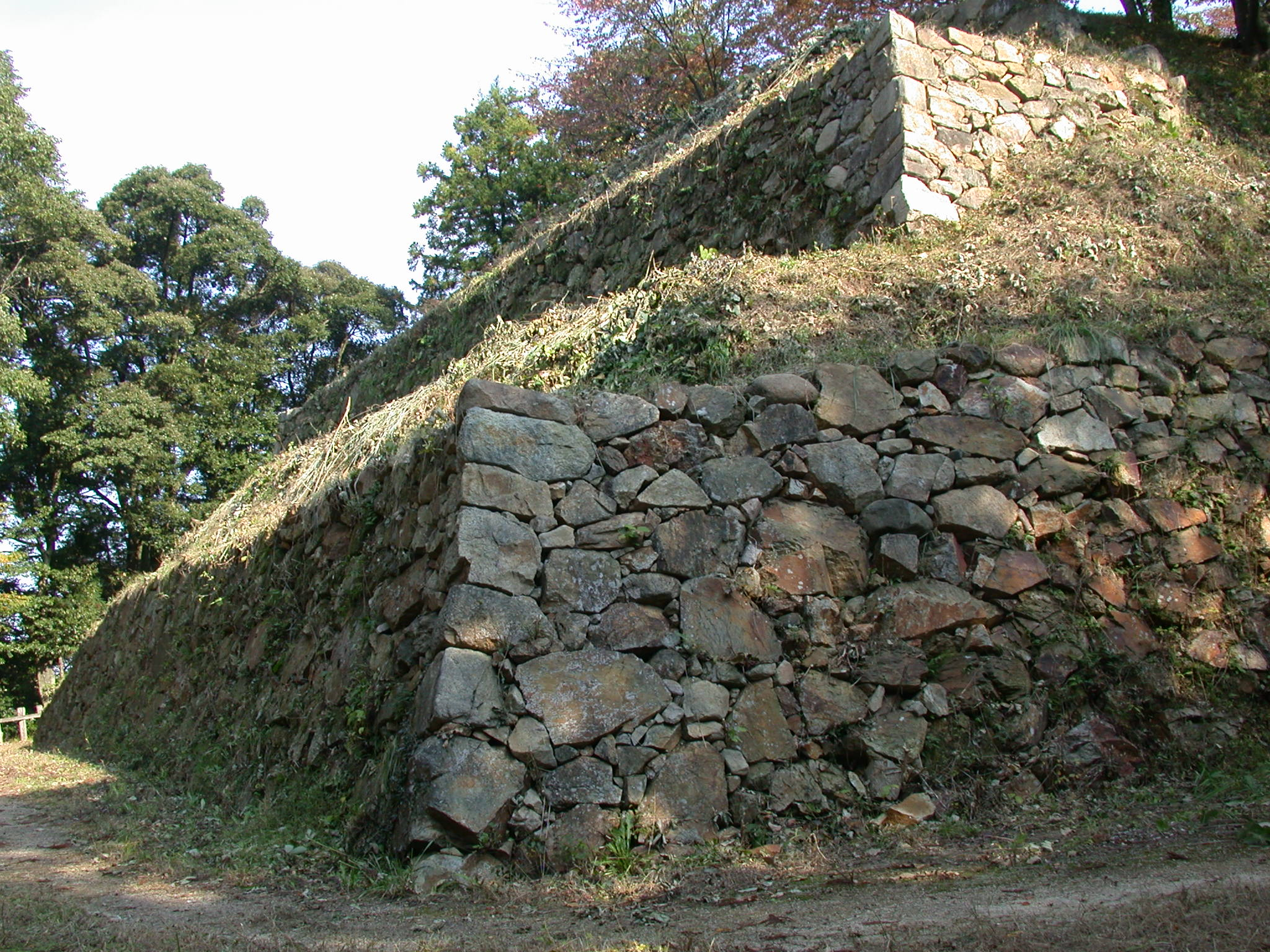
Sannomaru walls

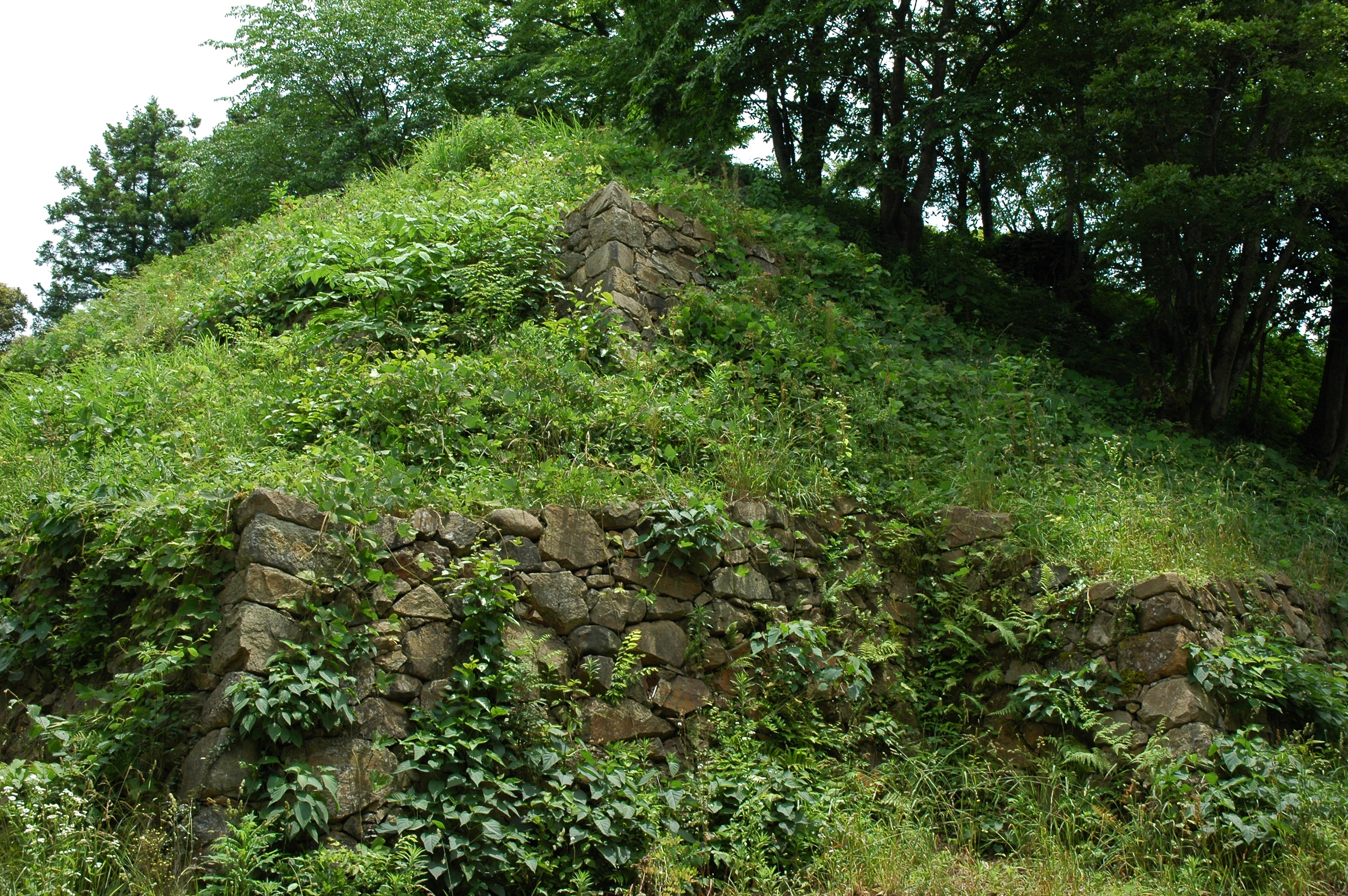
Overgrown ruins

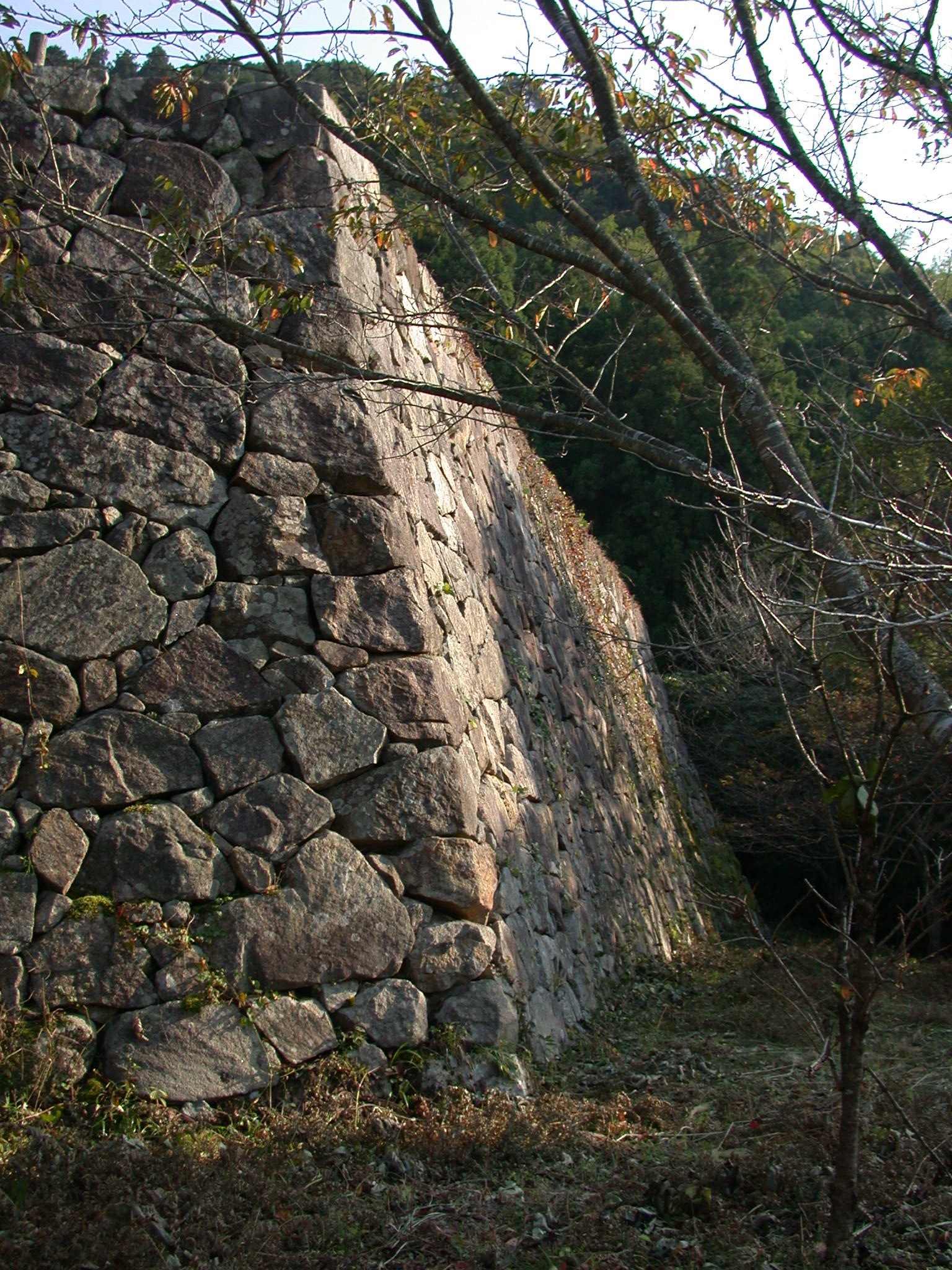
Karamente Walls

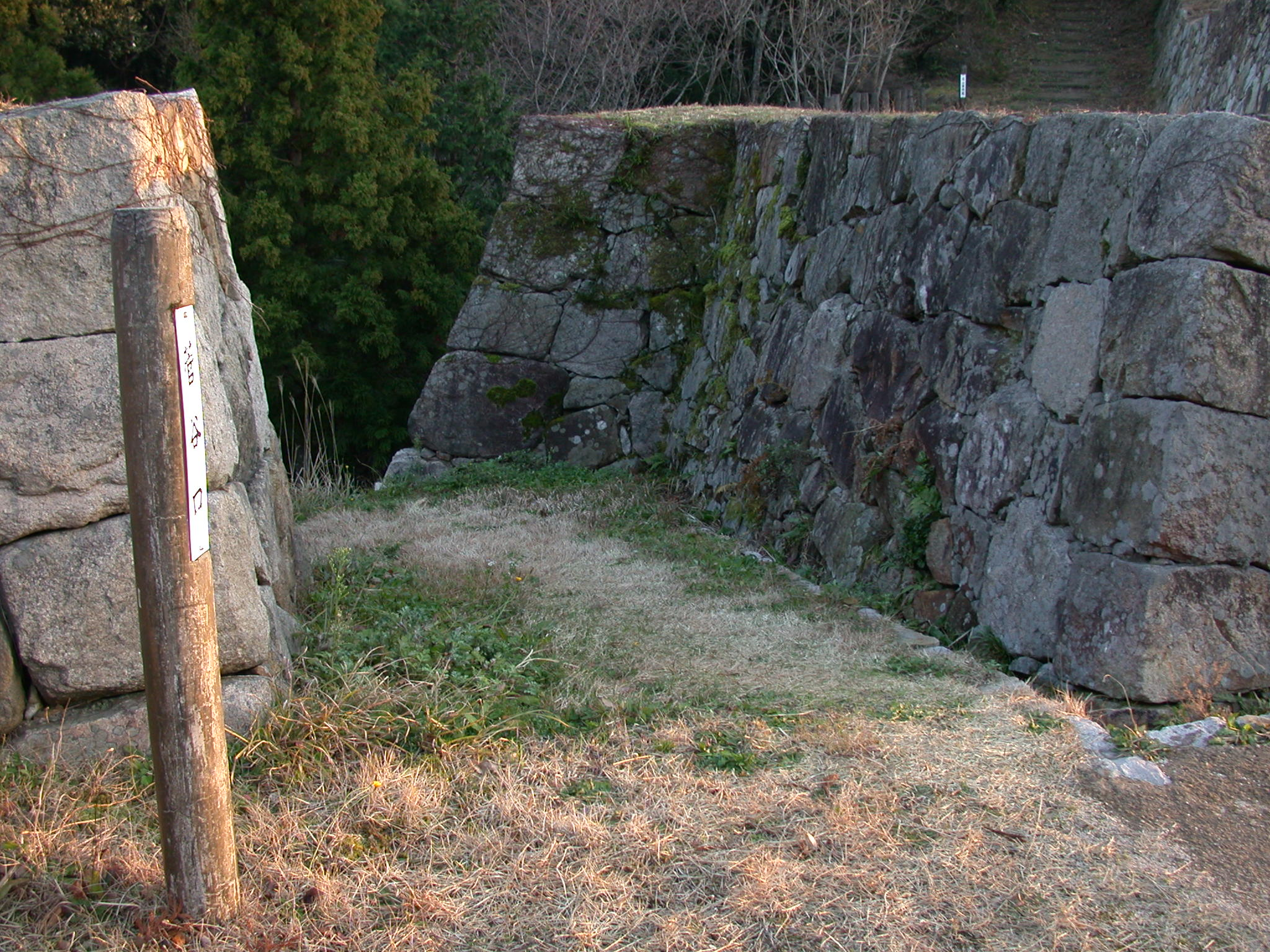
Sugatani Gate

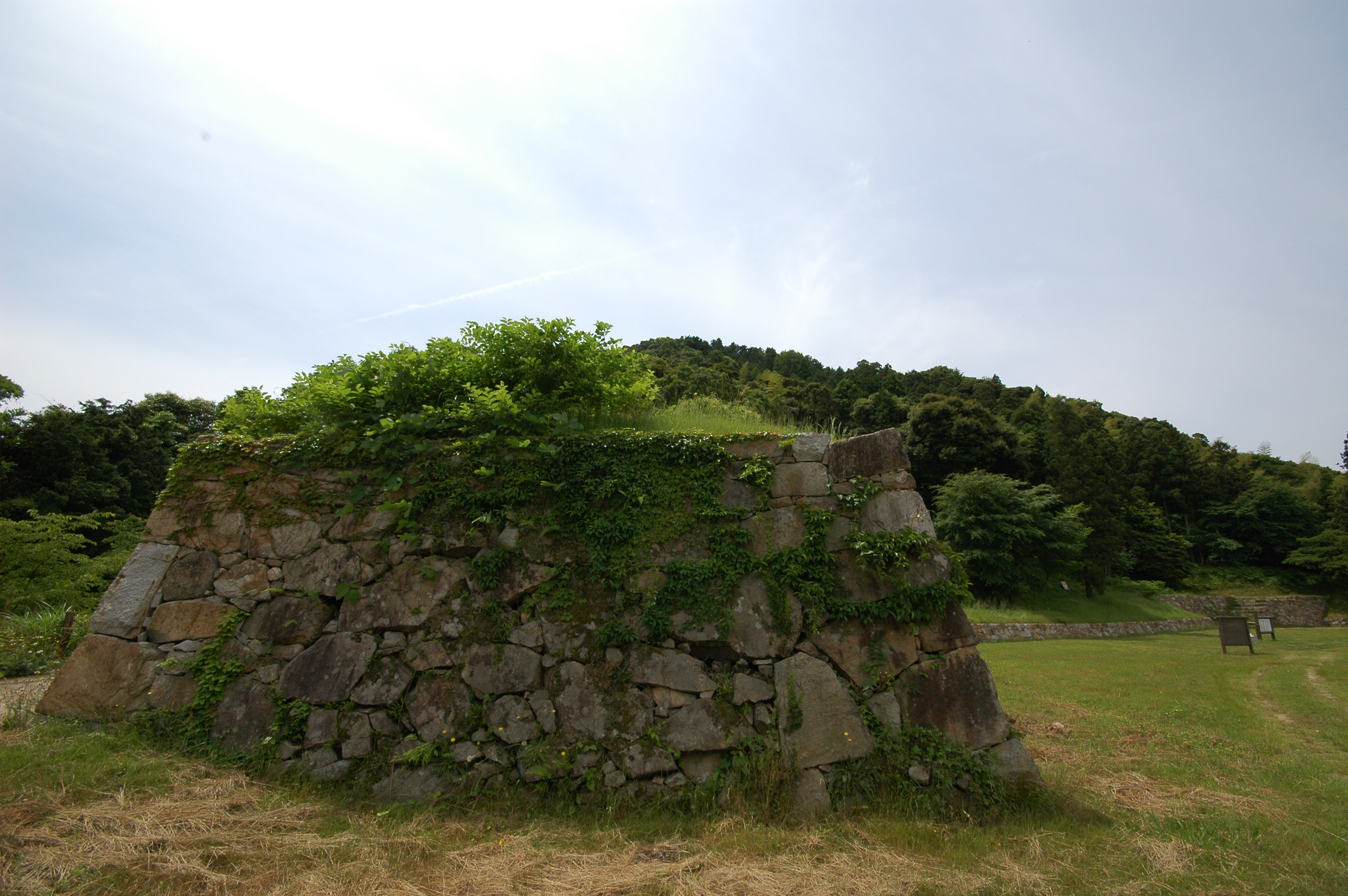
Foundations of the tenshu

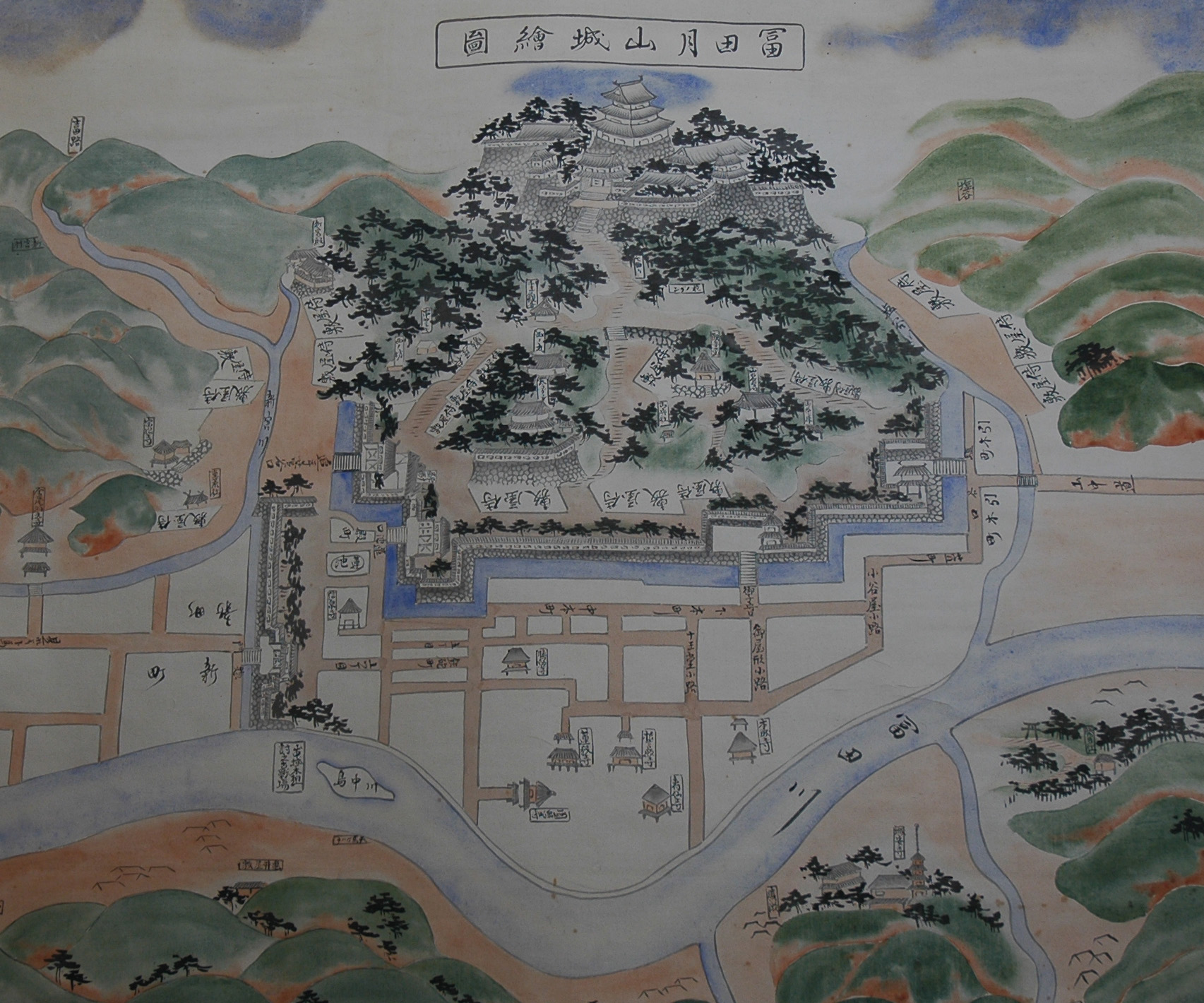
Old castle map of Gassantoda Castle

== See also ==
- List of Historic Sites of Japan (Shimane)
