= Lady Myōkyū =

Lady of the Sengoku period

Myōkyū
- Born: 1499
- Died: January 2, 1546 (aged 46–47); Yoshida-Kōriyama Castle, Aki Province
- Spouse: Mōri Motonari
- Children: One daughter Mōri Takamoto; Lady Goryū; Kikkawa Motoharu; Kobayakawa Takakage
- Parent(s): Kikkawa Kunitsune; Takahashi Naonobu's daughter
- Family: Kikkawa clan Mōri clan

Myōkyū (妙玖; 1499 – January 2, 1546) was a lady of the Sengoku period and the wife of Mōri Motonari. "Myōkyū" is her Dharma name; her real name is unknown. Her father was Kikkawa Kunitsune, her mother was Takahashi Naonobu's daughter, and her brothers were Kikkawa Mototsune and Kikkawa Tsuneyo. Her children consisted of the eldest daughter (hostage of Takahashi clan; premature death), Mōri Takamoto, Lady Goryū, Kikkawa Motoharu, and Kobayakawa Takakage.

== Life ==
Born in 1499 in Ogurayama Castle, Myōkyū was the daughter of Kikkawa Kunitsune, a lord in Aki Province.

Reaching adulthood, Myōkyū was married out of convenience to Mōri Motonari, a prominent warlord of Aki Province from the Mōri clan. With Motonari, she had a daughter (hostage of Takahashi clan; premature death caused by Takahashi following their downfall), Takamoto in 1523, Lady Goryū in 1529, Motoharu in 1530, and Takakage in 1533.

January 2, 1546, Myōkyū died in Koriyama Castle. She was 47. Her Dharma name is Myōkyūshiten Seishitsu Kyūkōtashi. Her grave's location is unknown.

== Note ==
- Although it was a political marriage, it is said that the relationship between Motonari and Myōkyū was good. For as long as Myōkyū was alive, Motonari took up no concubines.
- Though her real name is unknown, it is speculated to be Tama (玉) or Hisa (久).

== In popular culture ==
Myōkyū is portrayed in the 1997 NHK Taiga drama Mōri Motonari by Tomita Yasuko.

== See also ==
- Kikkawa clan
- Mōri clan
- Mōri Motonari
