= Amano Takashige =

Japanese samurai

- 天野 隆重
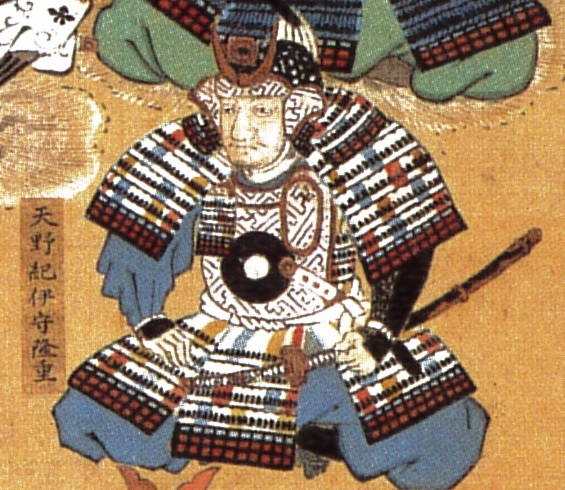
- Born: 1503; Aki Province
- Died: 17 April 1584 (aged 80–81); Iwakuni
- Military career
- Commands: Kinmeisan Castle, Saizaki Castle, Gassantoda Castle
- Conflicts: Siege of Gassantoda Castle(1569)

Amano Takashige (天野 隆重; 1503–1584) was a Japanese samurai and commander of the Sengoku period who served the Mōri clan. He was the keeper of Gassantoda castle which was the most important castle of the Mōri clan in the San'in region.

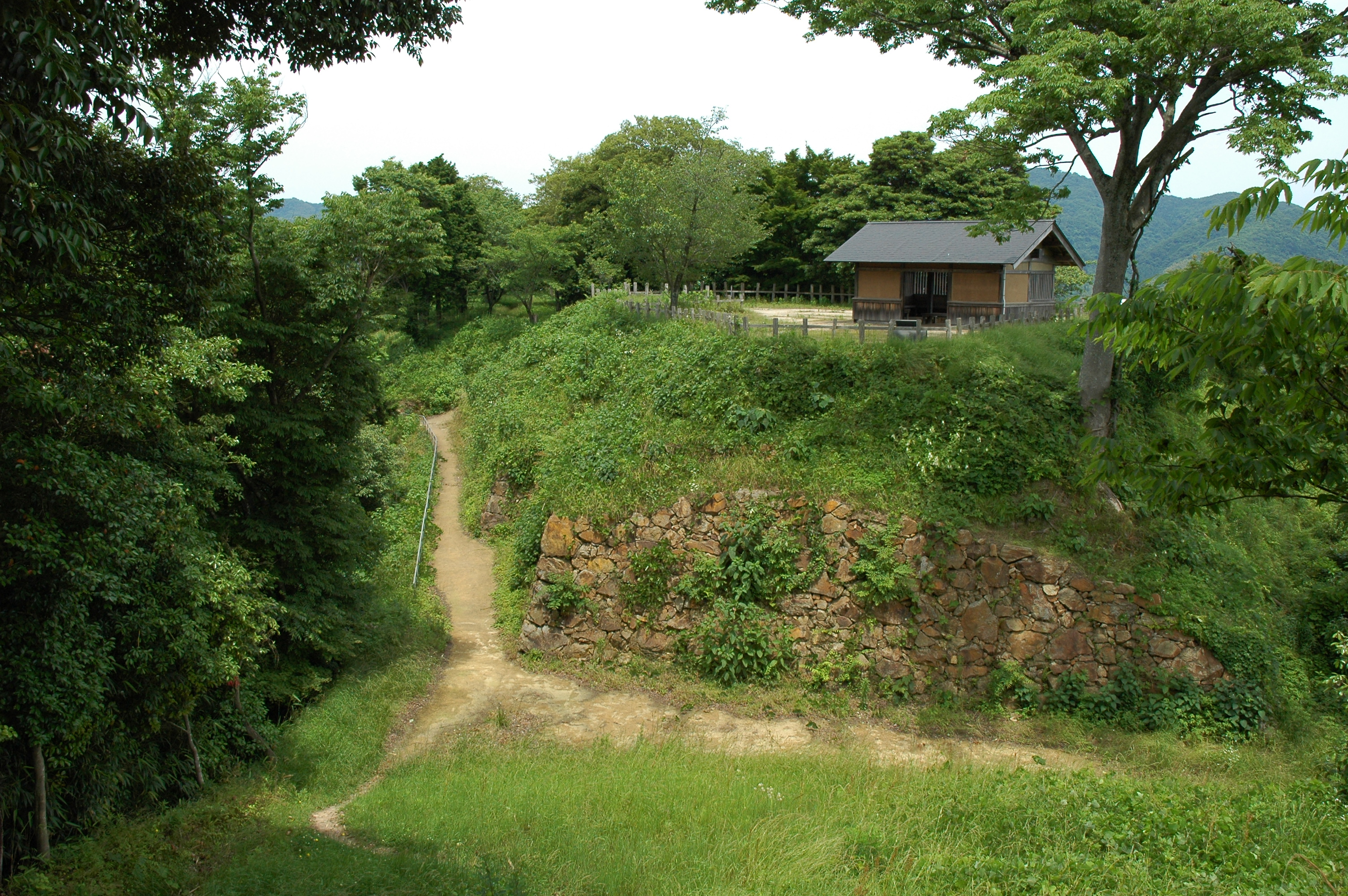
Gassantoda Castle
