= Yamanaka Yukimori =

Samurai

- 山中 幸盛
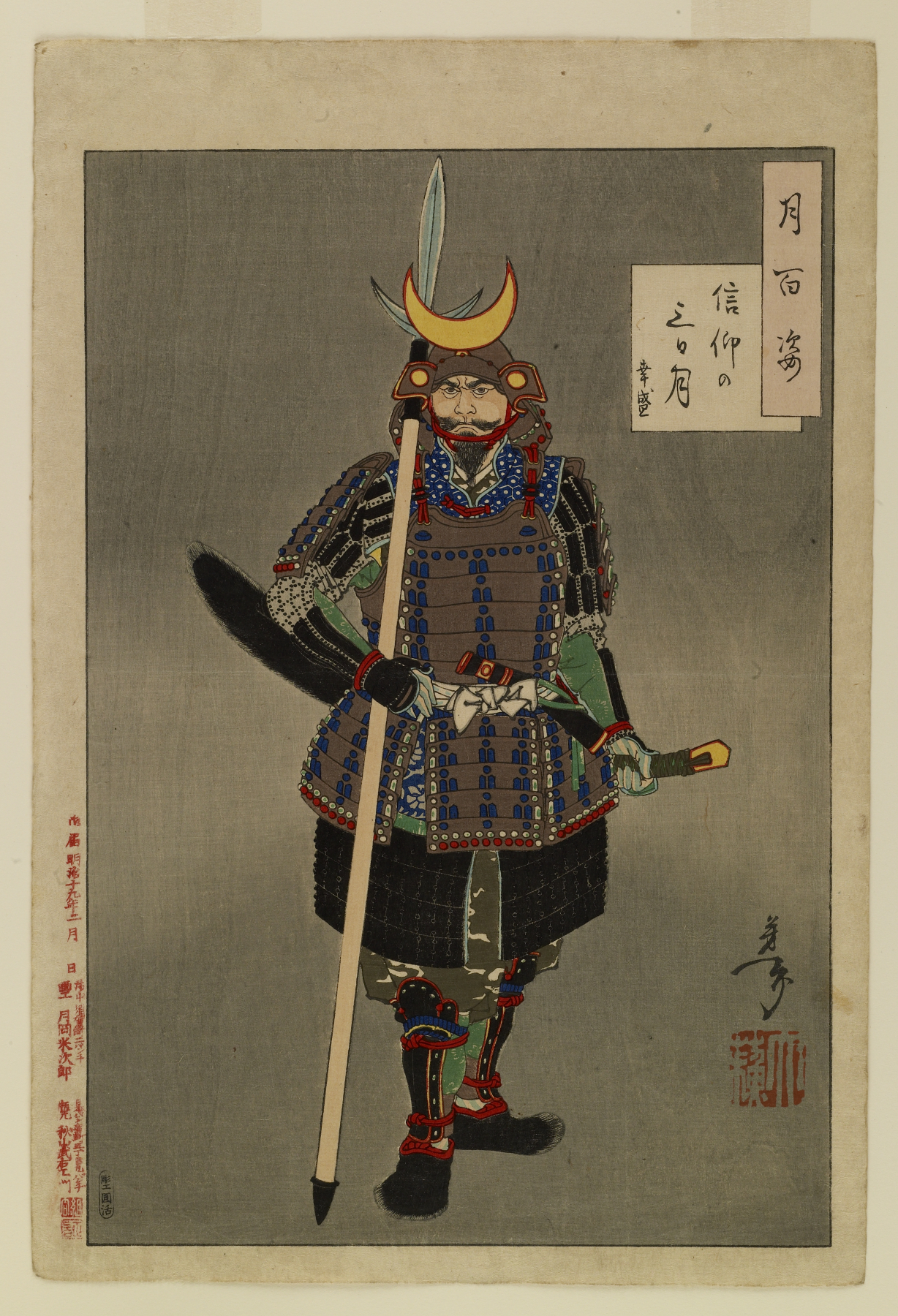
- Portrait of Yamanaka Yukimori, 1886
- Born: September 20, 1545; Shingukutani, Izumo Province (modern day Yasugi, Shimane)
- Died: August 20, 1578 (aged 32)
- Children: Yamanaka Yukimoto
- Relatives: Yamanaka Mitsuyuki (father); Nami (mother)
- Military career
- Allegiance: Amago clan
- Nicknames: Yamanaka Shikanosuke (山中 鹿の介); Shikasuke (鹿の介)
- Conflicts: Siege of Gassantoda Castle (1569); Battle of Fubeyama (1570); Siege of Kōzuki Castle (1578)

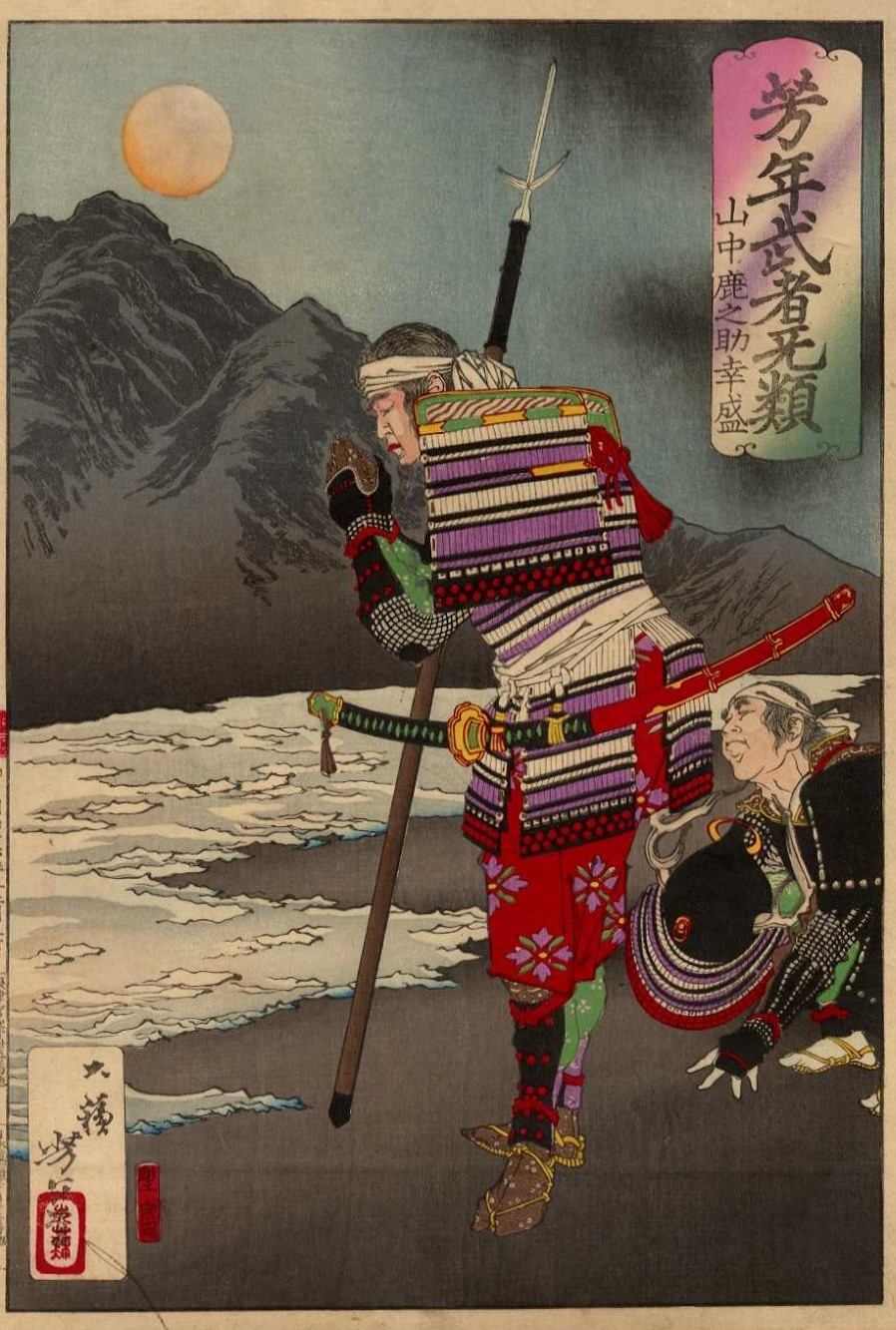
Yamanaka Shikanosuke (Yukimori) by Tsukioka Yoshitoshi. When the Amago clan was on the decline, Shikanosuke prayed to the crescent moon for the restoration of their former status, saying, 'I would rather sustain all kinds of troubles myself than see the clan of my lord fall into ruin.

Yamanaka Yukimori (山中 幸盛; September 20, 1545 – August 20, 1578), also known as Yamanaka Shikanosuke (山中 鹿の介) or Shikasuke (鹿の介), was a Japanese samurai of the Sengoku period. He served the Amago clan of Izumo Province.

In art, his portraits conventionally show a crescent moon on the front of his helmet; he was born under a harvest moon. The crescent moon ornament he wore on his helmet was a token of good luck.

== Biography ==
Yamanaka Yukimori was born in 1545. He was the son of Yamanaka Mitsuyuki and Nami. His father died at a young age and his mother was known as being very wise.

Yukimori's mother, Nami, raised Yukimori on her own. Nami grew hemp in the fields to make clothing for Yukimori while wearing a tattered dress. Meanwhile, she gave clothes, food and shelter to other poor children. These same children appreciated the kindness and, after growing up, cooperated with Yukimori. Nami told Yukimori to share his successes and failures with those who followed him and, after losing in battle, not to let his troops die or hog the praise of a victory for himself. It is said that Yukimori never forgot these lessons.

From his youth, Yukimori served the Amago clan, killing an enemy at the age of eight. From around the age of ten, he studied the art of mounted archery as well as military tactics and, at the age of thirteen, achieved the feat of taking the head of an enemy soldier.

Yukimori supported the cause of Amago Katsuhisa, against Mori clan in the Siege of Gassantoda Castle (1569), including the Battle of Fubeyama (1570).

In the Siege of Kōzuki Castle (1578), he even tried to get help from the Oda clan. Ultimately, Oda Nobunaga only used him, so the Oda army could march deeper into the Mōri clan's lands. Akechi Mitsuhide and Hashiba Hideyoshi wanted to give him reinforcements, but Nobunaga refused. Therefore, those two generals were forced into concentrating on laying siege to the Mōri and Ukita castles rather than helping Yukimori. Eventually, Yukimori surrendered and his master Katsuhisa committed suicide. Later, Kikkawa Motoharu awarded him with a small castle in Suo. When on the way to the castle, Yukimori was assassinated by the soldiers of Mōri clan.

== In popular culture ==
- Shikanosuke is one of the main playable characters in Samurai Warriors 5 (the fifth game in the Samurai Warriors franchise). In Samurai Warriors 5, Shikanosuke (voiced by Yōhei Azakami) is depicted as a loyal general to the Amago clan, well known for his impressive courage and good, attractive looks.
- Shikanosuke is a playable character in Sengoku Basara 4, where he is shown to be an accomplished martial artist and a loyal servant of Amago Haruhisa (who previously appeared as a non-playable character in Sengoku Basara 3).
- Shikanosuke is the main protagonist of the Kabuki play "Kō no Tori" (Nihongo: 神の鳥, The Birds of the Gods), in which he is portrayed as a powerful Aragoto hero and whose physical appearance is extremely similar to that of Kamakura Gongorō Kagemasa (the protagonist of Shibaraku). In this play, Shikanosuke has to save a family of Japanese storks (or Konotori) from the evil warlord Akamatsu Manyu (the main antagonist of this play). In every time this play is performed (whether in Kabuki-za (in Tokyo, Japan) or in Eirakukan (in Toyooka, Hyōgo, Japan), where this play first began to be performed), Shikanosuke is played by the popular Kabuki actor Kataoka Ainosuke VI (considered one of the main tachiyaku actors currently, known for being a renowned aragotoshi).
