= Mōri Hidemoto =

Daimyo

- 毛利 秀元
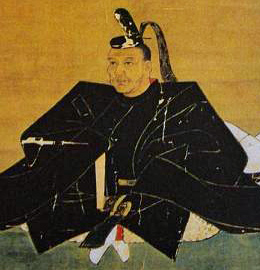
- Born: November 25, 1579; Okayama Prefecture, Japan
- Died: November 26, 1650 (aged 71)
- Spouse: Daizen-in (Toyotomi Hidenaga's daughter)
- Relatives: Mōri Motokiyo (father); Mōri Terumoto (cousin and adopted father)
- Military career
- Allegiance: Mōri clan Toyotomi clan Western Army; Tokugawa shogunate
- Unit: Mōri clan
- Conflicts: Korean Campaign (1598); Battle of Sekigahara (1600); Siege of Osaka (1614-1615); Shimabara Rebellion (1637-1638)

Mōri Hidemoto (毛利 秀元; November 25, 1579 – November 26, 1650) was a senior retainer of the Toyotomi clan throughout the latter Sengoku period of feudal Japan. Hidemoto was the eldest son of Mōri Motokiyo and initially began service under the Toyotomi as a military commander under his cousin Terumoto, the head of the Mōri clan.

== Service under Hideyoshi ==
In 1597, Hidemoto became a highly esteemed figure beneath the Mōri, and, by variable means, was chosen specifically by Toyotomi Hideyoshi to lead the Army of the Right in the Second Invasion of Korea, where he commanded 30,000 soldiers. Hidemoto was additionally backed by six generals that were assigned to his right wing: Katō Kiyomasa, who possessed 10,000; Kuroda Nagamasa, who wielded 5,000; Nabeshima Naoshige with 12,000; Ikeda Hideuji tasked with 2,800; Chōsokabe Motochika, who wielded 3,000; and Nakagawa Hidenari, who respectively possessed 2,500. With these preparations thus made, Hidemoto and his supporters led the initial Japanese offensive within the Korean province of Gyeongsang. They marched towards Jeonju after assaulting Busan, taking both Sacheon and Changpyong. Following this campaign, Hidemoto obtained a far greater power when he was made the governor of Suō and Nagato Provinces, which he held up until the decisive Sekigahara Campaign of 1600. He married daughter of Toyotomi Hidenaga later Daizen-in.

== Battle of Sekigahara ==
At the outset of this campaign, Hidemoto was determined to support the forces of Ishida Mitsunari, dubbed the "Western Forces". Since his cousin, Terumoto, possessed 128,000 soldiers that he would use to back the Western forces of Mitsunari, Hidemoto intended to assist the Western forces of Mitsunari. He gathered his armaments with great immediacy, equipped himself with 15,000 soldiers and stationed his entire army on Mt. Nangu, with his generals distributed along the eastern borders of the mountain. However, to make the circumstances go from detrimental to entirely beneficial, Kikkawa Hiroie, a general of Hidemoto, refused to move against the Eastern forces at the start of the battle. As Hiroie was the leading general of the army, Hidemoto was prevented from reaching the frontlines, placing him with little other choice than to resentfully retreat without offering his support to the Mitsunari.

Later, as a general resolution to such an event, Hidemoto's original fief was dropped from 200,000 to a modest 50,000 out of sympathetic consideration to Terumoto's service, causing Hidemoto a proper level of humiliation.

== Service under Ieyasu ==
Hidemoto has been believed a surpassing leader unlike his below-average father-in-law, Mōri Terumoto. He used to be one of the most Jacobinical objectors to Ieyasu, but he turned to a supporter of Ieyasu after Battle of Sekigahara.

Hidemoto apparently remained as first commander under Ieyasu throughout the Edo period. He more than likely assisted in the Sieges of Osaka and the later Shimabara Rebellion before he eventually died in 1650.

| Preceded by New creation | Daimyō of Chōfu; 1600–1650 | Succeeded by Mōri Mitsuhiro |
