= Mōri Takamoto =

Japanese daimyō

- 毛利 隆元
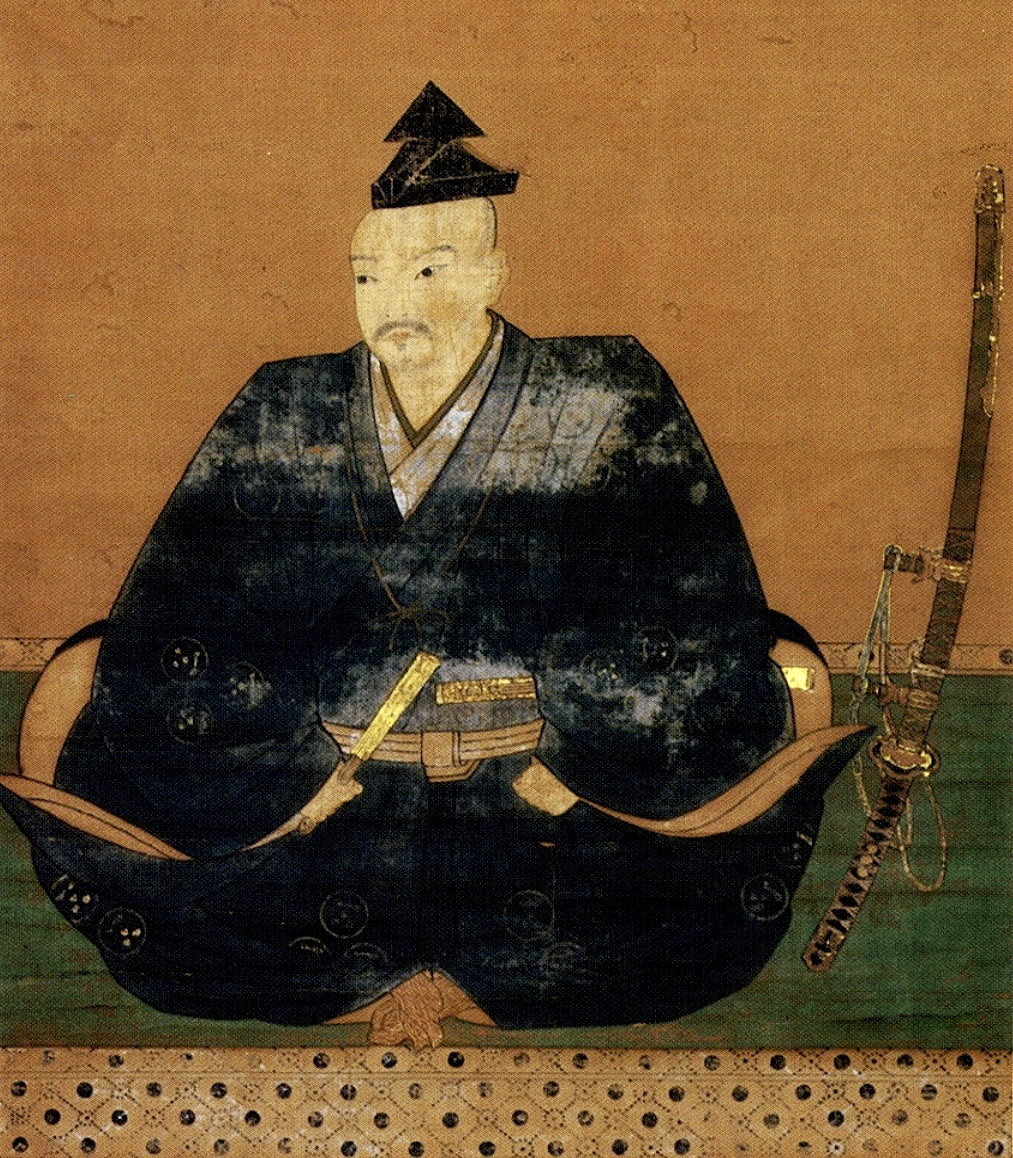

Head of Mōri clan
- In office 1557–1563
- Preceded by: Mōri Motonari
- Succeeded by: Mōri Terumoto

Personal details
- Born: 1523 Sarukake castle, Aki Province
- Died: September 18, 1563 (aged 40 or 41) Yoshida, Aki Province
- Children: Mōri Terumoto
- Parents: Mōri Motonari (father); Lady Myōkyū (mother)
- Nickname: Shōnotarō (少輔太郎)

Military service
- Allegiance: Imperial House of Japan; Amago clan Ōuchi clan Mōri clan
- Rank: Daimyō (Lord)
- Unit: Mōri clan
- Battles/wars: Battle of Miyajima (1555); Siege of Moji (1561)

Mōri Takamoto (毛利 隆元; 1523 – September 18, 1563) was a daimyō (feudal lord) of Aki Province during Japan's Sengoku period. He was the eldest legitimate son of Mōri Motonari.

== Biography ==
Mōri Takamoto was born in the Tajihi-Sarugake Castle in 1523. Takamoto was sent to Suō Province as a hostage of Ōuchi Yoshitaka. This was done to ensure his father's loyalties to Ōuchi. He was allowed to return home and around 1546, upon his father's retirement, Takamoto inherited formal leadership of the family, but his father Motonari continued to wield actual control over the clan's affairs.

In 1555, Sue Harukata, one of Ōuchi's vassals, staged a coup and forced Ōuchi Yoshitaka to commit suicide. He was then attacked by Mōri Takamoto and his father, and was defeated in the battle of Miyajima. The Mōri, defeating the Sue/Ōuchi forces, thus rose to power in the Chūgoku region,

In 1561, Takamoto fought in the Siege of Moji against Ōtomo Sōrin in alliance with the Portuguese. Ōtomo led an all-out attack on the castle, but the assault failed, and the castle finally remained in Mōri possession.

At the advice or orders of his father, Takamoto seized the opportunity to attack the Ōuchi territory. He was leading the Mōri armies through Bingo Province, when on September 18, 1563, but he suddenly died at the age of 41. Takamoto died of a sudden disease, though assassination by poison was suspected.

Around 1566, Takamoto's son Mōri Terumoto was selected as his heir, but Motonari continued to wield the true power of Mori clan.

== Family ==
- Father: Mōri Motonari (1497–1571)
- Mother: Myōkyū (1499–1546)
- Siblings:
  - An unnamed sister
  - Lady Goryū, wife of Shishido Takaie (d. 1574)
  - Kikkawa Motoharu (1530–1586)
  - Kobayakawa Takakage (1533–1597)
- Half Siblings:
  - Ninomiya Naritoki (1546–1607)
  - Mōri Motokiyo (1551–1597)
  - Mōri Motoaki (1552–1585)
  - Izuha Mototomo (1555–1571)
  - Amano Motomasa (1559–1609)
  - Suetsugu Motoyasu (1560–1601)
  - Kobayakawa Hidekane (1567–1601)
- Wife: Lady Ozaki, daughter of Naitō Okimori and adopted daughter of Ōuchi Yoshitaka (1527–1572)
- Children:
  - Mōri Terumoto (1553–1625)
  - Lady Tsuwano, first wife of Yoshimi Hiroyori
