= Shishido Takaie =

- 宍戸隆家
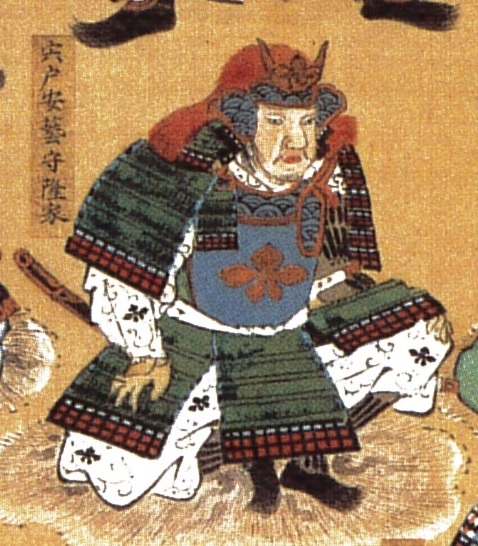
- Shishido Takaie
- Born: 1518; Aki Province
- Died: 5 February 1592 (aged 73–74); Aki Province
- Relatives: Father: Shishido Motoie (宍戸元家); Mother: Yamanouchi Naomichi's daughter (山内直通の娘); Spouse: Lady Goryū
- Military career
- Allegiance: Mōri clan
- Rank: Head of Shishido clan
- Unit: Shishido clan
- Conflicts: Battle of Miyajima (1555)

Shishido Takaie (宍戸隆家; 1518 – 5 February 1592) was the head of the Shishido clan of Aki Province during Japan's Sengoku period. He was a commander of Goryu castle. He married the daughter of Mōri Motonari.
