= Mōri Motokiyo =

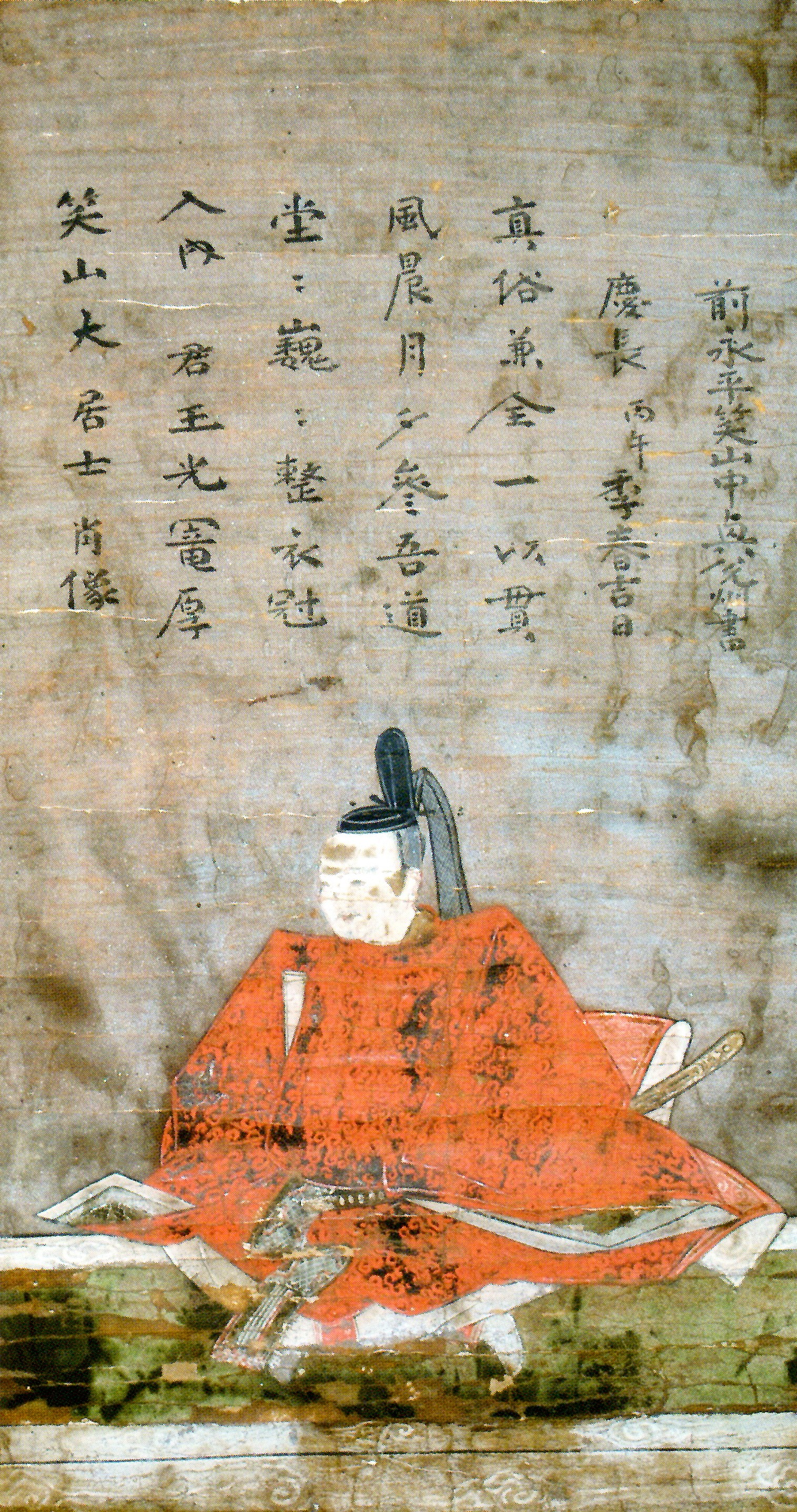
Hoida Motokiyo

Mōri Motokiyo (毛利元清; 1551 – August 21, 1597), also known as Hoida Motokiyo (穂井田元清) was the fourth son to the reputed Mōri Motonari throughout the latter Sengoku Period of Feudal Japan. He has the same biological mother with Amano Motomasa and Kobayakawa Hidekane.

== Family ==
- Father: Mōri Motonari (1497–1571)
- Mother: Nomi no Ōkata (?-1601)
- Brothers:
  - Mōri Takamoto (1523–1563)
  - Kikkawa Motoharu (1530–1586)
  - Kobayakawa Takakage (1533–1597)
  - Kobayakawa Hidekane (1567–1601)
- Son: Mōri Hidemoto (1579–1650)
