= Mōri Hidenari =

- 毛利 秀就
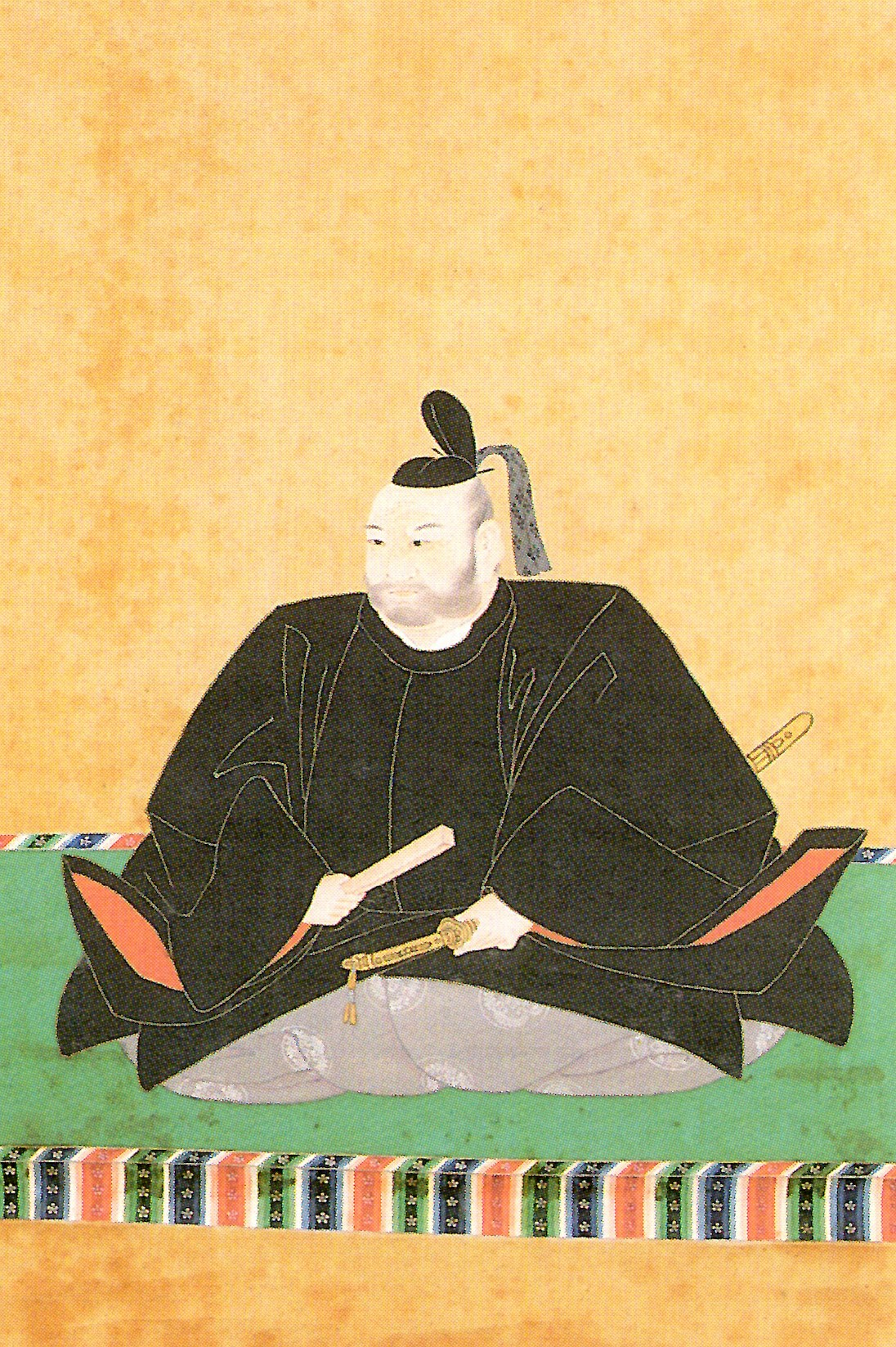

Head of Mōri clan
- In office 1623–1651
- Preceded by: Mōri Terumoto
- Succeeded by: Mōri Tsunahiro

Personal details
- Born: November 19, 1595
- Died: February 24, 1651 (aged 55)
- Relations: Father: Mōri Terumoto; Mother: Seitai-in (清泰院); Tokugawa Hidetada (father in law)
- Nickname: Shōjumaru (松寿丸)

Military service
- Allegiance: Mōri clan Tokugawa Shogunate
- Rank: Daimyō (Lord)
- Unit: Mōri clan
- Commands: Chōshū Domain
- Battles/wars: Siege of Osaka (1614-1615)

Mōri Hidenari (毛利 秀就; November 19, 1595 – February 24, 1651) was a Japanese daimyō of the early Edo period, who ruled the Chōshū Domain. He was head of Mori clan and son of Mori Terumoto.

== Family ==
- Father: Mōri Terumoto (1553–1625)
- Wife: Kisahime (1598–1655) daughter of Yūki Hideyasu and adopted daughter of Tokugawa Hidetada
- Heir: Mōri Tsunahiro

Preceded by Mōri Terumoto	2nd (Mōri) lord of Chōshū; 1623–1651	Succeeded by Mōri Tsunahiro
