= Hayashi Narinaga =

Japanese samurai

- 林 就長
- Born: 1517; Doi, Kawajiri, Bingo
- Died: July 19, 1605 (aged 87 or 88); Aka Castle, Bingo
- Relatives: Father: Kikuchi Takenaga (菊池武長); Mother: unknown
- Military career
- Allegiance: Yukimatsu clan (行松氏); Yamana clan Mōri clan Mōri Motonari; Toyotomi clan Toyotomi Hideyoshi; Tokugawa clan Tokugawa Ieyasu
- Rank: Naifū (内府); Honsa (本佐); Yōtsugi (与次); Ukyō (右京); Moku-no-jō (木工允); Lord of Matsuoka Castle (松岡城主); Lord of Mukaiyama Castle (向山城主); Lord of Aka Castle (赤城主); Karō (家老 house elder); Yamashiro-no-kami (山城守); Tosa-no-kami (土佐守); Hizen-no-kami (肥前守); Toyotomi-no-asomi (豊臣朝臣); Ju go-i-no-ge (従五位下); Ginzan-Bugyō (銀山奉行); Bugyō
- Nicknames: Hayashi Saburōzaemon Shigesato (林三郎左衛門重眞); Hayashi Moku-no-jō (林木工允); Hayashi Tosa-no-kami (林土佐守); Hayashi Hizen-no-kami (林肥前守); Toyotomi no asomi Narinaga (豊臣朝臣就長); Dōhan (道範)
- Conflicts: Siege of Toda Castle; Siege of Kozuki Castle; Kyūshū Campaign; Japanese invasions of Korea; Siege of Tachibana (1569); Battle of Nunobeyama (1570); ...many others

Hayashi Narinaga (林 就長; 1517 – July 19, 1605) was a samurai during the Sengoku period, retainer of the Mōri clan and was a ji-samurai (koku-jin-ryōshū) of southern Bingo Province. He held many positions including karō (clan elder) serving Mōri Motonari and his father Mōri Hiromoto in diplomatic missions with Toyotomi Hideyoshi. Narinaga was a bugyō under Mōri Terumoto. From Hideyoshi he received the rank of Hizen-no-kami (肥前守). He served as diplomat between the Mōri and Hideyoshi. Later he was bestowed the 5th court rank, junior grade Ju go-i-no-ge (従五位). The character "nari, 就" came from his lord Mōri Motonari and "naga, 長" from his father Kikuchi Takenaga. Narinaga was one of the few to live through all the Sengoku period. (Note: Kurahashi, Sumio (March 1, 2000). Hurusato (Old Country) Tokushu Sengoku Jidai Sera-gun de Katsuyaku shita Shitobito (People of Sera-gun in the Sengoku Era) (in Japanese) (Report Hurusato #3 ed.). 722-0411, Sera-gun, Kosan-cho, Utsu-do 2296-2 Kurahashi Sumio's House.: Kosan-cho Culture Association.)

== Early life and background ==
Hayashi Narinaga was born 1517 in Doi (土), Kawajiri (川尻), Bingo Province, today part of Mihara City, Hiroshima Prefecture. Narinaga's childhood name is unknown. His birth year is only known from his recorded age at death which was 89 years. In Japan an infant is one year old at birth so in Western years he was 88 years old. His father was Kikuchi Takenaga (菊池武長) and his mother is unknown but there is a tradition that she was a daughter of the Hayashi clan of Kawajiri. His father Takenaga was a descendant of the powerful Kikuchi clan that ruled Higo Province since the 11th century. The Kikuchi clan is believed to be descended from the kings of Baekje, one of the Three Kingdoms of Korea.

His father, Takenaga, came from a branch of the Kikuchi clan that were koku-jin-ryōshū (ji-samurai) in Hōki Province. The relationship with the Kikuchi clan of Higo Province is unclear but in the Hayashi clan genealogy Takenaga is the son of Kikuchi Takekuni (菊池武国) of Higo but this is impossible because of the years of birth. Scholars now believe he must have been a grandson of Takekuni. The Kikuchi clan in Higo were overthrown by the Ōtomo clan, another powerful family of Kyūshū.

The Kikuchi clan of Hōki Province were based at Odaka-jō (尾高城) and were retainers of the Yukimatsu clan of Izumo Province. The Yukimatsu were vassals of the Yamana clan. One famous figure from the Kikuchi clan of Hōki Province was Kikuchi Otohachi (菊池音八) who is remembered as a "moshō" (a strong bushō) who was killed by Yamanaka Yukimori. In 1560 the Amago clan launched a campaign against the Yamana clan and took control of their land so Narinaga along with his father joined the rebellion to secede from their grasp.

== Retainer of the Mōri ==
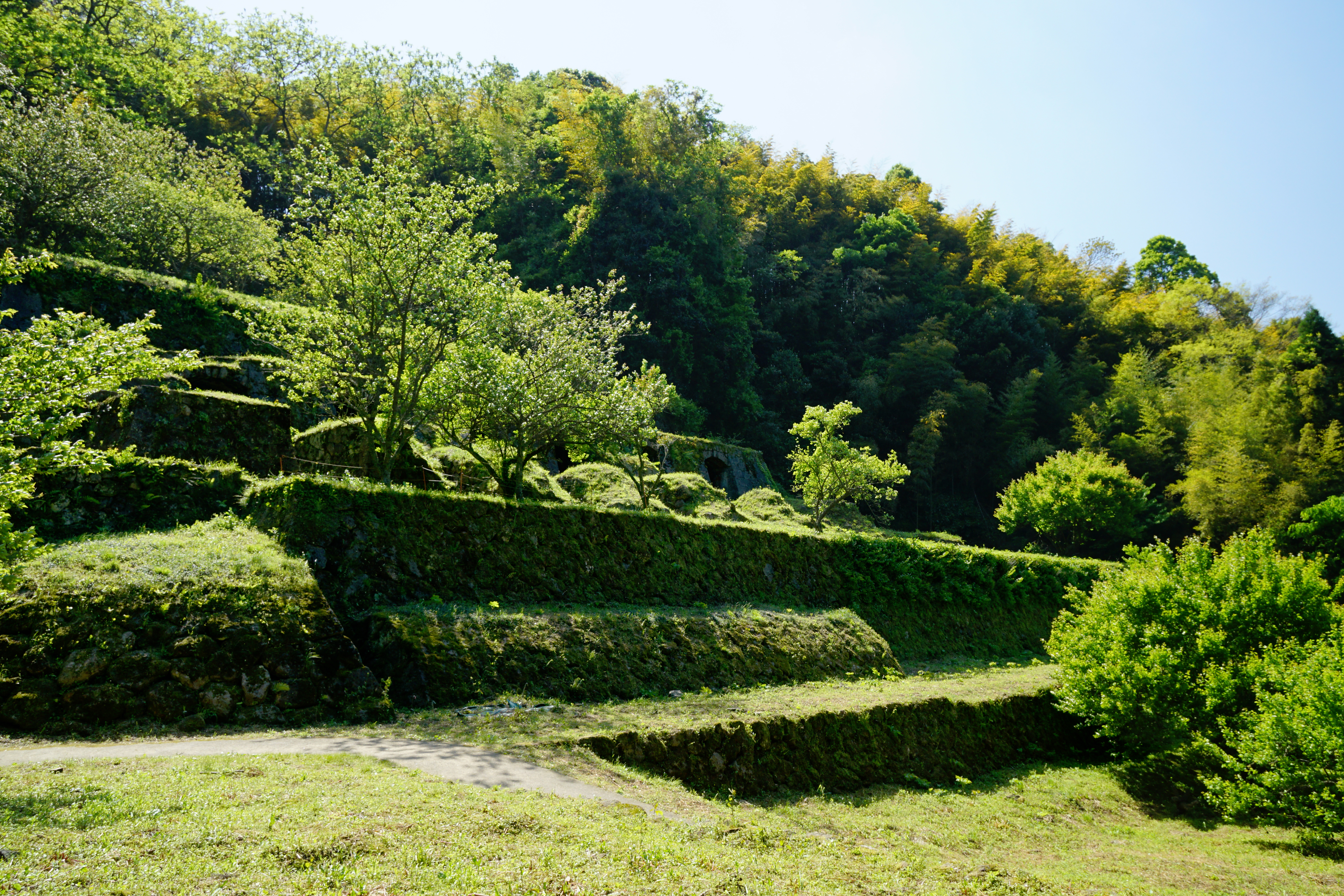
Iwami Ginzan Silver Mine (2018).

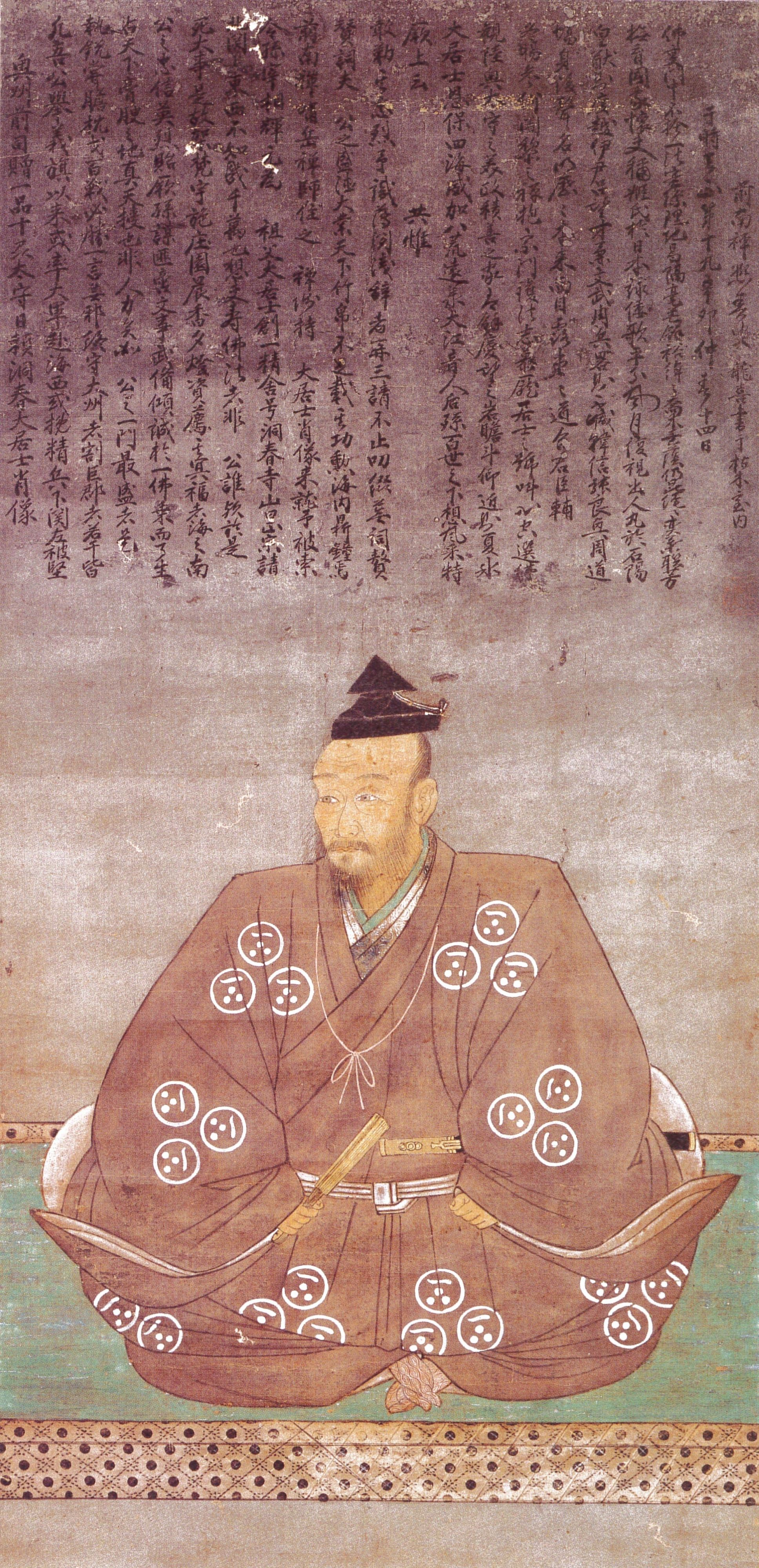
Narinaga's lord, Mōri Motonari.

In 1562 Odaka-jō fell to Sugihara Morishige (杉原盛重), a general of the Mōri clan. The Kikuchi clan of Hōki Province were vassals of the Yukimatsu clan so after their downfall they left to Bingo Province to become retainers of the Mōri clan under Mōri Motonari. At this time it seems that his father, Takenaga, was adopted into the Hayashi clan of Kawajiri and became known as Hayashi Moku-no-jō Michiaki (林木工允道明). The title Moku-no-jō (secretary of the Bureau of Carpentry) is passed down in the Hayashi clan for a few generations. There is a family tradition that Takenaga married the daughter of the Hayashi clan but there are no records to justify this. There is a record from a tombstone that Hayashi Yajirō (林弥二郎) of Kawajiri died in 1552 and may be the father of his wife. The Hayashi clan of Kawajiri were powerful in the area.

Narinaga may have been known at this time as Hayashi Saburōzaemon Shigesato (林三郎左衛門重眞). A man with this name was lord of Matsuoka Castle (松岡城) and it is known that later Narinaga was lord of this castle. He became a vassal of Mōri Motonari and was given the position of karō and also as the ginzan-bugyō (mining official) of Iwami Ginzan Silver Mine, a position he held until ca.1585. Other officials at the mine whom Narinaga would have known were Hirasa Nariyuki (平佐就之) and Ōhashi Hachizō (大橋八蔵).'

After the death of his father in 1576 he inherited his title and became known as Hayashi Moku-no-jō (林木工允).

=== Siege of Toda Castle ===
In July 1562 at the First Siege of Toda Castle, Mōri Motonari ordered Hayashi Narinaga to go as a messenger to Honjō Etchū-no-kami Tsunemitsu (本城常光). Honjō Tsunemitsu held Yamabuki Castle (山吹城) in Iwami Province and was originally a vassal of the Amago clan, but defected to Mōri Motonari in 1563. Yamabuki Castle was strategically important for control of the Iwami Ginzan Silver Mine.
Two years later in April, 1564, Narinaga attended the Second Siege of Toda Castle.

=== Siege of Kōzuki Castle (1578) ===
The Siege of Kōzuki Castle occurred in 1578, when the army of Mōri Terumoto attacked and captured Kōzuki Castle (上月城) in Harima Province. Terumoto ordered his uncle, Kobayakawa Takakage, to bring reinforcements and he showed up with a force 30,000 strong. Narinaga and his first son, Motoyoshi, who was 21 years old at the time were present at the battle and helped bring down the castle. At Hiroshima Museum there is a letter of thanks from Mōri Terumoto to Narinaga for his son's participation in the battle. Kōzuki Castle had been taken by Hashiba Hideyoshi the previous year and entrusted to Amago Katsuhisa. When it fell to Mōri Motonari, Katsuhisa committed suicide (seppuku) and his loyal and heroic general Yamanaka Yukimori was captured and killed in the battle. Yukimori was the samurai who had killed Narinaga's family member, Kikuchi Otohachi, many years before.

== Diplomat between Mori and Hideyoshi (1582) ==
In 1582 with the death of Oda Nobunaga at the Incident at Honnō-ji, Toyotomi Hideyoshi became the most powerful man in Japan. Hideyoshi rewarded Narinaga for his allegiance and merit in battle by making him lord of Mukaiyama Castle (Mukaiyama-jō, 向山城) in Gocho-gun, Bingo Province (today Mitsugi District, Hiroshima) and Matsuoka Castle (Matsuoka-jō, 松岡城) in Kōzan-cho, Sera-gun, Bingo Province. Matsuoka Castle originally belonged to the Matsuoka clan.

In December, 1583 Narinaga was ordered by Hideyoshi to work on communications with the Mōri clan of the Chūgoku region. In 1584 Narinaga donated a statue depicting a seated Mōri Motonari to Chōan Temple (Chōan-ji) at Iwami Ginzan Silver Mine. The statue was moved to its current location at the Mōri family home in Bofu, Yamaguchi Prefecture.

== Hideyoshi's Kyūshū Campaign (1586–1587) ==
In 1586 Toyotomi Hideyoshi sent a letter of thanks to his army in Chikuzen Province during the Kyūshū Campaign. It was addressed to several daimyō and generals who had succeeded in a great victory attacking a castle. One of the people he addressed was Hayashi Tosa-no-kami Narinaga (林土佐守就長) meaning at this time he held the title "Tosa-no-kami" (an honorary court office) but it is unknown when he had received it. In 1587 he was part of Mōri Terumoto's Mapping Committee (毛利輝元 惣国検地) which he worked with until 1591.

In 1588 it is recorded that Hayashi Tosa-no-kami is promoted to the position where he receives direct orders from Hideyoshi on strategies in Kyūshū. The reason Hideyoshi chose Narinaga for this was because he held extensive knowledge of Kyūshū where his ancestors from the Kikuchi clan had ruled. This year Hideyoshi bestowed the Toyotomi uji (豊臣朝臣, Toyotomi-no-asomi, courtier of Toyotomi) upon his closest followers including Narinaga. In July, 1588 of the same year Narinaga is given the new title of "Hizen-no-kami" (肥前守) in accordance with the Junior Fifth Rank, Junior Grade (Ju go-i-no-ge, 従五位下). The same month, Emperor Go-Yōzei visited Toyotomi Hideyoshi's mansion and the Sword hunt Edict was declared. Three years later in 1591 Mōri Terumoto began the construction of Hiroshima Castle.

== Hideyoshi's Korean Campaign (1592–1594) ==
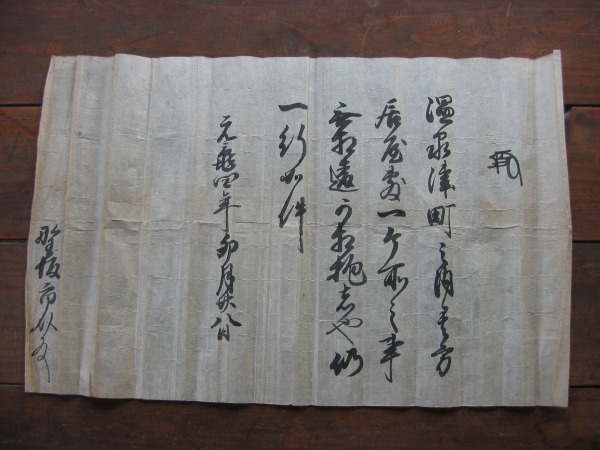
Letter from Toyotomi Hideyoshi about Narinaga.

In April and December 1592 Narinaga was sent as a diplomatic envoy between Toyotomi Hideyoshi and the Mōri clan along with Ankokuji Ekei (安國寺惠瓊). One of the reasons they were sent was to deliver a letter of thanks from Hideyoshi to Mōri Terumoto for the hospitality he had received when he was visiting Hiroshima Castle

Also this year, Hideyoshi ordered the Invasion of Korea. Narinaga was already 75 years old when he was sent to war across the Sea of Japan. There is a letter held at the Hiroshima Museum addressed to Mōri Terumoto from Toyotomi Hideyoshi and in it he expresses worry for his "old friend" Hayashi Hizen-no-kami who was old and at war.

== Retirement and death (1594–1605) ==
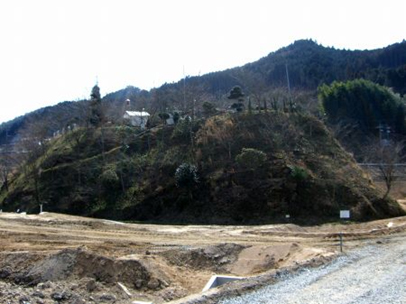
Remains of Aka Castle (2011).

In 1594 Hayashi Hizen-no-kami returned from Toyotomi Hideyoshi's invasion of Korea after fighting for two years. He was 78 years old and requested retirement to Mōri Terumoto who accepted so Narinaga gave his son Motoyoshi Matsuoka Castle and built Aka Castle (Aka-jō, 赤城) as a retirement castle. It may have been red because the name literally means "red castle". His son, Motoyoshi, received an annual stipend of 2,290 koku which was twice as much as the Hayashi clan had before they left to the Chōshū Domain. Narinaga took the life of a Buddhist monk and took the name Dōhan (道範). Today there are only ruins of Aka Castle with only the walls and moat remaining. It is measured that it was 480 meters by 57 meters in size and is considered a "yama-shirō" (mountain castle) or "residence hall".

In September, 1597 Narinaga who was residing at Aka Castle rebuilt Hijiri Shrine (Hijiri-jinja, 聖神社) which had burned down. The shrine was near his retirement castle and Matsuoka Castle where his son lived. In front of the shrine which still stands today there are town stone dogs and one is believed to be donated by Narinaga. The next year, Toyotomi Hideyoshi died at Fushimi Castle (伏見城) at the age of 63.

After the Battle of Sekigahara in 1600 both Matsuoka Castle and Aka Castle no longer belonged to the Hayashi clan who were transferred to Hiroshima Castle and Mihara Castle.
Narinaga died on July 19, 1605, at the age of 89 (88 in Western counting) outliving most of his contemporaries of the Sengoku period. Where he is buried is unknown. The temple sacred to Narinaga today is Mannen-ji (萬年寺) in Kue, Aki Province (today Hiroshima Prefecture).

== Family ==
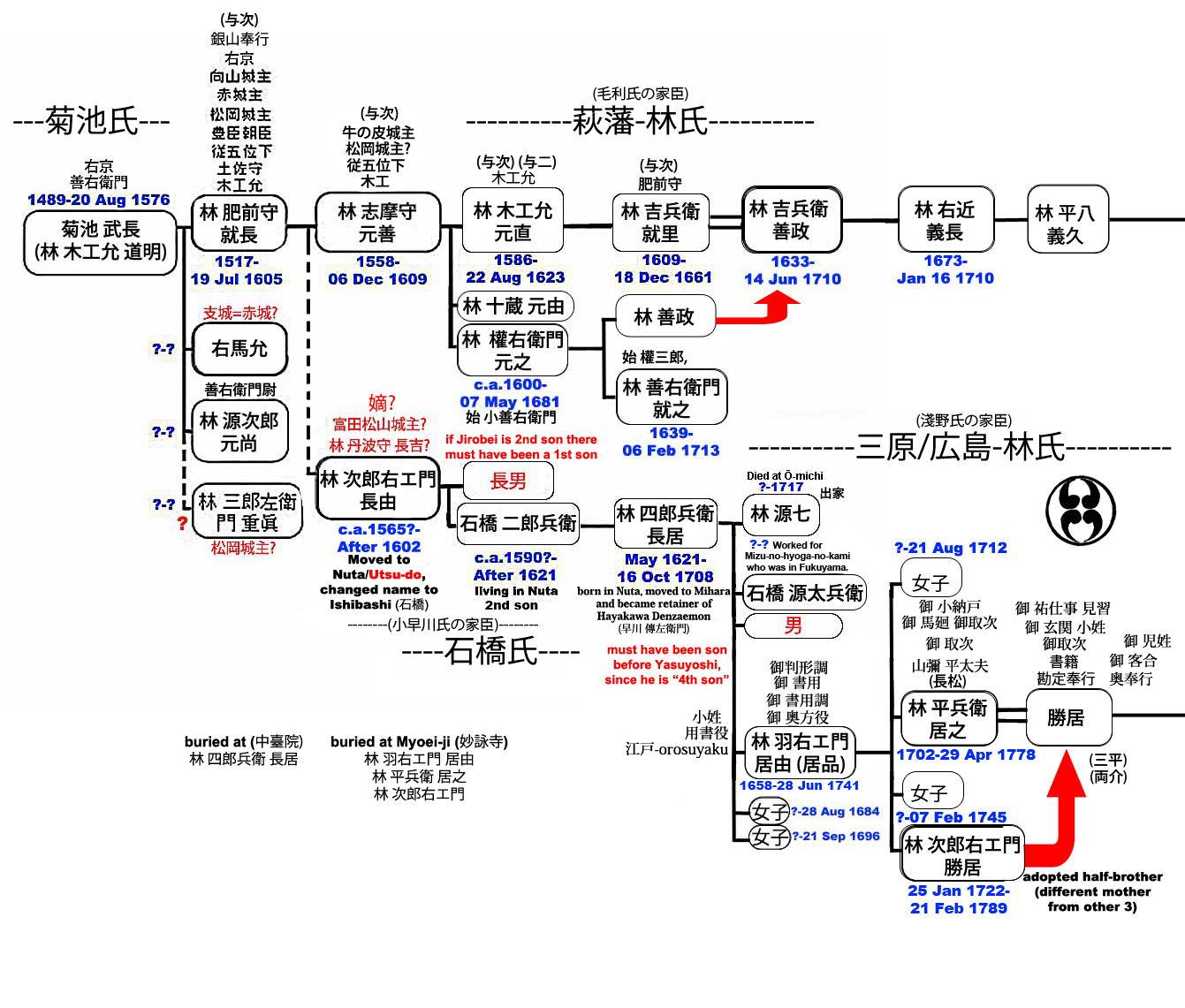
Family tree made by Victor Larsson, descendant of Narinaga.

- Father: Kikuchi Takenaga (菊池武長, 1489–1576)
- Uncle?: Kikuchi Otohachi (菊池音八)
- Mother: unknown, possibly a daughter of the Hayashi clan of Kawajiri (川尻林氏).
  - Brother: Hayashi Genjirō Motonao (林源次郎元尚), Zenuemon (善右衛門尉).
  - Brother: Hayashi Umanosuke (林右馬允), lived at Aka Castle.
    - Wife(s): unknown
      - Son: Hayashi Shima-no-kami Motoyoshi (林志摩守元善, 1558–1609), retainer of Mōri Terumoto, moved to the Chōshū Domain when Terumoto was transferred by Tokugawa Ieyasu. Lord of Matsuoka Castle (松岡城) which he received from his father.
      - Son: Hayashi Tamba-no-kami Nagayoshi (林丹波守長吉, ? –1636), retainer of Kobayakawa Takakage, Kobayakawa Hideaki and Kobayakawa Hidekane. He moved to Nuta (沼田) and changed his surname to Ishibashi (石橋) after the Battle of Sekigahara and the end of the Kobayakawa clan. Also known as Hayashi Jirōuemon Nagayoshi (林次郎右エ門長由) or (林次郎兵衛長早). Lord of Tomita-Matsuyama Castle (Tomita-Matsuyama-jō, 富田松山城).
      - Daughter: name unknown (入江元親室, ? – ? ), wife of Irie Motochika.

== Popular culture ==
- Named in the 1997 NHK Taiga drama TV series Mōri Motonari.

== See also ==
- Kikuchi clan
- Mōri clan
- Mōri Motonari
- Amago clan
- Mihara Domain
- Kobayakawa Takakage
- Aki Province
- Bingo Province
- Hayashi clan
- Ankokuji Ekei
