= Lady Toida =

Japanese aristocrat (?-1619)

Lady Toida 問田大方
- Died: June 21, 1619
- Spouse: Kobayakawa Takakage
- Children: Kobayakawa Hidekane (adopted son); Kobayakawa Hideaki (adopted son)
- Parent: Kobayakawa Masahira
- Relatives: Kobayakawa Shigehira (brother)
- Family: Kobayakawa clan

Lady Toida (問田大方, Toida no Ōkata; died June 21, 1619) was a Japanese noblewoman of the Sengoku and early Edo period. She was the legal wife of Kobayakawa Takakage, third son of daimyō Mōri Motonari.

== Life ==
Lady Toida was born as the daughter of Kobayakawa Masahira – the head of the Numata-Kobayakawa clan, which was the head family of the Kobayakawa clan – but because Masahira died at the young age of 21, her older brother, Shigehira, succeeded the Numata-Kobayakawa clan seat, but Shigehira became blind at a young age. In 1550, he was detained by Ōuchi Yoshitaka and Mōri Motonari under the suspicion of liaison with the Amago clan, and he was forced to retire and enter the priesthood.

In 1551, Lady Toida was married to the third son of Motonari, Takakage, who was adopted into and succeeding the Takehara-Kobayakawa clan. This way, the two clans were reunited. Although there were no children between the two, Takakage did not take a concubine, as their relationship was harmonious. However, the Kobayakawa bloodline ceased. For that reason, they adopted Motonari's youngest son, Mototsuna (later named Hidekane), to succeed to the family name.

Her posthumous Buddhist name is Jikōin Gekkei Eichi (慈光院月渓永智). Her tomb is in Yamaguchi at Taiunji Temple.

== In popular culture ==
Lady Toida is portrayed in the 1997 NHK Taiga drama Mōri Motonari as "Lady Ako". She is portrayed by Fujiyoshi Kumiko, with her younger incarnation portrayed by Mifune Mika.
