= Mihara Castle =

Castle in Mihara, Japan

- 三原城
- Mihara, Hiroshima, Japan
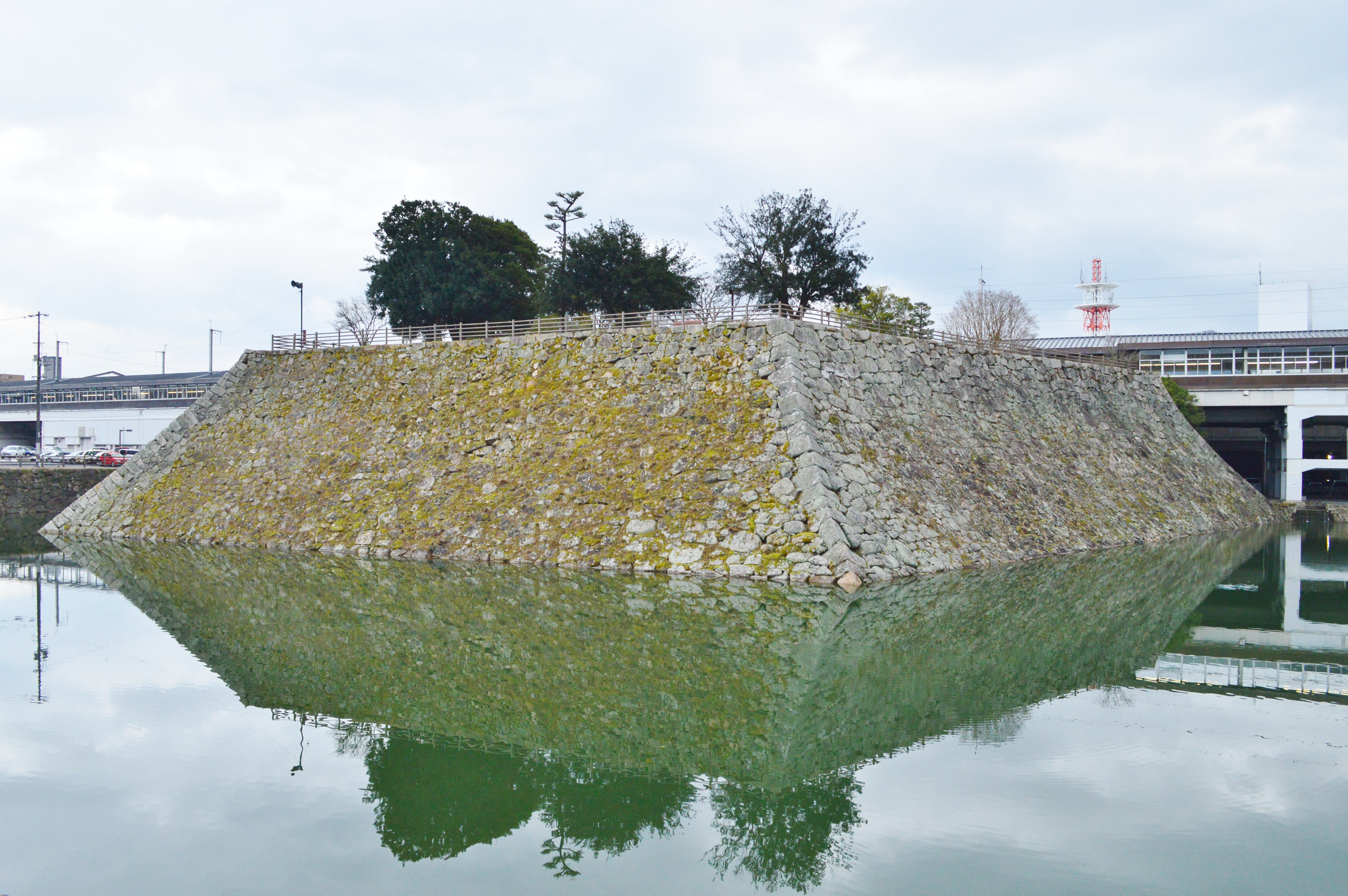
- Foundations of the tenshu of Mihara Castle

Site information
- Type: yamashiro-style Japanese castle
- Condition: ruins

Location
- Mihara Castle Mihara Castle (Japan)
- Coordinates: 34°24′4.62″N 133°4′57.57″E

Site history
- Built: 1567
- Built by: Kobayakawa Takakage
- Demolished: 1873

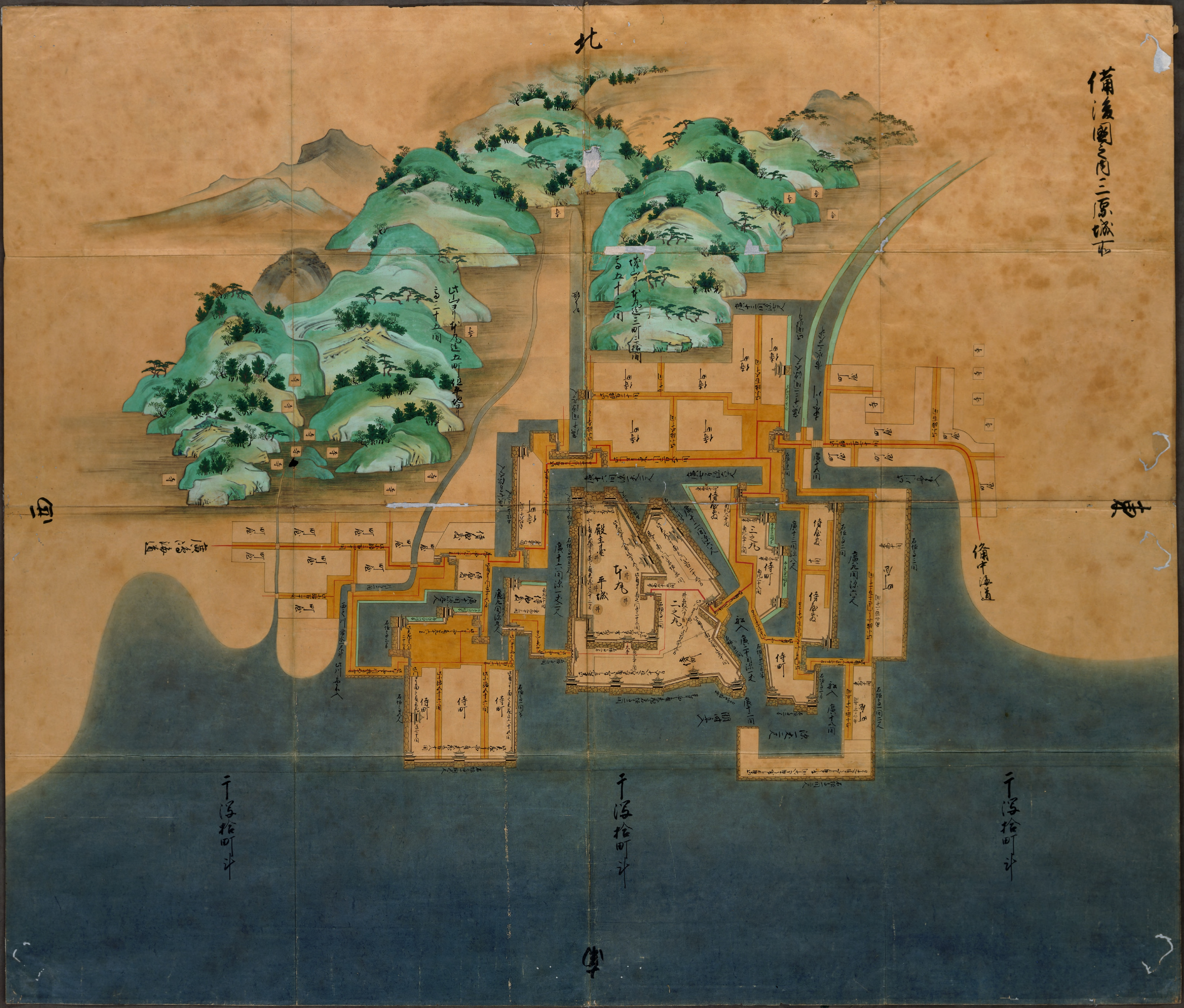
Layout of Mihara Castle in 1644

Mihara Castle (三原城, Mihara-jō) was a hirajiro-style Japanese castle located in what is today the city of Mihara in Hiroshima Prefecture. Its ruins have been protected by the central government as a National Historic Site since 1957.

== History ==
In 1552, Kobayakawa Takakage relocated his seat from Takayama Castle to Niitakayama Castle. Kobayakawa Takakage was the son of Mōri Motonari and over the next 20 years, the Kobayakawa clan helped the Mōri clan defeat the Ouchi clan and the Amago clan to secure supremacy over the Chugoku region of Japan. The Mōri entrusted the Kobayakawa with the San'yo region, whereas Kobayakawa Takakage's elder brother Kikkawa Motoharu was entrusted with the San'in region, and the Kobayakawa clan had a strong navy which enabled them to dominate the Seto Inland Sea. In 1567, Takakage newly built a new castle ten kilometers downstream from Niitakayama Castle, utilizing small islands at the mouth of Nuta River, and incorporating Sakurayama Castle, an older fortification which had been constructed by the Yamana clan in the early Muromachi period. The new Mihara Castle was initially a naval base and was needed as the harbor at Niitakayama Castle was becoming silted. From 1580 to 1588, the castle was greatly expanded and modernized with multiple concentric enclosures and numerous yagura watchtowers. As it was located directly on the seashore, it appeared to be floating on the sea at high tide, so it is also called Floating Castle (浮城, Uki-jō).

The Mōri and Kobayakawa eventually came into conflict with Oda Nobunaga, and subsequently with Toyotomi Hideyoshi. On Nobunaga's assassination in 1582, The Kobayakawa reached an accord with Hideyoshi, and Kobayakawa eventually became a vassal of Hideyoshi, who needed the Kobayakawa navy. Kobayakawa Takakage was awarded Iyo Province in Shikoku and later Chikuzen Province in Kyushu. Together with Kuroda Yoshitaka (Kanbe), he was one of Hideyoshi's most trusted military advisors. In 1595, Kobayakawa Takakage turned his estates in Chikuzen to his adopted son Hideaki, and retired to Mihara Castle. During the reconstruction of Mihara Castle, the stone walls and structures of Niitakayama Castle were gradually dismantled as building materials, and most of the jōkamachi was relocated to Mihara. The present tenshu foundation base dates from this reconstruction. At its height, the castle extended from the Akuhara River (Wakuhara River) in the east for about one kilometer to present-day Nishimachi to the west, and about 600 meters from the foot of Mt. Sakura in the north to Umanokuchi in the south. It had 32 corner yagura and 14 gates. The base of the tenshu was on the same scale as that of Edo Castle; however no tenshu was actually built. Contemporary drawings show three double-story interconnected yagura located on the base; however, one theory states that a three-story tower was relocated to Mihara Castle in 1615 from Tomojo Castle, after that fortification was destroyed in accordance with the shogunate's "One-Country One-Castle" decree.

The castle's fortifications were situated so that they encompassed the east–west route of the Sanyōdō highway, forcing travelers to traverse a narrow route between stone walls with many rivers and moats blocking the way. Due to its position on the border between Aki Province and Bingo Province, it was the most important eastern stronghold for the Mōri clan. Takakage died of illness at Mihara Castle in 1597. After the 1600 Battle of Sekigahara, the new Tokugawa shogunate assigned Aki and Bingo Provinces to Fukushima Masanori. Masanori made Hiroshima Castle his seat, using Mihara Castle as a secondary stronghold. In 1619, the castle was reassigned to the Asano clan, who replaced Fukushima Masanori at Hiroshima. It continued to be used as a branch castle of Hiroshima Domain until the end of the Edo period. During this period, the Honmaru Palace was rebuilt in 1663. In 1707, stone walls were repaired due to the effects of the 1707 Hōei earthquake. In the mid-Edo period.

After the Meiji Restoration, the castle grounds were secured by the government for the construction of the Japanese Imperial Navy Saikai Naval Base; however, this plan was canceled due to concerns about the sedimentation of the Nuta River. The remaining castle buildings and trees were put up for auction, and most of the buildings were disposed of as lumber. In 1894, during the construction of the Sanyō Railway's Mihara Station on the castle grounds most of the stone walls were removed as materials for the construction of Itozaki Port. Land reclamation, especially for the construction of Japan National Route 2 moved the castle further from the seashore. With the expansion and elevation of Mihara Station for the Sanyo Shinkansen in 1975, the castle grounds were further divided. At present all that remains is the tenshu foundation, some disconnected remnants of stone walls and moats and the foundations of a gate and couple of yagura. The remaining ruins are preserved as a park. The base of the tenshu still stands and it is possible to stand on it and get a good view of Mihara City.

The castle was listed as one of the Continued 100 Fine Castles of Japan in 2017.

== Gallery ==
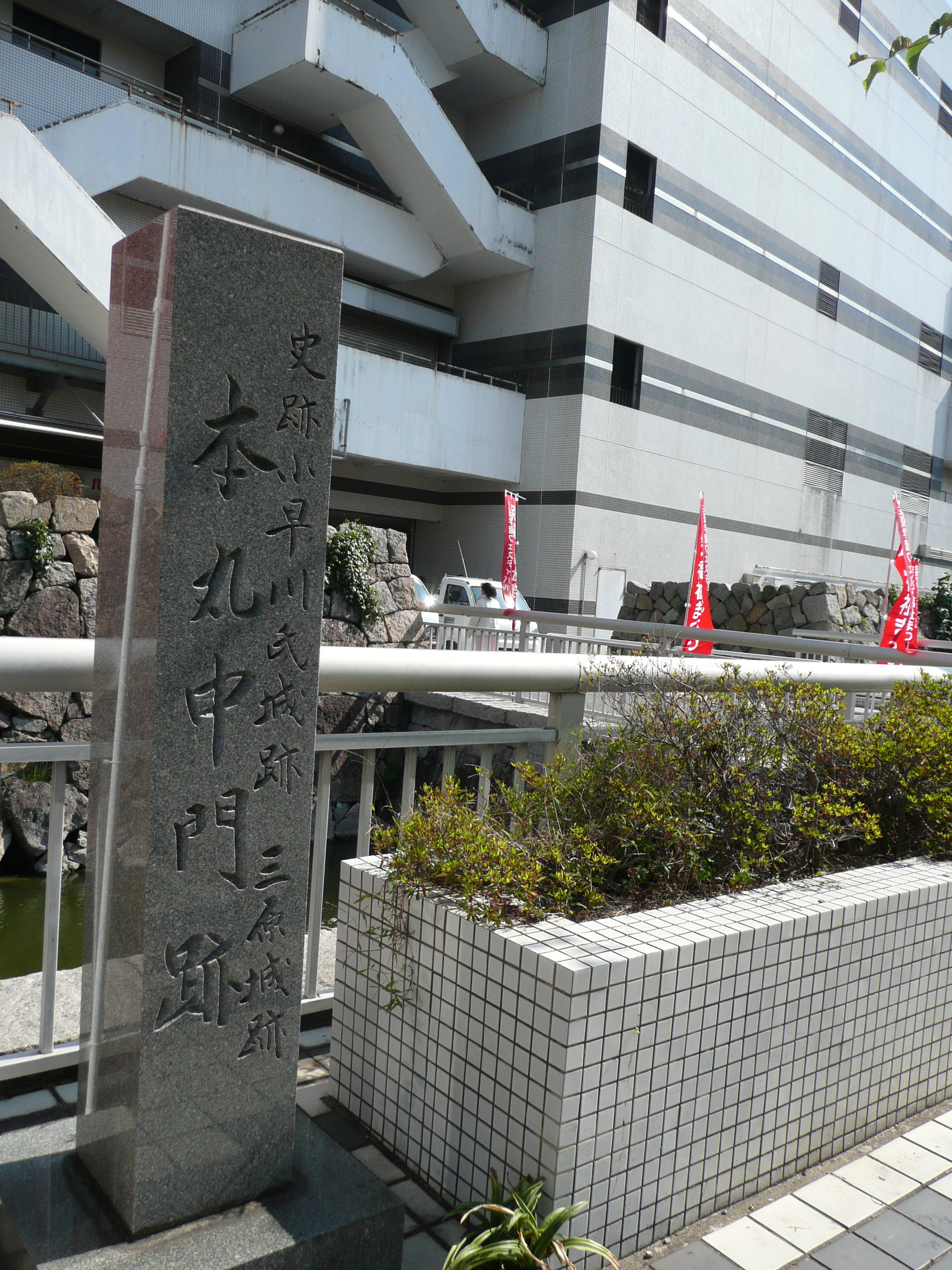
Mark in gate of center of castle

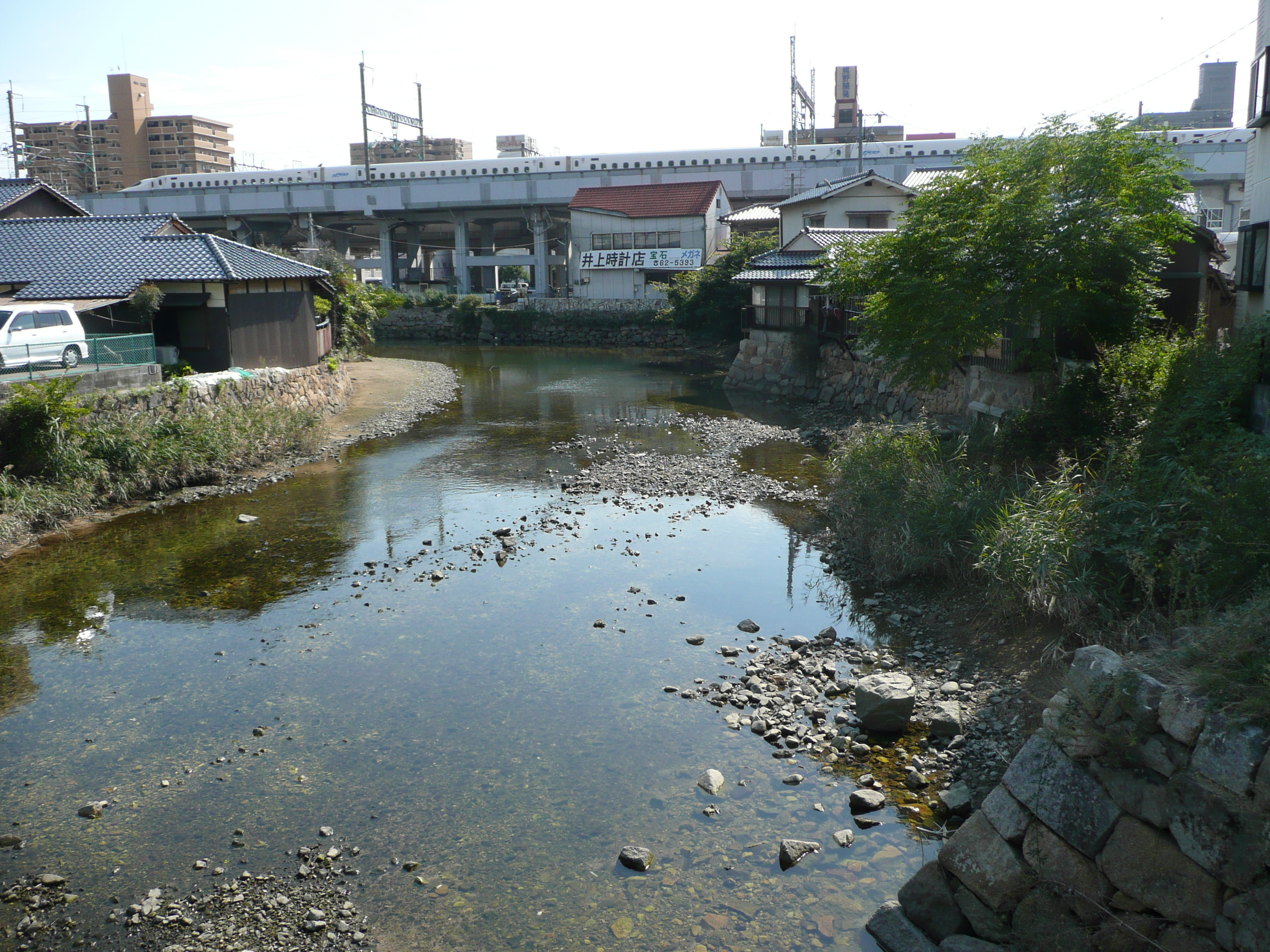
Stone wall that exists in circumference of nearby river

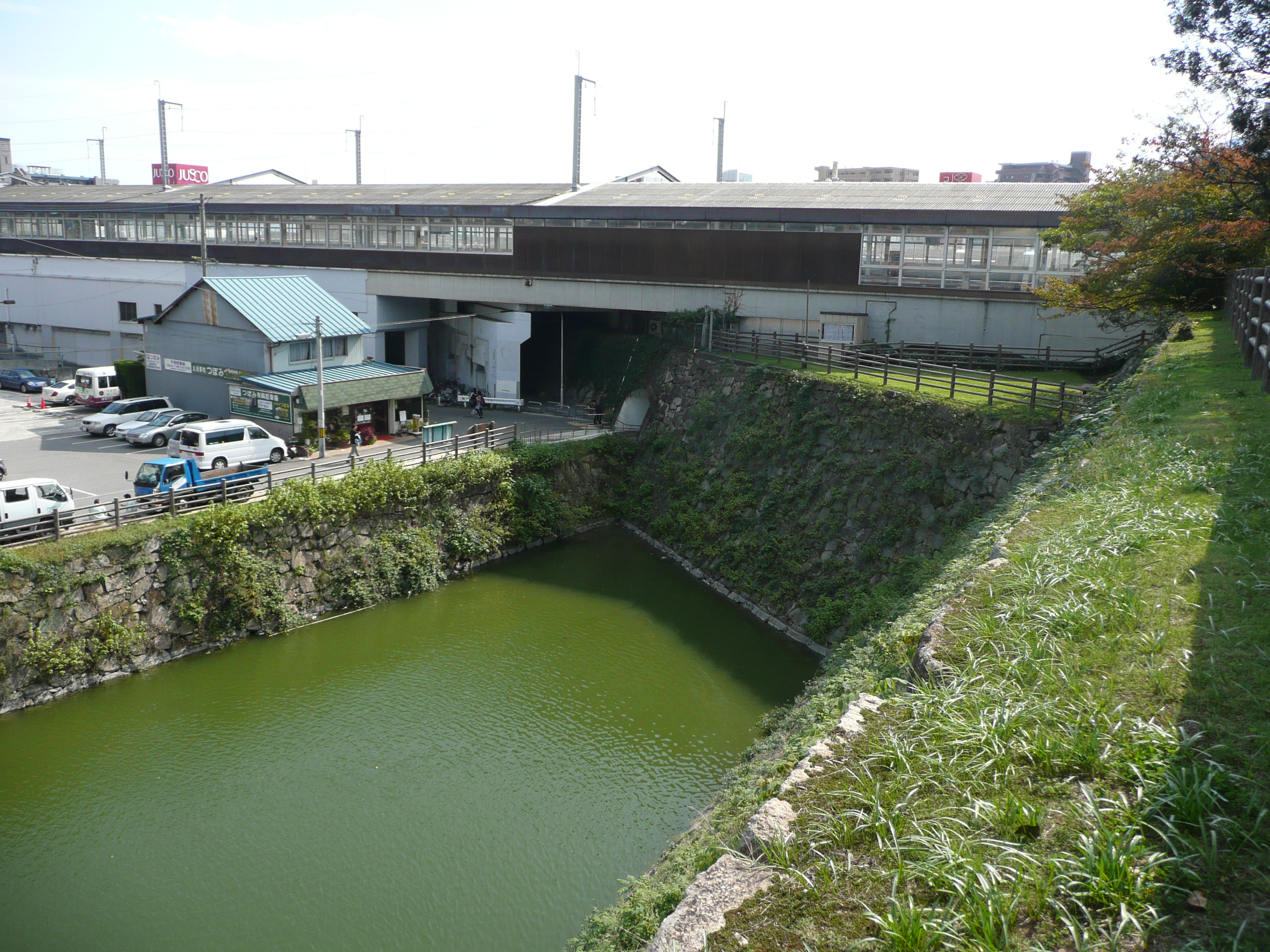
Stone wall that digs into Mihara Station

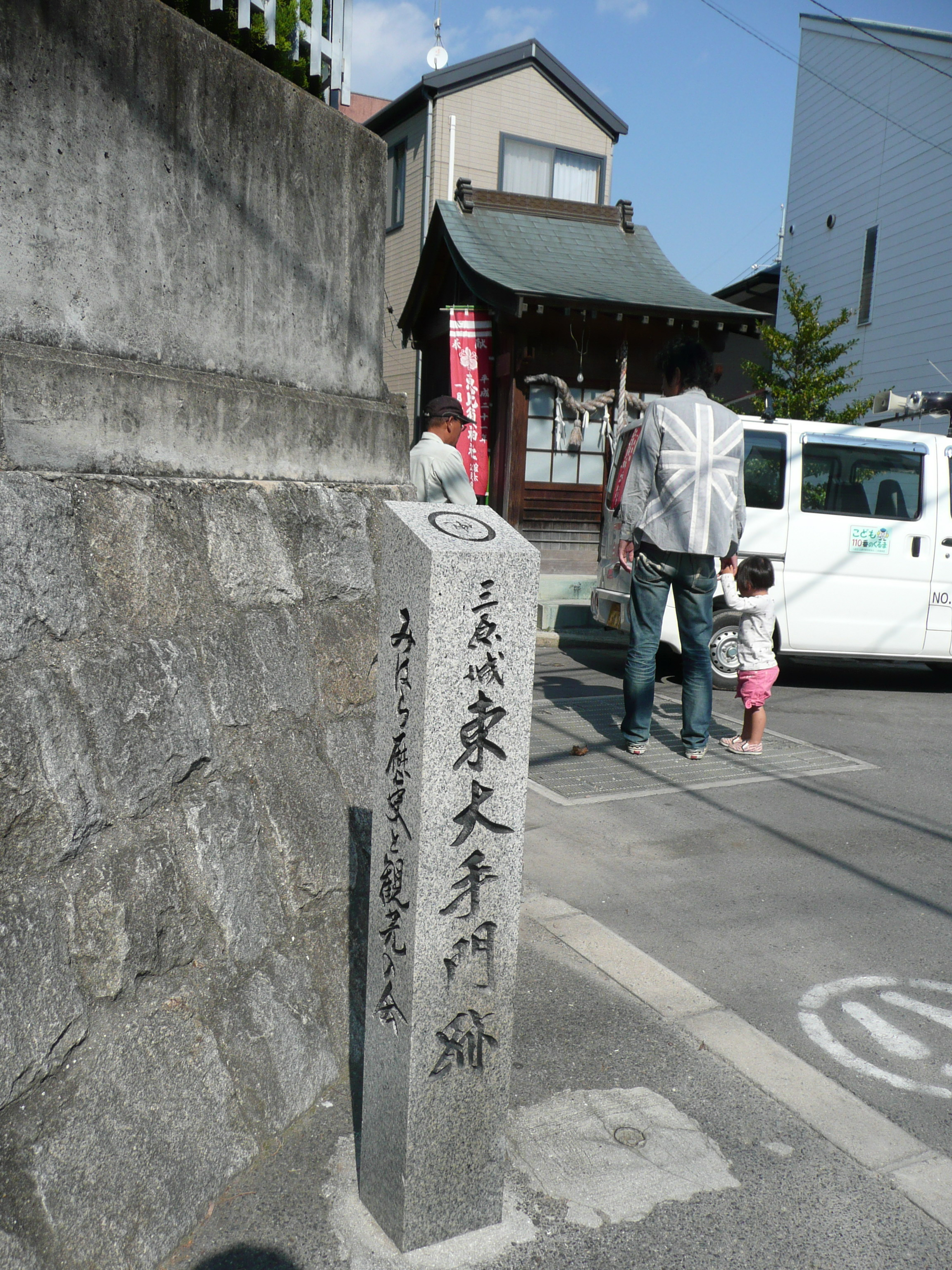
Mark in gate in the east

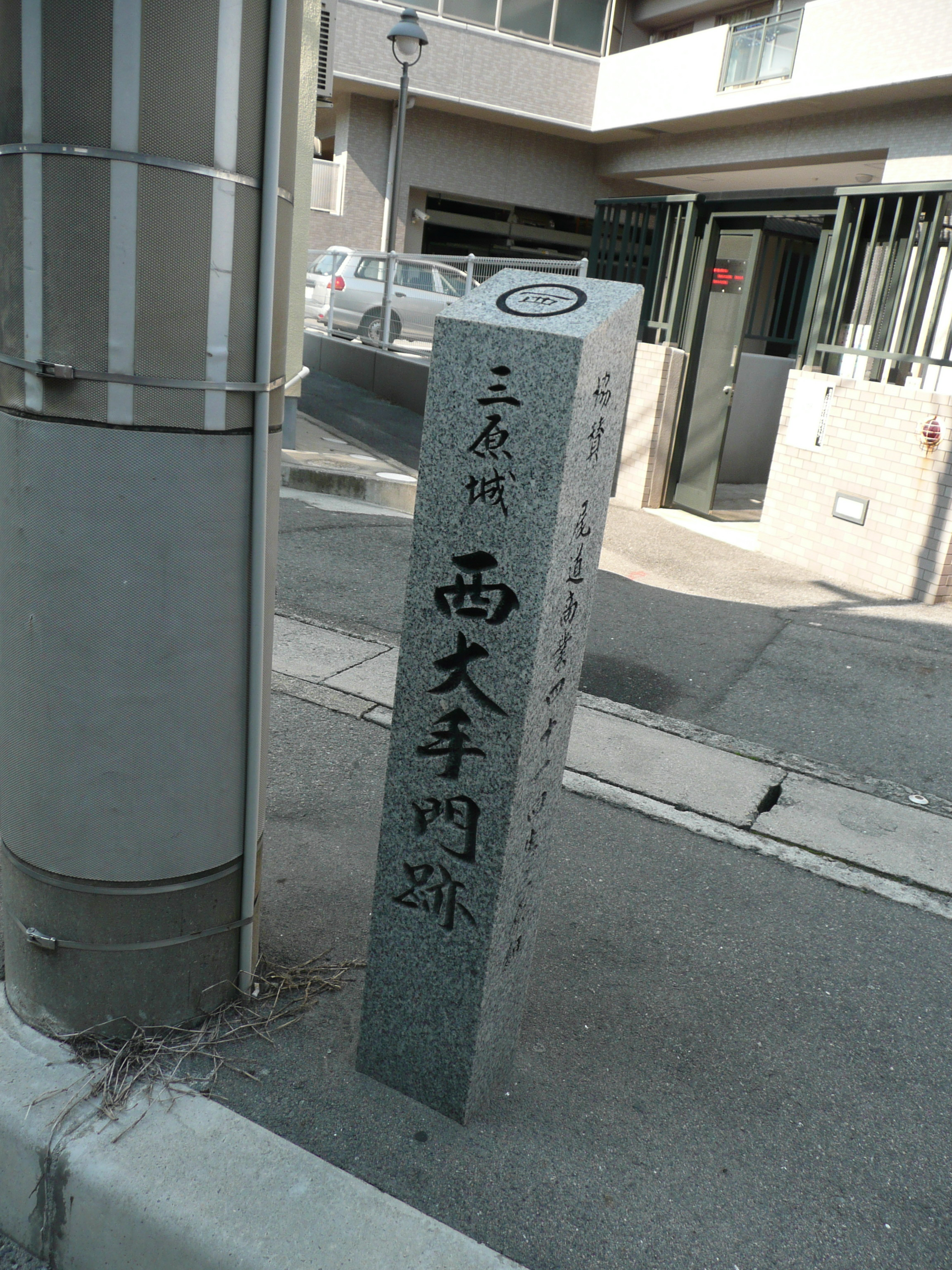
Mark in gate in the west

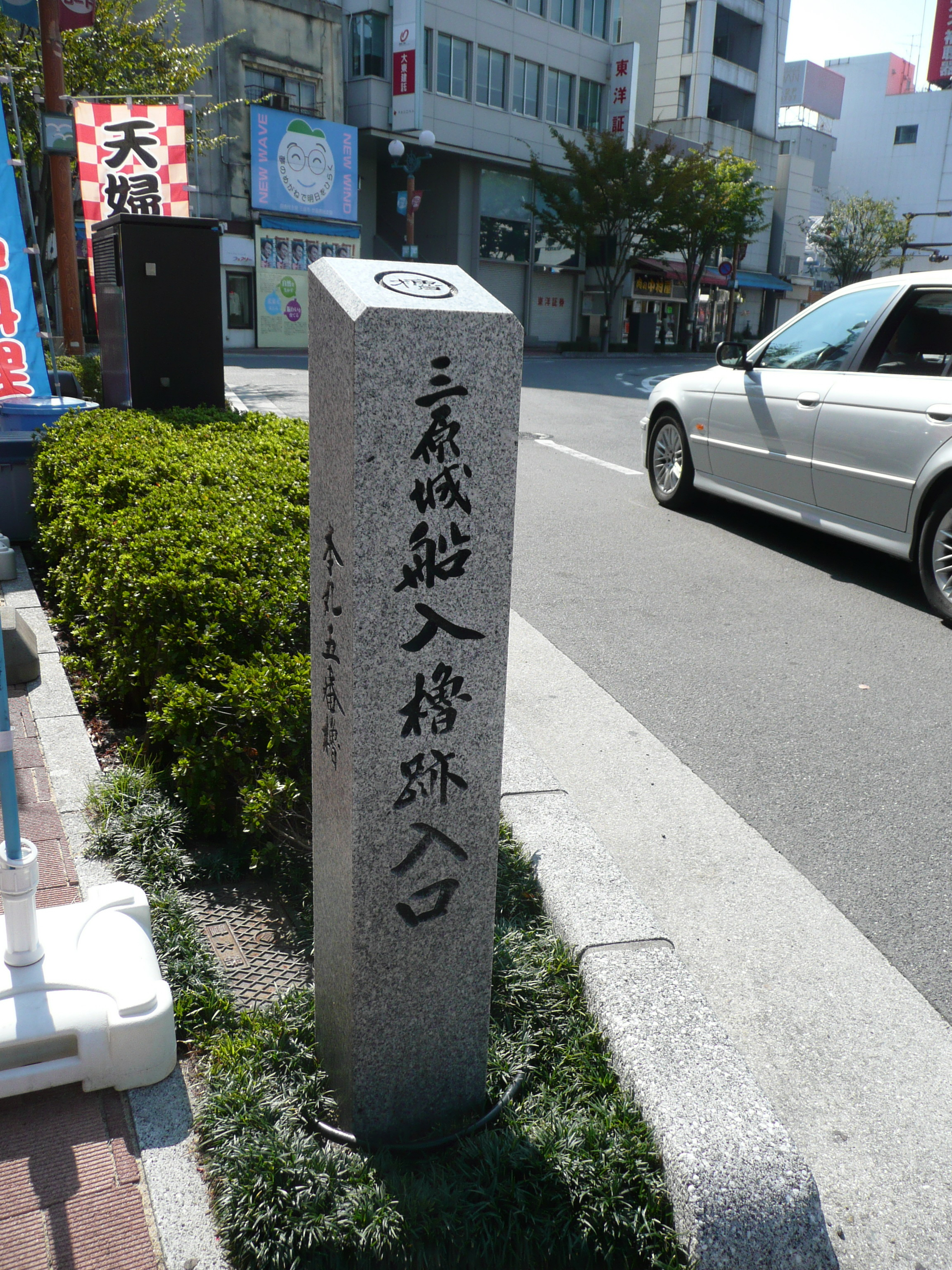
Mark in Port in castle

== See also ==
- List of Historic Sites of Japan (Hiroshima)

== Literature ==
- De Lange, William (2021). An Encyclopedia of Japanese Castles. Groningen: Toyo Press. pp. 600 pages. ISBN 978-9492722300.
- Sansom, George (1961). A History of Japan: 1334–1615. Stanford, California: Stanford University Press
- Turnbull, Stephen (1998). The Samurai Sourcebook. London: Cassell & Co.
