= Kobayakawa Takakage =

Japanese daimyo (1533–1597)

- 小早川 隆景
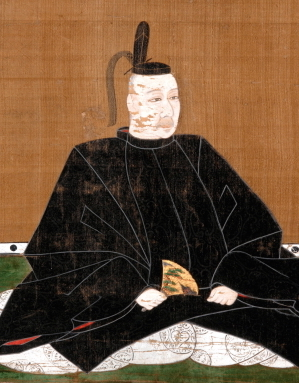

Head of Kobayakawa clan
- In office 1574–1597
- Preceded by: Kobayakawa Shigehira
- Succeeded by: Kobayakawa Hideaki

Personal details
- Born: 1533 Yoshida, Aki Province
- Died: July 26, 1597 (aged 63–64) Mihara Domain, Bingo Province
- Spouse: Lady Toida
- Parents: Mōri Motonari (father); Lady Myōkyū (mother)
- Nickname(s): Tokujumaru (徳寿丸) “Mōri Ryōsen", or “Mōri's Two Rivers" (毛利両川).

Military service
- Allegiance: Mōri clan Toyotomi clan
- Rank: Daimyō, Chūnagon
- Unit: Kobayakawa clan
- Commands: Mihara Castle
- Battles/wars: Battle of Miyajima (1555); Siege of Moji (1561); Battle of Torisaka (1568); Battle of Tatarahama (1569); Siege of Takamatsu (1582); Invasion of Shikoku (1585); Kyūshū Campaign (1586); Siege of Odawara (1590); Korean Campaign (1592)

Kobayakawa Takakage (小早川 隆景; 1533 – July 26, 1597) was a samurai and daimyō (feudal military lord) during the Sengoku period and Azuchi–Momoyama period. He was the third son of Mōri Motonari who was adopted by the Kobayakawa clan and became its 14th clan head. He merged the two branches of the Kobayakawa, the Takehara-Kobayakawa clan (竹原小早川氏) and Numata-Kobayakawa clan (沼田小早川氏). He became an active commander of the Mōri army and he with his brother Kikkawa Motoharu became known as the “Mōri Ryōsen", or “Mōri's Two Rivers" (毛利両川). As head of the Kobayakawa clan, he expanded the clan's territory in the Chūgoku region (western Honshū), and fought for the Mōri clan in all their campaigns

At first he opposed Oda Nobunaga and Toyotomi Hideyoshi but later swore loyalty and became a retainer of Hideyoshi who awarded him domains in Iyo Province on Shikoku and Chikuzen Province on Kyūshū, totalling 350,000 koku. Hideyoshi gave him the title Chūnagon also appointed him to the Council of Five Elders but died before Hideyoshi himself.

== Biography ==
=== Early life ===
He was born in 1533 with the childhood name Tokujumaru (徳寿丸) as the third son of Mōri Motonari and his main wife Myōkyū. In 1541 the 13th head of the Takehara branch of the Kobayakawa clan, Kobayakawa Okikage (小早川興景), got ill and died while attacking Sato-Kanayama Castle (佐東銀山城). In November, 1543 since he had no heir Tokujumaru was declared successor because he was a cousin of Okikage's wife. So at twelve years of age he had become the 14th head of the Takehara-Kobayakawa clan (竹原小早川氏) and received the name Kobayakawa Takakage (小早川隆景).

In 1547, when Ōuchi Yoshitaka attacked Kannabe castle (神辺城) in Bingo Province, Takakage served as one of his commanders and was highly commended for capturing Kannabe castle's support castle (支城), the Ryuoyama Fort (龍王山砦) with the Kobayakawa army alone.

The other branch of the Kobayakawa clan was the Numata-Kobayakawa clan (沼田小早川氏). The head of the family, Kobayakawa Shigehira (小早川繁平) was young and blind due to an eye disease so in 1550 it was decided that Takakage would become heir of the Numata branch and finally merge the two rival branches of the clan. The Takehara-Kobayakawa branch ceased to exist and Takakage moved into Takayama Castle (高山城), the main base of the Numata branch. In 1552 Takakage decided to build a new main castle across the Numata River (沼田川) and called it is Niitakayama Castle (新高山城). He married Lady Toida, daughter of Kobayakawa Masahira and sister of the blind Kobayakawa Shigehira in order to cement his succession. They would never have children for unknown reasons but they would later adopt to keep the clan alive.

Japan in 1570 showing the extent of the Mōri clan.

After this the Kobayakawa clan was incorporated into the clans following the powerful Mōri clan of his father, Mōri Motonari. The Kobayakawa would become an important naval force under the direct control of his father. His older brother, the second son of Motonari was adopted into the Kikkawa clan and became Kikkawa Motoharu. They were both together pillars of the Mōri forces and were known as "Mōri's Two Rivers" (Mōri Ryōsen, 毛利両川).

In 1555 at the Battle of Miyajima, Takakage led his naval forces under control of the Mōri clan and broke the naval blockade of the Ōuchi clan forces under the command of Sue Harukata. He sailed straight toward Miyao Castle in a feint, then retreated so he could be in a position to return the following day, his attack synchronized with the overland assault. At dawn, Takakage and his 1,500 troops landed before the small fortress, and the sound of shell trumpets signalled that all units were in position and the attack commenced. As Takakage's force rushed the front gate of Miyao Castle, Mōri and his troops hit the Ōuchi position from behind. Caught completely by surprise, many of the Ōuchi troops scattered in disarray. Hundreds tried to swim to the mainland and drowned in the attempt. Many more saw that defeat was inevitable and committed seppuku (honorable suicide). By 18 October 1555, resistance had ended at a cost of about 4,700 dead among the Ōuchi army. Sue Harukata escaped from the confines of Miyao Castle, but when he saw that escape from the island was not possible, he also committed suicide by seppuku.

In 1557 Takakage took part of the Conquest of Bōcho (防長経略) and the Mōri forces took both Suō Province and Nagato Province of the Ōuchi clan and Ōuchi Yoshinaga committed suicide. They took Yoshinaga's Moji Castle in 1558 but in September, 1559 it was retaken by Ōtomo Yoshishige. Then in 1561 Kobayakawa again led the Mōri navy in the recapture of the castle in the Siege of Moji. During the same year his father, Mōri Motonari retired in favor of his first son and heir apparent (Takakage's eldest brother), Mōri Takamoto. Under Takamoto, Takakage continued to be a main force of the Mōri along with his second older brother Kikkawa Motoharu. In 1561

In 1563 Mōri Takamoto suddenly died of illness and his son (Takakage's nephew) Mōri Terumoto became head of the Mōri clan. While the 2nd brother Kikkawa Motoharu was in charge of military affairs, Takakage took responsibility of political affairs. He worked on diplomacy, taking advantage of the information gathering capabilities of the military. In the Siege of Toda Castle (1562–1566) they destroyed their enemy, the Amako clan (尼子氏). During the following year of 1567 he was dispatched to help the Kôno clan (河野氏) of Iyo Province and at the Battle of Torisaka captured Ozu Castle (大洲城) forcing Utsunomiya Toyotsuna (宇都宮豊綱) to surrender. Takakage was then also dispatched to fight the Ōtomo clan (大友氏) in Kyūshū. When Murakami Michiyasu (村上通康) died that year Takakage sent his widow who was a daughter of Kôno Michinao to marry Shishido Takaie.

In 1568 Kobayakawa Takakage fought in the Battle of Torisaka and the 1568 Battle of Tatarahama. In 1570 he fought in the Battle of Nunobeyama. In 1571, Takakage was sent to help the Mimura clan (三村氏) of Kojima (児島), Bizen Province against Urakami Munekage (浦上宗景) but the Murakami and Awa Pirates helped and Takakage was forced to withdraw to Aki Province.

After the death of Mōri Motonari in 1571, "Mōri's Two Rivers" (Kobayakawa Takakage and Kikkawa Motoharu) became more important as assistants to Mōri Terumoto against the remnants of their enemies, the Ōtomo clan (大友氏), Amako clan (尼子氏), and Ōuchi clan (大内氏).

=== Conflict against Ōtomo clan ===
In 1556 at May 19, Dōsetsu's forces finally manage to quell the rebellions incited by Akimoto, and he later sent recommendation letters of his subordinates who gave outstanding performance during this operation, such as Korenobu Yufu, Takano Daizen, Adachi Sakyō, and Ando Iesada.

In 1557, the Akizuki clan rebelled due to their collaboration with Mōri Motonari, to which Sorin responded by sending Tachibana Dōsetsu and Usuki Akisumi with 2,000 soldiers to quell their rebellion. Dōsetsu besieged the Akizuki clan which was led by Akizuki Kiyotane in Mount Kosho castle. In the end, Kiyotane and his son committed seppuku inside their castle.

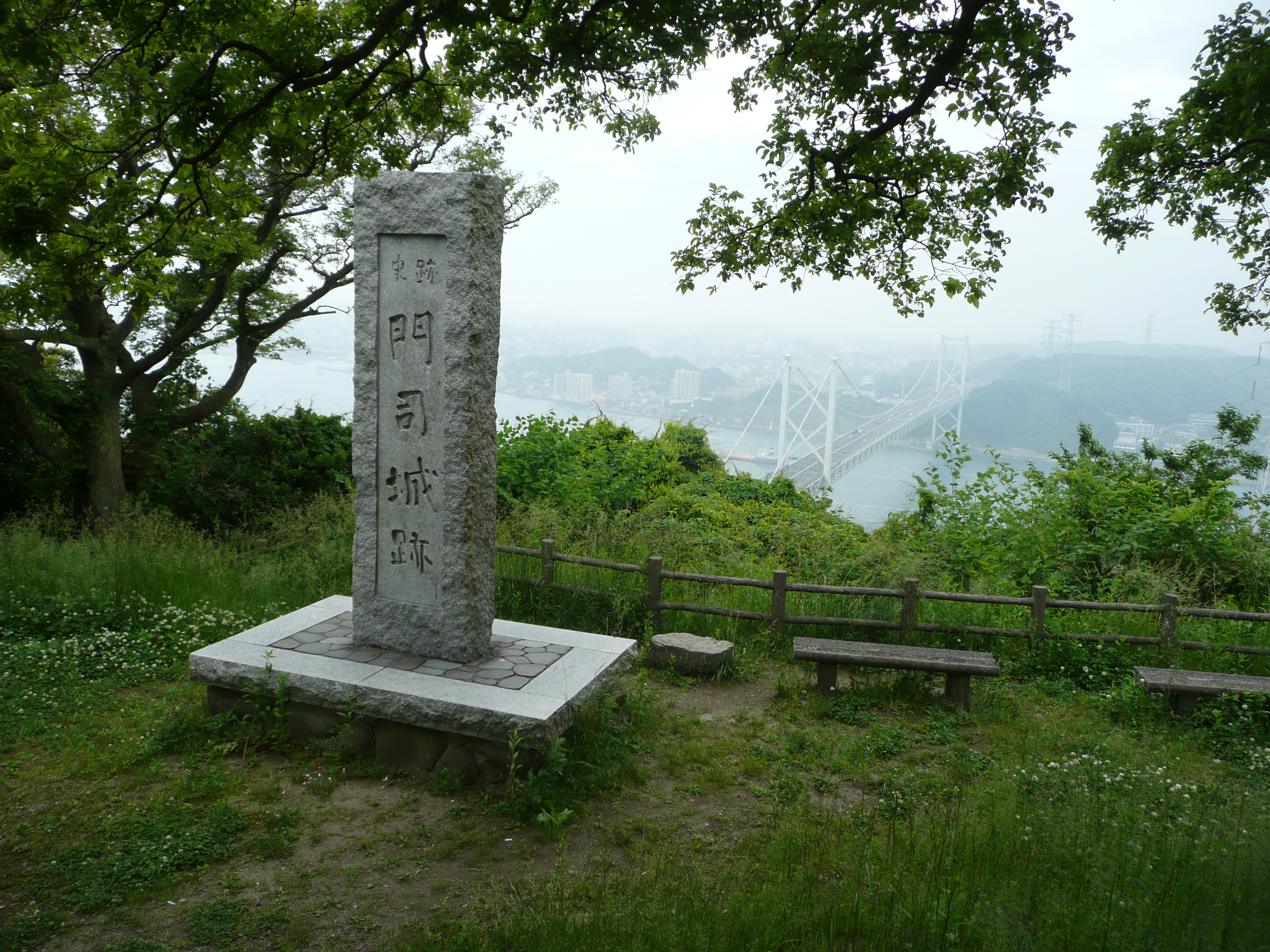
The site of the ruined Moji castle

In the next year of 1558, Dōsetsu fought Mōri clan sent Takakage in the first siege of Moji castle. In this battle, Dōsetsu had 800 of his archers shower Kobayakama's army with arrows. As the Dōsetsu continues his siege until 1562, Dōsetsu entered the last phase of this Siege of Moji, where he enlisted the help of traders from Portuguese Empire In this battle, the Portuguese merchants assisted Dōsetsu with three ships weighted between 500-600 tons, The bombardment from the ships allowed the Ōtomo troops to establish themselves around Moji castle. However, the castle defenders manage to break the siege after the Portuguese has spent all their ammunitions and withdrew from this operation. Despite the Ōtomo forces under Dōsetsu launching another attempt at besieging the castle in 10 October 1561, they failed to subdue the castle.

In 1562 of July 13, Dōsetsu and his subordinate Korenobu Yufu, has defeated the Mōri clan army in the battle in Yanagigaura in Buzen Province. Later, Dōsetsu stormed Moji castle on October 13 and they managed to subdue the castle which was defended by Reizei Mototoyo, a former Ouchi clan vassal who was 25 years old. On November 26, there was a battle all day long near Moji Castle, leaving hundreds injured and dead with an unclear result. In 1563, on the New Year's Day of 6th year of Eiroku, a large army led by Mōri Takamoto and Kobayakawa Takakage arrived to relieve Moji castle. The army of Dōsetsu and Mōri Takamoto entered a standoff until an intermediary envoy from Kyoto arrived sending a message from the Ashikaga shogunate to both Dōsetsu and Takamoto to stop their conflict. In the same year, Dōsetsu changed his name from Akitsura into Dōsetsu. In 1564 July 25, the mediator from the Shogunate secured an agreement of temporary peace treaty between the Mōri clan and the Ōtomo clan. However, this truce did not last long as on March 25, Dōsetsu once again fought the Mōri clan army which was led by Koremaki Yufu in The Fourth Battle of Yanagigaura.

In 1569, Dōsetsu was involved in the failed defense of the Siege of Tachibana castle, where the army under Mōri Motonari beat Dosetsu forces with the extensive use of cannons. Later in the same year, Dōsetsu personally led the Otomo forces against the Mōri clan in Tatara area (located in modern day Higashi-ku, Fukuoka), where they engaged in at least four battles which ended in deadlocks.

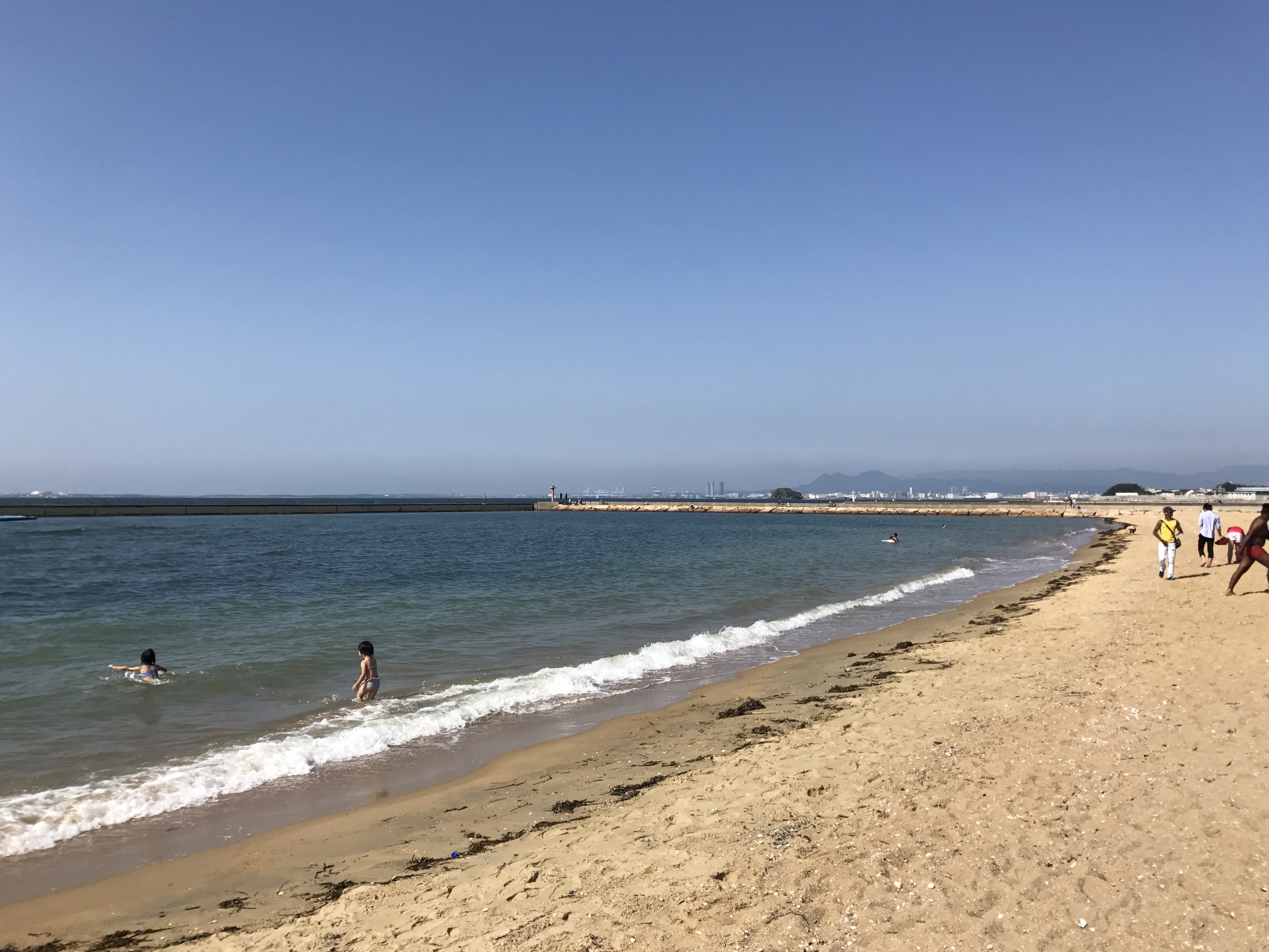
Hakata Bay, where Dōsetsu fought the Mōri clan army at the Battle of Tatarahama

In May 18, after several engagements at the Battle of Tatarahama, the Ōtomo army led by Dōsetsu, Usuki Akisumi, and Yoshihiro Akimasa clashed against 40,000 soldiers under Kikkawa Motoharu and Kobayakawa Takakage. During the fierce battle between the two sides, Dōsetsu lead the charge into the enemy formation and killed more than ten enemies and manage to beat the vanguard of Motoharu which was led by Yoshikawa Motoharu's vanguard led by Nobuki Narazaki. Then, Yoshikawa Motoharu used iron cannons to counterattack. The situation was described as dire for the Ōtomo side before Dōsetsu charged towards a gap in the formation of Takakage's army, allowing other Dōsetsu generals to reorganize themselves and rearrange their artillery. Dōsetsu rode his horse and charged forward unto the enemy camp while drawing his sword.The army of Motoharu and Takakage was unable to resist and was pushed back.

Following the battle of Tatatahama, there are about 18 more clashes in the area from 21–26 May, between Dōsetsu army against Takakage and other Mōri generals with undetermined results. However, in the end Takakage forced to relinquish the castle of Tachibana again to Dōsetsu, since the Mōri and Ōtomo clan sign truce peace negotiation with the result that Mōri clan should give back the Tachibana castle to Ōtomo.

=== Conflict with Nobunaga ===
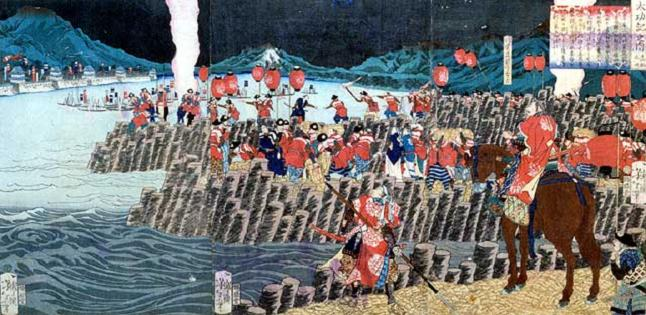
Siege of Takamatsu Castle

The 15th shōgun of the Ashikaga shogunate, Ashikaga Yoshiaki had a falling out with Oda Nobunaga in 1576 and invited Mōri Terumoto to join the 3rd Nobunaga Encirclement Plan (第3次信長包囲網). The alliance consisted of Ashikaga Yoshiaki, Mōri Terumoto, Uesugi Kenshin, Takeda Katsuyori and the Ishiyama Hongan-ji monks. The allies really didn't have too much success against the powerful Oda armies. The significant event here is the formation of all these powerful men, who were oftentimes not the best of friends. That same year (1576) at the First Battle of Kizugawaguchi, Kobayakawa Takakage led the Mōri naval forces with Murakami Takeyoshi. The Mōri navy successfully thwarted an Oda blockade of the Ishiyama Honganji led by Kuki Yoshitaka.

Two years later in 1578 at the Second Battle of Kizugawaguchi, Takakage was leading the naval forces again. The Ishiyama Hongan-ji was still under siege, and Oda's fleet, commanded once again by Kuki Yoshitaka, made another attempt to break the Mōri supply lines. Going against convention, Yoshitaka fought with six very large ō-adakebune ships, rather than a combination of small (kobaya), medium (sekibune), and large (adakebune) craft. Normally, adakebune were essentially wooden floating fortresses, covered in gun and bow emplacements. According to some accounts, it may be believed that these six were the first ironclads, and were built such that guns could not penetrate them. However, rather than true ironclads, made primarily or entirely of metal, these craft probably simply had limited iron plating in key locations. Several Mōri vessels were burned and sunk, and Oda's fleet ultimately achieved victory. The supply lines were broken, and the Hongan-ji fell soon afterwards. However, during this battle an interesting flaw was discovered in the ō-adakebune design. As Mōri samurai rushed to board the large ship, all the defending warriors ran to that side of the deck, to defend themselves, and the ship capsized as its center of gravity shifted. Also in 1578 the "2nd Oda Encirclement Plan" falls apart when Uesugi Kenshin suddenly dies and the Ishiyama Hongan-ji monks made peace with Oda Nobunaga.

Hashiba Hideyoshi (羽柴秀吉) who is later known as Toyotomi Hideyoshi was a general under Oda Nobunaga in charge of the push into the Chūgoku region. He had increasingly intense tactics and the Mōri forces continued to be pushed backwards. In 1579, Ukita Naoie of Bizen Province believed the fight against Nobunaga was hopeless and claimed illness, only sending a small token force to aid the Mōri. In 1580, Miki Castle (三木城) of Harima Province which had held off the Oda forces for two years falls. In addition in 1581, Tottori Castle (鳥取城) of Inaba Province falls after falling prey to starvation and the castle master, Kikkawa Tsuneie (吉川経家) commits suicide.

In 1582 the Siege of Takamatsu on Takamatsu Castle of Bitchū Province begins. Takakage led the main force of the Mōri along with Mōri Terumoto and Kikkawa Motoharu leading 30,000 men. However, Hashiba Hideyoshi, who also had 30,000 men was faring well and Oda Nobunaga's main army who had just finished defeating the Takeda clan were marching towards the Chūgoku region. Takekage began secret negotiations with Hideyoshi using his diplomats Hayashi Narinaga and Ankokuji Ekei. In June of that year Hideyoshi hears about Oda Nobunaga's demise at the Honnō-ji incident by the hands of his former retainer Akechi Mitsuhide and hurries back to Kyoto to get revenge for his master. Akechi Mitsuhide had sent a secret letter to Mōri Terumoto promising him great things but Hideyoshi's men intercepted the messenger. Hideyoshi then sent for Mōri diplomats Hayashi Narinaga and Ankokuji Ekei not telling them that Nobunaga had been assassinated. He proposed peace if the Mōri would cede to him the provinces of Hoki, Mimasaka and Bitchu. The diplomats thought that Mimasaka had already basically fallen, and Hoki was just a matter of time. Also Shimizu Muneharu, the defender of Takamatsu Castle must commit suicide. Mōri Terumoto had found out about the Honnō-ji incident and wanted to attack Hideyoshi but was stopped by the advice of Kobayakawa Takakage and the two diplomats who were well respected in the Mōri clan. Takakage is said to have said, "It is a shame for the samurai to make peace before the blood of our friends has dried on their swords."

That year in 1582, Takakage had moved his main castle of Niitakayama Castle (新高山城) to Mihara Castle facing the Seto Inland Sea.

=== Service under Hideyoshi ===
In 1583 when Hideyoshi defeated Shibata Katsuie at the Battle of Shizugatake the Mōri had retained neutrality but they abandoned the opportunistic line and reached out to become subordinates of Hideyoshi. At this time Kobayakawa Takakage offers up his adopted son, Kobayakawa Hidekane, who is really his younger brother as hostage to Hideyoshi.

After this Takakage cooperates positively with Hideyoshi and in 1585 during Hideyoshi's Invasion of Shikoku he defeats Kaneko Motoie (金子元宅) of Iyo Province. For his service he was given Iyo Province as his fief and that year he moved into Yuzuki Castle (湯築城) and Ōzu Castle (大洲城) but keeps Mihara Castle as his main base. He also took the former secretary of the Kaneko clan, Saionji Kinmochi (西園寺公広) as a vassal. In addition, the control of Iyo by Takakage is excellent and the Portuguese missionary, Luís Fróis, praises that "Takakage governs the country quietly with a deep thought and it is unusual in Japan that there is no terror or rebellion in the country of Iyo".

Starting in 1586 Takakage took part in Hideyoshi's Kyūshū Campaign and after the campaign Hideyoshi awarded him with Chikuzen Province, Chikugo Province and Hizen Province of Kyūshū totalling 371,300 koku. However, Takakage tried to object saying that it was impossible for the three clans of Mōri, Kikkawa and Kobayakawa to administer these provinces adequately since they already had seven to eight provinces in the Chugoku region and now on top of that the three in Kyūshū. On the contrary, Hideyoshi tried to make him administer the provinces by making two of them public but Takakage repeatedly decline and said that his nephew Mōri Terumoto was still too young and his brother Kikkawa Motoharu had already died. He proposed to install substitute officers in Chikuzen and Chikugo and also would alternate with Sassa Narimasa (佐々成政) every half a year or year. Hideyoshi refused his resignation of the provinces and this was an opportunity for Takakage to become an independent lord under the Toyotomi administration.

In 1587, his retainer Kōno Michinao (河野通直) who he had transferred to Takehara died. This left Takakage with the problem of taking care of the provinces in Kyūshū without help and by the suspicious nature of his death he may have been assassinated by Hideyoshi himself. Since Saionji Kinmochi (西園寺公広) was also killed at the same time, during Takakage's transportation of men to Kyūshū it seems Hideyoshi was trying to take power away from the Kobayakawa clan by eliminating his best supporters. Hideyoshi was known to do this on separate other occasions.

The Toyotomi uji was simultaneously granted to a number of Hideyoshi's chosen allies, who adopted the new uji "豊臣朝臣" (Toyotomi no asomi, courtier of Toyotomi). In July, 1588, he gave this to Takakage. Two years later he participated in the Siege of Odawara (1590) when he took Tokugawa Ieyasu's Okazaki Castle.

In 1592 when Hideyoshi orders the Japanese invasions of Korea (1592–98), Takakage mobilizes 10,000 soldiers as captain of the 6th division and attacks Jeolla Province but he is met with resistance and unable to capture the province completely. He was then relocated in 1593 to Gyeonggi Province where he fought in the Battle of Byeokjegwan with Tachibana Muneshige where they repelled the reinforcement forces of the Ming dynasty.

In 1594 there is a letter sent to the commanders of the Mōri forces in Korea. It was addressed to Kobayakawa Takakage from Katō Kiyomasa saying that Hideyoshi wanted to give his nephew Hashiba Hideaki (羽柴秀俊) as an adopted son to the Mōri clan for adoption. Mōri Terumoto was already 40 years old and had no heir. Fearing that this would make the heir to the Mōri clan someone without Mōri blood he adopted Hideaki himself and he became known as Kobayakawa Hideaki.

== Death ==
In 1595 Takakage was appointed to the Council of Five Elders by Hideyoshi along with Ukita Hideie, Maeda Toshiie, Uesugi Kagekatsu, and the famous Tokugawa Ieyasu. Then he handed over his estate to his adopted son Kobayakawa Hideaki and retired to Mihara Castle. Hideyoshi gave him a retirement fief of 50,150 koku. He also built Najima Castle (名島城) in Fukuoka. Takakage died two years later at Mihara Castle on July 26, 1597, and was buried at Beisan Temple (Beisan-ji, 米山寺) in Nuta, Numata.

After the death of Takakage the role of the "Mōri's Two Rivers" went to his nephews Kikkawa Hiroie (吉川広家) and Mōri Hidemoto (毛利秀元).

On hearing the news of Takakage's death, Kuroda Kanbei lamented and said: "The last wise man in Japan has gone."

== Family ==
Mon of Kobayakawa clan (Hidari mitsudomoe).

- Father: Mōri Motonari (毛利元就, 1497–1571)
- Mother: Myōkyū (妙玖, 1499–1546) – daughter of Kikkawa Kunitsune (吉川国経).
  - Adoptive father: Kobayakawa Okikage (小早川興景, 1519–1541)
- Siblings:
  - Sister: name unknown - died young, taken hostage by the Takahashi clan (高橋氏) and later killed.
  - Brother: Mōri Takamoto (毛利隆元, 1523–1563)
  - Sister: Goryū no Tsubone (五龍局, d. 1574) – wife of Shishido Takaie (宍戸隆家).
  - Brother: Kikkawa Motoharu (吉川元春, 1530–1586)
  - Half-brother: Ninomiya Naritoki (二宮就辰, 1546–1607)
  - Half-brother: Hoida Motokiyo (穂井田元清, 1551–1597)
  - Half-brother: Suginomori Motoaki (椙杜元秋, 1552–1585)
  - Half-brother: Izuha Mototomo (出羽元倶, 1555–1571)
  - Half-brother: Amano Motomasa (天野元政, 1559–1609)
  - Half-brother: Suetsugu Motoyasu (末次元康, 1560–1601)
  - Half-brother: Kobayakawa Hidekane (小早川秀包, 1567–1601)
- Wife: Lady Toida, daughter of Kobayakawa Masahira (d. 1619)
- Adopted Children:
  - Kobayakawa Hidekane (1567–1601) (also Takakage's half-brother)
  - Kobayakawa Hideaki (小早川秀秋, 1567–1601)(The nephew of Toyotomi Hideyoshi)

== Retainers ==
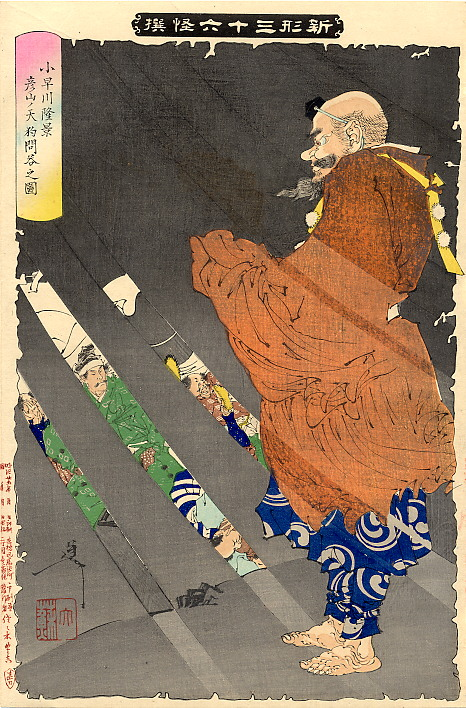
depicts Kobayakawa Takakage debating the tengu of Mount Hiko.

- Hayashi Nagayoshi (林長由, c.1560–?), son of Hayashi Narinaga, who served Mōri Motonari. He also served Takakage's adopted sons. Jirōuemon (郎右エ門), Tamba-no-kami (丹波守).
- Saionji Kinmochi (西園寺公広, 1537–1588), possibly assassinated by Toyotomi Hideyoshi.
- Kono Michinao (河野通直, 1564–1587), possibly assassinated by Toyotomi Hideyoshi. Iyo-no-kami (伊予守).
- Murakami Kagechika (村上景親, 1558–1610)
- Murakami Kagehiro (村上景広, 1554–1627)
- Awaya Kagekatsu (粟屋景雄, ?–?)
- Ikuchi Kagemori (生口景守, ?–?)
- Isokane Kagemichi (磯兼景道, ?–?)
- Oka Kagetada (岡景忠, ?–1630)
- Katsura Kagenobu (桂景信, ?–?)
- Kanehisa Kagekatsu (包久景勝, ?–?)
- Kunishige Kageuji (國貞景氏, ?–?)
- Shimizu Kageharu (清水景治, 1571–1649)
- Mokake Kagetoshi (裳懸景利, ?–?)
- Masuda Kageyoshi (益田景祥, 1577–1630)
- Teshima Kageshige (手嶋景繁, ?–?)
- Shirai Kagetane (白井景胤, ?–?)
- Jinzai Kagemichi (神西景通, ?–?)

== Popular culture ==
- Portrayed by Toshiaki Megumi in the 1997 NHK Taiga drama TV series Mōri Motonari.
- He also appeared in Gunshi Kanbei as virtually head of the Mōri clan.
- He appears as a playable character in the video game series Samurai Warriors and its crossover game Warriors Orochi.

== See also ==
Media related to Kobayakawa Takakage at Wikimedia Commons

- Kobayakawa Hideaki
- Mōri Motonari
- Mōri Terumoto
- Kikkawa Motoharu
- Mihara Castle
- Mihara Domain
- Hayashi Narinaga
