= Kobayakawa clan =

Japanese samurai clan that was powerful during the Sengoku period

Kobayakawa clan 小早川氏
- Kobayakawa clan mon
- Home province: Aki; Bingo; Chikuzen; Iyo
- Parent house: Taira clan (平氏); Nakamura clan (中村氏); Dohi clan (土肥氏)
- Founder: Kobayakawa Tohira (Dohi Tohira)
- Founding year: 12th century
- Cadet branches: Mukunashi clan Kusai clan Nashiwa clan Koizumi clan Onashi clan Nomi clan Ura clan Kanehisa clan Ikuchi clan

The Kobayakawa clan (小早川氏, Kobayakawa-shi) was a Japanese samurai clan that claimed descent from the Taira clan. Their holdings were in the Chūgoku region. They were a powerful clan during the Sengoku period but were disbanded during the Edo period after the Battle of Sekigahara. However, the Kobayakawa clan was restored by the Mōri clan during the Meiji period and granted a title of baronage in the new nobility. In addition, the Kusai clan of Takehara which is a branch of the Kobayakawa were granted a rank of nobility.

== Origins ==
The Kobayakawa clan descend from the Kanmu-Heishi branch of the Taira clan (平氏) who are descendants of the 50th Emperor of Japan, Emperor Kanmu. The son of Taira no Tsunemune (平常宗), Nakamura Munehira (中村宗平) founded the Nakamura clan (中村氏) of Sagami Province. His first son became the next head of the Nakamura while his second son, Dohi Sanehira (土肥実平), founded the Dohi clan (土肥氏). Once again Sanehira's first son continued the Dohi clan while his second son, Kobayakawa Tohira (小早川遠平), founded the Kobayakawa clan.

Kanmu-tennō (桓武天皇, 737–806)
 　┃
Kazurawara-shinnō (葛原親王, 786–853)
 　┃
Takami-Ō (高見王, ?–?)
 　┃
Taira no Takamochi (平高望, ?–?)
 　┃
Taira no Yoshifumi (平良文, ?–?)
 　┃
Taira no Tadayori (平忠頼, 930–1019)
 　┃
Taira no Raison (平頼尊, ?–?)
 　┃
Taira no Tsuneto (平常遠, ?–?)
 　┃
Taira no Tsunemune (平常宗, ?–?)
 　┃
Nakamura Munehira (中村宗平, ?–?)
 　┃
Dohi Sanehira (土肥実平, ?–1191)
 　┃
Kobayakawa Tohira (小早川遠平, ?–1237)
 　┃
Kobayakawa Kagehira (小早川景平, ?–1244)

== History ==
Two sons of the third head of the family, Kobayakawa Shigehira (小早川茂平), split the clan into two branches. His third son, Kobayakawa Masahira (小早川雅平), made his base in Numata and became first head of the Numata-Kobayakawa clan (沼田小早川氏). His fourth son, Kobayakawa Masakage (小早川政景), made his base in Takehara and became first head of the Takehara-Kobayakawa clan (竹原小早川氏).

Members of the Kobayakawa clan served under the Mōri clan, and Toyotomi Hideyoshi. They held great power in administrating politics in Western Japan because the head of the family, Kobayakawa Takakage (小早川隆景) was in fact Mōri Terumoto's uncle and was recognized as one of the best statesmen by Toyotomi Hideyoshi who appointed Kobayakawa Takakage as a member of the Council of Five Elders but he died before Toyotomi Hideyoshi. They were also close allies with the Kikkawa clan which was run by Takakage's brother. The Kobayakawa fought alongside the Kikkawa, Mōri, Toyotomi, and Ōtomo clans against the Shimazu, for control of Kyūshū at the end of the 16th century; they were awarded Chikuzen Province as their fief following the Shimazu's defeat.

== Family Heads ==
- Kobayakawa Tohira (小早川遠平, ?–1237), founder of the clan.
- Kobayakawa Kagehira (小早川景平, ?–1244)
- Kobayakawa Shigehira (小早川茂平, ?–1264) - his two sons Masahira and Masakage made two branches of the clan.

Numata-Kobayakawa clan (沼田小早川氏):

1. Kobayakawa Masahira (小早川雅平, ?–?) - 3rd son of Shigehira.
2. Kobayakawa Tomohira (小早川朝平, ?–1348)
3. Kobayakawa Nobuhira (小早川宣平, ?–?)
4. Kobayakawa Sadahira (小早川貞平, ?–1375)
5. Kobayakawa Haruhira (小早川春平, ?–1402)
6. Kobayakawa Norihira (小早川則平, ?–?)
7. Kobayakawa Hirohira (小早川煕平, 1416–1473)
8. Kobayakawa Takahira (小早川敬平, 1452–1499)
9. Kobayakawa Sukehira (小早川扶平, 1485–1508)
10. Kobayakawa Okihira (小早川興平, 1505–1527
11. Kobayakawa Masahira (小早川正平, 1523–1543)
12. Kobayakawa Shigehira (小早川繁平, 1542–1574)
13. Kobayakawa Takakage (小早川隆景, 1533–1597) - 3rd son of Mōri Motonari.
14. Kobayakawa Hideaki (小早川秀秋, 1582–1602) - nephew of Toyotomi Hideyoshi.

Takehara-Kobayakawa clan (竹原小早川氏):

1. Kobayakawa Masakage (小早川政景, ?–?) - 4th son of Shigehira.
2. Kobayakawa Kagemune (小早川景宗, ?–?)
3. Kobayakawa Sukekage (小早川祐景, ?–1338)
4. Kobayakawa Shigekage (小早川重景, ?–?)
5. Kobayakawa Shigemune (小早川重宗, ?–?)
6. Kobayakawa Saneyoshi (小早川実義, ?–1364)
7. Kobayakawa Yoshiharu (小早川義春, ?–?)
8. Kobayakawa Nakayoshi (小早川仲義, ?–?)
9. Kobayakawa Hirokage (小早川弘景, ?–?)
10. Kobayakawa Morikage (小早川盛景, ?–?)
11. Kobayakawa Hirokage (小早川弘景, ?–?)
12. Kobayakawa Hirohira (小早川弘平, ?–?)
13. Kobayakawa Okikage (小早川興景, 1519–1541)
14. Kobayakawa Takakage (小早川隆景, 1533–1597) - 3rd son of Mōri Motonari.

== Significant Members ==
- Kobayakawa Takakage (小早川隆景, 1533–1597)
- Kobayakawa Hideaki (小早川秀秋, 1582–1602)
- Kobayakawa Hidekane (小早川秀包, 1567–1601)
- Lady Toida (問田大方, d. 1619)

== See also ==
- Mihara Castle
- Mihara Domain
- Mōri clan
- Taira clan
