= Kobayakawa Hidekane =

- 小早川 秀包
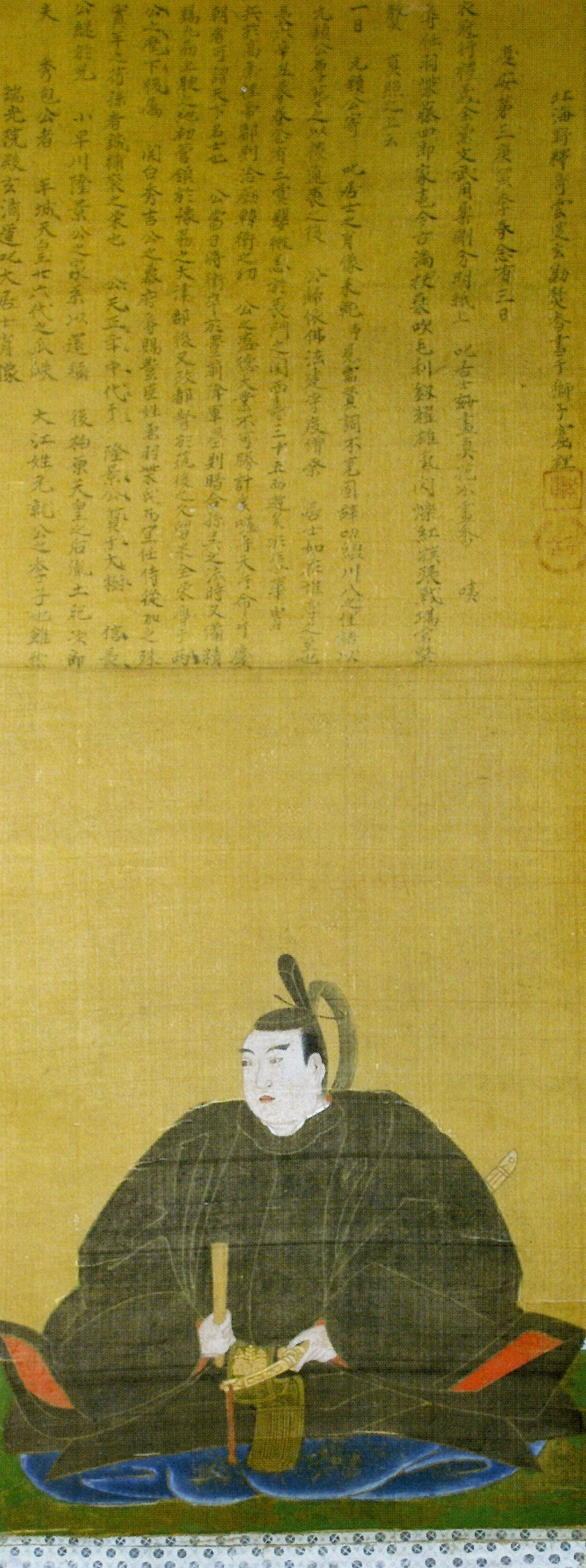
- Born: 1567; Aki, Japan
- Died: April 24, 1601 (aged 33 or 34); Nagato, Japan
- Relatives: Father: Mōri Motonari; Mother: Nomi no Ōkata
- Military career
- Allegiance: Mōri clan Toyotomi clan
- Rank: Daimyō (Lord); Chikugo no Kami (筑後守); Grand Chamberlain (侍従)
- Nicknames: Kinoshita Tatsunosuke (才菊丸); Ōda Mototsuna (大田元綱); Kobayakawa Motofusa (小早川元総); Mōri Hidekane (毛利秀兼)
- Unit: Mōri clan
- Commands: Chikugo province
- Conflicts: Korean campaign Siege of Ōtsu

Kobayakawa Hidekane (小早川 秀包; 1567 – April 24, 1601), later known as Mōri Hidekane (毛利 秀包), was a Japanese samurai, the ninth son of Mōri Motonari. His mother was Motonari's concubine, Nomi no Ōkata (乃美の方).

Originally he was named Mototsuna and given to Ōta Hidetsuna but later his childless half-brother Kobayakawa Takakage took him as his adopted son. After this he changed his name to Motofusa. When he became one of Toyotomi Hideyoshi's hostages for some years and granted to use a kanji from Hideyoshi's name, he changed his name again to Hidekane. He married Ōtomo Sōrin's daughter Maxentia (Katsurahime) and converted to Catholic Christianity with the baptized name Simao Findenao (シマオ・フィンデナオ).

After the Sekigahara Campaign, Hidekane changed his family name back to Mōri, to avoid shame caused by his stepbrother Kobayakawa Hideaki. He died young at 35 years old.

Hidekane was known of his gunnery skill, and Tachibana Muneshige's sworn brother. Together with him and other Toyotomi loyalists, Hidekane participated in Siege of Ōtsu Castle.
