= Kobayakawa Hideaki =

Fifth son of Kinoshita Iesada and the nephew of Toyotomi Hideyoshi (1577–1602)

- 小早川 秀秋
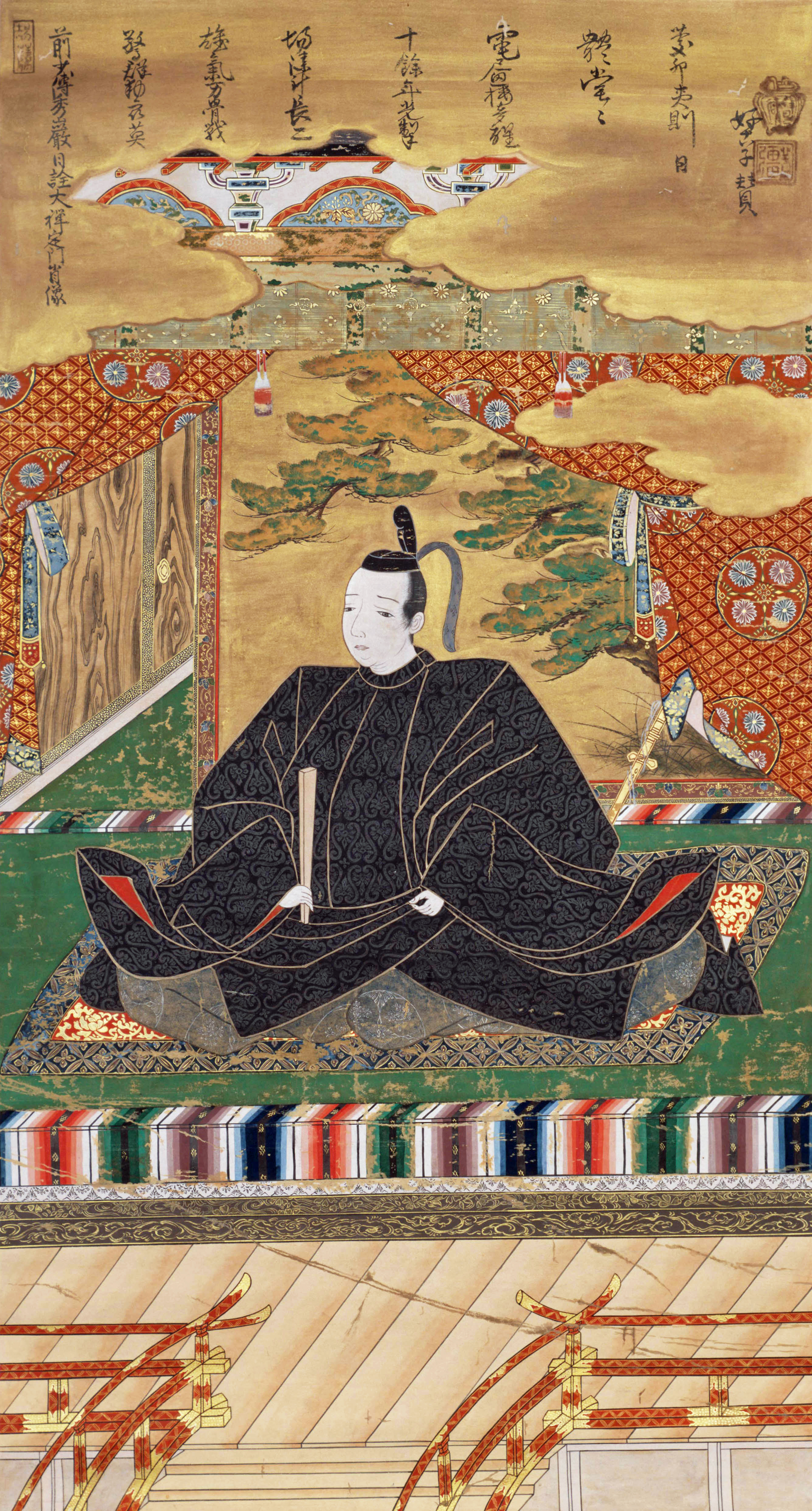

Head of Kobayakawa clan
- In office 1597–1602
- Preceded by: Kobayakawa Takakage
- Succeeded by: none

Personal details
- Born: 1577 Bitchū Province
- Died: January 12, 1602 (aged 24–25) Okayama Domain
- Spouse(s): Komahime, Shishido Motohide’s daughter
- Children: Hashiba Hideyuki
- Parents: Kinoshita Iesada (father); Sugihara Ietsugu's daughter (杉原家次娘) (mother)
- Relatives: Toyotomi Hideyoshi (foster father); Kobayakawa Takakage (foster father)
- Nickname(s): Kinoshita Tatsunosuke (木下辰之助); Kinoshita Hidetoshi (木下毛利秀俊); Hashiba Hidetoshi (羽柴秀俊); Kobayakawa Hidetoshi (小早川 秀俊); Hideaki (秀秋)

Military service
- Allegiance: Mōri clan Toyotomi clan Western Army; Eastern Army
- Rank: Daimyō (Lord); Saemon no Kami (左衛門督); Chūnagon
- Unit: Kobayakawa clan
- Commands: Chikugo domain
- Battles/wars: Korean Campaign (1598); Siege of Fushimi (1600); Battle of Sekigahara (1600); Siege of Sawayama (1600)

Kobayakawa Hideaki (小早川 秀秋; 1577 – December 1, 1602) was the fifth son of Kinoshita Iesada and a nephew of Toyotomi Hideyoshi. He was gained the rank of Saemon no Kami (左衛門督) or in China Shikkingo (執金吾) at genpuku and held the court title of Chūnagon (中納言), Hideaki was also called Kingo Chūnagon (金吾中納言).

== Biography ==
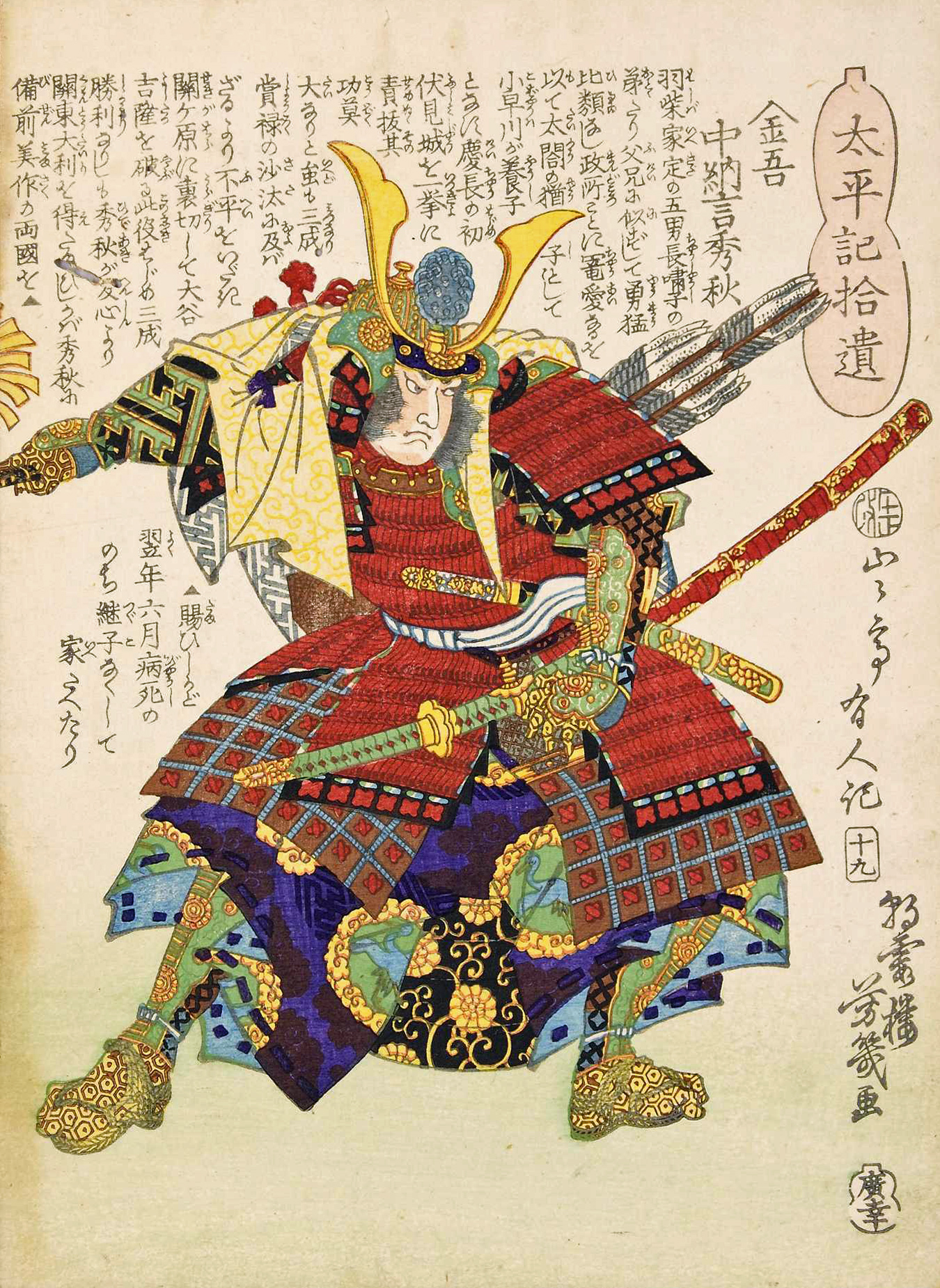
Ukiyo-e of Kobayakawa Hideaki

He was adopted by Hideyoshi and called himself Hashiba Hidetoshi (羽柴 秀俊). He was then again adopted by Kobayakawa Takakage, becoming Kobayakawa Hidetoshi (小早川 秀俊). He then renamed himself Hideaki (秀秋) after Takakage's death. Shortly after the Battle of Sekigahara, he renamed one last time to Kobayakawa Hideaki (小早川 秀詮).

During the Siege of Ulsan he led reinforcements to rescue Ulsan Castle from Joseon-Ming allied forces that were besieging the castle. Fighting on the front line with a spear, he managed to capture an enemy commander and broke the siege. However, Hideyoshi chastised him for making a dangerous and reckless charge (as he was overall commander, an adverse outcome could have had severe consequences) and deprived him of his domain Chikugo when he returned to Japan. Angered by this, Kobayakawa believed the rumor circulated by Tokugawa Ieyasu that this had been the doing of a jealous Ishida Mitsunari. He never forgot nor forgave Mitsunari and worked to undermine his position.

== Battle of Sekigahara ==
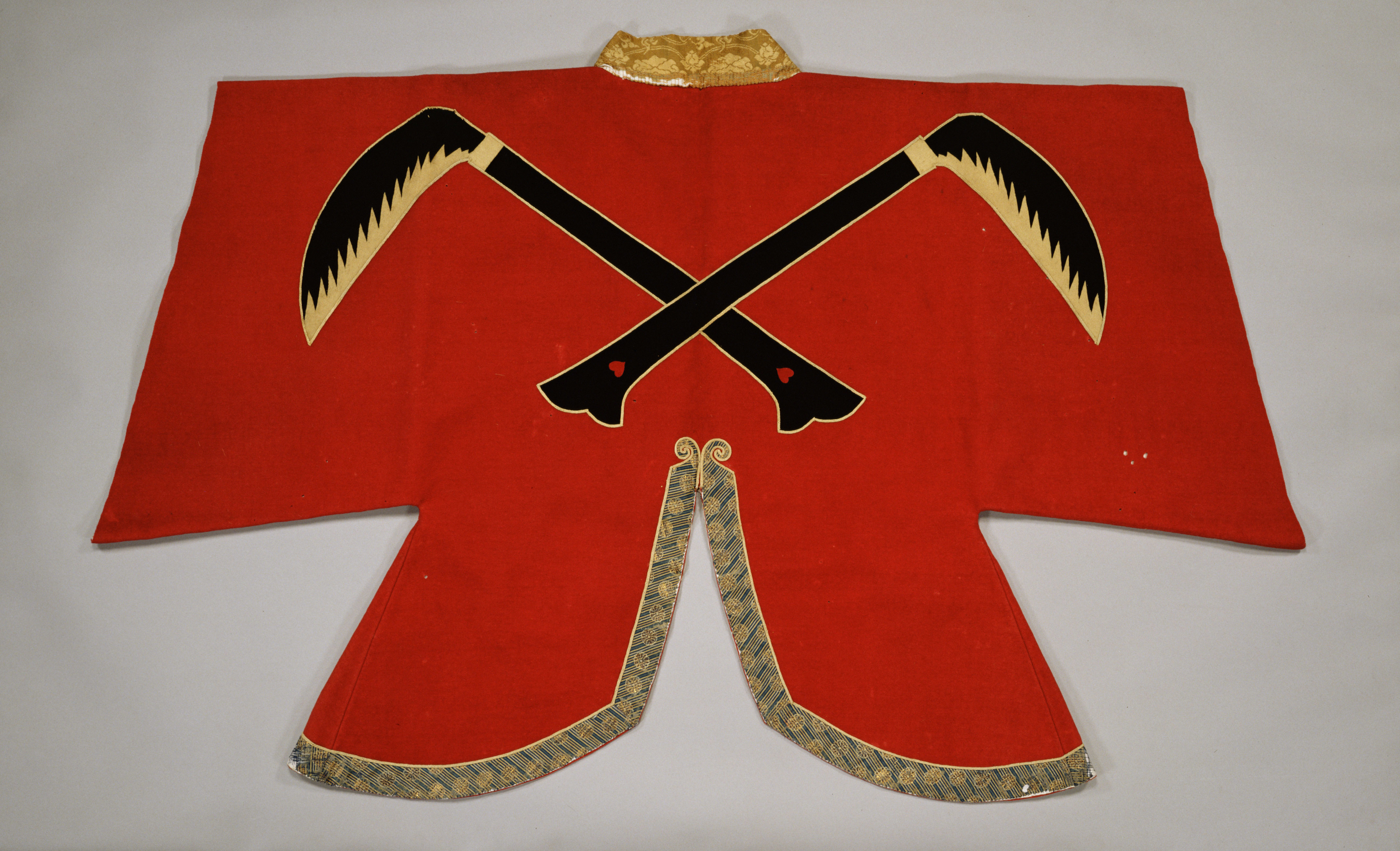
A scarlet silk battle robe with a sickle pattern, believed to have belonged to Kobayakawa Hideaki. Now preserved as Important Cultural Property, Tokyo National Museum.

Before the battle of Sekigahara, Kobayakawa happened to be in Osaka and gave aid to Mitsunari in the Siege of Fushimi. He acted as though he would go along with Mitsunari, even though he intended to betray him, having secretly communicated with Ieyasu. Knowing Kobayakawa held ill feelings, Mitsunari and Ōtani Yoshitsugu promised him two additional domains around Osaka and the position of kampaku (until Toyotomi Hideyori grew old enough to rule) if he helped them to victory.

Even after the battle began, Kobayakawa kept his intentions hidden. Ieyasu's force (east) was not faring well against Mitsunari's force (west); Ukita Hideie was winning against Fukushima Masanori and Ōtani Yoshitsugu was also winning against Tōdō Takatora. Kobayakawa was hesitant to participate with either side. According to some later historial accounts of the battle, Ieyasu ordered troops to fire blanks against the Kobayakawa troops to force them into action. Kobayakawa then ordered an attack on the Otani troops, and while this attack was beaten back temporarily, his action forced the other armies who had pledged betrayal to also turn. However, more recently, some historians have argued that "the earliest accounts of Sekigahara show that Hideaki's so-called treachery happened when the battle began, not halfway through", and that the "story about Ieyasu ordering ‘probing shots’ to be fired into his ranks is therefore a complete myth."

Historian Junji Mitsunari viewed the defection of Hideaki during the battle was not solely his decision, but it is also a collective intention of the entire Kobayakawa clan, as his vassals also urged Hideaki to change side to the Eastern Army.

Kobayakawa also experienced success in the mopping up operations that followed, defeating Mitsunari's father, Ishida Masatsugu in the Siege of Sawayama.

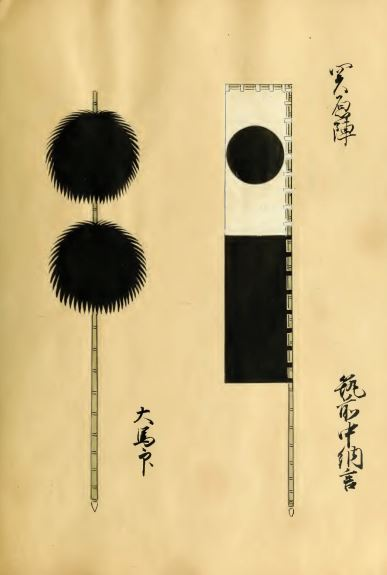
Kobayakawa Hideaki Battle standard

== Death ==
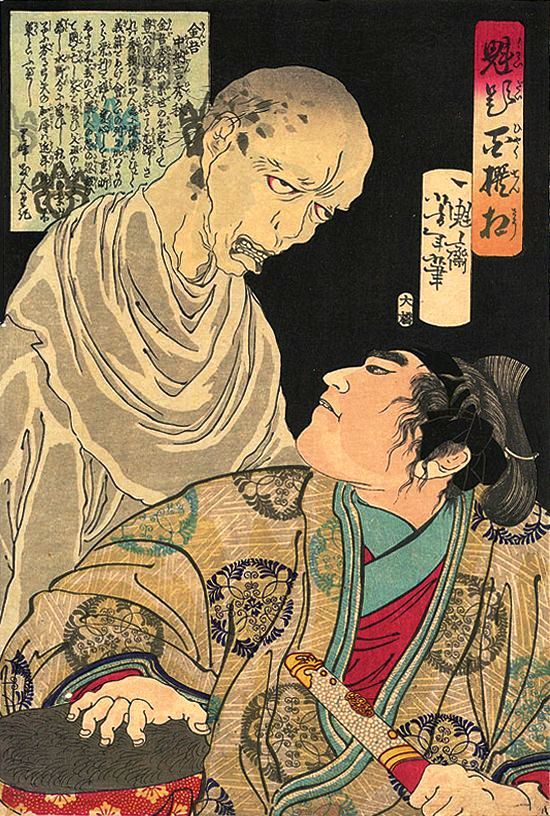
Kobayakawa Hideaki is scared of Ōtani Yoshitsugu's ghost. Ukiyo-e by Tsukioka Yoshitoshi (1868)

After Sekigahara, Kobayakawa was given the defeated Ukita clan's former fiefdoms of Bizen and Mimasaka, for a total of 550,000 koku. However, Kobayakawa drank himself to death two years later after supposedly losing his sanity, and with no one to succeed him, the Kobayakawa clan disbanded, and his fiefdoms were absorbed by the neighboring Ikeda clan.
