= Tomohide =

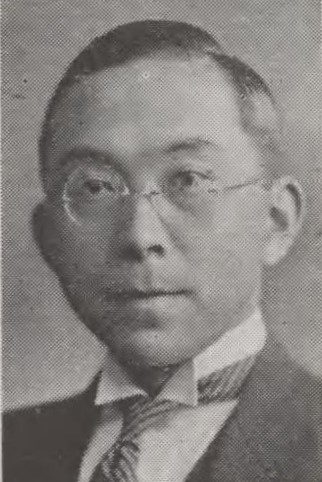
- Tomohide Iwakura (1904-1978), English-language scholar and politician
- Pronunciation: tomoçide (IPA)
- Gender: Male

Origin
- Origin: Japanese
- Meaning: Different meanings depending on the kanji used

Tomohide is a masculine Japanese given name.

== Written forms ==
Tomohide can be written using different combinations of kanji characters. Some examples:

- 友英, "friend, hero"
- 友秀, "friend, excellence"
- 友栄, "friend, prosperity"
- 友日出, "friend, sunrise"
- 知英, "know, hero"
- 知秀, "know, excellence"
- 知栄, "know, prosperity"
- 知日出, "know, sunrise"
- 智英, "intellect, hero"
- 智秀, "intellect, excellence"
- 智栄, "intellect, prosperity"
- 智日出, "intellect, sunrise"
- 共英, "together, hero"
- 共秀, "together, excellence"
- 朋英, "companion, hero"
- 朋秀, "companion, excellence"
- 朝英, "morning/dynasty, hero"
- 朝秀, "morning/dynasty, excellence"
- 朝栄, "morning/dynasty, prosperity"

The name can also be written in hiragana ともひで or katakana トモヒデ.

== Notable people with the name ==
- Tomohide Iwakura (岩倉 具栄; 1904–1978), English-language scholar and politician
- Tomohide Nakazawa (中澤 友秀; born 1980), Japanese footballer
- Tomohide Okuma (大熊 朝秀; 1517–1582), Japanese samurai
- Tomohide Utsumi (内海 知秀; born 1958), Japanese basketball coach
