= Furumiya Castle =

Castle ruins in Shinshiro, Japan

Coordinates: 34°58′20.8″N 137°25′39.2″E

- 古宮城
- Shinshiro, Aichi Prefecture, Japan
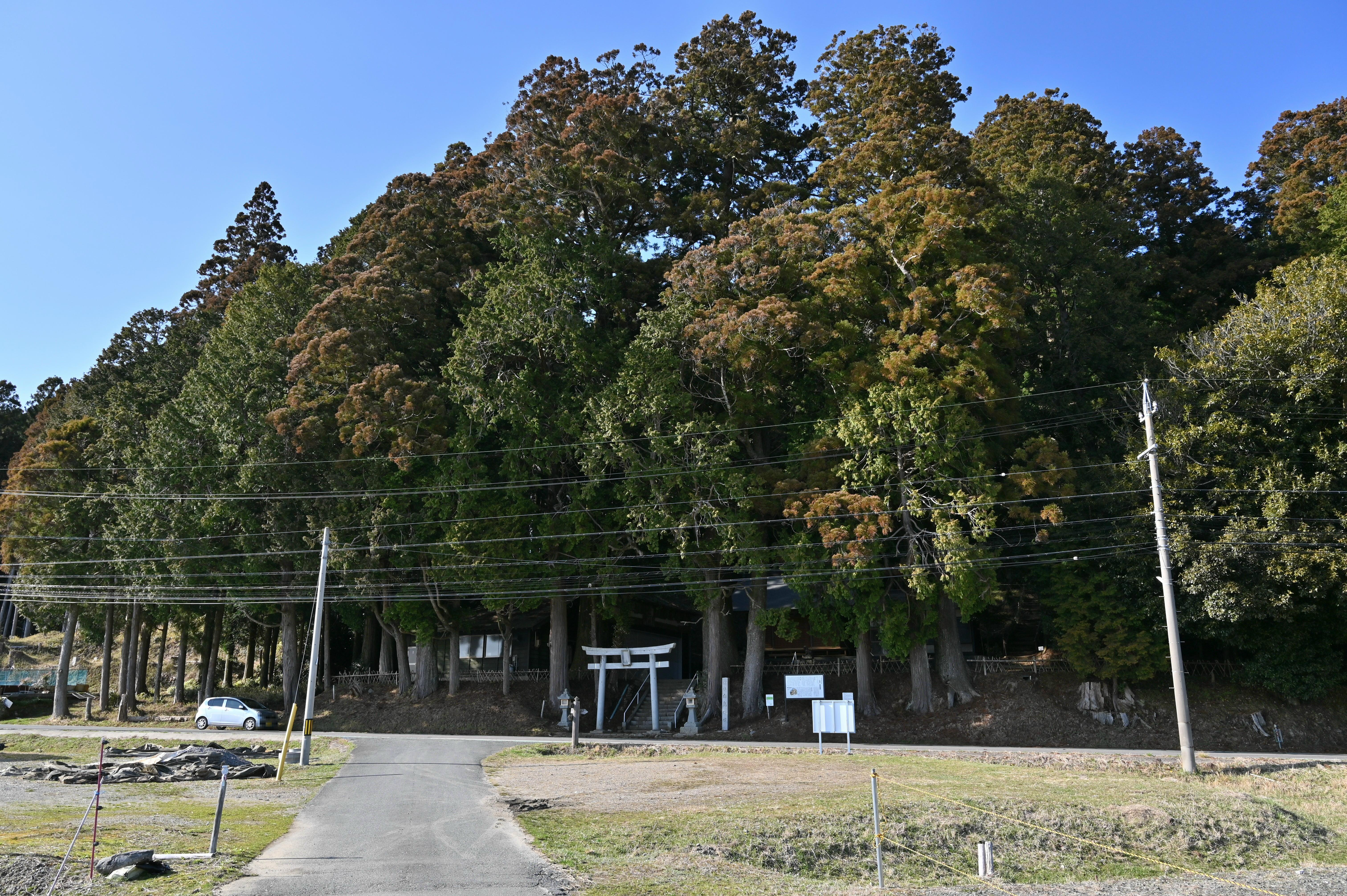

Site information
- Type: Hirayama-style castle
- Owner: Takeda clan
- Condition: ruins

Location
- Location within Aichi Prefecture Location within Japan

Site history
- Built: 1571?
- Built by: Baba Nobuharu
- Demolished: 1582?

Garrison information
- Past commanders: Ōkuma Tomohide?, Obata Masamori?

Furumiya Castle (古宮城, Furumiya-jō) is a castle structure in Shinshiro, Aichi Prefecture, Japan. The castle was built by Takeda Shingen's general Baba Nobuharu

The castle is now only ruins, some moats and earthworks. The castle was listed as one of the Continued Top 100 Japanese Castles in 2017.
