= Continued 100 Fine Castles of Japan =

List of castles chosen in 2017

The Continued 100 Fine Castles of Japan or Continued Top 100 Japanese Castles (日本続百名城, Nihon Zoku Hyaku-Meijō) is a list of 100 castles, intended as a sequel of 100 Fine Castles of Japan. The castles were chosen for their significance in culture, history, and in their regions by the Japanese Castle Foundation (日本城郭協会, Nihon Jōkaku Kyōkai) in 2017.

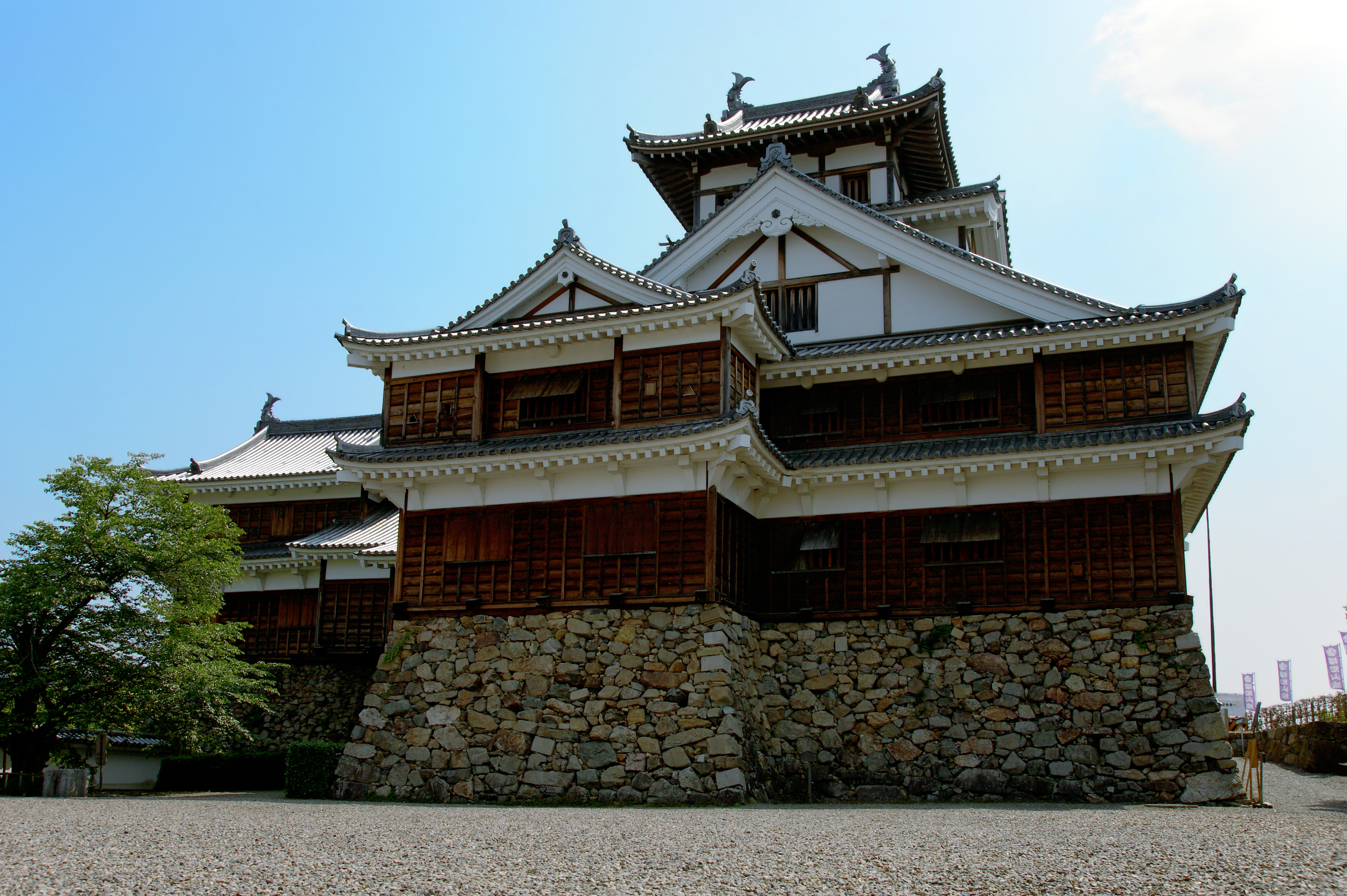
Reconstructed Tenshu(Keep) of Fukuchiyama Castle

== Hokkaidō region ==
Name	Prefecture	City	Year completed	Prominent Castle Lord	Photo
Shinori Date 志苔館	Hokkaido	Hakodate	?		
Katsuyama Date 勝山館	Hokkaido	Kaminokuni	1473	Takeda Nobuhiro	

== Tōhoku region ==
Name	Prefecture	City	Year completed	Prominent Castle Lord	Photo
Namioka Castle 浪岡城	Aomori	Aomori	15C		
Kunohe Castle 九戸城	Iwate	Ninohe	15C	Kunohe Masazane	
Shiroishi Castle 白石城	Miyagi	Shiroishi	12C	Amakasu Kagetsugu / Katakura Kagetsuna	
Wakimoto Castle 脇本城	Akita	Oga	15C	Andō Chikasue	
Akita Castle 秋田城	Akita	Akita	733	Abeno Yakamaro	
Tsurugaoka Castle 鶴ヶ岡城	Yamagata	Tsuruoka	12C		
Yonezawa Castle 米沢城	Yamagata	Yonezawa	12C	Date Terumune / Date Masamune / Uesugi Kagekatsu / Naoe Kanetsugu	
Miharu Castle 三春城	Fukushima	Tamura	16C?	Tamura Kiyoaki	
Mukaihaguroyama Castle 向羽黒山城	Fukushima	Aizumisato	1568	Ashina Moriuji	

== Kantō region ==
Name	Prefecture	City	Year completed	Prominent Castle Lord	Photo
Kasama Castle 笠間城	Ibaraki	Kasama	1219	Matsudaira Yasushige	
Tsuchiura Castle 土浦城	Ibaraki	Tsuchiura	15C	Oda Ujiharu	
Karasawa Castle 唐沢山城	Tochigi	Sano	10C	Fujiwara Hidesato	
Nagurumi Castle 名胡桃城	Gunma	Minakami	16C	Suzuki Norishige	
Numata Castle 沼田城	Gunma	Numata	1532	Sanada Nobuyuki	
Iwabitsu Castle 岩櫃城	Gunma	Higashiagatsuma	1552	Sanada Yukitaka, Sanada Masayuki	
Oshi Castle 忍城	Saitama	Gyōda	1479	Narita Yasusue	
Sugiyama Castle 杉山城	Saitama	Ranzan	?		
Sugaya Yakata 菅谷館	Saitama	Ranzan	?	Hatakeyama Shigetada	
Moto Sakura Castle 本佐倉城	Chiba	Shisui	?	Matsudaira Tadateru, Doi Toshikatsu	
Ōtaki Castle 大多喜城	Chiba	Ōtaki	?	Honda Tadakatsu	
Takiyama Castle 滝山城	Tokyo	Hachiōji	1521	Hōjō Ujiteru	
Shinagawa Daiba 品川台場	Tokyo	Minato-ku	1853		
Kozukue Castle 小机城	Kanagawa	Kōhoku-ku	14C	Ujimitsu Hōjō	
Ishigakiyama Castle 石垣山城	Kanagawa	Odawara	1592	Toyotomi Hideyoshi	

== Kōshin'etsu region ==
Name	Prefecture	City	Year completed	Prominent Castle Lord	Photo
Shinpu Castle 新府城	Yamanashi	Nirasaki	1582	Takeda Katsuyori	
Yōgaiyama Castle 要害山城	Yamanashi	Kōfu	1520	Takeda Nobutora / Takeda Shingen	
Tatsuoka Castle 龍岡城	Nagano	Saku	1864-67		
Takashima Castle 高島城	Nagano	Suwa	1592	Suwa Yoritada	
Murakami Castle 村上城	Niigata	Murakami	16C	Honjō Shigenaga	
Takada Castle 高田城	Niigata	Jōetsu	1614	Matsudaira Tadateru	
Samegao Castle 鮫ヶ尾城	Niigata	Myōkō	16C	Horie Munechika	

== Hokuriku region ==
Name	Prefecture	City	Year completed	Prominent Castle Lord	Photo
Toyama Castle 富山城	Toyama	Toyama (city)	1543	Jinbō Nagamoto / Sassa Narimasa	
Masuyama Castle 増山城	Toyama	Tonami	14C	Jinbō Nagamoto / Sassa Narimasa	
Torigoe Castle 鳥越城	Ishikawa	Hakusan	1573	Sengoku Hidehisa	
Fukui Castle 福井城	Fukui	Fukui (city)	1573/1606	Shibata Katsuie / Yūki Hideyasu	
Echizen Ōno Castle 越前大野城	Fukui	Ōno	1580	Kanamori Nagachika	
Kuniyoshi Castle 国吉城	Fukui	Mihama	1556	Kimura Shigekore	
Genbao Castle 玄蕃尾城	Fukui / Shiga		1582?	Shibata Katsuie	

== Tōkai region ==
Name	Prefecture	City	Year completed	Prominent Castle Lord	Photo
Gujō Hachiman Castle 郡上八幡城	Gifu	Gujō	1559	Inaba Sadamichi	
Naegi Castle 苗木城	Gifu	Nakatsugawa	14C	Tōyama Tomomasa	
Kaneyama Castle 金山城	Gifu	Kani	1537	Mori Yoshinari	
Ōgaki Castle 大垣城	Gifu	Ōgaki	1500	Ujiie Naotomo	
Kōkokuji Castle 興国寺城	Shizuoka	Numazu	14C	Hōjō Sōun?	
Suwahara Castle 諏訪原城	Shizuoka	Shimada	1573	Imagawa Ujizane	
Takatenjin Castle 高天神城	Shizuoka	Kakegawa	16C	Okabe Motonobu	
Hamamatsu Castle 浜松城	Shizuoka	Hamamatsu	1504-20	Tokugawa Ieyasu	
Komakiyama Castle 小牧山城	Aichi	Komaki	14C	Oda Nobunaga	
Furumiya Castle 古宮城	Aichi	Shinshiro	1575?	Ōkuma Tomohide? / Obata Masamori?	
Yoshida Castle 吉田城	Aichi	Toyohashi	1505	Matsudaira Nagachika / Sakai Tadatsugu	
Tsu Castle 津城	Mie	Tsu	1558	Oda Nobukane	
Tage Kitabatakeshi Jōkan 北畠館	Mie	Tsu	?	Kitabatake Tomonori	
Tamaru Castle 田丸城	Mie	Tamaki	12C	Oda Nobukatsu	
Akagi Castle 赤木城	Mie	Kumano	1589	Todo Takatora	

== Kansai region ==
Name	Prefecture	City	Year completed	Prominent Castle Lord	Photo
Kamaha Castle 鎌刃城	Shiga	Maibara	135C	Hori Hidemura	
Hachimanyama Castle 八幡山城	Shiga	Ōmihachiman	1585	Toyotomi Hidetsugu	
Fukuchiyama Castle 福知山城	Kyoto Prefecture	Fukuchiyama	1579	Akechi Hidemitsu	
Akutagawayama Castle 芥川山城	Osaka Prefecture	Takatsuki	1515	Miyoshi Nagayoshi	
Iimoriyama Castle 飯盛山城	Osaka Prefecture	Shijōnawate	1333-1338	Miyoshi Nagayoshi	
Kishiwada Castle 岸和田城	Osaka Prefecture	Kishiwada	1394	Miyoshi Yoshikata	
Arikoyama Castle/ Izushi Castle 有子山城/ 出石城	Hyōgo	Toyooka	1574 / 1604	Yamana Suketoyo	
Kuroi Castle 黒井城	Hyōgo Prefecture	Tanba	14C	Akai Naomasa Saitō Toshimitsu	
Sumoto Castle 洲本城	Hyōgo Prefecture	Sumoto	14C	Atagi Fuyuyasu	
Kōriyama Castle 郡山城	Nara Prefecture	Yamatokōriyama	1162	Tsutsui Junkei Toyotomi Hidenaga	
Uda Matsuyama Castle 宇陀松山城	Nara Prefecture	Uda	15C	Fukushima Takaharu	
Shingū Castle 新宮城	Wakayama Prefecture	Shingū	1618	Mizuno Shigenaga	

== Chūgoku region ==
Name	Prefecture	City	Year completed	Prominent Castle Lord	Photo
Wakasa Oniga Castle 若桜鬼ヶ城	Tottori	Wakasa	13C	Yamanaka Yukimori	
Yonago Castle 米子城	Tottori	Yonago	15C	Kikkawa Hiroie	
Hamada Castle 浜田城	Shimane	Hamada	1620	Sengoku Hidehisa	
Bitchu Takamatsu Castle 高松城	Okayama	Okayama	16C	Shimizu Muneharu	
Mihara Castle 三原城	Hiroshima	Mihara	12C	Kobayakawa Takakage	
Niitakayama Castle 新高山城	Hiroshima	Mihara	1552	Kobayakawa Takakage	
Kōnomine Castle/ Ōuchi-shi Yakata 高嶺城/ 大内氏館	Yamaguchi	Yamaguchi (city)	1556 / 14C	Ōuchi Yoshinaga	

== Shikoku region ==
Name	Prefecture	City	Year completed	Prominent Castle Lord	Photo
Shōzui Castle 勝瑞城	Tokushima	Tokushima	12C	Miyoshi Yoshikata	
Ichinomiya Castle 一宮城	Tokushima	Tokushima	1338	Ogasawara Narisuke	
Hiketa Castle 引田城	Kagawa	Higashikagawa	Unknown	Sengoku Hidehisa	
Noshima Castle 能島城	Ehime	Imabari	14C	Murakami Takeyoshi	
Kagomori Castle 河後森城	Ehime	Kitauwa	12C		
Okō Castle 岡豊城	Kōchi	Nankoku	13-14C	Chōsokabe Motochika	

== Kyūshū region ==
Name	Prefecture	City	Year completed	Prominent Castle Lord	Photo
Kokura Castle 小倉城	Fukuoka Prefecture	Kitakyushu	1569	Hosokawa Tadaoki	
Mizuki Castle 水城	Fukuoka	Dazaifu	654		
Kurume Castle 久留米城	Fukuoka	Kurume	1504-1521	Kobayakawa Hidekane	
Kii Castle 基肄城	Saga Prefecture	Chikushino	665		
Karatsu Castle 唐津城	Saga	Karatsu	1608	Terazawa Hirotaka	
Kaneda Castle 金田城	Nagasaki	Tsushima Province	667		
Ishida Castle 石田城	Nagasaki	Gotō	1863	Gotō Morinori	
Hara Castle 原城	Nagasaki	Minamishimabara	1496	Amakusa Shirō	
Kikuchi Castle 鞠智城	Kumamoto	Kikuchi	after 663		
Yatsushiro Castle 八代城	Kumamoto	Yatsushiro	1622		
Nakatsu Castle 中津城	Ōita	Nakatsu	1588	Kuroda Kanbei / Hosokawa Tadaoki	
Tsunomure Castle 角牟礼城	Ōita	Yatsushiro	1277-88	Mori Takamasa	
Usuki Castle 臼杵城	Ōita	Usuki	1562	Ōtomo Sōrin	
Saiki Castle 佐伯城	Ōita	Saiki	1606	Mori Takamasa	
Nobeoka Castle 延岡城	Miyazaki	Nobeoka	1606	Takahashi Mototane	
Sadowara Castle 佐土原城	Miyazaki	Miyazaki	14C	Itō Yoshisuke / Shimazu Toyohisa	
Shibushi Castle 志布志城	Kagoshima	Shibushi	?	Niiro Korehisa	
Chiran Castle 知覧城	Kagoshima	Minamikyūshū	12C		

== Okinawa region ==
Name	Prefecture	City	Year completed	Prominent Lord	Photo
Zakimi Castle 座喜味城	Okinawa	Nakagami	1416-22	Gosamaru	
Katsuren Castle 勝連城	Okinawa	Uruma	14C	Amawari	

== See also ==
- List of castles in Japan
- List of National Treasures of Japan (castles)
