= Takada Castle =

Edo period flatland-style Japanese castle

- 高田城
- Jōetsu, Niigata, Japan
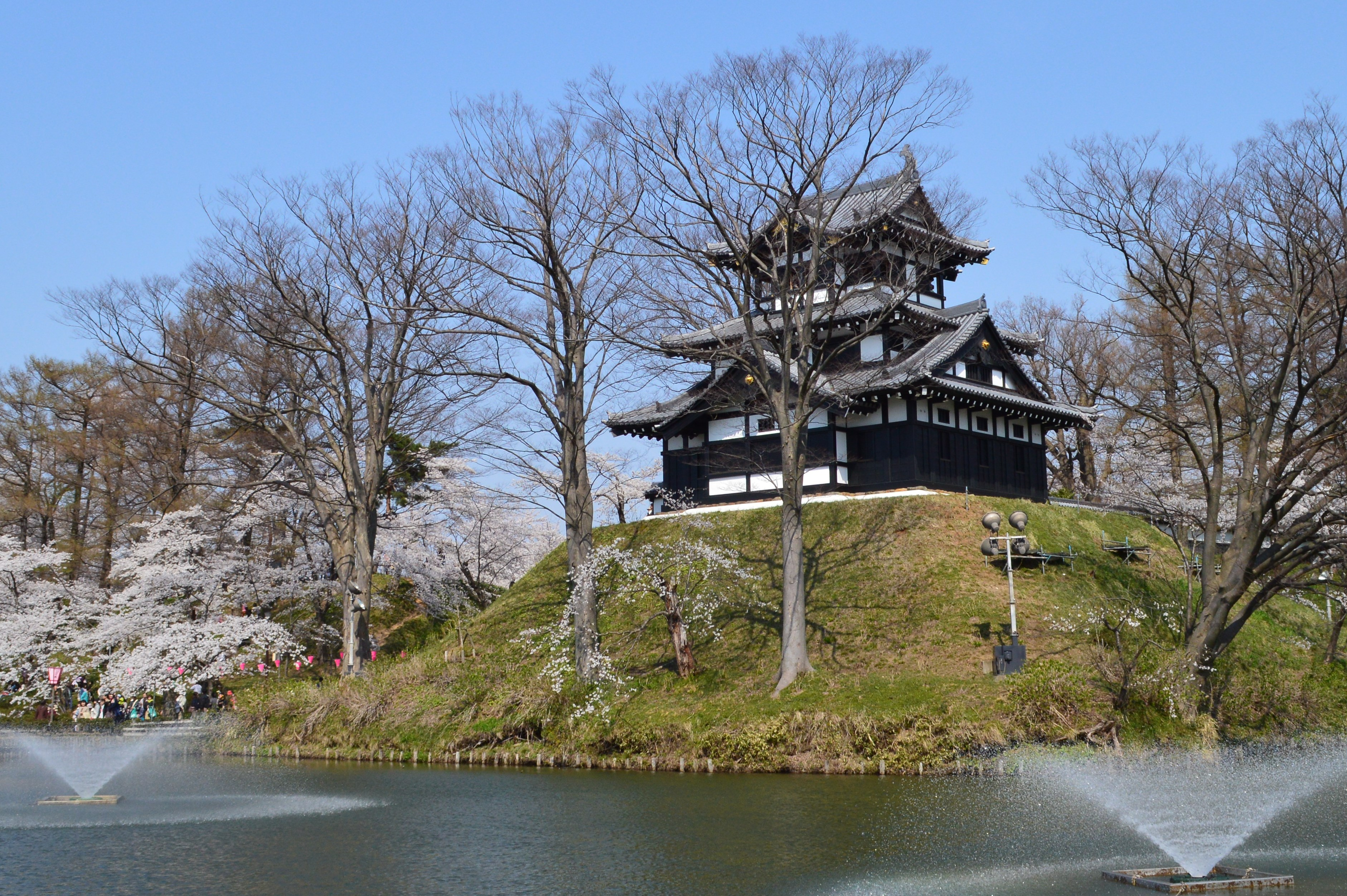
- Corner tower of Takada (Reconstructed)

Site information
- Type: Hirajiro (flatland castle)
- Condition: partially reconstructed

Location
- Coordinates: 37°6′36″N 138°15′21″E

Site history
- Built: 1614
- In use: 1614-1889

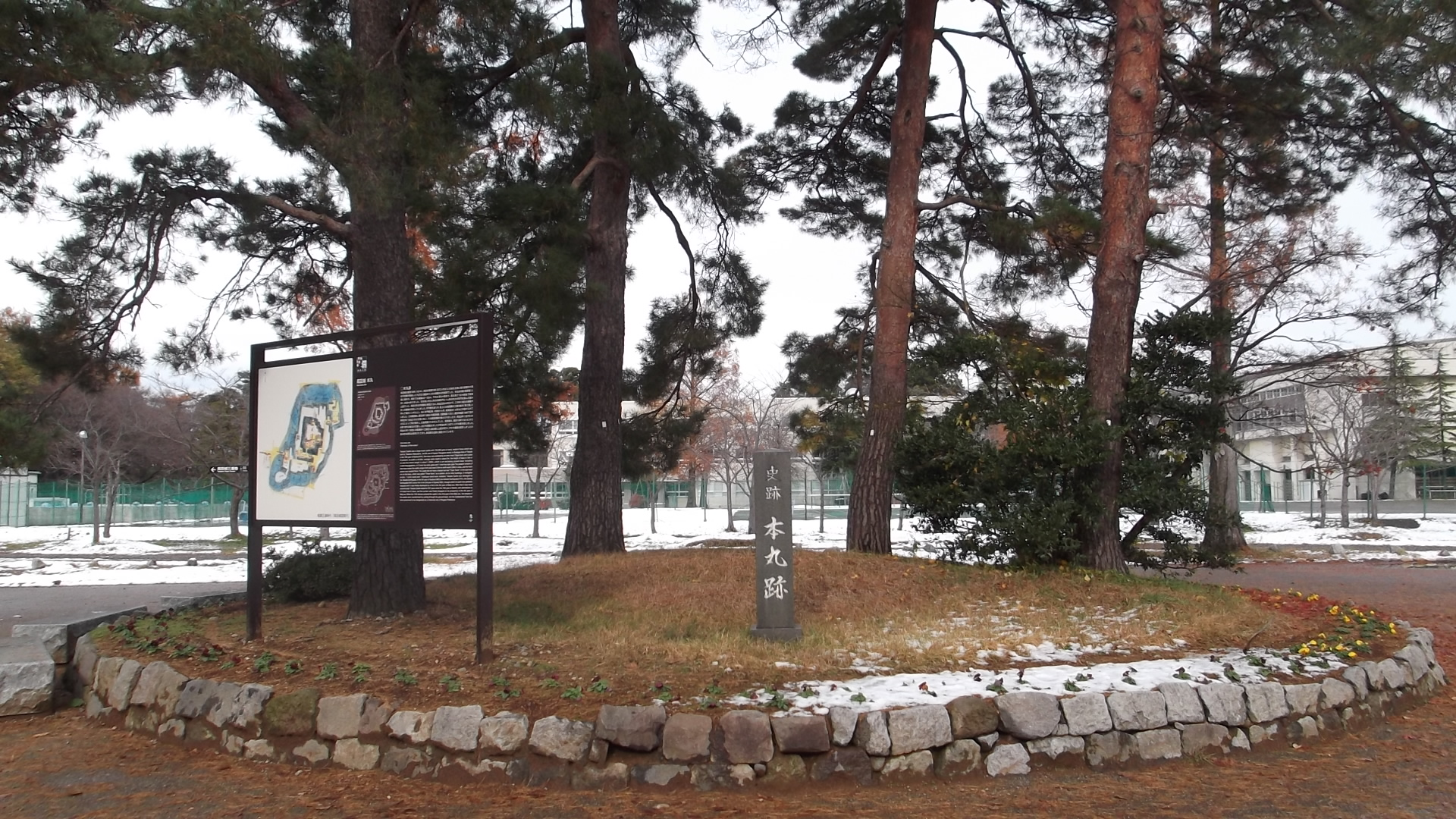
Front of the inner castle

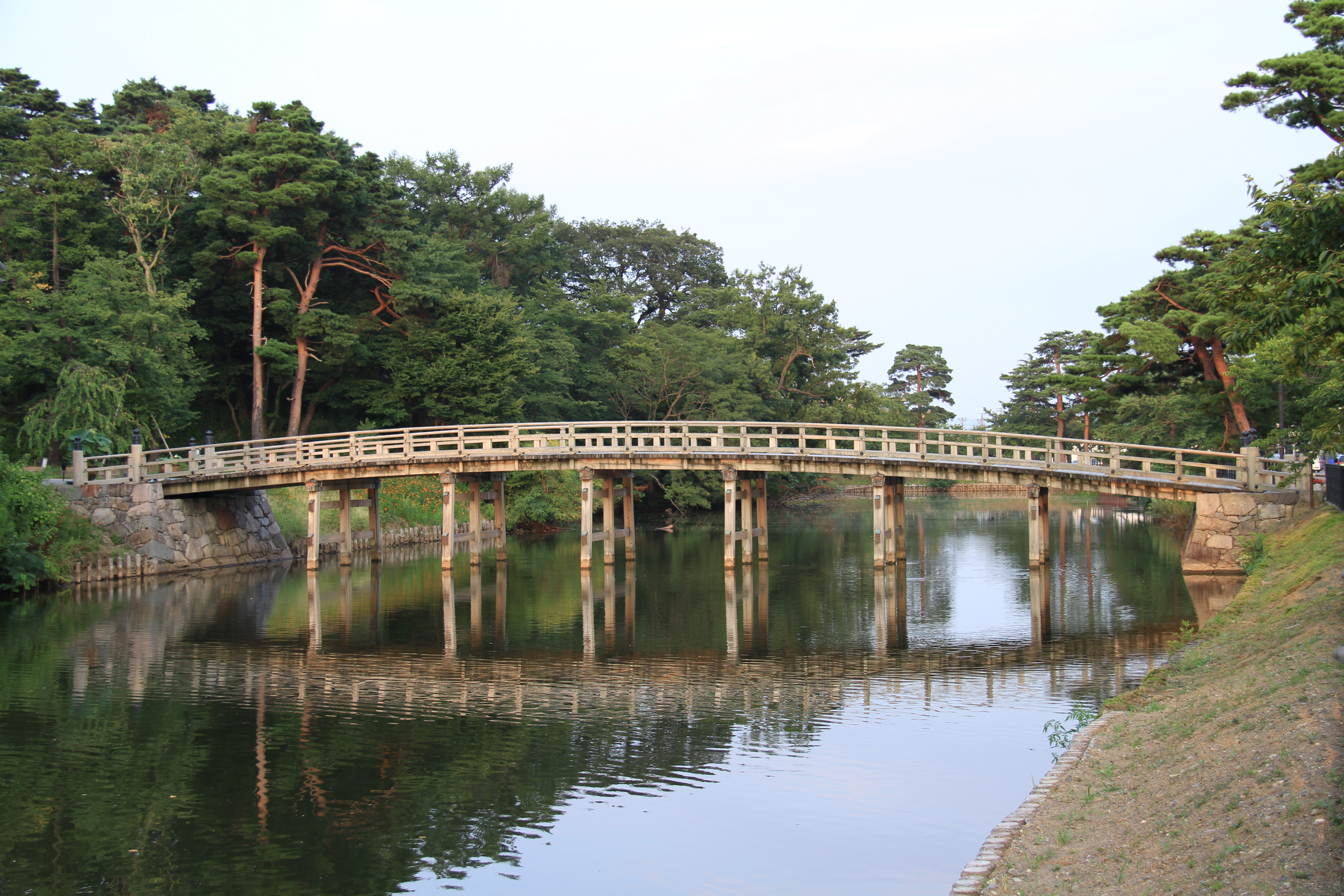
Gokuraku Bridge of the castle

Takada Castle (高田城, Takada-jō)) was an Edo period flatland-style Japanese castle located in what is now the center of the city of Jōetsu, Niigata Prefecture in the Hokuriku region of Honshu, Japan. Under the Tokugawa shogunate, it was the centre of Takada Domain.

== Background ==
Takada Castle is located at the juncture of the Seki River and Yashiro River, and utilises a small height surrounded by the curving rivers as part of its outer moat. The castle is also located so as to control bottleneck in the main route between the Sea of Japan and the Kantō region to the east. Since the 14th century, this area was ruled by a branch of the Nagao clan, who were senior retainers of the Uesugi under the Muromachi shogunate. The Nagao clan built nearby Kasugayama Castle, and in the middle of 16th century, Uesugi Kenshin (1530-1578) (formerly of the Nagao clan but who had succeeded to the chieftainship of the Uesugi clan) united Echigo Province under his rule. However, after his death, the clan was forced to submit to Toyotomi Hideyoshi and were transferred to Aizu. Hideyoshi appointed the Hori Hideharu (1575-1606) as lord of Echigo, and he relocated from Kasugayama to Fukushima Castle in the port of Naoetsu. The Hori clan was deprived of is holdings in 1610 by Tokugawa Ieyasu soon after the start of the Tokugawa shogunate, and the domain were given to Ieyasu's sixth son, Matsudaira Tadateru.

Matsudaira Tadateru was Ieyasu's son by a concubine, and had been sent away to be raised by retainers soon after his birth. He was appointed daimyō of Fukaya in Musashi in 1599, and was transferred to Sakura Domain in 1602, followed by Kawanakajima Domain in 1603. His appointment to Takada Domain came with a kokudaka of 750,000 koku, making the domain the second largest in Japan, and was intended to offset neighbouring Kanazawa Domain ruled by the tozama Maeda clan. Although Fukushima Castle was well-designed and was conveniently close to the port at Naoetsu, Tadateru found that it was too small for his forces, and was also subject to frequent flooding. In 1614, he decided to build a completely new castle at a more inland location.

During this time period, the relations between the Tokugawa shogunate and Toyotomi Hideyori and his supporters based in Osaka were rapidly approaching open war. Consequently, the shogunate could not afford either the time nor the money for a new castle at Takada. The shogunate ordered Date Masamune (who was also Tadateru's father-in-law) to organise the construction and 13 daimyō houses to contribute manpower and resources. These included Maeda Toshitsune from Kanazawa Domain, and even the former warlord of Echigo, Uesugi Kagekatsu, who was now at Yonezawa. Construction of the castle was begun on 15 March 1614 and was more or less completed only four months later. To save time and resources, only earthen ramparts were used, with no stone facing, and no tenshu was constructed.

== Structure ==
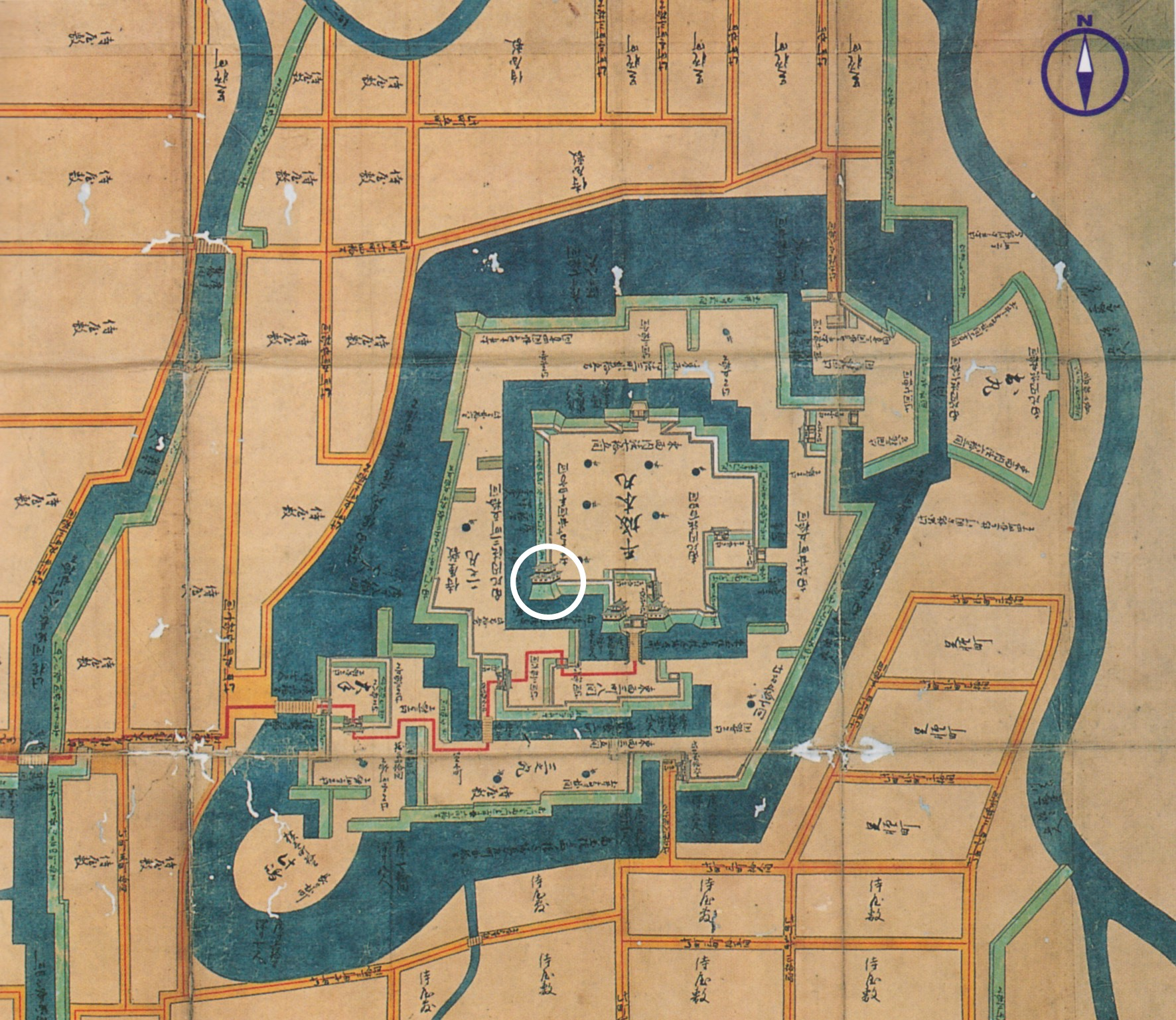
Plan of the castle (Corner tower in the white circle

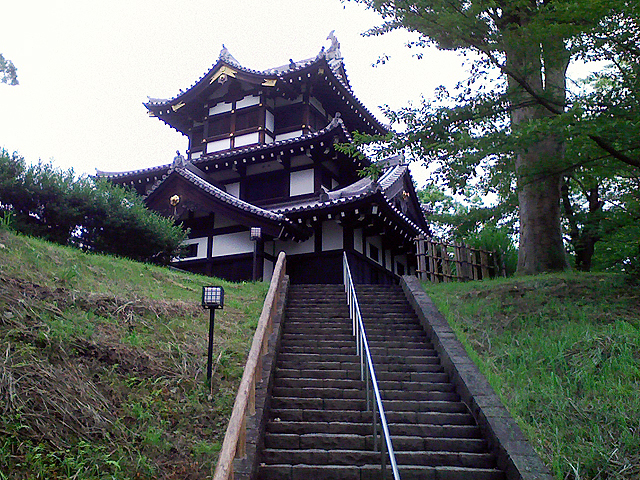
The corner tower from inside the castle

The completed castle measured 800 by 400 meters with a 220 x 230 meter inner bailey protected by moats and a clay wall. This bailey had two masugata-style gates and a three-story yagura in the southwestern corner, which served as its donjon. The inner bailey was surrounded by the second enclosure and there were smaller tertiary enclosures to the northeast and southwest, with a wide outer moat. Compared with its huge size, Takada Castle had a simple layout with only three yagura, and was mainly protected by just a combination of moats and clay wall.

== History ==
Tadateru did not have much time to enjoy his new castle. During the Siege of Osaka in 1615, Tadateru had a falling out with his elder brother Shōgun Tokugawa Hidetada, who regarded him as a potential rival Tadateru's position was also endangered by Tokugawa Ieyasu's lack of any familiar feelings for his sixth son, and by the fact that his more favoured younger brothers, Tokugawa Yoshinao, Tokugawa Yorinobu and Tokugawa Yorifusa had come of age and had been granted large domains. Tadateru was disposed in 1616 and was confined to Takashima Castle in Shinano Province until his death more than 50 years later.

Takada Domain was considerably reduced in kokudaka, and was assigned to a series of fudai daimyō, many of whom held the domain only for a short period and saw the position as only a stepping-stone to a better promotion. The domain came under the control of the Sakakibara clan in 1741, who ruled until the Meiji restoration.

Takada Castle was damaged by an earthquake in 1665 and again in 1751. In 1802, all of the castle burned down, except the gates and corner towers.

Although the castle did not suffer any damage during the Boshin War, the reconstructed daimyō palace and three-story yagura burned down in 1870. In 1872, per an edict by the Meiji government, the remaining castle structures were dismantled, and the moats were filled in, with the eastern half of the castle grounds sold off and used as a school grounds. The central part of the castle became the base for the Imperial Japanese Army's 13th Infantry Division. After World War II, the central and surviving western half of the castle grounds became Takeda Park, which was planted with over 4000 sakura trees. In the context of the 20th anniversary celebrations of the city of Jōetsu (1991) it was decided that the corner yagura should be rebuilt in its original form, using old plans, the surviving moats and earthen ramparts repaired, and a bridge connecting the inner bailey with the Ni-no-maru secondary bailey was also restored. The castle was listed as one of the Continued Top 100 Japanese Castles in 2017.

== See also ==
- List of Historic Sites of Japan (Niigata)

== Bibliography ==
- De Lange, William (2021). An Encyclopedia of Japanese Castles. Groningen: Toyo Press. pp. 600 pages. ISBN 978-9492722300.
- Ikeda Koichi, Takada-jo in: Miura Masayuki (Ed.), Shiro to jinya. Tokoku-hen. Gakken, 2006. ISBN 978-4-05-604378-5.
- Miyaji Saichiro (Ed.), Takada-jo in Bakumatsu shoshu saigo-no hanshu-tachi. Higashinihon-hen. Jinbunsha, 1997. ISBN 978-4-7959-1905-1.
- Niigata-ken no rekishi sampo henshu iinkai (Ed.): Niigata-ken no rekishi sampo. Yamakawa Shuppan, 2009. ISBN 978-4-634-24615-7.
