= Yonago Castle =

- 米子城
- Yonago, Tottori, Japan
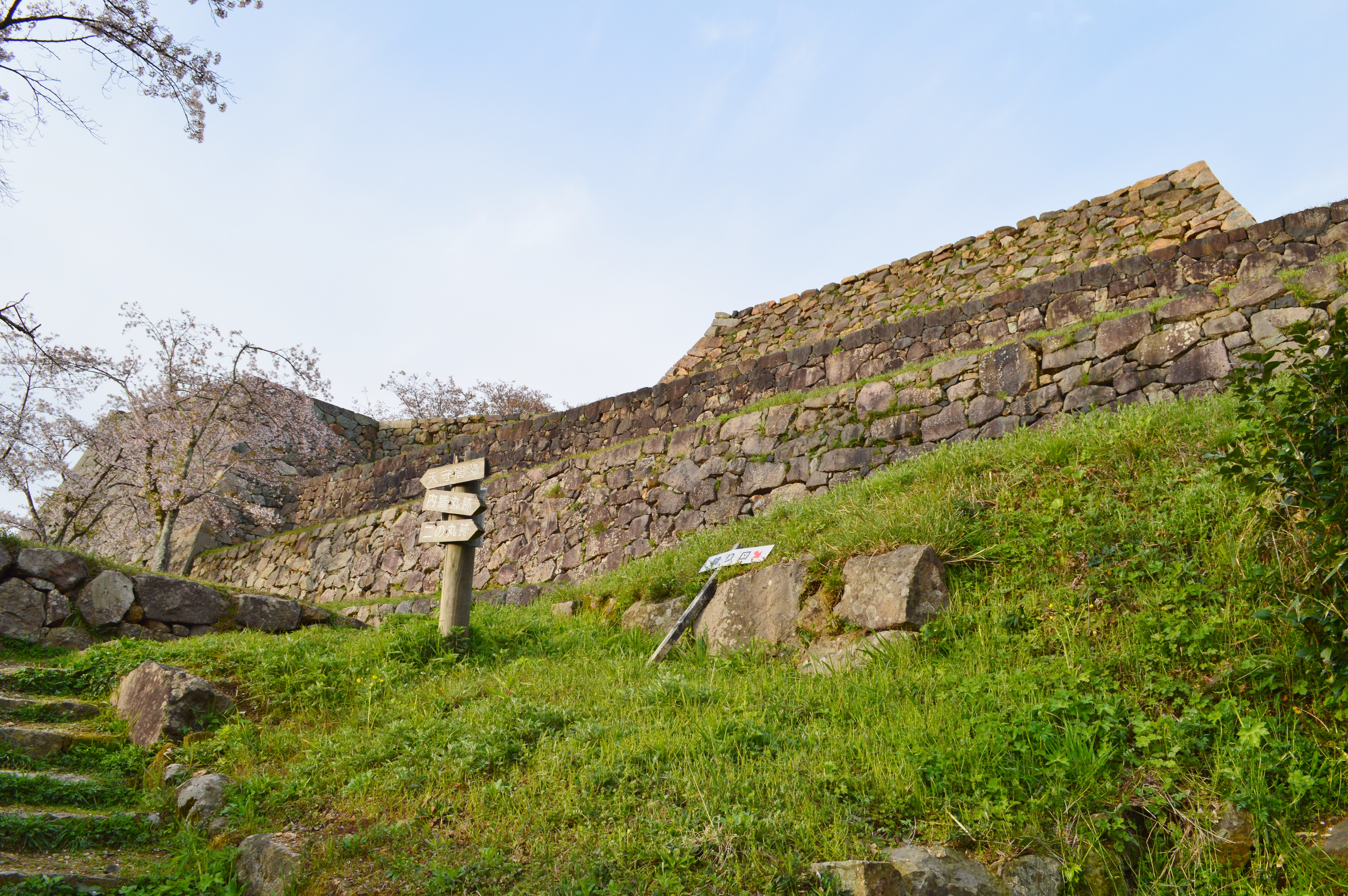
- Stone wall of Honmaru Base and Tenshu Tower

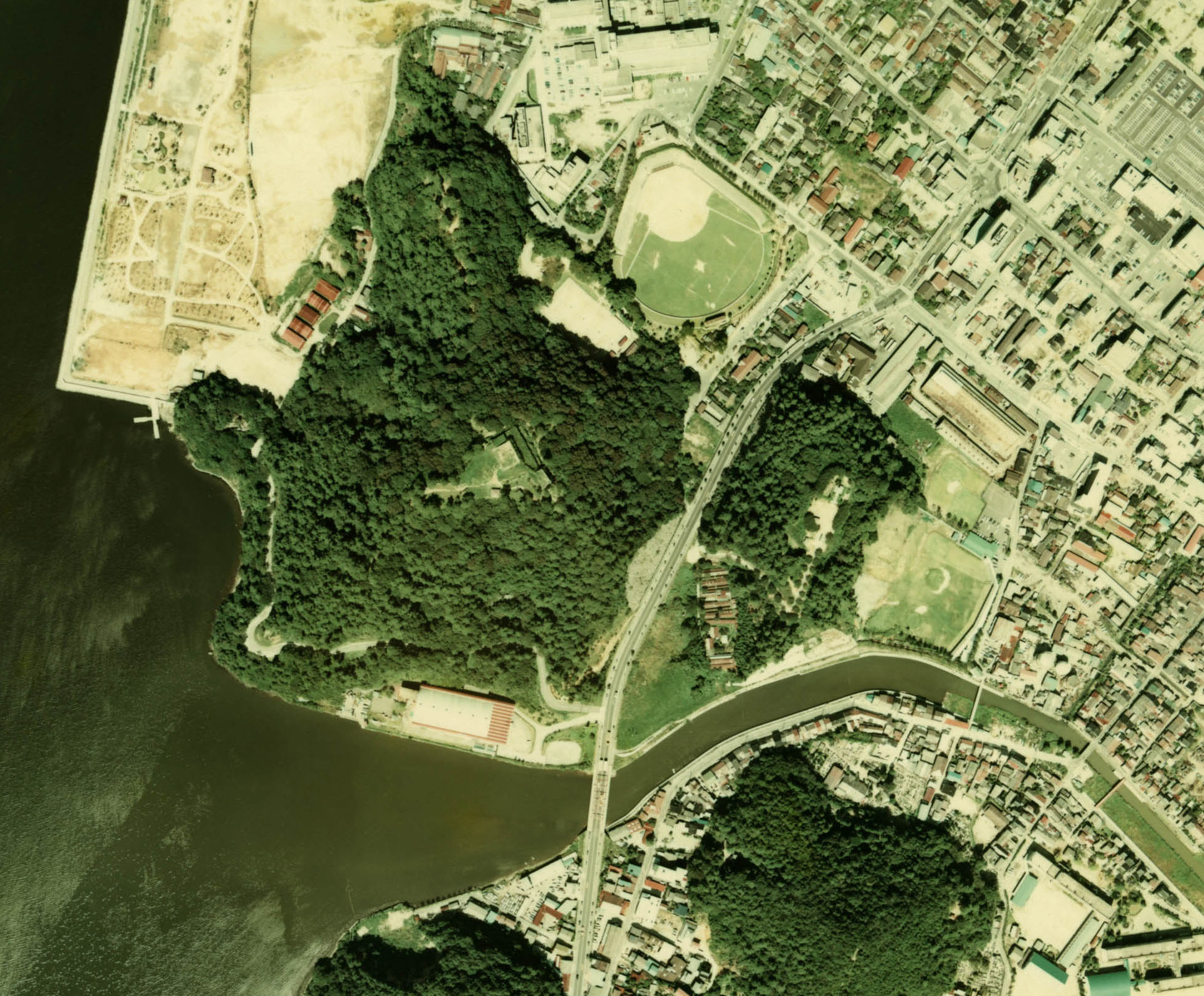
- Yonago Castle from air

Site information
- Type: Japanese castle

Site history
- Built by: Kikkawa Hiroi

Garrison information
- Occupants: 35°25′31.07″N 133°19′26.31″E
- National Historic Site of Japan

Yonago Castle (米子城, Yonago-jō) was an Edo period Japanese castle located in the city of Yonago, Tottori Prefecture, in the San'in region of Japan. Its ruins have been protected as a National Historic Site since 2006. It was also called Kume Castle (久米城) or Minatoyama Castle (湊山城),

== Overview ==
Yonago Castle is located on the hill facing the Sea of Japan near the center of the city of Yonago in far western Tottori Prefecture (former Hōki Province). Originally a small castle was built in 1467 by Yamana Muneyuki on Mount Iinoyama, to the east of Yonago Castle, whereas Odaka Castle, some ten-kilometers to the south, was the main stronghold of the Yamana clan in the area. In 1591, this area came under the control of Kikkawa Hiroie, a grandson of Mōri Motonari, who had conquered most of the San'in region from the Amago clan. Kikkawa Hiroie rebuilt Yonago Castle as his residence and main stronghold as the areaway say to defense and controlled both land and maritime commerce in the region. Although the Kikkawa clan was nominally a cadet branch of the Mōri clan and subservient to Toyotomi Hideyori at the time of the 1600 Battle of Sekigahara, due to his strong antipathy towards Ishida Mitsunari, Kikkawa Hiroie had communications in secret with Tokugawa Ieyasu. When the order came for his forces to attack Ieyasu from the flank, Kikkawa Hiroie reportedly "went to lunch", not returning for several hours until after the battle was decided. After the battle, the victorious Tokugawa Ieyasu reduced the Mōri clan's holdings to only Nagato and Suo Provinces; Kikkawa Hiroie also lost his territories, but it was only through his actions that the Mōri clan was permitted to keep some of their territory.

The still uncompleted Yonago Castle was assigned to Nakamura Kazutada, formerly castellan of Sunpu Castle. He completed the castle in 1601 including a 4-story large tenshu, 4-story small tenshu, 30 yagura turrets and seawater moats. and Nakamura clan moved from Odaka Castle to the castle. As he had no heir, his domains reverted to the Tokugawa shogunate on his death and were subsequently made part of the holdings of the Ikeda clan at Tottori Domain. The Ikeda appointed their hereditary karō, the Arao clan, as castellans, and the castle remained a branch castle of Tottori Domain until the Meiji restoration.

The Meiji government ordered all of the remaining structures of the castle to be destroyed in 1874, although much of the stone walls and moats remain. One gate, the Ohara Nagayamon Gate, is a remaining original structure. The site is now maintained as a park, and is a 20 minute walk from JR West San'in Main Line Yonago Station.

Yonago Castle was listed as one of the Continued Top 100 Japanese Castles in 2017.

== See also ==
- List of Historic Sites of Japan (Tottori)

== Literature ==
- De Lange, William (2021). An Encyclopedia of Japanese Castles. Groningen: Toyo Press. pp. 600 pages. ISBN 978-9492722300.
