= Odaka Castle =

Castle in Tottori, Japan

- 尾高城
- Yonago, Tottori Prefecture, Japan
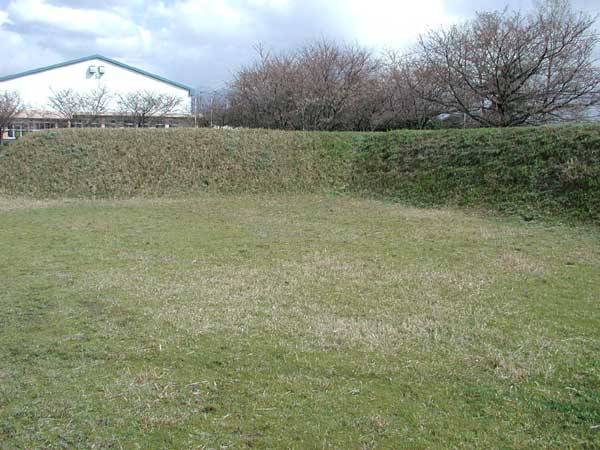
- Odaka Castle earthworks, 2002

Site information
- Type: Hirayama-style Japanese castle
- Owner: Yukimatsu clan, Amago clan, Mōri clan, Nakamura clan
- Condition: ruins

Location
- Location within Tottori Prefecture Location within Japan
- Coordinates: 35°25′15.4″N 133°24′42.4″E

Site history
- Built: Kamakura period
- Demolished: 1601
- Battles/wars: Siege of Odaka Castle

Garrison information
- Past commanders: Yukimatsu Masamori, Sugihara Morishige; Yoshida Motoshige; Nakamura Kazutada
- National Historic Site of Japan

Odaka Castle (尾高城, Odaka-jō)) was a hirayama-style Japanese castle located in the Odaka neighbourhood of the city of Yonago, Tottori Prefecture in western Japan. It was also known as Izumiyama Castle (泉山城, Izumiyama-jō)). Its ruins have been protected as a National Historic Site since 2019.

== Overview ==
Odaka Castle is located on a fluvial terrace 40 meters above sea level, it overlooks Mount Daisen and the Minokaya Plain. During the Sengoku period, it was a strategic point in western Hōki Province and was the site of conflicts between the Amago and Mōri clans. The early history of the castle is uncertain. Archaeological excavations conducted in 1974 during the construction of the Yonago Workers' General Welfare Center "Yonago Heights," found imported and domestic ceramics, ancient coins, hairpins, and knives dating from the 13th to 16th centuries, suggesting that it began as the stronghold of a local warlord in the Kamakura period. In the Nanboku-chō period it was ruled by the Yukimasa clan, who were vassals of the Amago. Yukimasa Masamori was expelled by the Amago in 1524, but returned with the Mōri armies in 1562 and regained the castle. He died the following year, and Sugihara Morishige, a retainer of the Mōri became castellan. He expanded the castle and improved its defences. In 1569, the Amago under Yamanaka Yukinori returned and briefly retook Odaka Castle, but were unable to hold it. It is said that Yamanaka Yukimori was captured and put in prison in the castle but later he succeeded in escape. Following defeat of the Mōri clan at the Battle of Sekigahara in 1600, Nakamura Kazutada was made daimyo of the newly-created 175,000 koku Yonago Domain by the Tokugawa shogunate and made Odaka Castle his stronghold. After he located to the new Yonago Castle, Odaka Castle was demolished.

In 1977, the castle ruins were designated as a Yonago City Historic Site. Excavations conducted since 2022 revealed the existence of stone walls in the main keep and second enclosure. The site was elevated to that of a National Historic Site in 2024.

== See also ==
- List of Historic Sites of Japan (Tottori)

== Literature ==
- Benesch, Oleg and Ran Zwigenberg (2019). Japan's Castles: Citadels of Modernity in War and Peace. Cambridge: Cambridge University Press. p. 374. ISBN 9781108481946.
- De Lange, William (2021). An Encyclopedia of Japanese Castles. Groningen: Toyo Press. pp. 600 pages. ISBN 978-9492722300.
