= Kuniyoshi Castle =

Castle ruins in Hioki, Japan

Coordinates: 35°36′49″N 135°57′58″E

- 国吉城
- Mihama, Fukui, Fukui Prefecture, Japan
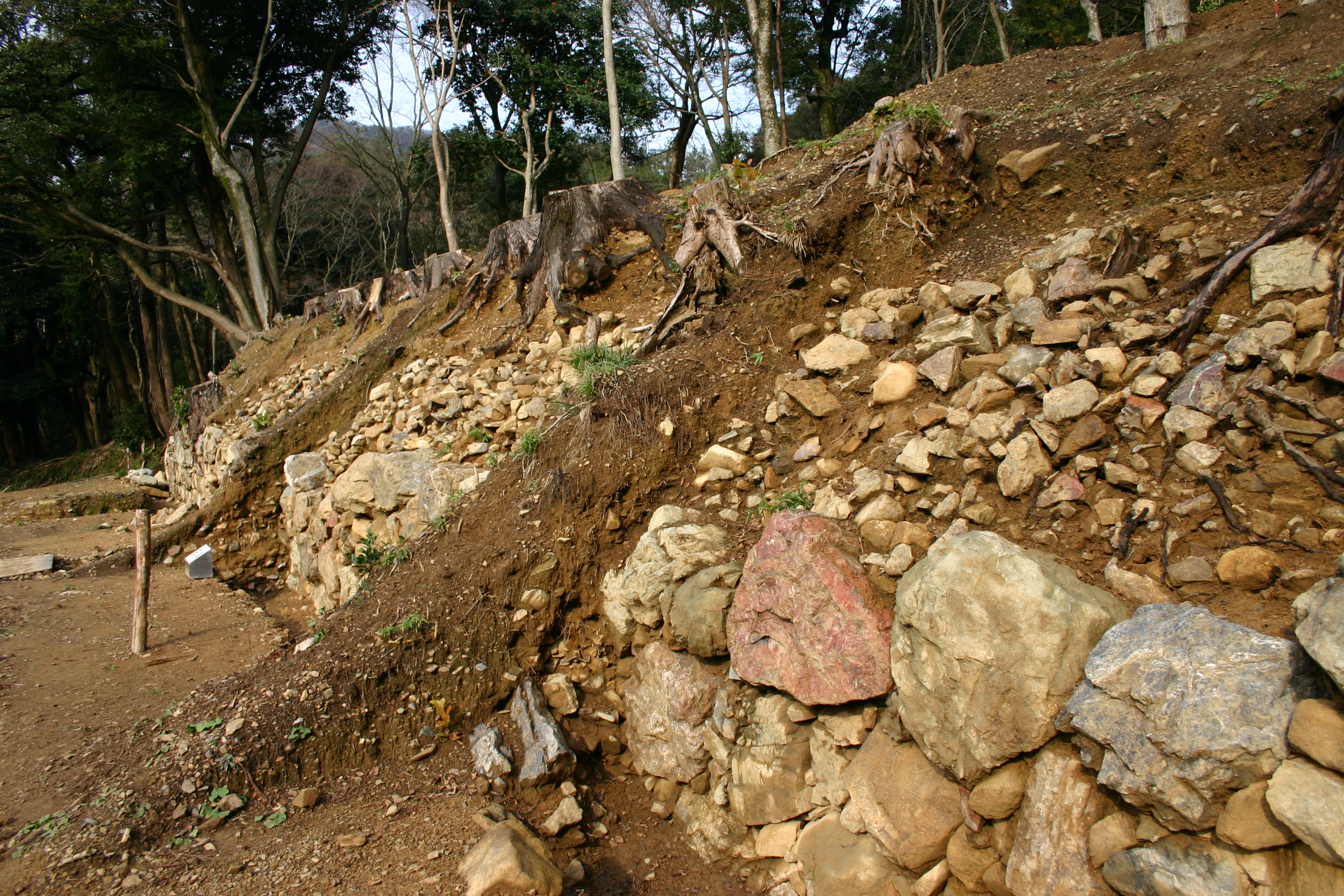
- Stone wall of Awaya's residence

Site information
- Type: Mountaintop-style castle
- Owner: Awaya clan
- Condition: ruins

Location

Site history
- Built: 1556
- Built by: Awaya Katsuhisa
- Demolished: 1615

Garrison information
- Past commanders: Awaya Katsuhisa, Kimura Shigekore

Kuniyoshi Castle (国吉城, Kuniyoshi-jō) is a castle structure in Fukui, Fukui Prefecture, Japan.

== Current ==
The castle is now only ruins, with some stone walls and moats. In 2017, the castle was listed as one of the Continued Top 100 Japanese Castles.
