= Sugihara Morishige =

Japanese samurai

- 杉原 盛重
- Born: 1533; Aki Province
- Died: 19 January 1582 (aged 48–49); Iwami Province
- Military career
- Commands: Kannabe Castle, Odaka Castle, Yatsuhashi Castle

Sugihara Morishige (杉原 盛重; 1533 – 1582) was a Japanese samurai and commander of the Sengoku period who served the Mōri clan. He was in charge of the conquest of mainly the San'in region and often fought together with Kikkawa Motoharu.

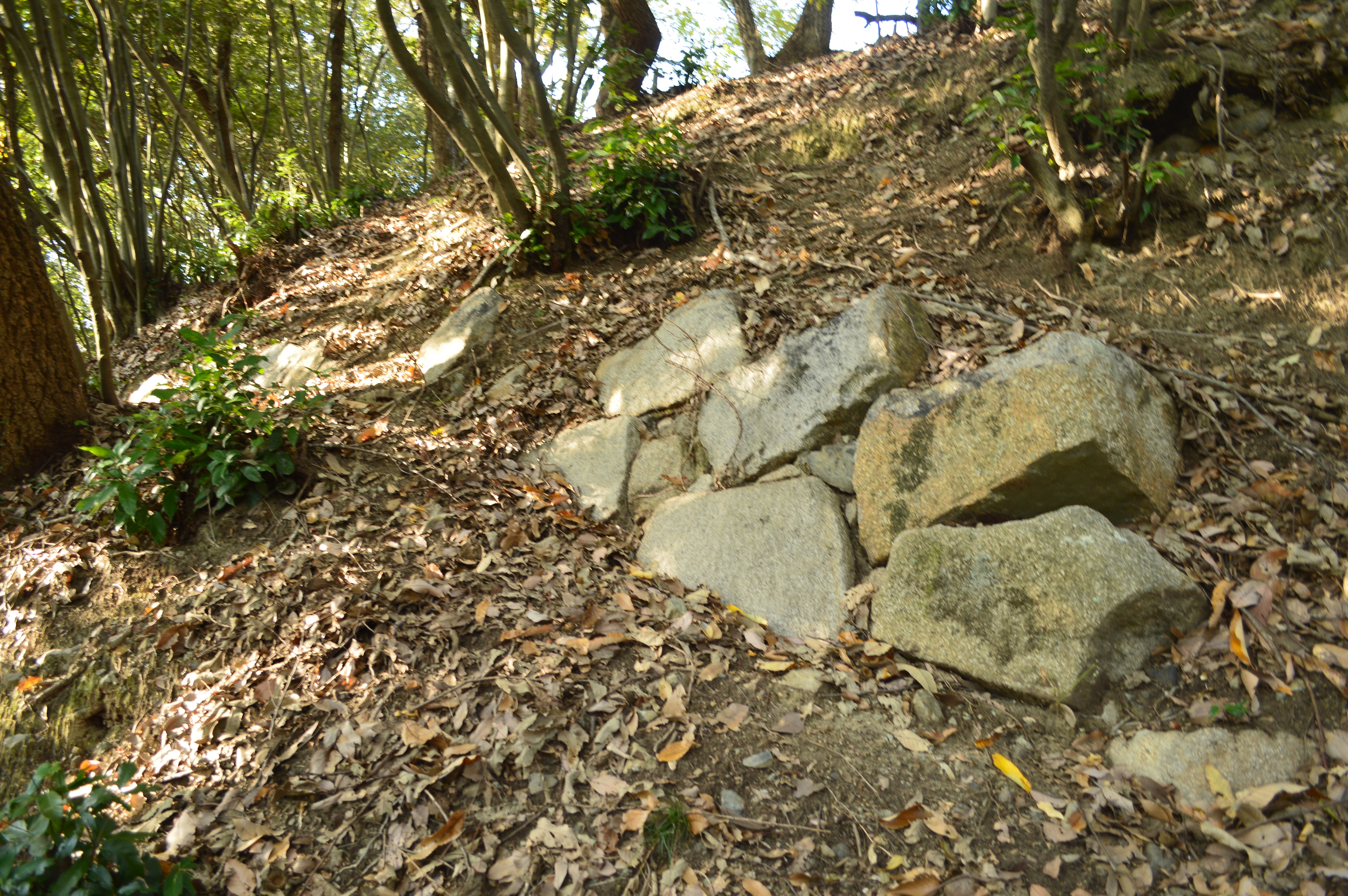
Remaining stone wall of Kannabe Caste
