= Kōnomine Castle =

Castle ruins in Yamaguchi, Japan

- 高嶺城
- Yamaguchi (city), Japan
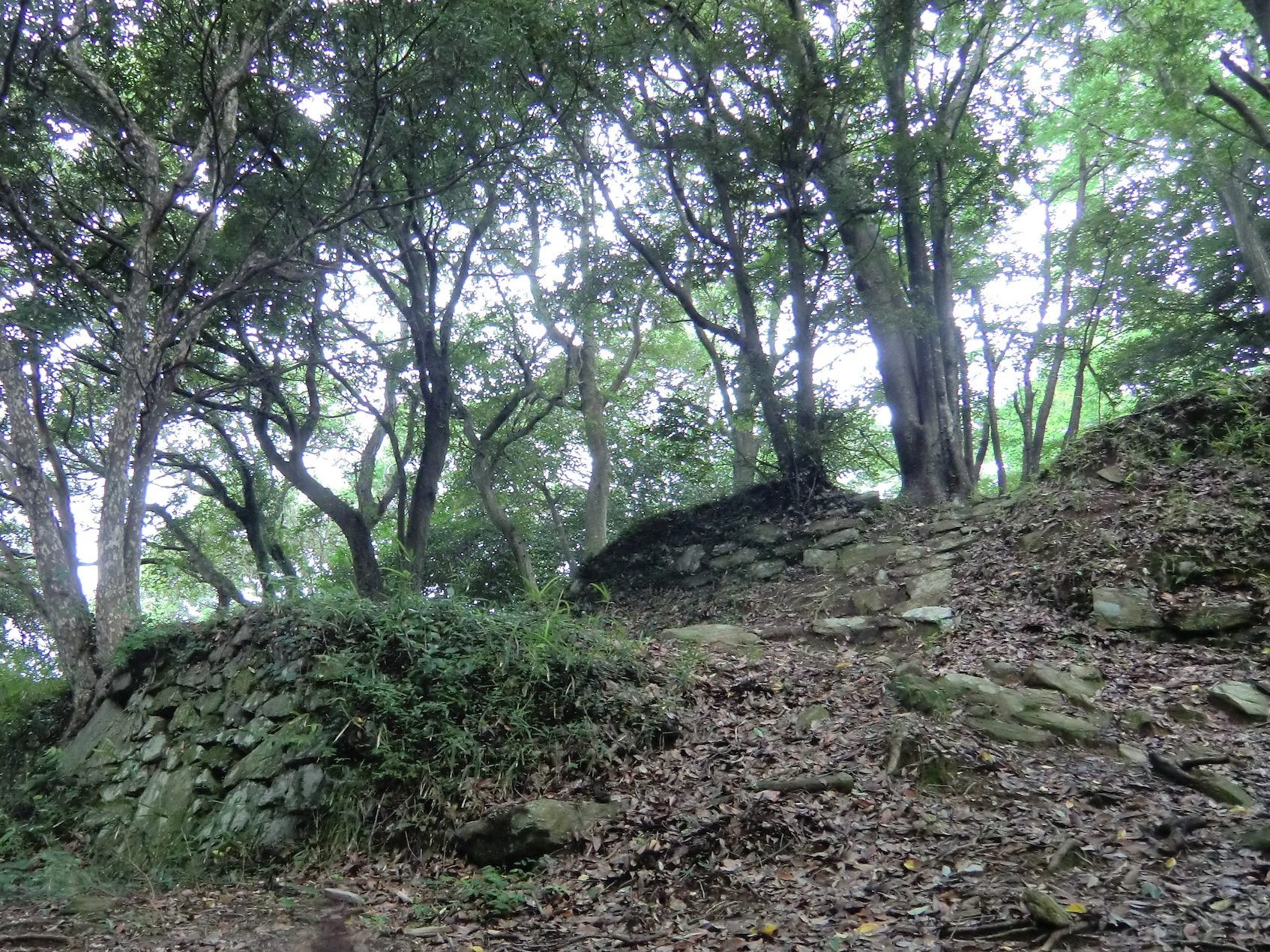
- Stone walls of Main Base

Site information
- Type: Mountaintop castle
- Owner: Ōuchi clan, Mōri clan
- Condition: ruins

Site history
- Built: 1556
- Built by: Ōuchi Yoshinaga
- Demolished: 1638

Garrison information
- Past commanders: Ōuchi Yoshinaga, Ichikawa Tsuneyoshi

Kōnomine Castle (高嶺城, Kōnomine-jō) is a castle structure in Yamaguchi, Japan. It is located on a 338 meter mountain.

== History ==
Kōnomine Castle was built in 1556 by Ōuchi Yoshinaga as a supporting castle of Ōuchi-shi Yakata, but Mōri Motonari`s army advanced to Suō Province, Ōuchi Yoshinaga left Ōuchi-shi Yakata and Kōnomine Castle without resistance.

In 1638, Kōnomine castle was abandoned. The castle was listed as one of the Continued Top 100 Japanese Castles in 2017.

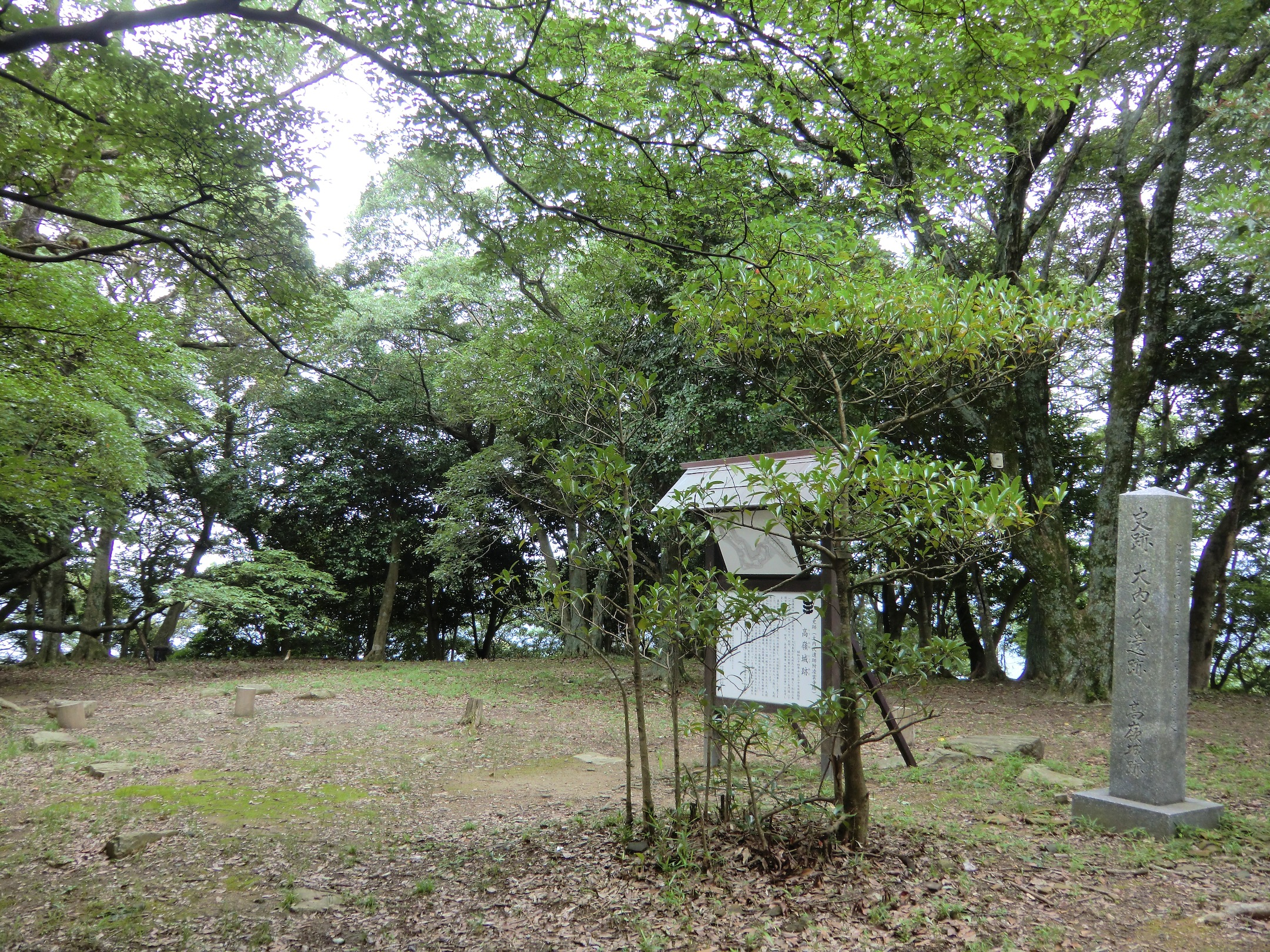
Main Base of Kōnomine Castle

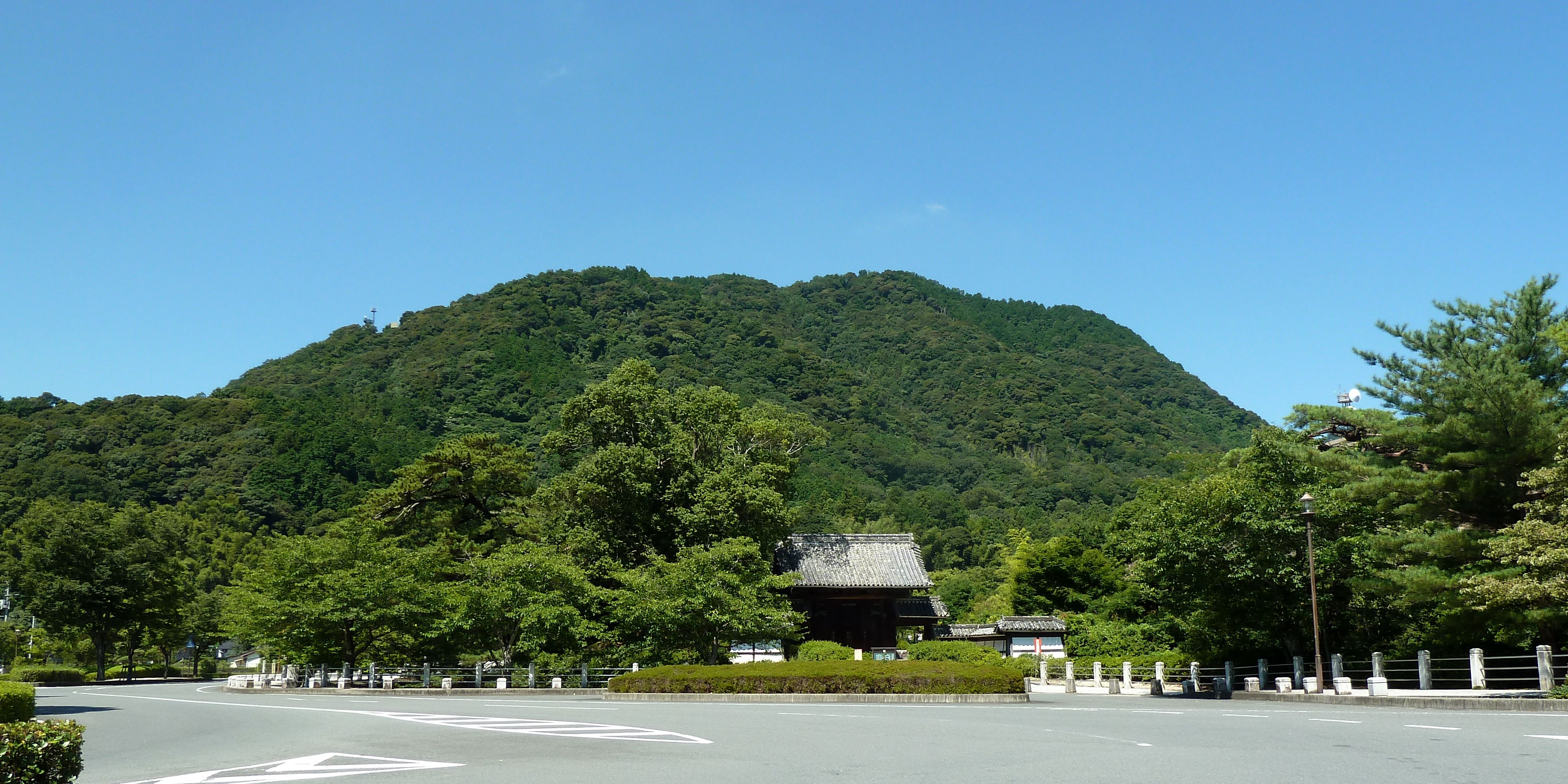
Kōnomine Castle

== Current ==
The castle is now only ruins, with some stone walls and moats left intact.

== Literature ==
- De Lange, William (2021). An Encyclopedia of Japanese Castles. Groningen: Toyo Press. pp. 600 pages. ISBN 978-9492722300.
