= 1751 Takada earthquake =

Earthquake in Japan

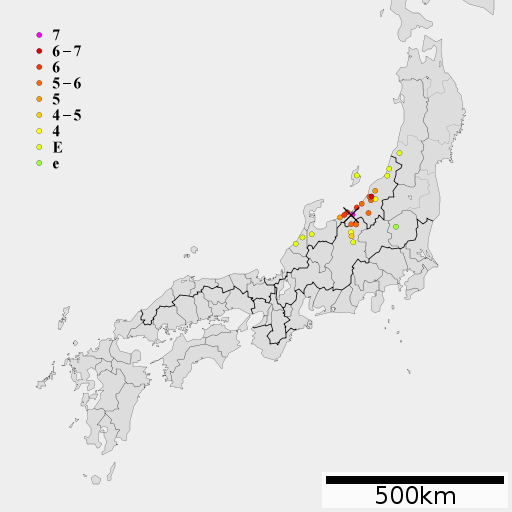
- Seismic intensity map
- Local date: May 21, 1751
- Magnitude: M 7.0–7.4
- Epicenter: 37.2°N 138.1°E
- Type: Intraplate
- Areas affected: Japan
- Landslides: Yes
- Casualties: 2,100 dead

The 1751 Takada earthquake struck central Japan's Joetsu City in present-day Niigata Prefecture on 21 May at 02:00 local time. The earthquake with an estimated magnitude of 7.0–7.4 killed an estimated 2,100 people while up to 9,000 homes were levelled. Based on an analysis of damage distribution, Nishiyama and others determined the epicenter region to be in the mountainous area between Jōetsu and Kuwadori Valley.

== See also ==
- List of earthquakes in Japan
- List of historical earthquakes
