= Ōkuma Tomohide =

Japanese samurai of the Sengoku period

Ōkuma Tomohide (大熊朝秀; 1517 – 3 April 1582) was a Japanese samurai of the Sengoku period. He served the Uesugi clan, but later switched allegiances and became a retainer of the Takeda clan of Kai Province. He died with Takeda Katsuyori at the Battle of Tenmokuzan.

Tomohide's descendants became the chief retainers of the Sanada clan.
