= Silken Painting of Emperor Go-Daigo =

Painting by Bunkanbo Koshin

- 絹本著色後醍醐天皇御像 (Japanese)
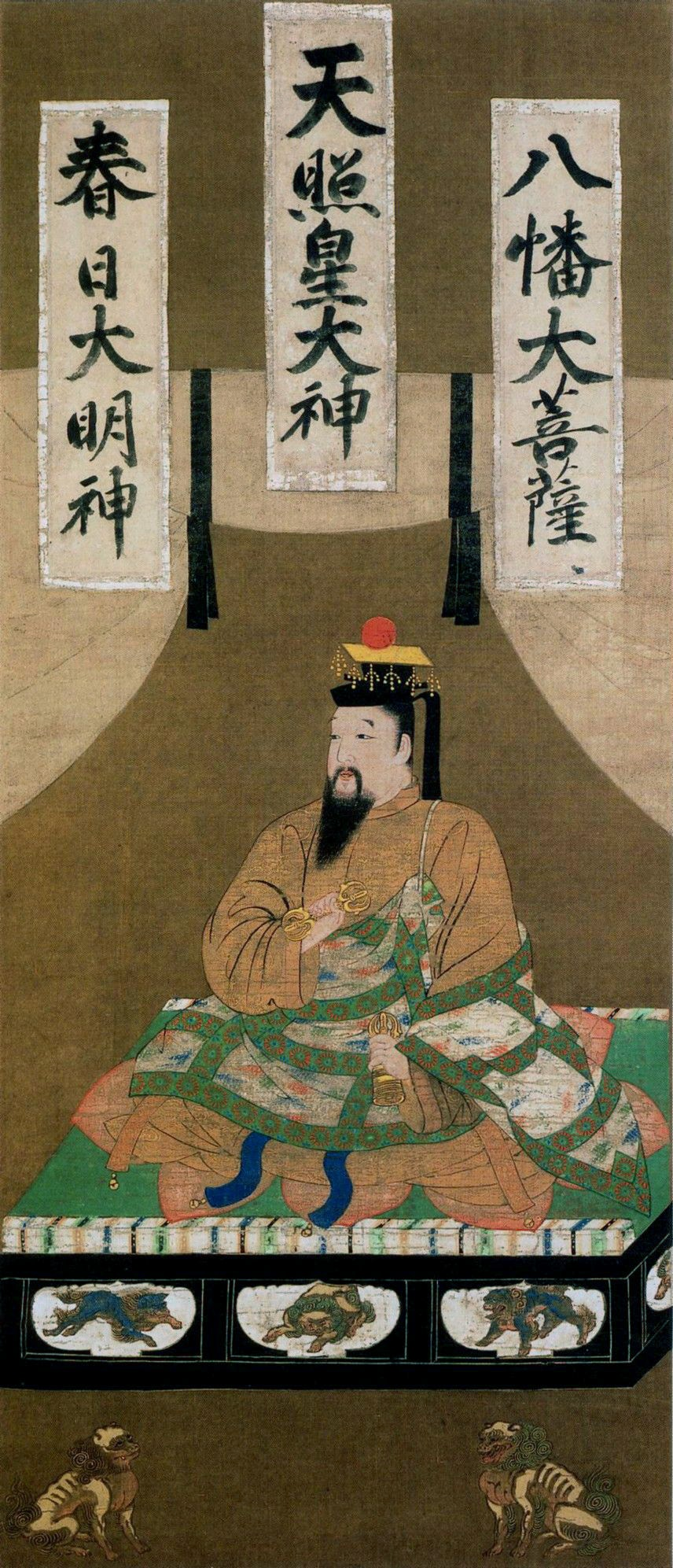
- Artist: Bunkanbo Koshin
- Completion date: October 23, 1339
- Type: Color on silk, Buddhist painting.
- Medium: Color on silk
- Subject: Emperor Go-Daigo
- Dimensions: 94.0 cm × 49.8 cm (37.0 in × 19.6 in)
- Designation: Important Cultural Property (Japan)
- Location: Shōjōkō-ji, Fujisawa City, Kanagawa Prefecture
- Owner: Shōjōkō-ji

Silken Painting of Emperor Go-Daigo is a portrait and Buddhist painting of Emperor Go-Daigo from the Nanboku-chō period. The painting was supervised by the Buddhist priest and protector of Emperor Go-Daigo, Bunkanbo Koshin. After his death, Buddhābhiṣeka opened his eyes on September 20, October 23, 1339, the fourth year of Enen4/Ryakuō, during the 57th day Buddhist memorial service. (Note: Buddhābhiṣeka is a ceremony in which the eyes are painted on a new statue or painting to complete it and to put the soul into it.。)Meiji 33rd year (1900), April 7, designated as Important Cultural Property. As Emperor of Japan rather than Cloistered Emperor, he was granted the highest Abhisheka (coronation ceremony) of Shingon Buddhism He was united with Vajrasattva, a Bodhisattva, as a secular emperor, and became a symbol of the unification of the royal law, Buddhism, and Shintoism under the Sanja-takusen, in which the three divine symbols were written. After the end of the Civil War of the Northern and Southern Dynasties, it was transferred to the head temple of the Tokishu sect, Shōjōkō-ji (Kanagawa Prefecture Fujisawa, Kanagawa), by the 12th Yūkyō Shōnin, a cousin of Go-Daigo and the founder of the Tokishu sect. During the Sengoku period, it became an object of worship for the Tokimune sect of the time, and copies were made. Because it is directly related to the theory of kingship in the Kenmu Restoration, it is important in Art history, History of religion, and Political history. It is said to show the legitimate kingship as the protector of Vajrayana succeeding his father, Emperor Go-Uda, as well as the harmonious political and religious kingship as in the reign of Prince Shōtoku.

== Overview ==
On October 26, 1330, the year before the Genkō War against the Kamakura shogunate, Emperor Go-Daigo was given a ritual called the Yu-Gi-Kanjo at Jounei-Den in the palace by his Buddhist confidant and renowned painter, Bunkanbo Koshin. This was the most sacred ritual of the Shingon Buddhism of the time, as it was said to be the "ultimate perfumation" and "the highest attainment of esoteric Buddhism. The only thing higher than this is the attainment of Buddhahood. Although it is exceptional for a secular emperor to receive the Yu Gion Puja, it is believed that he followed in the footsteps of his father, Emperor Go-Uda, who was also a prominent practitioner of esoteric Buddhism, and that he had practiced enough to qualify for the Yu Gion Puja. This is not unusual. Godaigo, who was a loving wife, asked Bunkan to have the middle palace, Saionji Kishi, undergo the same ceremony on November 23 of the same year. This work was painted under the supervision (or actual production) of Fumikan Shonin himself, who led the perfuming ceremony, as a representation of the Yu-Gi perfuming scene. On September 20, Engen4/Ryakuō2 (October 23, 1339), thirty-five days after the fall of Go-Daigo, the Buddhist priest instructed Bunkan in the Buddhābhiṣeka and completed it.

The setting depicts a scene in which he was 43 years old, but since his portrait shows features of old age, it is thought that he actually modeled his face at the time of his death, when he was about 52 years old. The composition in the painting shows him uniting with Vajrasattva, the second founder of Shingon Buddhism, a Bodhisattva who acts as an intermediary between man and Buddha (Vairocana). Vajrasattva, a bodhisattva. It is also said to be related to Go-Daigo's belief in Rāgarāja, one of the incarnations of Vajrasattva. He is said to be wearing a Emperor Jimmu Benkan, Emperor Chūai Mianfu, National Treasure, and Buddhism, the Kūkai kesa of Kōbō Daishi, from the collection of Tō-ji. However, it seems that these treasures were not available for reference at the time of painting, and the kesa in particular is clearly different from the real thing. In addition, the crown (Emperor Jinmu's crown) and the ordinary crown are worn twice, which is thought to be an imitation of the Śrīmālādevī Siṃhanāda Sūtra of Prince Shotoku, who was regarded as a supreme being in both the sacred and secular realms. It is thought to be a copy of the Śrīmālādevī Siṃhanāda Sūtra The upper three oracles, Amaterasu, Kasuga Gongen, and Hachiman, respectively, preside over honesty, compassion, and purity, and are associated with the Imperial House of Japan, Kuge (Fujiwara clan), Buke (Seiwa Genji). This image shows that Emperor Go-Daigo, as Vajrasattva, identified with these three Shinto deities and became the center of royal law, Buddhism, and Shintoism.

However, it is unclear whether this work was created under the direction of Go-Daigo himself or his dying wish. However, it is not clear whether the deification of this work was directed by Go-Daigo himself or his dying wish. It is thought that the deification of this work was done hastily as a memorial to the emperor before the 57th day memorial service after his death, and the deification was done by projecting the impressions that Bunkan and other senior retainers of the Southern Court had of Go-Daigo.

On August 1, 1396, four years after the unification of the Northern and Southern dynasties, the temple passed from the hands of a former vassal of the Southern dynasty to the hands of the 12th head of the Toki sect, Youko Shonin, who was the founder of the Toki sect. He was the son of Prince Tsuneaki, the prince of Emperor Kameyama (the grandfather of Emperor Go-Daigo), and was also a cousin of Emperor Go-Daigo. Afterwards, it was kept in Shōjōkō-ji (Kanagawa Prefecture, Fujisawa City), the head temple of the Ji-shu sect. On March 21, Eishō (Muromachi period)14 (1517), a copy of the statue was made by a priest of the Ji-shu, Yaamida Buddha, and worship was conducted through the copy. In this case, according to the Honji suijaku theory, it is thought that the goddess Amaterasu was worshipped as Vairocana, the bodhisattva Hachiman as Amitābha, the main deity of the Tokishu, and Kasuga Daimyojin as Amida's assistant, the snare Kannon. It is also believed that Amitābha was worshipped as Amitābha.

On April 7, 1900, the statue was designated as a National Treasure at the time and later as an Important Cultural Property as a "silken copy of the statue of Emperor Godaigo.

Because of its striking features, this work has often been discussed in connection with the theory of kingship of the Kemmu regime, and because until the 20th century, research on the imperial court during the Kamakura period lagged behind and Emperor Go-Daigo's political skills were not highly regarded, it was used as a symbolic image in Yoshihiko Amino's theory of "deformed kingship" in the 1980s. However, since around 2000, it has been used as a symbolic image of Godaigo. However, a reevaluation of Godaigo's political skills began around 2000, and as of the 2010s, although the Kemmu regime collapsed with complicated twists and turns, its policies themselves were realistic and excellent, and the smooth continuity between the Kamakura period, the Kemmu regime, and the Muromachi shogunate has come to be evaluated. As for the interpretation of this work as of the beginning of the 21st century, the first is that it is an interpretation of the kingship theory of this work. The first is that the figure is the successor of his father, Go-Uta. The first is that he is the successor of his father, Go-Uta. Go-Uta was also famous as an esoteric Buddhist monk, and he is the patron of Shingon esoteric Buddhism, which can be interpreted as the legitimate royal authority to succeed the Daigakuji lineage (the imperial lineage to which Go-Daigo belongs). Secondly, it can be inferred that it represents Go-Daigo's faith in Taishi. Unlike his father, Go-Daigo, who was more devoted to religion than to politics in his later years, Shotoku-Taishi, who had an excellent sense of balance between politics and religion and made outstanding achievements in both, may have been considered the ideal king, and he himself may have been regarded as such by those around him.

== The creator ==
The production was supervised and Kaigen was done by Monkanbo Koshin . Monkan was a Buddhist priest of the Shingon Ritsushu and Daigo schools of Shingon Buddhism, and served as the head of Daigo-ji, Shitennō-ji, Bettō, and the first chief priest of Toji in the Go-Daigo dynasty, as well as the head of all Buddhist affairs in the Sōkan of the Ritsuryo system. He was one of the most important figures in Emperor Go-Daigo's Buddhist policy and beliefs.

In addition, Bunkan was one of the most famous painters of the Middle Ages, described as "extraordinary" (不凡) in Kano Eienō's Honcho-ga-shi in Enpō 6 (1679). who was one of the most famous painters of the Middle Ages, and painted the Important Cultural Property "Monju (Manjusri) with Five Characters in Chinese Characters on Silk" on June 9, Kenmu June 9 (1334). For this reason, it has been said that he may have been involved in the actual production of this work as well as the supervision and Buddhābhiseka.

== Creation date ==
The "Emperor Go-Daigo's Reflections" in the "Genealogy of the Twelfth Sonkan Shonin" says (Note: 内田論文では「天皇聊御影向奇瑞在之云々」とあるが、遠山論文では「天皇聊御影向希瑞在之云々」とある。)

On the sixteenth day of the eighth month of the fourth year of the reign of the Emperor (the year of the Emperor / fifty-two), on the thirty-fifth day of the Emperor's buddhist ministry, the mandala for the Emperor's tutor, the Daigoji Temple seated master Ono Juho Zen High Priestess Koshin, the Head of Daigoji Temple, Reiou Jiou, the time of the Buddhābhiseka, the Emperor chatting to the shadow of the Emperor to the strange in the clouds, the rest of the people do not see the reason was recorded

— The Record of Seichojokoji Temple" "The Emperor Go-Daigo's Imperial Shadow

In other words, Emperor Go-Daigo died on August 16, Engen4/Ryakuō2 (September 19, 1339), and Emperor Go-Daigo abdicated (Note: Strictly speaking, Godaigo abdicated the day before his death and Prince Giora acceded as Emperor Go-Murakami, so at the time of his death, he was "Godaigo-in" and "Godaigo-shogun", but to avoid complications, this article describes him without making any distinction. In this article, we do not distinguish between the two.) On the 35th day of the festival, a mandala service is held. (Note: The service is the most spectacular Buddhist memorial service in Esoteric Buddhism, held around the Mandala of the Two Realms。) was conducted by Hiroshimaru Bunkanbo. Bunkan described this work as Buddhābhiseka. The idea was that Emperor Go-Daigo would appear as a "Kagemukai," or a god and a Buddha. However, the strangeness was not visible to anyone other than the author of this document.

Since it was not completed until after his death, it is unclear whether the composition and production of this work are the result of Godaigo's will or dying wish.According to Keiichi Uchida's conjecture, the creation of this work was not the will of the artist himself, but rather the idealized image of Go-Daigo in the eyes of those who admired the previous emperor who was left behind in the Southern Court after the collapse of Go-Daigo, and such idealized image from those around him may have been projected onto this work.According to the speculation of Motohiro Toyama, this work was originally painted as a normal portrait under the direction of Bunkan during the lifetime of Go-Daigo, but Bunkan regretted that he died before it was completed and hastily changed it to a deified image as an object of worship as a memorial to him.

== Content ==
=== Basic Information ===
Painted on silk with colors. The size is 94.0 cm long and 49.8 cm wide.

=== Scenes and Basic Historical Documents ===
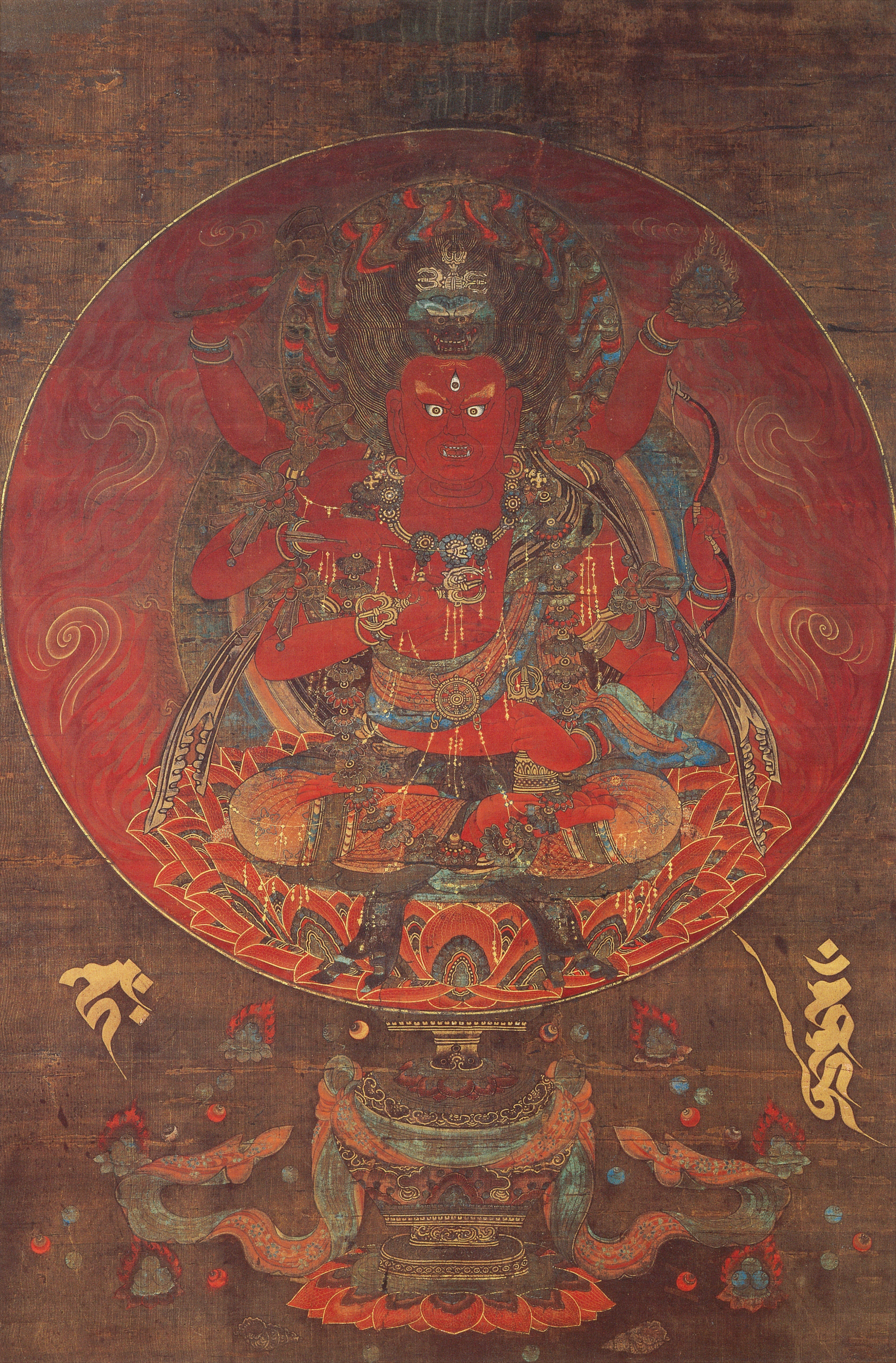
Bunkan-ga? Rāgarāja and the Yūgi Kantō in this painting are both based on the Yūgi Sutra. Both Rāgarāja and the Yu Gion Kantō in this painting are based on the Yu Gion Sutra.

The head temple of the Tokishu sect, Shōjōkō-ji, which holds this work, has a historical document called "The Genealogy of the Twelfth Sonkan Shonin," of which three documents record the history of this work. It is sometimes referred to as the Shōjōkō-ji Record, as if the three documents were separate, but in fact they are three sections of the same document. In 2014, a paper by Motohiro Toyama, director of the Shōjōkō-ji Treasure Museum, published a photograph and reprinted the entire genealogical tree for the first time.

The following is a record of the contents of the "Yu-Gi-Go-Kan-To" section of the "Genealogy of the Twelfth Sonkan Shonin" (punctuation marks are by Keiichi Uchida). (Note: In the Toyama paper, the part about the three countries is changed to "the three countries have inherited the Kesa of the son of Duan (grain futoshi).)

On the 26th day of the 10th lunar month of the 2nd year of Won-Toku, the robe was given to the Emperor in the hall of the Royal Festival, and the robe was worn by the Emperor of Gods, the Emperor of Gods, and the Emperor of Gods.

— The Record of Seicho Jokoji Temple, "Yu-gi Gokantei no Joto.

In addition, as a related source, the following is recorded in the Yūkya Dendōshō (Shōhei20/Jōji4 (1365)), written by Bōren, a high brother of Bunkan, (the reading is from this article).

On the 26th day of the 10th month of the 2nd year of the Yuandeok era At the Goshisho-den, the Lord of the Yu-Gi Guru was conferred with the Imperial Crown of Emperor Shinmu and the Emperor Nakagai's robe, and the robe was used by the Sangha of the Eastern Temple.

— Hōren 宝蓮, Yuga dentōshō

Overall, it is a drawing of the time when Bunkan gave the emperor Go-Daigo the Yu-Gi Kanjo (Yu-Gi Kanjo) on October 26, Gentoku 2 (1330) at a place called Gosetsuden in the palace However, according to Hideo Kuroda, since the eyebrows are drooping and other characteristics of old age can be seen, the painting itself may have been drawn not at the age of 43, but at the age of 52 at the time of his death .

The location of the Gosetsuden is unknown, but Keiichi Uchida suggests that it may be Jounei-den, one of the seven halls of the Inner Palace in Interior . The reason for this is that Jounei-jeon was also called Gosetsuden or Gosetsokoro, since the Five Section Dance was performed there .

The Yu Gion Puja is mainly based on the preface to the upper volume of the Yu Gion Sutra . It is the "ultimate perfusion" and "the highest attainment of Esoteric Buddhism" that is performed by the most secret scripture after the completion of Kechien-kanjyo (a ceremony to establish a relationship with a specific Buddha) and Denbo-kanjyo (a ceremony to follow the master's teachings and obtain Acharya) and after a considerable amount of study and asceticism. It is the "ultimate perfumation" and the "highest attainment of esoteric Buddhism.

The specific procedure of the Yu-Gi-Kan-Chan is detailed in the Kanagawa Prefecture Yokohama Shomyoji Temple's "Yu-Gi-Kan-Chan-Chan-Cho I-Ki", but it is a ritual that requires a considerable amount of knowledge and complicated procedures, and Uchida says that it shows how skilled Emperor Go-Daigo was in esoteric Buddhism.

The first step for those undergoing the ritual is to mask up and throw flowers.The next step is to "contemplate" the thirty-seven "samadhi forms" and twenty-two "seeds" as taught in the Yu-Gi Sutra in a specific procedure.The Samantabhadra form is a symbol that represents the object of esoteric worship in the form of a ritual object such as a vajra (the tool held by Godaigo in the iconography).A seed is a symbol that represents the object of worship in Sanskrit (Siddhartha) script. Contemplation is a ritual in which these symbols are drawn in the mind.Therefore, it is necessary to be familiar with esoteric Buddhism to go through the ritual.By successfully completing this ritual, one can receive an Inmyo (a symbol of truth in the form of fingers and words Mudra) from the master.

The Middle Ages was a time when Yu Giong Kuan Yin was relatively common, but even then it was a Kuan Yin that could only be given to a select few.Although Emperor Go-Daigo had already received a higher level of perfumation, namely, that of Acharya, a position that allowed him to take his own disciples, the Yu-Gi perfumation seems to have been of even greater value.It is an exceptional case that Emperor Go-Daigo, a secular person with the status of a ruler of heaven, was given this gift.However, although he was an exception to the rule, Go-Daigo had received perfunctions from Dojun, Eikai, Seien, and others, and even received Inka, Nioh Sutra Secret Treasure, and Ryobu Denpo Perfunctions from Bunkan.Therefore, the correct steps have been taken, and the flow is natural, he said.

On November 23 of the same year, Go-Daigo, who was also a loving wife, had his consort, the middle court princess Saionji Kishi, undergo the same ritual (Yuutai Dento Sho).

=== Unification with Vajrasattva ===
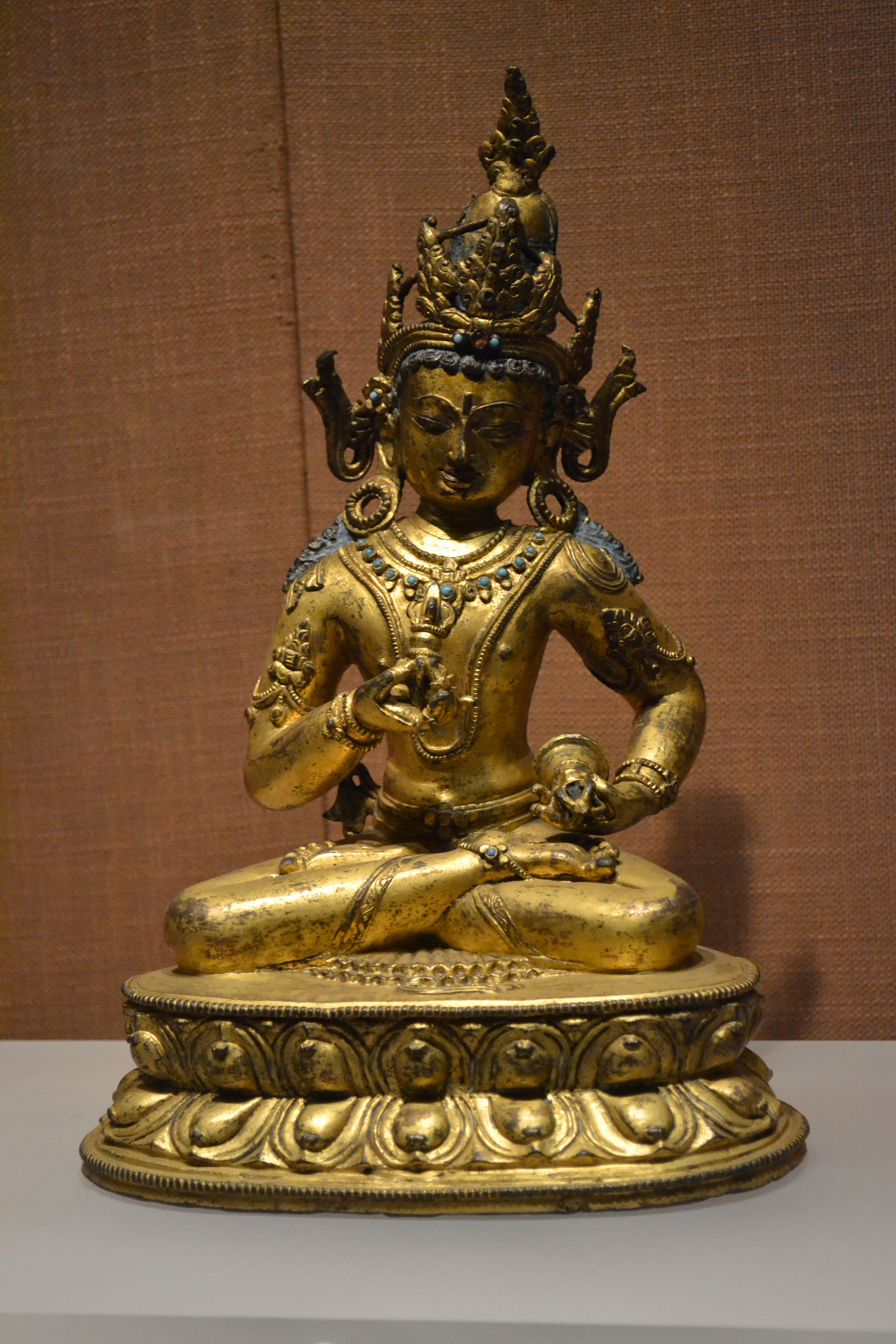
Statue of Vajrasattva, Tibet, 13th century to 14th century

Emperor Godaigo in the figure, holding in his right hand a Vajra (Kongo-sho, symbol of overcoming Vexations), with a vajra bell in his left hand (kongourei, a Buddhist tool to attract the attention of the nobles and make them happy) in his hand. In this image, the five-pronged pestle and five-pronged bell are used to represent the Five Wisdoms and Five Buddhas (the five kinds of wisdom of Dainichi Buddha). He is also seated on a seat covered with eight-leafed lotus flowers (the lotus on which Vairocana is seated in the pattern "Temple World").

This composition with a vajra in the right hand, a vajra bell in the left hand, and an eight-leaf lotus flower underneath is the same as Vajrasattva . Vajrasattva is a Bodhisattva (a pre-Buddhist practitioner), meaning "one who is as firm and courageous as Vajrasattva (the unbreakable stone)", and a Dainichi Buddha (the truth of the universe itself, Buddha (title), the second founder of Shingon Buddhism after Vairocana and, according to the Honji Suijaku theory, the home of Amaterasu, the ancestor god of the Emperor of Japan. As an intermediary between Buddha and human beings, he is said to be responsible for conveying the teachings of Dainichi Buddha to the human world, and is "a being who is both Buddha and not Buddha, and a person and not a person.

In the course of the practice of Yugioh, one sees oneself as being the same as a Buddha or a bodhisattva (Yugioh Kancho Iki). .

The Yu Gion Sutra is the most secret scripture of Shingon Esoteric Buddhism, and the Myoo depicted based on the Yu Gion Sutra is Rāgarāja . Aizenmyoo was also the most revered statue of Emperor Go-Daigo . Since Aizenmyoo is an incarnation of Kongosattva, Keiichi Uchida suggests that this work may also be a depiction of Emperor Go-Daigo's worship of Aizenmyoo .

=== Seating ===
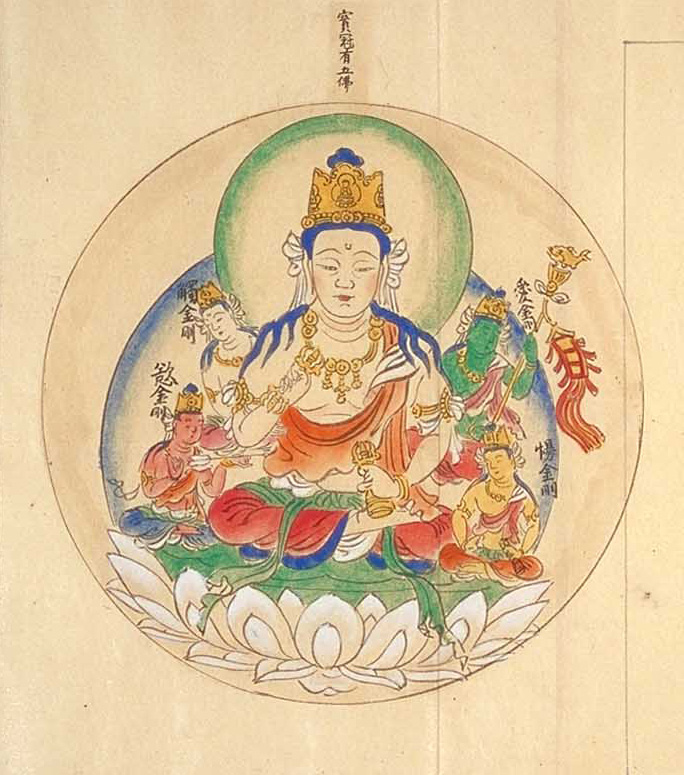
The Five Secret Laws of Vajrasattva, A Collection of Illustrations of Buddhist Statues, "Zu Zu Sho" (Kamakura era)

An interesting point in Buddhist art is that portraits of real people depict the eight-leaf lotus flower as a seating tool . Although the use of eight-leafed lotus flowers in perfuming was not entirely absent according to the procedures of the time, it is extremely rare for them to be depicted in portraits of monks . In addition to this work, there is a national treasure, Myoe Shōnin Jūjo Zazenzo (collection of Kōzan-ji), but that is not a perfumed scene, so it cannot be simply compared to this work . It is possible that there is some intention as to why the eight-leafed lotus flower is not depicted in the portrait of the monk, and why on the contrary it is depicted specifically in this work, but as of 2006 it is unknown . Uchida discusses the theory that the "Myoe Shonin Jujyo Zazenzo" is related to Monju Bosatsu, and also points out that the Saidai-ji school of Eizon and the Bunkan (the author of this work) associated with it also have a strong belief in Monju Bosatsu, but he avoids stating it explicitly

Underneath the lotus rug, there is a tatami mat with an unglazed edge, or a half tatami mat with the most prestigious tatami mat edge, and further underneath is a rei-ban . A lion is placed in the "kozama" of the reiban . Thus, this rei-ban is a "lion seat," that is, a seat on which only Buddhas, Bodhisattvas, and high priests are allowed to sit . According to Hideo Kuroda, it may be a representation of Godaigo as a holy Buddha or Bodhisattva .

The number of lions in Leo is usually one lion on the front or eight lions on each of the four sides . The number of three in this work is exceptional, but Kuroda suggests that it may have something to do with the sansha oracle (a strip of paper on which the names of the three deities are written) at the top .

=== Crown and robe ===
==== Iconography ====
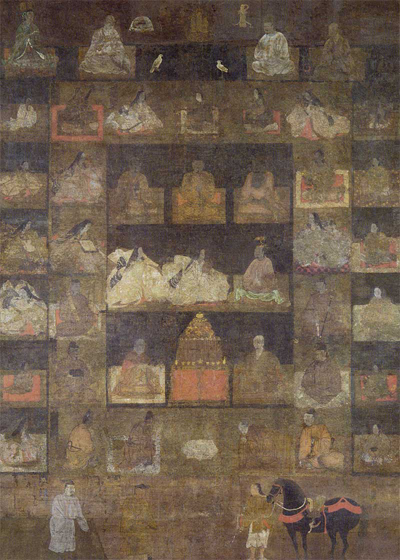
The Mandala of the Emperor Shōtoku, by Yōsō, dated 1255, in the collection of Hōryū-ji, Important Cultural Property (Japan). Prince Shōtoku, to the right of the woman in the center of the image, wears a Benkan on top of his normal crown, as in this work

The crown and Po (robe) worn by Emperor Go-Daigo in the image are imperial artifacts that are said to be the crown of the first Emperor Jimmu and the robe of the fourteenth Emperor Chūai, according to the record of the perfumery.

However, the image itself seems to have been painted after the perfuming, so it is not necessarily a direct copy of the real thing.

The Benkan of the figure is made of bright vermilion circles overlaid on the crown.The crown has twelve flags, or twelve strands of jade hanging down (six strands as only two sides of the crown are shown in the image), indicating that this is the crown used by the emperor when he is dressed in formal attire.

As can be seen from the kanmuri tail hanging down, the crown has a normal crown underneath it. Of course, this is not physically possible, but it is a pictorial representation with some kind of intention added.

There are two types of crowns, a Kanmuri and a Benkan, and Hiroki Hyodo speculates that "Emperor Jinmu's crown" refers to the Benkan.

The robe in the image is probably a straight robe, although it is difficult to tell because it is hidden by the robes . Although there are some differences, the design is basically in line with the imperial robes of the Blessings and imperial robes, which is modeled after the imperial robes of Tang Dynasty emperors, such as the cloud dragon pattern in gold and the sun and moon in gold on both shoulders. For example, cloud and dragon patterns are decorated with gold mud, and the sun and moon are painted on both shoulders with gold mud.The imperial robes are originally red, but in this portrait, they are painted in yellowish brown (ochre mixed with white), representing the color of the imperial robes, or "korozome," which has been the color of the emperor's formal robe since the time of Emperor Saga.

Medieval portraits of emperors are generally depicted in one of the following four forms: crowned, tied, girded, or as a monk.

==== Taiko Faith ====
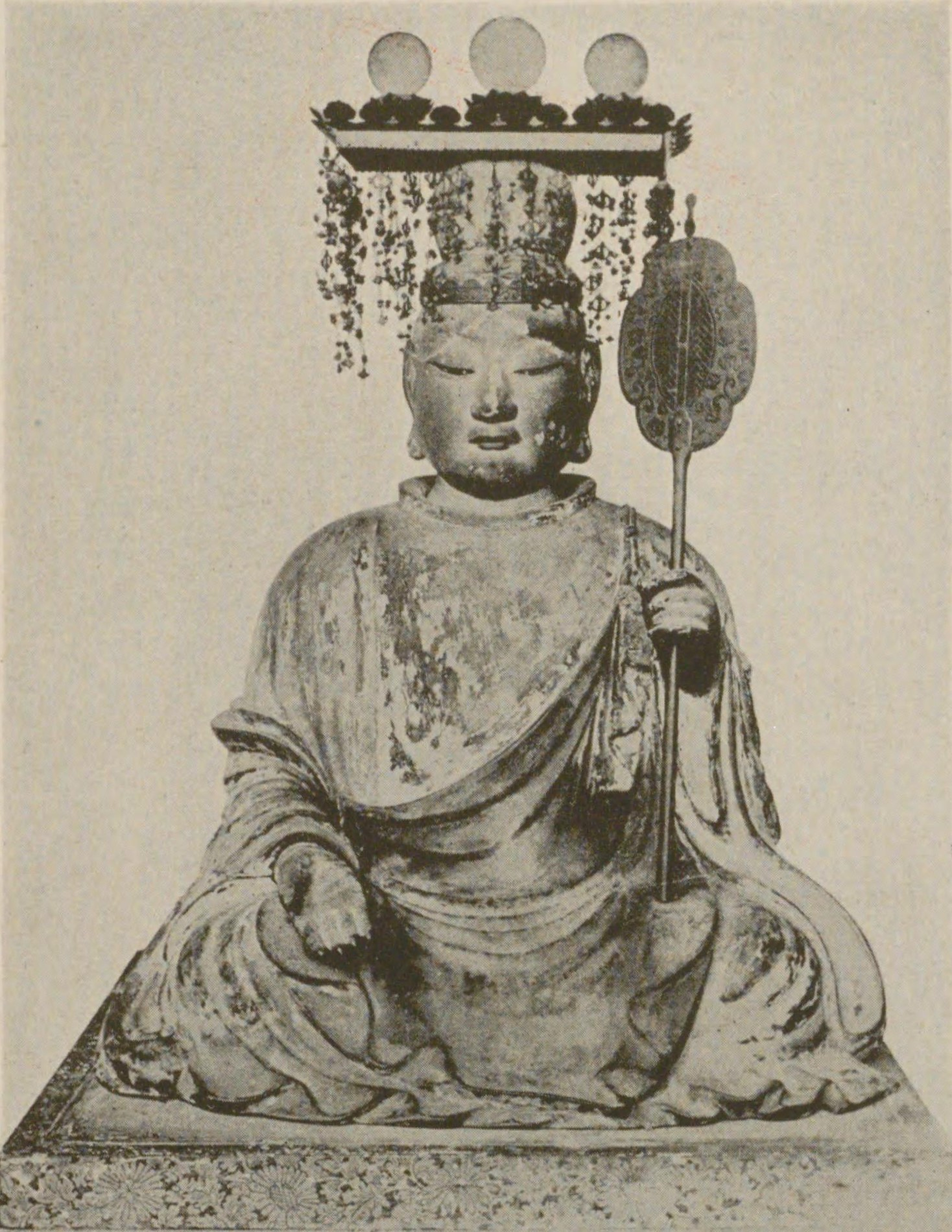
Wooden Seated Statue of Prince Shotoku (from the collection of Tachibana-ji, Important Cultural Property). The statue itself was made in Eishō12 (1515), depicting the crowned prince in the form of a kesa over a robe and a crown over a robe.

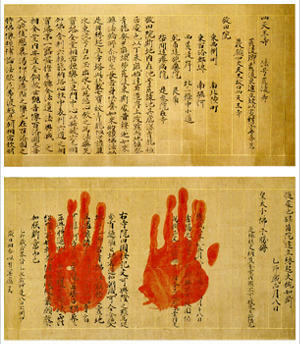
Emperor Go-Daigo, "Shitennoji Enki" (National Treasure, owned by Shitennoji)

Hideo Kuroda said that the overlapping crowns and caps are also found in Taishi Shotoku, suggesting that there may be a connection.

Sachiko Takeda took this argument further. At that time, the character of Prince Shotoku was positioned as a Buddhist saint as the "head of Japanese Buddhism". During the Kamakura period (1185–1333), the iconography of Prince Shotoku in his "Śrīmālādevī Siṃhanāda Sūtra Praise" (depicting Shotoku Taishi at the age of 45) became a standardized image of him wearing a sumac-dyed robe, kesa, crown and crown. According to Takeda's speculation, the crown was originally designed by a painter who did not know how to wear the crown to exaggerate the supreme virtue of the crowned prince. For example, the "Mandala of the Holy Emperor" in the Hōryū-ji collection depicts Prince Shotoku, Emperor Yōmei (the father of the Prince), and Emperor Shōmu (the reincarnation of the Prince). Shōmu (reincarnation of Emperor Shōmu), but only Prince Shotoku wears a crown on top of his crown, emphasizing his supreme superiority over the emperor. According to Takeda, this work may also have been painted with reference to the image of Prince Shotoku.

Hyofuji Hiroki also agrees with Takeda's theory, saying that, considering the fact that Go-Daigo copied the "Shitennoji Enki" (The Origin of Shitennoji Temple), which is said to be in the handwriting of Prince Shotoku himself, from a calligraphic work in the collection of National Treasure (Japan), Shitennō-ji, it is certain that Go-Daigo believed in Prince Shotoku as an ideal king, superimposing himself on the "worldly and supreme Buddhist" Prince Shotoku.

=== Kesa ===
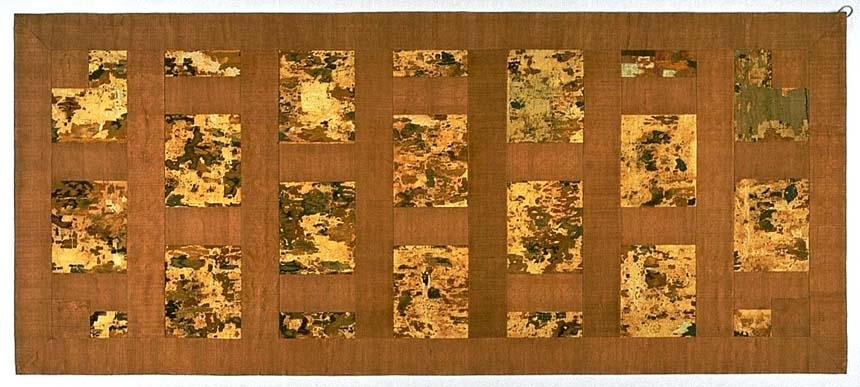
National Treasure: "Kesa of Buddhism's Threads" (8th century). It is recorded that Emperor Go-Daigo actually wore this kesa in the scene depicted in the painting, but the design differs because the artist was unable to refer to the original when he painted it.

The Kesa shown in the image is the National Treasure, the "Kesa of Buddhism.

However, the actual kesa depicted in the painting is different from the actual "Buddhism thread kesa" because the strips are painted with a series of floral patterns. The kesa in the image is a nine-jointed kesa, with the stripes painted in greenish blue and lined with vermilion chrysanthemums . However, Hideo Kuroda claims that it appears to be a shichijo kesa, and points out that the kesa used by the great ajari in the Go-Shichichi Goshuho is also a shichijo kesa . Keiichi Uchida has said that since this work was painted in Yoshino, it was not possible to use the actual kesa in Tō-ji as a reference, and therefore it is possible that another kesa was copied.

The Threaded Kesa is said to have been given by Huiguo, an esoteric Buddhist monk of the Qinglong Temple (Xi'an) in the Tang dynasty capital Chang'an, to his disciple Kūkai (Kobo-Daishi). It is said that Huiguo, an esoteric Buddhist monk, gave this kesa to his disciple Kūkai (Kobo-Daishi). It appears in many records such as "Kobo-Daishi Shinrai Mokuroku", "Toho-ki", and "Yowa 2-nengo 7-nichi Goshuho-ki", and was regarded as a rare and precious treasure at Tō-ji. Restoration work was carried out by successive emperors, and according to the "Second Buddhist Treasure" in the Tō-ji Records, the first restoration was carried out in the second year of Ninji (1241) by order of Emperor Shijō, and the second by Go-Daigo's father, Emperor Go-Uda had this kesa repaired when he received the Dharma transmission from Zensuke of Ninna-ji in the third year of Tokuji (1308).

However, on June 25, Karyaku 4 (1329), thieves entered To-ji Temple and stole many temple treasures, including this kesa ("Ato Documents", "Toho-ki") . When the bandits tore off only the back silk, they threw away the kesa around the temple, which was discovered on July 1 ("Toho-ki") . Therefore, the third restoration work was carried out under the direction of Emperor Go-Daigo (Toho-ki).

Emperor Go-Daigo did not use the "Kesa of Buddhism Threads" when he received the Dharma transmission from Bunguan. However, he wore it in the Yu-Gi-Kan (the scene in the image) held the year after the repair.Uchida speculates that Go-Daigo's enthusiasm for the Yu-gi Kampo can be felt in the way he wears the same kesa as his father, and that he must have been deeply moved when he and his son were able to wear the jewel, which is usually only allowed to be worn by the chief priests of Toji Temple.

The artist, Bunkan himself, is not depicted in the painting because he is the one who gives the perfusion, but he is also wearing the legendary kesa (robe) handed down from generation to generation at Toji..

=== Sanja-takusen ===
On the upper part of the screen, the name of the deity, Sanja-takusen, is written in ink on a strip of white paper and pasted. -In the center is "Amaterasu," on the left is "Kasuga Daimyojin," and on the right is "Hachiman Daibosatsu.

According to popular belief, of the three gods, Amaterasu of Ise Grand Shrine represents honesty, Kasuga Daimyojin of Kasuga-taisha represents compassion, and Iwashimizu Hachimangū presides over purity, and the Emperor, Kuge (Fujiwara), Buke (Seiwa Genji), and is the ancestral deity of .

From the correspondence with the three lions on the ritual tablet, Kuroda Hideo suggested that the three oracles were not affixed later, but from the beginning. In particular, he focused on the Goddess Amaterasu, and said that since the home (Buddhist body) of Amaterasu is Vairocana, the first founder of Shingon, the fact that Go-Daigo, who imitates the second founder Vajrasattva, is seated under Vairocana suggests that the flow from Vairocana to Vajrasattva and from Amaterasu to Emperor Go-Daigo is the same. With this, it is unclear whether it was the last wish of Godaigo himself, but at least the author, Bunkan, claimed that Godaigo is positioned at the center of royal law, Buddhism, and Shintoism.

Takumi Sumitani argued that the three lions of the Sanja oracle and the gap may symbolize the three sacred vessels.

Keiichi Uchida speculates as to whether or not these oracles were affixed from the very beginning of the temple's establishment, that they may have been added at some point after the 57th Keiichi Uchida speculates as to whether or not these oracles were affixed from the very beginning of the temple's establishment, that they may have been added at some point after the 57th anniversary of the opening of the temple, when silk was added to the curtain to enhance its spirituality. However, he said he could not be sure because he had not inspected the actual product.

Motohiko Toyama says that the oracle was affixed at the time of its establishment . According to Toyama, the strips of oracles represent the three gods themselves, and in the image, they are identified with Emperor Go-Daigo, which may indicate that Go-Daigo was an object of worship equal to the gods and Buddha . And that is why A-shaped lion and Un-shaped lion are depicted on the right and left sides of the lower part of the image, respectively, facing each other . Toyama also said that within the Amida-honoring Tokishu sect, it appears that the Amaterasu in this work was worshipped as Vairocana, the Hachiman-daibosatsu as Amitābha, and the Kasuga-daimyojin as Amida's assistant, the Amitabha snare Kannon (#Post-formation history).

Yasurō Abe has suggested that it may be related to the esoteric philosophy of "Sanzon Gyoho," which was popularized by Bunkanbo Kōshin . The "Three Noble Truths Act" literally means that three noble entities (Buddhas, Bodhisattvas, and other high-ranking beings) are combined to perform the practice (prayer). From a Buddhist philosophical point of view, it is a transcendence of "nonduality" , but from an artistic point of view, it is a creative idea that can be depicted by intertwining three symbols instead of two, thus increasing its depth and breadth This is the quintessential example of Bunkan's outstanding abilities as both a scholarly monk and a painter . In fact, in his scholarly work, "The Last Notification Law" (Koyasan Kongo Sammaein, deposited in the Koyasan University library), Bunkan speaks of the gods "Amaterasu, Hachiman, and Kasuga" in the context of the Sanzon Gyoho. According to Abe, this work may be one of the greatest achievements of Bunkan, who arrived at the idea of the Tripitaka as an academic monk, and expressed it in painting as a painter.

If we compare the arrangement of the three oracles with that of the same three oracles from the Northern and Southern Dynasties (private collection, exhibited in Nara National Museum, "Shinto-Buddhist Practices"), we can assume that the current one is identical, unchanged from the time of its formation. However, from the appearance of the copy, it appears that at the time of the copy's establishment (March 21, Eishō14 (1517)), the left and right oracles were temporarily switched. As of 2014, the details of whether this was an illusion due to repairs or some other intentional reason, and when the original arrangement was restored, are unknown.

== Post-creation history ==
The "Gokantō Sōshō Tōgi" in the "Genealogy of the Twelfth Sonkan Shonin" gives the history of this work after its establishment. According to this, after Bunkan, the first thing he did was to become the head of the Daigo-ji Temple, Prince Ippin Fukasho. According to Honchō kōin jōunroku, he was the son of Prince Tsuneaki, the son of Emperor Kameyama, and another cousin from Emperor Go-Daigo. and then in the hands of Nippin Akihito, who was also considered to be the head of Daigoji. However, since they are not mentioned in the "Daigoji Shinyoroku" and other documents, Keiichi Uchida speculates that the two were the heads of Daigoji of the Southern Dynasty, as the Northern Dynasty had its own head of Daigoji and the Southern Dynasty had its own head of Daigoji at that time .

Thereafter, on August 1, Oei3 (1396), four years after the unification of the Northern and Southern Dynasties, it is said that the temple was handed over to the 12th Yugyo Shonin (head of Tokimune), Sonkan According to the "Genealogy of the Twelfth Sonkan Shonin," Sonkan was the son of Prince Tsuneaki, the prince of Emperor Kameyama (the grandfather of Go-Daigo), who was the younger brother of the aforementioned Fukakatsu and another cousin of Go-Daigo . It is not clear why the Shingon treasure was given to the Tokishu, as there is no written reason for this, but Uchida speculates that it was feared that it would be inconvenient for the treasure to go to Kyoto after the unification of the Northern and Southern Dynasties, and that is why it was given to Sonkan, a priest of the Tokishu and a member of the former Southern Dynasty imperial family. .

In fact, Takamitsu became an itinerant priest in the fourth year of the Genchū/first year of the Kakei reign (1387), when the civil war between the Northern and Southern Dynasties had not yet been settled. In the same year, he had an audience with Emperor Go-Komatsu at the Kyoto Imperial Palace, which reportedly led to successive Yougyo Shonin of Tokishu being able to freely attend the palace as a member of the Nancho school . However, although Yuanhao Toyama is rather positive about whether Sonkan was really a member of the Southern Court imperial family, he points out that the "Tokimune Historical Records" use the Northern Court genset rather than the Southern Court genset for the period in question, and that further scrutiny is necessary. Nevertheless, on April 3, 1416, the fourth shogun, Ashikaga Yoshimochi, ordered The Protector to grant Tokimune the freedom to pass through the barrier ("Seijokoji Medieval Documents"), and there is still a draft of the Gokusho, which indicates that Tokimune at that time was Muromachi shogunate, and it is certain that Tokishu at that time was regarded as a prestigious sect by the Muromachi shogunate and received its patronage. According to Toyama, the prosperity of Toki-shu and its contact with the former Nancho led the former Nancho forces to pass it on to Sonkan.

About 120 years later, in the Sengoku period, on March 21, Eishō14 (1517), a copy of the statue, "Shihon Choshoku Go-Daigo Gōzo," was produced. At that time, it was revered as an object of worship by the Tokishu. There are traces of separate paper pasted on both sides of the screen, which is thought to have originated from the fact that the emperor was worshipped with a silk curtain (zejo). The work itself is so sublime and awe-inspiring that a copy was made and worshipped instead, a practice that can also be seen in the Kumano Seido-zu used in the Tokishu's year-end Betsudoki Nenbutsu-kai (Buddhist memorial service). The reason why this work was considered important by the Tokishu appears to be that, in Buddhist studies, Amaterasu corresponds to Vairocana, Hachiman-daibosatsu to Amitābha, the main object of worship of the Tokishu, and Kasuga-daimyojin to Amitābha's assistant, Amoghapasa Kannon . Furthermore, through the fact that Sonkan, the founder of the Tokishu sect, was a relative of Go-Daigo, a scheme was established in which Tokishu = Sonkan Shonin = Emperor Go-Daigo = Amaterasu = Vairocana, which is thought to have become the object of worship for the entire sect.

Later, in the 33rd year of Meiji (1900), April 7, Gazette No. 5026, Home Ministry Notification No. 32 Official Gazette, No. 5026, it was designated as a National Treasure (Type C, Painting) at that time and later as Important Cultural Property by .

== The Image of Emperor Godaigo in Paperback ==
A copy of this work is Emperor Godaigo's Image in Paperback . Sengoku period, established on March 21, Eishō14 (1517) . The author is Amitabha Buddha, a monk who held the position of Sanryo (the fourth of the six "main ranks" in Tokishu) at the time of the Shogunate's 23rd Yugyo Shonin. Later, he is thought to be the same person as a high priest of the same name who served the 25th Buddha Tien as one of the six dormitory priests (the highest rank of the "main dormitory") ("Jishu Jishu Jishu").

The difference in coloration is noticeable at first glance, but the dimensions are almost identical and the outlines are faithfully reproduced in detail.

As for the three shrine oracles at the top of the screen, "Kasuga-daimyojin" and "Hachiman-daibosatsu" have been switched from the original, and it is unclear whether this was intentional or whether the original had some misinterpretations at the time due to repair work . In addition, unlike the "Amaterasu" in the original, the "Amaterasu" is "Amaterasu Ootaijin", which matches the "Tai" in the "Amaterasu Ootaijingu" of the Sanja oracle that Seikouji has in its collection separately from the original . The character for "god" is also different from the original, with a dot . The reasons for these changes in the Sansha Oracle are not detailed as of 2014 .

For the fact that imitations were used in worship rituals instead of the treasured originals, see #Coming after the establishment.

According to the director of the Shōjōkō-ji Yougyo-ji Museum of Treasures, Toyama Motohiro, he discovered the copy while he was organizing the museum's archives. Later, in Heisei 21 (2009), it was exhibited for the first time at the Byodoin Museum Hosho-kan in Byōdō-in, in a special exhibition entitled "Commemoration of the 670th Anniversary of the Transfer of Emperor Go-Daigo's Throne: ACCESSORIES OF THE UNSHARENED TIME". Initially, Toyama had assumed that the painting was an example from the Azuchi-Momoyama or Edo periods based on the impression of the coloring, but restoration work in 2012 uncovered a production record on the back of this paper, which revealed the aforementioned date of formation and artist.

== Kingship theory ==
=== A Different Kind of Royalty ===
In the 1960s, Japanese historian Shin'ichi Sato regarded Emperor Go-Daigo as an idealistic despot who aimed for "imperial universalism" (a system in which everything is decided by the emperor's private decrees) and a Song dynasty emperor-type dictatorship . and his ideals were frustrated by the establishment of the Miscellaneous Appeals Tribunal, which limited the power of the emperor, and the Kenmu regime of Godaigo was viewed negatively as a regime that left nothing for posterity, which quickly collapsed due to a series of reckless policies

Sato's theory of a dictatorial monarch was developed by folk studies and Japanese historian Yoshihiko Amino in his book "Variant forms of kingship" (1986) . Amino likened Emperor Godaigo to Adolf Hitler and called him a "deformed" emperor . Amino also called Go-Daigo's priest, Bunkan, a "deformed" priest and regarded him as a martial demon monk . Fumikan used unusual prayers and spells, and in his capacity as a Shingon Risshu, he commanded an unorthodox army consisting of the lower classes of the time, and contributed to the defeat of Go-Daigo. Amino partially admits that Go-Daigo's grandfather, Emperor Kameyama, and his father, Emperor Go-Uda, were also active in the promotion of esoteric Buddhism, and that Go-Daigo's devotion to esoteric Buddhism was partly due to his father's influence. On the other hand, he says that Go-Uta's practice was orthodox, while Go-Daigo's practice was heretical in opposition to his father's, and that the emperor himself prayed for the surrender of the shogunate .

Amino interpreted this work as a symbolic image of Go-Daigo's deformity, depicting the emperor wearing a Buddhist uniform and praying to curse the samurai government. Regarding the prayer method, he said that the prayer performed by Go-Daigo in the first year of Gentoku (1329) was the "Shoten-su" (Great Sage Joyous Heaven bath oil offering), and that the Great Sage Joyous Heaven was represented by a statue of a man and a woman embracing a human head. . And he said, "To put it another way, it may be said that Godaigo here was trying to make the power of the deepest nature of human beings – sex itself – the power of his own royal authority. , and this is the emperor who is suitable for the king who is the center of "different kinds of different forms".

Later, in 1993, the painting historian Kuroda Hideo conducted a detailed analysis of this work, and said that it was not a figure that prayed or cursed, but was seen as a symbol of the unification of royal law, Buddhism, and Shintoism . On the other hand, as for the stance of evaluation, he followed the Amino theory and regarded the figure as "deformed" .

=== Royal decree of sanctity ===
The question of regarding Emperor Go-Daigo as an idealistic dictatorial monarch or a deformed emperor was first raised by the field of legal history research. From 1988 to 1992, Ichizawa Tetsu examined court cases in the western part of Japan at the end of the Kamakura period and said that as the imperial court of the Kamakura period worked to reform the litigation system, the number of cases in which urban nobles relied on the ruler as a mediator in court gradually grew He said that the centralization of power policy promoted by Emperor Go-Daigo was not based on Go-Daigo's personal character and thought, but rather an extension of the concentration of power of the "ruler of heaven" through the reform of the court's litigation system, and that Go-Daigo was responding to the demands of the times. Then, in 1998, Yoshira Ito rejected Sato Shin'ichi's theory of "imperial universalism" (the principle that everything is decided by the Emperor's private commands) . The term "imperial decree universalism" is said to have only appeared that way because Go-Daigo issued a large number of imperial decrees as a stopgap temporary measure at a time when no organization was in place immediately after the end of the Genkō War. He also said that it was the Miscellaneous Appeals and Decisions Office which Sato defined as the "setbacks of the new regime," that could be seen as the completion of the Kemmu regime as governance through impersonal institutions. Ichizawa and Ito's theory has drawn attention since the beginning of the 21st century, and the reevaluation of Godaigo began in the 2000s. It is said systems of the Kamakura, Kemmu, and Muromachi periods, and in the 2010s, Godaigo was evaluated as a realistic and excellent policy-maker in the Kemmu government.

In addition, from 2006 to 2010, Buddhist art researcher Keiichi Uchida said that Emperor Go-Daigo cannot be called an aberration in terms of Buddhist beliefs. The "Shoten Ku" prayer, which Amino considered heretical and connected to this work, was actually a prayer for "breath of life" (the power of Buddha to calm illnesses and natural disasters), and had no dubious meaning.In the explanation of Shoten Ku, the phrase "to dispel grudges" is sometimes used, but it is a common phrase in Shingon esoteric Buddhism to pray for good health by dispelling grudges, so it cannot be considered as a curse on the Shogunate.

Uchida also showed that the scene in this work is the "Yu-gi Kantou," the highest sacred Kantou (ordination ceremony) of the Shingon sect at the time, using the Seijokoji Record ("Genealogy of the Twelfth Sonkan Shonin"), the Yu-gi Dento Sho, and the Tohoki. Although there is no other example of a secular emperor receiving the Yu Gion Puja, he had steadily built up a career as a monk that was sufficient to receive it, and the process was not unique. He also said that he was not a heretic in the emperor's family, but rather inherited the religious policies of his father, as he used the treasures of his father's emperor, Emperor Go-Uda, to carry out this ceremony. In addition, Yoshihiko Amino, who advocated the heteronormative theory, criticized Godaigo for being more interested in religion than his father. According to Uchida, the facts are the opposite. Go-Daigo is said to be a more moderate esoteric practitioner than his father, while Go-Uta had been secluding himself in the inner sanctum of Koyasan and taking disciples as a monk. He also rejected the theory of the martial sorcerer Bunkan, who was the son of Go-Daigo, on the grounds that he was a virtuous monk and an excellent scholar and painter.

In 2018, "Taiheiki" scholar Hyofuji Hiroki also supported Uchida's results and strongly opposed the view of Go-Daigo as a deformed king and Bunkan as a deformed monk. Of the current "Taihei-ki", especially in Volumes 1, 12 and 13, it is presumed that there are falsifications from the first draft of the "Taihei-ki" with the intention of criticizing the Kemmu regime, and there is a tendency to slander even the personalities of Go-Daigo and Bunkan by bending the facts, and the idea of a different type of kingship is a false image rooted in these falsifications. Hyodo said that there was nothing strange about the emperor's clothing in this image, and that Go-Daigo's father, Go-Uta, had received the Dharma Sangha before he was ordained and practiced the Dharma as a celestial sovereign.

Hyodo said that what is distinctive about this image is not so much the vestments, but the part of the head with both the normal crown and the crown. Sachiko Takeda said this is seen as an imitation of Prince Shotoku, who was regarded as a supreme being in both the sacred and secular realms at the time (#Taishi faith).According to a biography by his political rival, Emperor Hanazono (June 25, Genheng 4, "Hanazono-tennin-ki"), Go-Uta, the father of Go-Daigo, was a wise and powerful monarch and a patron of Shingon esoteric Buddhism, but he became too devoted to Shingon esoteric Buddhism and neglected politics after he became ordained in his later years. According to Hyodo's speculation, in response to his father, Go-Daigo took Prince Shotoku as his role model. He thought that the ideal image of a champion was Prince Shotoku, who was a patron of Buddhism but stayed in the secular world to maintain a balance between politics and Buddhism.
