= 1331 =

1331 in various calendars
- Gregorian calendar: 1331; MCCCXXXI
- Ab urbe condita: 2084
- Armenian calendar: 780; ԹՎ ՉՁ
- Assyrian calendar: 6081
- Balinese saka calendar: 1252–1253
- Bengali calendar: 737–738
- Berber calendar: 2281
- English Regnal year: 4 Edw. 3 – 5 Edw. 3
- Buddhist calendar: 1875
- Burmese calendar: 693
- Byzantine calendar: 6839–6840
- Chinese calendar: 庚午年 (Metal Horse); 4028 or 3821 — to — 辛未年 (Metal Goat); 4029 or 3822
- Coptic calendar: 1047–1048
- Discordian calendar: 2497
- Ethiopian calendar: 1323–1324
- Hebrew calendar: 5091–5092
- Hindu calendars
- Vikram Samvat: 1387–1388
- Shaka Samvat: 1252–1253
- Kali Yuga: 4431–4432
- Holocene calendar: 11331
- Igbo calendar: 331–332
- Iranian calendar: 709–710
- Islamic calendar: 731–732
- Japanese calendar: Gentoku 3 / Genkō 1 (元弘元年)
- Javanese calendar: 1243–1244
- Julian calendar: 1331; MCCCXXXI
- Korean calendar: 3664
- Minguo calendar: 581 before ROC 民前581年
- Nanakshahi calendar: −137
- Thai solar calendar: 1873–1874
- Tibetan calendar: ལྕགས་ཕོ་རྟ་ལོ་ (male Iron-Horse); 1457 or 1076 or 304 — to — ལྕགས་མོ་ལུག་ལོ་ (female Iron-Sheep); 1458 or 1077 or 305

Year 1331 (MCCCXXXI) was a common year starting on Tuesday of the Julian calendar.

== Events ==
=== September–December ===
- September 8 – Stefan Dušan declares himself king of Serbia.
- September 27 – Battle of Płowce: The German Teutonic Knights and the Poles battle to a draw.
- October 22 – Kōgon became emperor of northern Japan.

=== Date unknown ===
- The Sieges of Cividale del Friuli and Alicante begin.
- The Genkō War begins in Japan.
- Ibn Battuta visits Kilwa.
- The first recorded outbreak of the Black Death occurs, in the Chinese province of Hebei.

== Births ==
- February 16 – Coluccio Salutati, Florentine political leader (d. 1406)
- April 14 – Jeanne-Marie de Maille, French Roman Catholic saint (b. 1414)
- April 30 – Gaston III of Foix (d. 1391)
- October 4 – James Butler, 2nd Earl of Ormonde (d. 1382)
- date unknown
  - Hamidüddin Aksarayî, Ottoman teacher of Islam (d. 1412)
  - Blanche d'Évreux, queen consort of France (d. 1398)
  - Michael Palaiologos, Byzantine prince
- probable – Salvestro de' Medici, provost of Florence (d. 1388)

== Deaths ==
- January 14 – Odoric of Pordenone, Italian missionary friar and explorer (b. c. 1280)
- April 17 – Robert de Vere, 6th Earl of Oxford, English noble and soldier (b. c. 1257)
- May 12 – Engelbert of Admont, abbot in Styria
- October 27 – Abulfeda, Kurdish Syrian historian and geographer (b. 1273)
- November 11 – King Stefan Uroš III Dečanski of Serbia (b. c. 1285)
- December 26 – Philip I, Prince of Taranto, titular Latin Emperor (b. 1278)
- December 30 – Bernard Gui, French inquisitor (b. 1261 or 1262)
- date unknown – Matilda of Hainaut, Princess of Achaea (b. 1293)
