= 1329 =

1329 in various calendars
- Gregorian calendar: 1329; MCCCXXIX
- Ab urbe condita: 2082
- Armenian calendar: 778; ԹՎ ՉՀԸ
- Assyrian calendar: 6079
- Balinese saka calendar: 1250–1251
- Bengali calendar: 735–736
- Berber calendar: 2279
- English Regnal year: 2 Edw. 3 – 3 Edw. 3
- Buddhist calendar: 1873
- Burmese calendar: 691
- Byzantine calendar: 6837–6838
- Chinese calendar: 戊辰年 (Earth Dragon); 4026 or 3819 — to — 己巳年 (Earth Snake); 4027 or 3820
- Coptic calendar: 1045–1046
- Discordian calendar: 2495
- Ethiopian calendar: 1321–1322
- Hebrew calendar: 5089–5090
- Hindu calendars
- Vikram Samvat: 1385–1386
- Shaka Samvat: 1250–1251
- Kali Yuga: 4429–4430
- Holocene calendar: 11329
- Igbo calendar: 329–330
- Iranian calendar: 707–708
- Islamic calendar: 729–730
- Japanese calendar: Karyaku 4 / Gentoku 1 (元徳元年)
- Javanese calendar: 1241–1242
- Julian calendar: 1329; MCCCXXIX
- Korean calendar: 3662
- Minguo calendar: 583 before ROC 民前583年
- Nanakshahi calendar: −139
- Thai solar calendar: 1871–1872
- Tibetan calendar: ས་ཕོ་འབྲུག་ལོ་ (male Earth-Dragon); 1455 or 1074 or 302 — to — ས་མོ་སྦྲུལ་ལོ་ (female Earth-Snake); 1456 or 1075 or 303

Year 1329 (MCCCXXIX) was a common year starting on Sunday of the Julian calendar.

== Events ==
=== January–December ===
- February 1 – King John of Bohemia (of the Teutonic Order) captures Medvėgalis, an important fortress of the pagan Grand Duchy of Lithuania, and baptizes 6,000 of its defenders.
- February 18 – Amda Seyon I, Emperor of Ethiopia, begins his campaigns in the southern Muslim provinces (possibly in 1332).
- March 27 – Pope John XXII issues a bull condemning some teachings of Meister Eckhart (who died last year) as heretical.
- April – Antipope Nicholas V is excommunicated by Pope John XXII.
- June 6 – Edward III of England pays homage to Philip VI of France for Aquitaine.
- June 7 – David II becomes King of Scots at age 5; he will rule Scotland for nearly 42 years.
- June 10 – Braganstown massacre, County Louth, Ireland: Over 160 are killed.
- June 11 – Battle of Maltepe (Pelekanon): Ottoman Turks defeat the Byzantine Empire.
- August 4 – Wittelsbach possessions are divided by the Treaty of Pavia into those of the Bavarian line and those of Palatinate line. Both lines will be reunited in 1777.

=== Date unknown ===
- Aimone of Savoy becomes Count of Savoy.
- Construction begins on the Archcathedral Basilica of the Assumption of the Blessed Virgin Mary and Saint Andrew in Frombork, Poland.
- Michael of Cesena is deposed as General of the Franciscans.
- Stefan Uroš IV Dušan of Serbia defeats Stephen II, Ban of Bosnia.
- Wiesbaden is granted the right of coinage by Louis IV, Holy Roman Emperor.

== Births ==
- September 26 – Anne of Bavaria, queen consort of Bohemia (d. 1353)
- November 22 – Elisabeth of Meissen, Burgravine consort of Nuremberg (d. 1375)
- November 29 – John I, Duke of Bavaria (d. 1340)
- date unknown
  - Fairuzabadi, Persian Arab lexicographer (d. 1414)
  - Prince Lazar of Serbia (d. 1389)
  - Philip II, Prince of Taranto (d. 1374)
  - Hosokawa Yoriyuki, Japanese samurai (d. 1392)

== Deaths ==
- January 17 – Saint Roseline, Carthusian nun (b. 1263)
- April 21 – Frederick IV, Duke of Lorraine (b. 1282)
- May 9 – John Drokensford, Bishop of Bath and Wells
- May 31 – Albertino Mussato, Italian statesman and writer (b. 1261)
- June 7 – Robert the Bruce, King of Scotland (b. 1274)
- August 30 – Khutughtu Khan, Emperor Mingzong of Yuan, emperor of the Yuan dynasty and the Mongol Empire (b. 1300)
- October 27 – Mahaut, Countess of Artois (b. 1268)
- date unknown
  - Walter Herok, Bishop of Aberdeen
  - Michael of Imereti
  - Oshin of Korikos, regent of Armenia (assassinated)
  - Edward, Count of Savoy (b. 1284)
  - Maol Íosa IV, Earl of Strathearn
