= Shōkyō =

Period of Japanese history (1332–1333)

Shōkyō (正慶; also pronounced "Shōkei") was a brief initial Japanese era of the Northern Court during the Kamakura period, after Gentoku and before Kenmu, lasting from April 1332 to April 1333. The reigning Emperors were Emperor Go-Daigo in the south and Emperor Kōgon in the north.

== Nanboku-chō overview ==
The Imperial seats during the Nanboku-chō period were in relatively close proximity, but geographically distinct. They were conventionally identified as: Northern capital: Kyoto; Southern capital: Yoshino.

During the Meiji period, an Imperial decree dated March 3, 1911 established that the legitimate reigning monarchs of this period were the direct descendants of Emperor Go-Daigo through Emperor Go-Murakami, whose Southern Court had been established in exile in Yoshino, near Nara.

Until the end of the Edo period, the militarily superior pretender-Emperors supported by the Ashikaga shogunate had been mistakenly incorporated in Imperial chronologies despite the undisputed fact that the Imperial Regalia were not in their possession.

This illegitimate Northern Court had been established in Kyoto by Ashikaga Takauji.

== Change of era ==
- 1332 Shōkyō gannen (正慶元年): The era name was changed to Shōkyō to mark an event or a number of events. The previous era ended and a new one commenced in Genkō 2, the 10th month.

In this time frame, Genkō (1331–1333) was the Southern Court equivalent nengō.

== Notes ==
Preceded by Gentoku	Era or nengō Shōkyō; 1332–1333	Succeeded by Kenmu
