= Prince Moriyoshi =

Military ruler of Japan in 1333

Prince Moriyoshi 護良親王
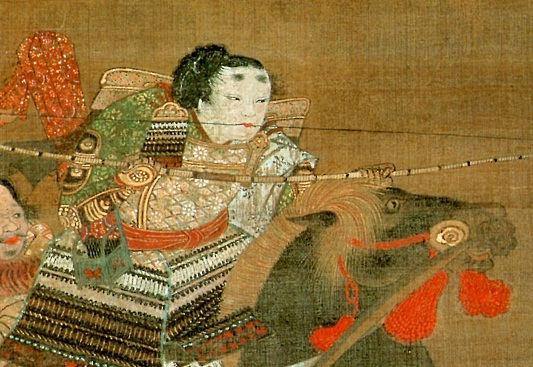

Shōgun
- In office: 1333
- Predecessor: Prince Morikuni
- Successor: Prince Narinaga

Head Priest of Enryaku-ji Temple
- In office: 1327–1329
- Predecessor: Prince Jidō
- Successor: Kanshu
- In office: 1329–1330
- Predecessor: Kanshu
- Successor: Jigen
- Born: 12 August 1308
- Died: 12 August 1335 (aged 27); Kamakura, Japan
- Spouse: daughter of Kitabatake Chikafusa
- Issue: Prince Okiyoshi
- Father: Emperor Go-Daigo
- Mother: Minamoto no Chikako
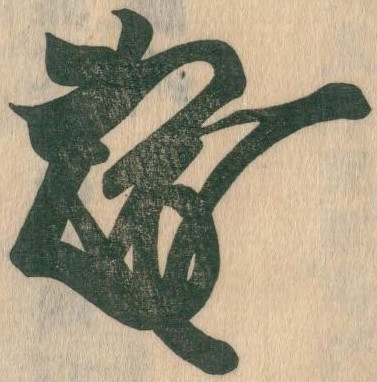
- Signature

Prince Moriyoshi (護良親王, Moriyoshi Shinnō) (Note: Also called Prince Morinaga (spelled the same) or Imperial Prince of the Great Pagoda (大塔宮, Prince Ōtōnomiya)) (1308 – August 12, 1335) was a Japanese prince, military leader and monk.

== Life ==
He was the son of Emperor Go-Daigo and his consort Minamoto no Chikako.

Moriyoshi was named by his father as the head abbot of the Enryaku-ji temple on Mount Hiei.

Go-Daigo attempted to seize power in 1331 during the Genkō War. Prince Moriyoshi joined forces with Kusunoki Masashige. Moriyoshi tenaciously defended Mount Yoshino. Masashige's heroics defending Chihaya, together with Moriyoshi's efforts to rally troops, brought a large number of warriors to the loyalist cause. By 1333, the rival warlords Ashikaga Takauji and Nitta Yoshisada had both joined the cause; Yoshisada would lay siege to Kamakura in the same year. When the city finally fell, Regent Hōjō Takatoki fled to Tōshō temple, where he and his entire family committed suicide. This marked the end of Hōjō power.

Restored to the throne, Go-Daigo started the Kenmu Restoration. After refusing to appoint Ashikaga Takauji to the post of sei-i taishōgun, Go-Daigo gave it to Prince Morinaga instead. Go-Daigo made the double mistake of giving the title to his sons Moriyoshi and Norinaga, two civilians, thus alienating Takauji and the warrior class, who felt he, as a military man and a descendant of the Minamoto clan, should have been shōgun instead.

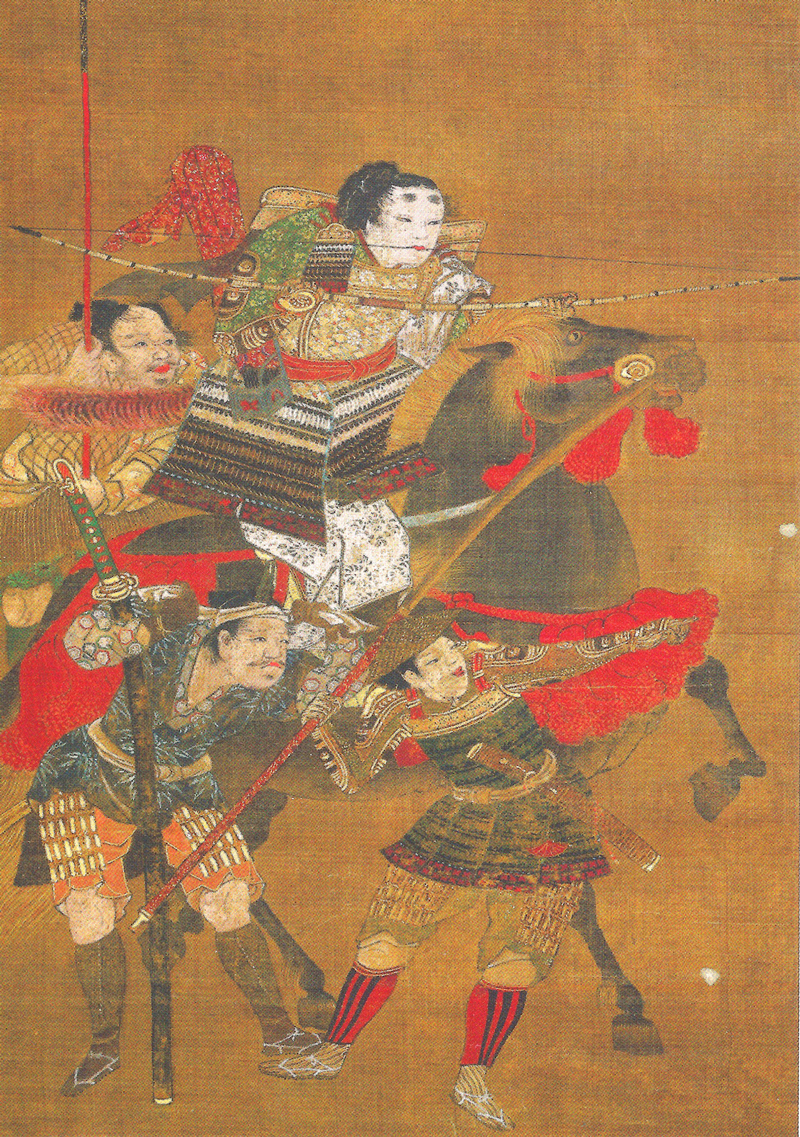
picture of Prince Moriyoshi

Takauji seized Moriyoshi in Yoshino "on imperial warrant", after rumors attributed to Go-Daigo's consort Renshi, that he was preparing an attack. Moriyoshi was then sent to Takauji's brother Ashikaga Tadayoshi in Kamakura. Tadayoshi had Moriyoshi beheaded in late August 1335.

Morinaga's wife Princess Hinaturu and his vassal took back Morinaga's head to Yamanashi. Morinaga's head was buried at the base of the katsura tree at Fujisan-Simomiya-Omuro-Sengen-Shrine.

A Shinto shrine, Kamakura-gū, was built around the cave where Prince Moriyoshi was imprisoned. It was dedicated to him by Emperor Meiji in 1869.

== Family ==
- Father: Emperor Go-Daigo
- Mother: Minamoto no Chikako
- Wife: daughter of Kitabatake Moronaga
- Child: Prince Okinaga (b. 1326)

== See also ==
- Kamakura-gū
- Myōhō–ji
