= Hōkō-ji (Shizuoka) =

Buddhist temple in Shizuoka Prefecture, Japan

Hōkō-ji 方広寺
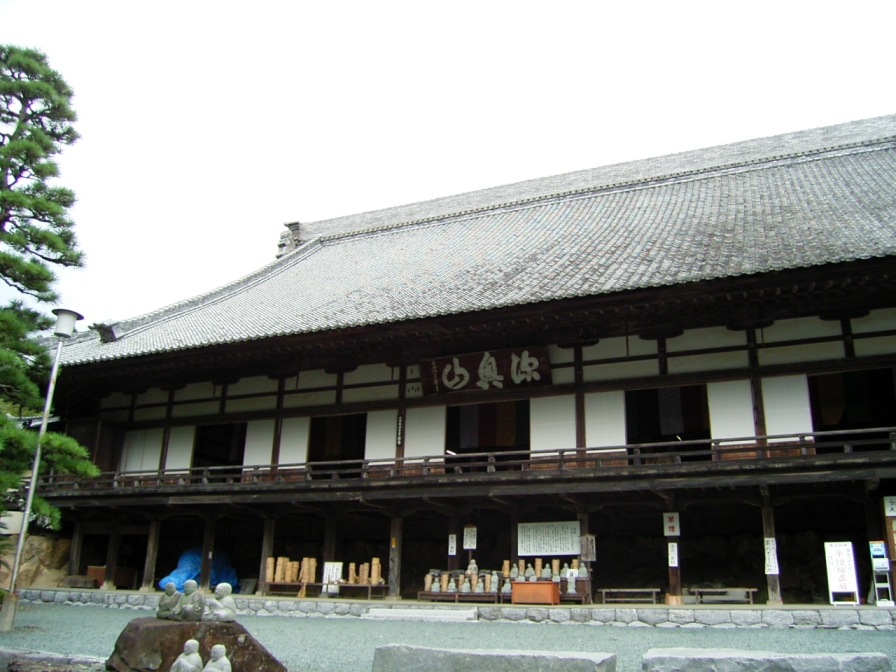
- Main Hall

Religion
- Affiliation: Hōkō-ji Rinzai
- Deity: Shaka Nyorai (Śākyamuni)
- Status: Head Temple

Location
- Location: 1577-1 Okuyama, Inasa-Chō, Hamamatsu, Shizuoka Prefecture
- Country: Japan
- Interactive map of Hōkō-ji 方広寺
- Coordinates: 34°50′54.5″N 137°36′50.3″E

Architecture
- Founder: Okuyama Tomofuji and Mumon Gensen
- Completed: 1371

Website
- http://www.houkouji.or.jp/

Hōkō-ji (方広寺) is a Buddhist temple near Hamamatsu, Shizuoka Prefecture that dates from the 14th century.

Mumon Gensen (son of Emperor Go-Daigo) founded the temple in 1371. Since 1903, Hōkō-ji has been the main temple of the Hōkō-ji sect of the Rinzai school of Buddhism.
