= Emperor Go-Daigo =

Emperor of Japan from 1318 to 1339

Emperor Go-Daigo 後醍醐天皇
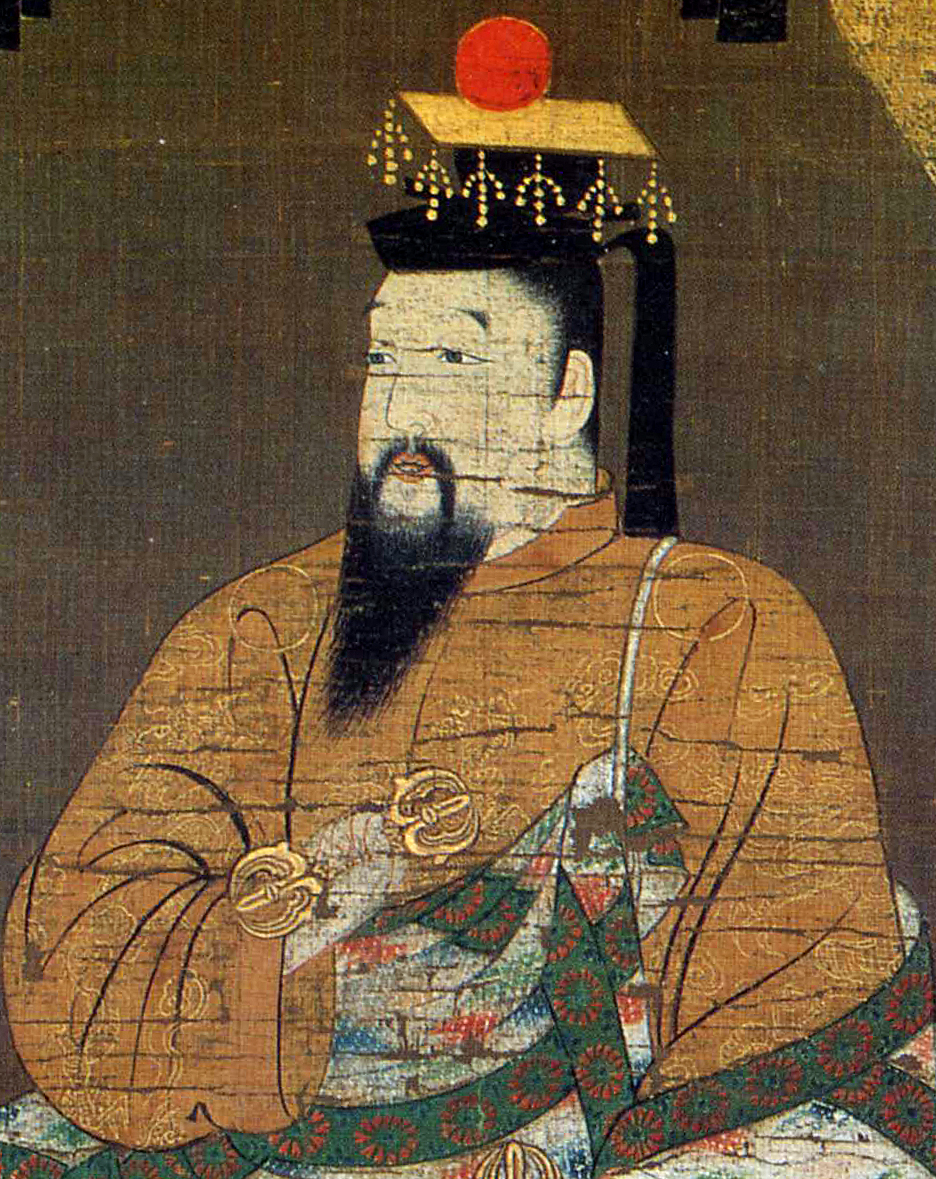
- Silken Painting of Emperor Go-Daigo, 1339

Emperor of Japan
- Reign: 29 March 1318 – 18 September 1339
- Enthronement: 30 April 1318
- Predecessor: Hanazono
- Successor: Go-Murakami; Kōgon (pretender)
- Shōgun: Prince Morikuni; Prince Moriyoshi; Prince Narinaga; Ashikaga Takauji
- Born: 26 November 1288; Heian-kyō, Kamakura shogunate
- Died: 19 September 1339 (aged 50); Yoshino no Angū (Nara), Ashikaga shogunate
- Burial: Tō-no-o no misasagi (塔尾陵) (Nara)
- Spouse: Saionji Kishi; Junshi
- Issue among others...: Prince Moriyoshi; Prince Takanaga; Prince Munenaga; Prince Tsunenaga; Prince Narinaga; Emperor Go-Murakami; Prince Kaneyoshi
Posthumous name
- Tsuigō: Emperor Go-Daigo (後醍醐院 or 後醍醐天皇)
- House: Imperial House of Japan
- Father: Emperor Go-Uda
- Mother: Fujiwara no Chūshi
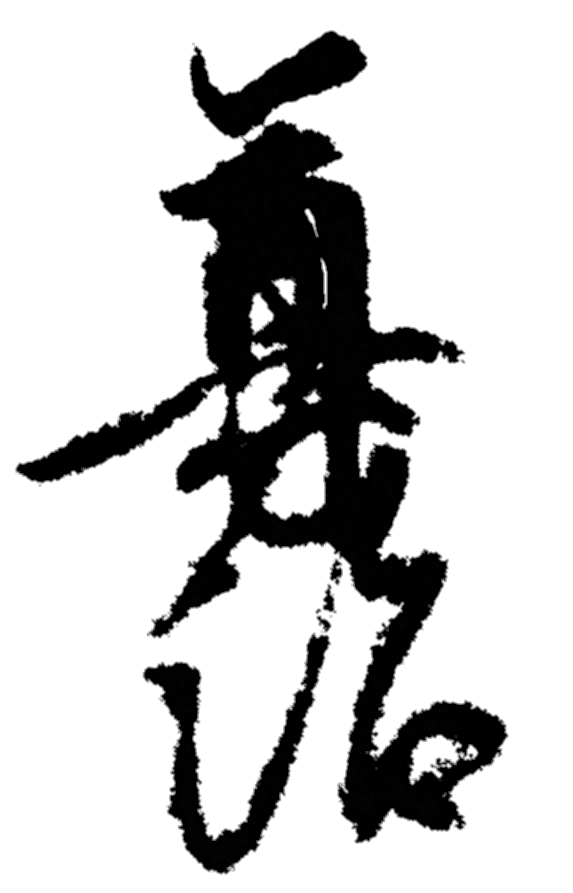
- Signature

Emperor Go-Daigo (後醍醐天皇 Go-Daigo-tennō) (26 November 1288 – 19 September 1339) was the 96th emperor of Japan, according to the traditional order of succession. He successfully overthrew the Kamakura shogunate in 1333 and established the short-lived Kenmu Restoration to bring the Imperial House back into power. This was to be the last time the emperor had real power until the Meiji Restoration in 1868. The Kenmu restoration was in turn overthrown by Ashikaga Takauji in 1336, ushering in the Ashikaga shogunate. The overthrow split the imperial family into two opposing factions between the Ashikaga backed Northern Court situated in Kyoto and the Southern Court based in Yoshino. The Southern Court was led by Go-Daigo and his later successors.

== Biography ==
Before his ascension to the Chrysanthemum Throne, his personal name (imina) was Takaharu-shinnō (尊治親王).

He was the second son of the Daikakuji-tō emperor, Emperor Go-Uda. His mother was Fujiwara no Chūshi/Tadako (藤原忠子), daughter of Fujiwara no Tadatsugu (Itsutsuji Tadatsugu) (藤原忠継/五辻忠継). She became Nyoin taking the name Dantenmon-in (談天門院). His older brother was Emperor Go-Nijō.

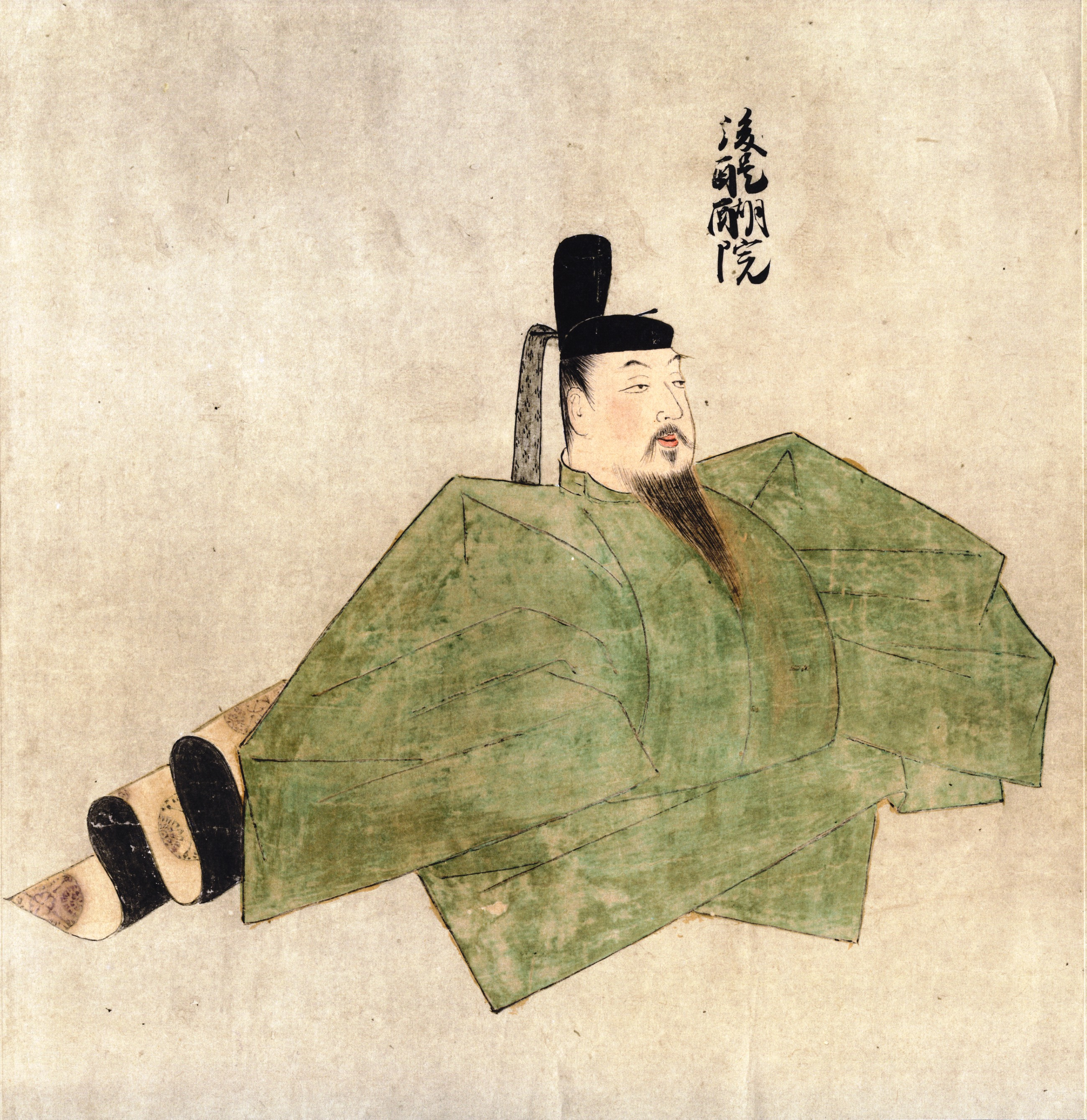
Emperor Go-Daigo portrait in Tennō Sekkan Daijin Eizukan.

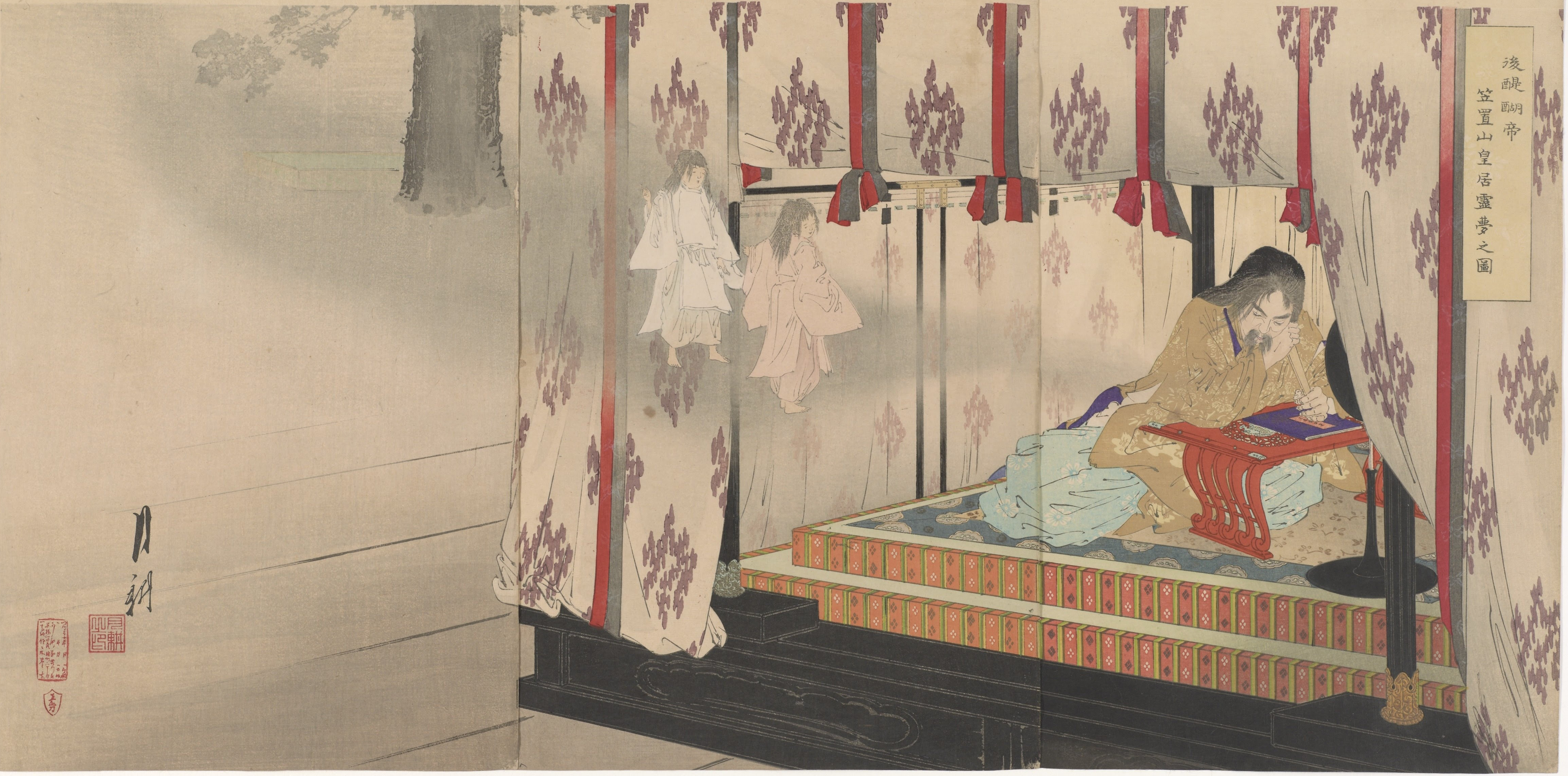
Woodblock print triptych by Ogata Gekkō; Emperor Go-Daigo dreams of ghosts at his palace in Kasagiyama

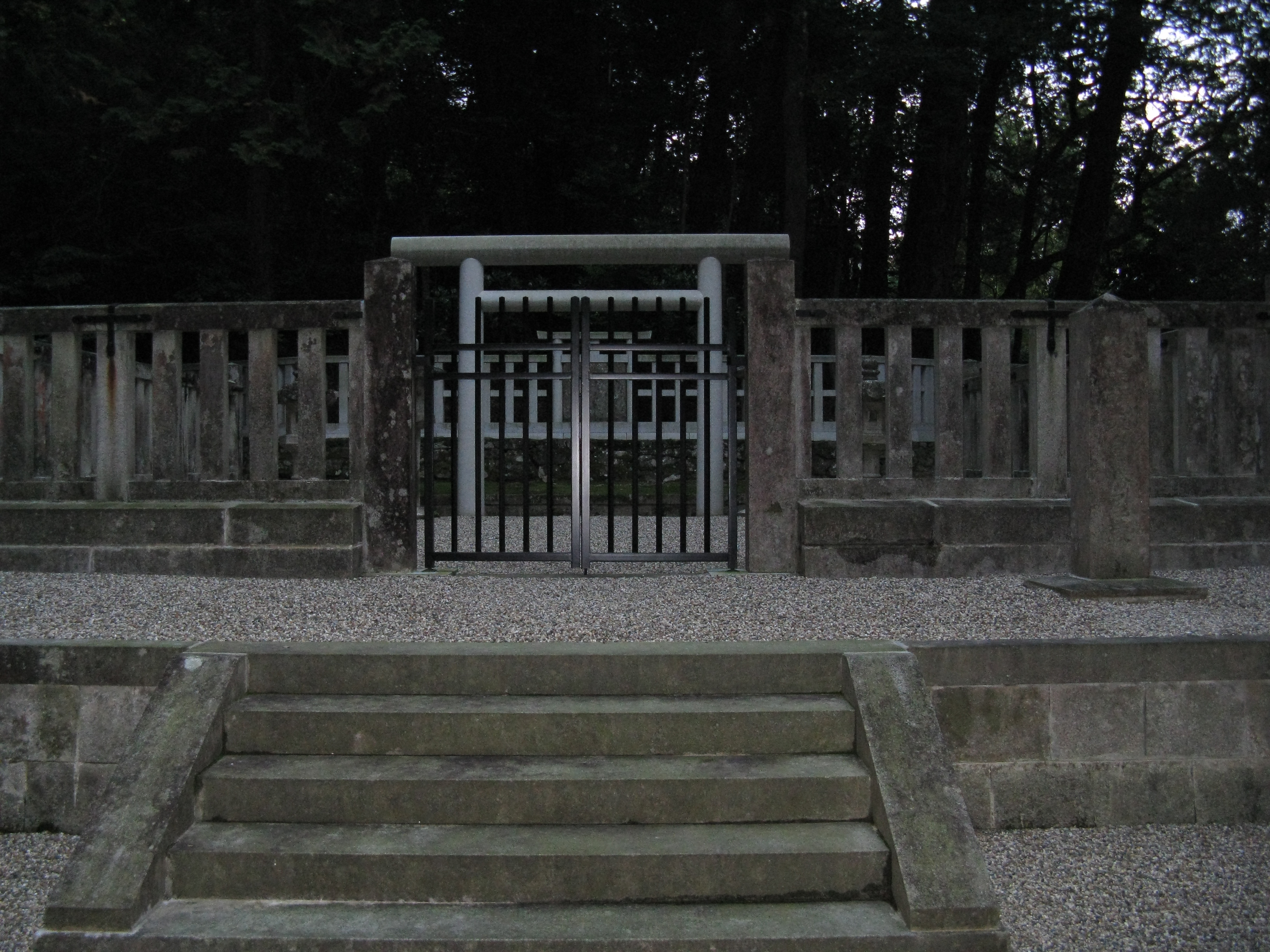
Memorial Shinto shrine and mausoleum honoring Emperor Go-Daigo
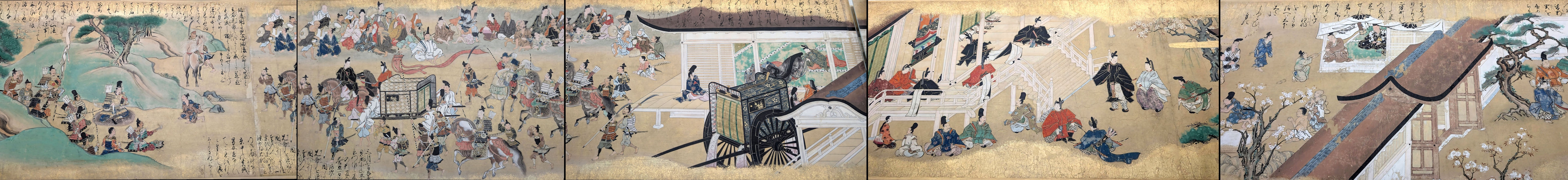
Taiheiki Emaki (Illustrated Scroll of the Chronicle of Great Peace), Volume 2: From right to left: "Officials receiving a petition," "Court officials gathering in front of Emperor Go-Daigo," "Empress Saionji Kishi worrying about the imprisoned Emperor," "Emperor Go-Daigo being exiled to Oki," "Kojima Takanori attempting to rescue Emperor Go-Daigo" (Collection of the Saitama Prefectural Museum of History and Folklore).

Emperor Go-Daigo's ideal was the Engi era (901–923) during the reign of Emperor Daigo, a period of direct imperial rule. An emperor's posthumous name was normally chosen after his death, but Emperor Go-Daigo chose his personally during his lifetime, to share it with Emperor Daigo.

=== Events of Go-Daigo's life ===
- 1308 (Enkyō 1): At the death of Emperor Go-Nijō, Hanazono accedes to the Chrysanthemum Throne at age 12 years; and Takaharu-shinnō, the second son of former-Emperor Go-Uda is elevated as Crown Prince and heir apparent under the direction of the Kamakura shogunate.
- 29 March 1318 (Bunpō 2, 26th day of 2nd month): In the 11th year of Hanazono's reign (花園天皇十一年), the emperor abdicated; and the succession (senso) was received by his cousin, the second son of former-Emperor Go-Uda. Shortly thereafter, Emperor Go-Daigo is said to have acceded to the throne (sokui).
- 1319 (Bunpō 3, 4th month): Emperor Go-Daigo caused the nengō to be changed to Gen'ō to mark the beginning of his reign.

In 1324, with the discovery of Emperor Go-Daigo's plans to overthrow the Kamakura shogunate, the Rokuhara Tandai disposed of his close associate Hino Suketomo in the Shōchū Incident.

In the Genkō Incident of 1331, Emperor Go-Daigo's plans were again discovered, this time by a betrayal by his close associate Yoshida Sadafusa. He quickly hid the Sacred Treasures in a secluded castle in Kasagiyama (the modern town of Kasagi, Sōraku District, Kyōto Prefecture) and raised an army, but the castle fell to the shogunate's army the following year, and they enthroned Emperor Kōgon, exiling Daigo to Oki Province (the Oki Islands in modern-day Shimane Prefecture), the same place to which Emperor Go-Toba had been exiled after the Jōkyū War of 1221.

In 1333, Emperor Go-Daigo escaped from Oki with the help of Nawa Nagatoshi and his family, raising an army at Senjo Mountain in Hōki Province (the modern town of Kotoura in Tōhaku District, Tottori Prefecture). Ashikaga Takauji, who had been sent by the shogunate to find and destroy this army, sided with the emperor and captured the Rokuhara Tandai. Immediately following this, Nitta Yoshisada, who had raised an army in the east, laid siege to Kamakura. When the city finally fell to Nitta, Hōjō Takatoki, the shogunal regent, fled to Tōshō temple, where he and his entire family committed suicide. This ended Hōjō power and paved the way for the upcoming Ashikaga shogunate.

Upon his triumphal return to Kyoto, Daigo took the throne from Emperor Kōgon and began the Kenmu Restoration. Impatient reforms, litigation over land rights, rewards, and the exclusion of the samurai from the political order caused much complaining, and his political order began to fall apart. In 1335, Ashikaga Takauji, who had travelled to eastern Japan without obtaining an imperial edict in order to suppress the Nakasendai Rebellion, became disaffected. Daigo ordered Nitta Yoshisada to track down and destroy Ashikaga. Ashikaga defeated Nitta Yoshisada at the Battle of Takenoshita, Hakone. Kusunoki Masashige and Kitabatake Akiie, in communication with Kyoto, smashed the Ashikaga army. Takauji fled to Kyūshū, but the following year, after reassembling his army, he again approached Kyōto. Kusunoki Masashige proposed a reconciliation with Takauji to the emperor, but Go-Daigo rejected this. He ordered Masashige and Yoshisada to destroy Takauji. Kusunoki's army was defeated at the Battle of Minatogawa.

When Ashikaga's army entered Kyōto, Emperor Go-Daigo resisted, fleeing to Mount Hiei, but seeking reconciliation, he sent the imperial regalia to the Ashikaga side. Takauji enthroned the Jimyōin-tō emperor, Kōmyō, and officially began his shogunate with the enactment of the Kenmu Law Code.

Go-Daigo escaped from the capital in January 1337, the regalia that he had handed over to the Ashikaga being counterfeit, and set up the Southern Court among the mountains of Yoshino, beginning the Period of Northern and Southern Courts in which the Northern Dynasty in Kyoto and the Southern Dynasty in Yoshino faced off against each other.

Emperor Go-Daigo ordered Imperial Prince Kaneyoshi to Kyūshū and Nitta Yoshisada and Imperial Prince Tsuneyoshi to Hokuriku, and so forth, dispatching his sons all over, so that they could oppose the Northern Court.

- 18 September 1339 (Ryakuō 2, 15th day of the 8th month): In the 21st year of Go-Daigo's reign, the emperor abdicated at Yoshino in favor of his son, Noriyoshi-shinnō, who would become Emperor Go-Murakami.
- 19 September 1339 (Ryakuō 2, 16th day of the 8th month): Go-Daigo died;

The actual site of Go-Daigo's grave is settled. This emperor is traditionally venerated at a memorial Shinto shrine (misasagi) at Nara.

The Imperial Household Agency designates this location as Go-Daigo's mausoleum. It is formally named Tō-no-o no misasagi.

== Genealogy ==
=== Consorts and children ===
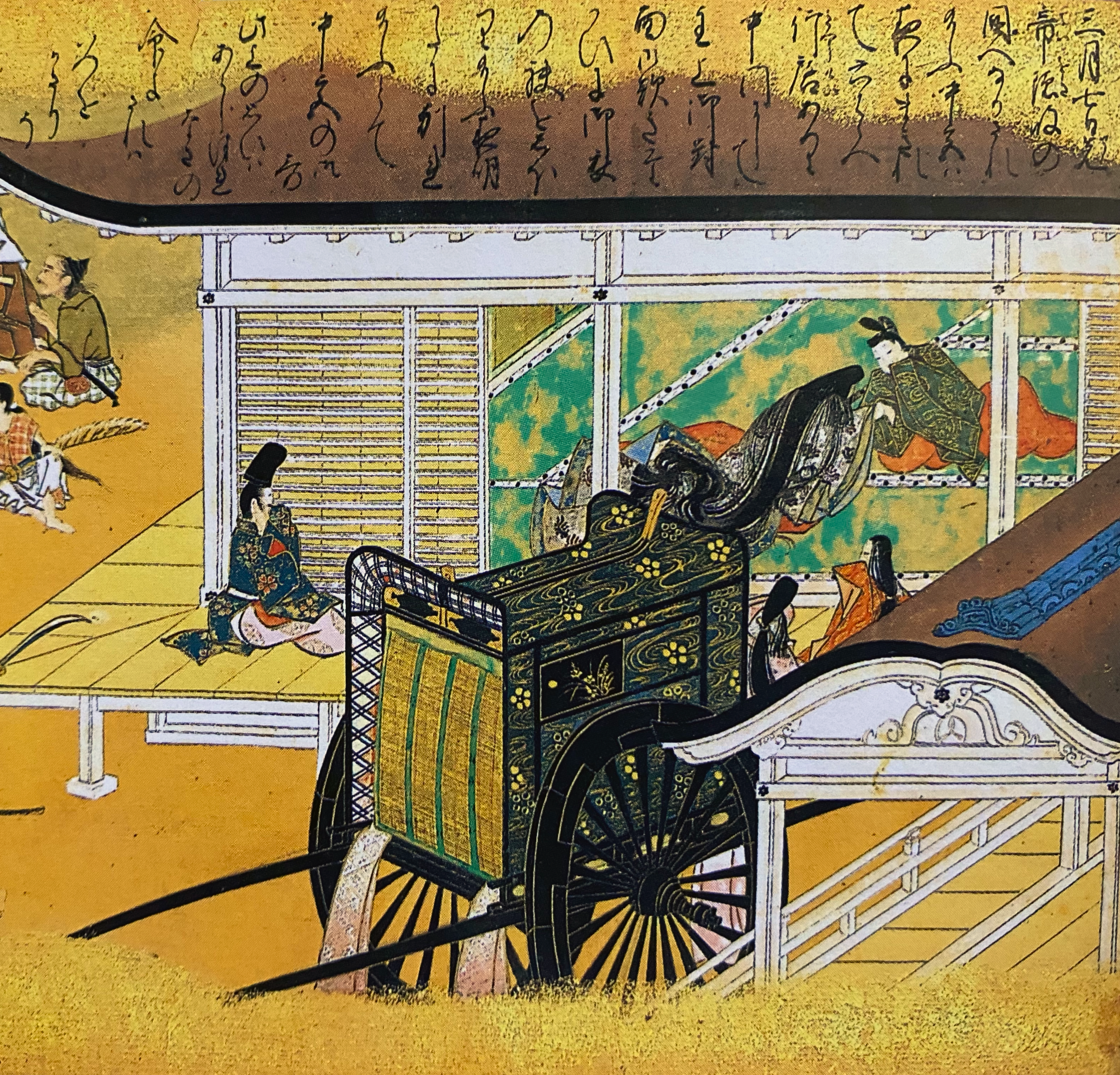
Empress Kishi and Emperor Go-Daigo. From Taiheiki Emaki (c. 17th century), vol. 2, On the Lamentation of the Empress. Owned by Saitama Prefectural Museum of History and Folklore.

- Empress (Chūgū): Saionji Kishi (西園寺禧子) later Empress Dowager Go-Kyōgoku-in (後京極院), Saionji Sanekane's daughter
  - Princess (b. 1314)
  - Second Daughter: Imperial Princess Kanshi (懽子内親王, 1315–1362) later Empress Dowager Senseimon-in (宣政門院), Saiō at Ise Shrine; later, married to Emperor Kōgon
- Empress (Chūgū): Imperial Princess Junshi (珣子内親王) later Empress Dowager Shin-Muromachi-in (新室町院), Emperor Go-Fushimi's daughter
  - Imperial Princess Sachiko (幸子内親王, b. 1335)
- Nyōgo: Fujiwara no Eishi (藤原栄子) also Anfuku-dono (安福殿), Nijō Michihira's daughter
- Court lady: Fujiwara no Chikako (藤原親子) also Chūnagon-tenji (中納言典侍), Itsutsuji Munechika's daughter
  - Eleventh Son: Imperial Prince Mitsuyoshi (満良親王)
- Lady-in-waiting: Dainagon'nosuke, Kitabatake Moroshige's daughter
- Lady-in-waiting: Shin-Ansatsu-tenji (新按察典侍), Jimyoin Yasufuji's daughter
- Lady-in-waiting: Sochi-no-suke (帥典侍讃岐)
- Court lady: Koto no Naishi (勾当内侍), Saionji Tsunafusa's daughter
  - Princess
- Court lady: Shōshō no Naishi (少将内侍), Sugawara no Arinaka's daughter
  - Imperial Prince Seijo (聖助法親王) – Head Priest of Onjō-ji
- Court lady: Fujiwara (Ano) no Renshi (藤原廉子/阿野廉子) later Empress Dowager Shin-Taikenmon-in (新待賢門院, 1301–1359), Ano Kinkado's daughter
  - Imperial Prince Tsunenaga (also Tsuneyoshi) (恒良親王)
  - Imperial Prince Nariyoshi (also Narinaga) (成良親王)
  - Imperial Prince Noriyoshi (義良親王) later become Emperor Go-Murakami
  - Imperial Princess Shoshi (祥子内親王) – Saiō at Ise Shrine 1333–1336; later, nun in Hōan-ji
  - Imperial Princess Ishi (惟子内親王) – nun in Imabayashi
  - Speculated - Imperial Princess Noriko (憲子内親王) later Empress Dowager Shinsenyō-mon-in (新宣陽門院)
- Court lady: Minamoto no Chikako (源親子), Kitabatake Morochika's daughter
  - Imperial Prince Moriyoshi (or Morinaga) (護良親王) – Head Priest of Enryakuji (Tendai-zasu, 天台座主) (Buddhist name: Prince Son'un, 尊雲法親王)
  - Imperial Prince Kōshō (恒性, 1305–1333) – priest
  - Imperial Princess Hishi (妣子内親王) – nun in Imabayashi
  - princess – married to Konoe Mototsugu (divorced later)
  - Imperial Prince Sonsho (尊性法親王)
- Court lady: Fujiwara no Ishi/Tameko (藤原為子, d. c. 1311–12), Nijō Tameyo's daughter
  - Imperial Prince Takanaga (also Takayoshi) (尊良親王)
  - Imperial Prince Munenaga (also Muneyoshi) (宗良親王) – Head Priest of Enryakuji (Tendai-zasu, 天台座主) (Buddhist name: Prince Sonchō, 尊澄法親王)
  - Imperial Princess Tamako (瓊子内親王, 1316–1339) – nun
  - Princess
- Nyōgo: Fujiwara no Jisshi (実子). Tōin Saneo's daughter
  - Princess
- Court lady: Fujiwara no Shushi/Moriko (藤原守子, 1303–1357), daughter of Tōin Saneyasu (洞院実泰)
  - Imperial Prince Gen'en (玄円法親王, d.1348) – Head Priest of Kōfuku-ji
  - Imperial Prince Saikei (最恵法親王) – priest in Myōhō-in
- Princess: Imperial Princess Kenshi (憙子内親王, 1270–1324) later Empress Dowager Shōkeimon'in (昭慶門院), Emperor Kameyama's daughter
  - Mumon Gensen (無文元選, 1323–1390) – founder of Hōkō-ji (Shizuoka)
- Court lady: Fujiwara (Nijo) Fujiko/Toshi (二条藤子) also Gon-no-Dainagon no Sammi no Tsubone (権大納言三位局, d. 1351) later Reisho-in (霊照院), Nijō Tamemichi's daughter
  - Imperial Prince Hōnin (法仁法親王, 1325–1352) – priest in Ninna-ji
  - Prince Kaneyoshi (also Kanenaga) (懐良親王, 1326–1383) – Seisei Taishōgun (征西大将軍) 1336–?
- Court lady: Ichijō no Tsubone (一条局) later Yūgimon'in (遊義門院), Saionji Sanetoshi's daughter
  - Imperial Prince Tokiyoshi (also Yoyoshi) (世良親王) (c. 1306–8 – 1330)
  - Imperial Prince Jōson (静尊法親王) (Imperial Prince Keison, 恵尊法親王) – priest in Shōgoin (聖護院)
  - Imperial Princess Kinshi (欣子内親王) – nun in Imabayashi
- Court lady: Shōnagon no Naishi (少納言内侍), Shijō Takasuke's daughter
  - Sonshin (尊真) – priest
- Nyōgo: Dainagon-no-tsubone (大納言局), Ogimachi Saneakira's daughter
  - Imperial Princess Naoko (瑜子内親王)
- Nyōgo: Saemon-no-kami-no-tsubone (左衛門督局), Nijō Tametada's daughter
  - Nun in Imabayashi
- Court lady: Gon-no-Chūnagon no Tsubone (権中納言局), Sanjō Kinyasu's daughter
  - Imperial Princess Sadako (貞子内親王)
- Nyōgo: Yoshida Sadafusa's daughter
- Nyōgo: Bōmon-no-tsubone (坊門局), Bomon Kiyotada's daughter
  - Princess (Yōdō?)
- Nyōgo: Horikawa Mototomo's daughter
  - Princess
- Nyōgo: Minamoto-no-Yasuko (源康子) also Asukai-no-tsubone (飛鳥井局) later Enseimon'in Harima (延政門院播磨), Minamoto-no-Yasutoki's daughter
- Nyōgo: Wakamizu-no-tsubone (若水局), Minamoto-no-Yasutoki's daughter
- Nyōgo: Horiguchi Sadayoshi's daughter
  - daughter married Yoshimizu Munemasa
- Court lady: Konoe no Tsubone (近衛局) later Shōkunmon'in (昭訓門院)
  - Prince Tomoyoshi (知良王)
- (unknown women)
  - Yōdō (d. 1398) – 5th Head Nun of Tōkei-ji
  - Rokujō Arifusa's wife
  - Ryusen Ryosai (竜泉令淬, d.1366)
  - Kenkō (賢光)

Go-Daigo had some other princesses from some court ladies.

== Kugyō ==
Kugyō (公卿) is a collective term for the very few most powerful men attached to the court of the Emperor of Japan in pre-Meiji eras. Even during those years in which the court's actual influence outside the palace walls was minimal, the hierarchic organization persisted.

In general, this elite group included only three to four men at a time. These were hereditary courtiers whose experience and background would have brought them to the pinnacle of a life's career. During Go-Daigo's reign, this apex of the Daijō-kan included:

- Kampaku, Nijō Michihira, 1316–1318
- Kampaku, Ichijō Uchitsune, 1318–1323
- Kampaku, Kujō Fusazane, 1323–1324
- Kampaku, Takatsukasa Fuyuhira, 1324–1327
- Kampaku, Nijō Michihira, 1327–1330
- Kampaku, Konoe Tsunetada, 1330
- Kampaku, Takatsukasa Fuyunori, 1330–1333
- Sadaijin
- Udaijin
- Naidaijin
- Dainagon

== Eras of Go-Daigo's reign ==
The years of Go-Daigo's reign are more specifically identified by more than one era name or nengō. Emperor Go-Daigo's eight era name changes are mirrored in number only in the reign of Emperor Go-Hanazono, who also reigned through eight era name changes.

Japanese Imperial kamon — a stylized chrysanthemum blossom

=== Pre-Nanboku-chō court ===
- Bunpō (1317–1319)
- Gen'ō (1319–1321)
- Genkō (1321–1324)
- Shōchū (1324–1326)
- Karyaku (1326–1329)
- Gentoku (1329–1331)
- Genkō (1331–1334)
- Kenmu (1334–1336)
- Eras as reckoned by legitimate sovereign's Court (as determined by Meiji rescript)
  - Engen (1336–1340)
- Eras as reckoned by pretender sovereign's Court (as determined by Meiji rescript)
  - Shōkei (1332–1338)
  - Ryakuō (1338–1342)

== In popular culture ==
Emperor Go-Daigo appears in the alternate history novel Romanitas by Sophia McDougall.

== See also ==
- Emperor of Japan
- List of Emperors of Japan
- Imperial cult
- Yoshimizu Shrine
- Yoshino Shrine

== Notes ==
Regnal titles
Preceded by Emperor Hanazono	Emperor of Japan: Go-Daigo; 1318–1339	Succeeded by Emperor Go-Murakami
Preceded by Emperor Hanazono	Emperor of Japan: Go-Daigo; 1318–1339	Succeeded by Emperor Kōgon (Pretender)
