= Minamoto no Chikako =

Minamoto no Chikako (源親子) was the daughter of Kitabatake Morochika, and Imperial consort to Emperor Go-Daigo. She had earlier been Imperial consort to Go-Daigo's father, Emperor Go-Uda.

She was the mother of Prince Morinaga.
