= Miyata Noboru =

Japanese folklorist

- Born: October 14, 1936; Japan Tokyo
- Died: February 10, 2000 (aged 63)
- Other name: 宮田 登
- Occupation: historian

Miyata Noboru (宮田 登, Miyata Noboru; October 14, 1936 - February 10, 2000) was a Japanese folklorist, and a close collaborator and friend of the historian Amino Yoshihiko.

== Biography ==
He graduated from the department of literature at Tokyo University of Education (now University of Tsukuba) in 1960. He was appointed as an Assistant Lecturer at the Tokyo Gakugei University in 1970, and became full-time professor at the University of Tsukuba in 1980. On his official retirement he took up a professorship at Kanagawa University.

== Works ==
He wrote many books and articles on popular religion and the Emperor system.
