= Genkō (1331–1334) =

Period of Japanese history (1331–1334)

Genkō (元弘) was a Japanese era name (年号, nengō; "year name") of the Southern Court during the Era of Northern and Southern Courts after Gentoku and before Kenmu. This period spanned the years from August 1331 through January 1334. The reigning Emperors were Go-Daigo-tennō (後醍醐天皇) in the south and Kōgon-tennō (光厳天皇) in the north.

== Events of the Genkō era ==
- 1331–1333: The Genkō War (元弘の乱, Genkō no Ran) lasted the entire length of the era, which marked the fall of the Kamakura shogunate and led to the ultimately unsuccessful Kenmu Restoration.

== Northern Court equivalents ==
- Shōkei

== See also ==
- Mongol invasions of Japan

== Notes ==
| Preceded by Gentoku | Era or nengō Genkō; 1331–1334 | Succeeded by Kenmu |
