= Yoshihiko Amino =

Japanese Marxist historian and public intellectual

- 網野 善彦
- Born: January 22, 1928; Yamanashi Prefecture, Japan
- Died: February 27, 2004 (aged 76)
- Occupation(s): Japanese history, folklore

Yoshihiko Amino (Japanese: 網野 善彦, Hepburn: Amino Yoshihiko; January 22, 1928 – February 27, 2004) was a Japanese Marxist historian and public intellectual, perhaps most singularly known for his novel examination of medieval Japanese history.

Although little of Amino's work has been published in the West, Japanese writers and historians of Japan regard Amino as one of the most important Japanese historians of the twentieth century. Some of Amino's findings are now available in English, in a very lively and personal account of how he came to reverse many conventional ideas about Japanese history.

== Early life ==
Born in Yamanashi Prefecture in 1928, Amino received a high school education in Tokyo. Amino studied under the Marxist historian Ishimoda Shō (1912–1986) at the University of Tokyo, where he first became involved in both Marxist historiography and the student movement during the early postwar period.

== Teaching and research ==
Following graduation, Amino taught for several years at the high school level, beginning his career as a university professor at Nagoya University in 1956 as an assistant professor, before taking up a post at Kanagawa University in 1980 as a professor of the university's Junior College and a Kanagawa Research Fellow. In doing so he exchanged a more prestigious teaching position at a national university for the opportunity to devote more energy to research and publication. There, with his colleague, the anthropologist Miyata Noboru (1936–2000), he ran an interdisciplinary seminar at the newly founded Institute for the Study of Japanese Folklore established in 1982. Although Amino continued in his capacity as a writer until his death, he retired from both institutional teaching and research in 1998.

Amino began his career researching the lifestyles of out-of-the way villagers and marginalized non-urbanized Japanese. His scrupulous examination of primary sources enabled him to reconstruct the outlooks of a variety of non-agrarian peasant communities that shared little in common with the image of "the Japanese" constructed by scholarship and nationalist historians. He arrived at the conclusion that medieval Japan was neither a single culturally nor socially integrated state, but rather a mosaic of quite distinct societies, some of which knew nothing, for example, about the Japanese emperor. From these beginnings he undertook, especially in the last three decades of his life, an extensive rewriting of the common orthodoxies about Japanese history and Japanese society, which had exercised a powerful hegemony over academics and their national audience since the Meiji period. In this sense, he became one of the great academic deconstructors of the premises and mythology of the nihonjinron.

== Death ==
Amino died of lung cancer on February 27, 2004, aged 76.

== Legacy and influence ==
A prolific historian, Amino produced a published output of at least 486 known titles–ranging from newspaper and magazine interviews and articles, book reviews, dialogues, round-table discussions, and other publications to several hundred original articles and over twenty books that were either monographs or essay collections and several multiple-volume series on historical and ethnographic themes. Wesleyan University Professor of History William Johnston writes that "a complete introduction to the Amino oeuvre would probably require its own book."

Simultaneously, Johnston writes that

Despite his prolific output and stature in Japan, only a handful of papers and only one book (although even that remains unpublished) by Amino have been translated into English language. As a leading scholar of early modern Japan once told me, everybody talks about Muen, kugai, raku, one of Amino’s most important books, but few have read it. For the most part, one could say the same about much of his work. At least two reasons for this arise from Amino’s work itself. One is that much of it has a highly specialized focus on medieval Japan, and another is the context in which his work is read. Many of his essays and monographs focus like a micro laser on the minutiae of landholding patterns, forms of taxation, local power relations, changes in legal codes, the reading and interpretation of documents, and similar specialized topics, and as a consequence even in Japan only specialists find them compelling reading. And while much of his later work is compelling to a large segment of the Japanese reading public, it is less so to a general audience outside Japan. This is especially true for his work on issues concerning Japanese ethnic origins, the tennø, rice cultivation and consumption, geography, and other topics... Finally, although much of his work would certainly be of interest to students and scholars of Japanese history outside Japan, the shortage of translations remains an obstacle.

As mentioned above, a very readable account of some of Amino's major findings is now available in English.

== Selected works ==
=== Books ===
- 1991: 日本の歴史をよみなおす (Reinterpreting Japanese History). Tokyo: Chikuma Shobo.
- 1990: 日本論の視座――列島の社会と国家 (A New Standpoint on Nihon-ron: Society and the State on the Archipelago). Shogakkukan.
- 1978: 無縁・公界・楽――日本中世の自由と平和 (Muen, Kugai, Raku: Liberty and Peace in Medieval Japan). Heibonsha.
- 1966: 中世荘園の様相 (Conditions on Medieval Estates).

=== Articles ===
- 2007: "Medieval Japanese Constructions of Peace and Liberty: Muen, Kugai, and Raku". International Journal of Asian Studies 4 (1): 3–14.
- 2001: "Commerce and finance in the Middle Ages: The beginnings of ‘capitalism’". Acta Asiatica 81: 1–19.
- 1996: "Emperor, Rice, and Commoners". In Donald Denoon, Mark Hudson, Gavan McCormack, and Tessa Morris-Suzuki, eds. Multicultural Japan: Palaeolithic to Postmodern. Cambridge, UK: Cambridge University Press, 1996: 235–245
- 1995: "Les Japonais et la mer" ("The Japanese and the Sea"). Annales 50 (2): 235–258. (French)
- 1992: "Deconstructing 'Japan'". East Asian History 3: 121–142. Translated by Gavan McCormack, pdf available
- 1983: "Some problems concerning the history of popular life in medieval Japan". Acta Asiatica 44: 77–97.
