= Kenmu Restoration =

Period of Japanese history, 1333–1336

Coordinates: 35°0′N 135°46′E

Kenmu Restoration 建武の新政 Kenmu no shinsei
- 1333–1336
- Imperial Seal
- Capital: Heian-kyō
- Common languages: Late Middle Japanese
- Religion: Shinbutsu-shūgō
- Government: Absolute monarchy
- Emperor
  - 1318–1339: Go-Daigo
- Shōgun
  - 1333: Moriyoshi
  - 1335–1336: Narinaga
- History
  - Genkō War begins: 1333
  - Siege of Kamakura: May 18, 1333
  - Ashikaga Takauji captures Kyoto: February 23 1336
- Currency: Ryō
Preceded by
Kamakura shogunate
Imperial Court in Kyoto
Succeeded by
Ashikaga shogunate
Northern Court
Southern Court

The Kenmu Restoration (Japanese: 建武の新政, Hepburn: Kenmu no shinsei) was a three-year period of Imperial rule in Japanese history between the Kamakura period and the Muromachi period from 1333 to 1336. The Kenmu Restoration was an effort made by Emperor Go-Daigo to overthrow the ruling Kamakura Shogunate (de facto ruled by Hōjō clan) and restore the Imperial House to power in Japan, returning to civilian government after 148 years of de facto military government from Kamakura. Go-Daigo launched the Genkō War in 1331 against the Kamakura Shogunate but was defeated and forced to exile to the Oki Islands. Go-Daigo launched a second uprising, and with the assistance of the defected Kamakura general Ashikaga Takauji and rebel leader Nitta Yoshisada, defeated the Kamakura Shogunate at the siege of Kamakura in 1333. The Imperial House was restored to power but Go-Daigo's policies failed to satisfy his major samurai supporters and most Japanese people. The Kenmu Restoration was ultimately overthrown when Takauji became Shōgun and founded the Ashikaga Shogunate in 1336, beginning the "Northern and Southern Courts" period and the Muromachi period.

The Kenmu Restoration was the last time the Emperor of Japan held significant power until the Meiji Restoration in 1868.

== Background ==
The Emperor's role had been usurped by the Minamoto and Hōjō families ever since Minamoto no Yoritomo had obtained from the Emperor the title of shōgun in 1192, ruling thereafter from Kamakura. For various reasons, the Kamakura shogunate decided to allow two contending imperial lines—known as the Southern Court or junior line, and the Northern Court or senior line—to alternate on the throne. The method worked for several successions until a member of the Southern Court ascended to the throne as Emperor Go-Daigo. Go-Daigo wanted to overthrow the shogunate and openly defied Kamakura by naming his own son his heir. In 1331 the shogunate exiled Go-Daigo but loyalist forces, including Kusunoki Masashige, rebelled and came to his support. They were aided by, among others, future shōgun Ashikaga Takauji, a samurai who had turned against Kamakura when dispatched to put down Go-Daigo's rebellion. At roughly the same time, Nitta Yoshisada, another eastern chieftain, attacked the shogunate's capital. The shogunate tried to resist his advance: Yoshisada and shogunate forces fought several times along the Kamakura Kaidō, for example at Kotesashigahara (小手差原), Kumegawa (久米河) (both near today's Tokorozawa, Saitama Prefecture), and Bubaigawara, in today's Fuchū, ever closer to Kamakura. The city was finally reached, besieged, and taken. Kamakura would remain for one century the political capital of the Kantō region, but its supremacy as political centre was over.

== Objectives of the restoration ==
When Emperor Go-Daigo ascended the throne in 1318, he immediately manifested his intention to rule without interference from the military in Kamakura. Historical documents show that, disregarding evidence to the contrary, he and his advisers believed that a revival of the Imperial House was possible, and that the Kamakura's shogunate was the greatest and most obvious of the obstacles.

Another situation that begged for a solution was the land-ownership problem posed by the manors and their lands (see the article shōen). The great landowners shugo (governors) and jitō (manor's lord), with their political independence and their tax exemptions were impoverishing the government and undermining its authority, and Kitabatake Chikafusa, Go-Daigo's future chief adviser, discussed the situation in his works on succession. Chikafusa admitted that nobody had any intention of abolishing those privileges, so the hope of success on this front was from the beginning clearly very dim. What he planned to replace shugo and jitō with is unclear, but he surely had no intention of sharing power with the samurai class. However serious the land ownership problem, Go-Daigo and his advisers made no serious effort to solve it, partly because it was samurai from the manors in the western provinces that had defeated the shogunate for him. In such a situation, any effort to regulate the manors was bound to cause resentment among key allies.

== Failure of Go-Daigo's policies ==
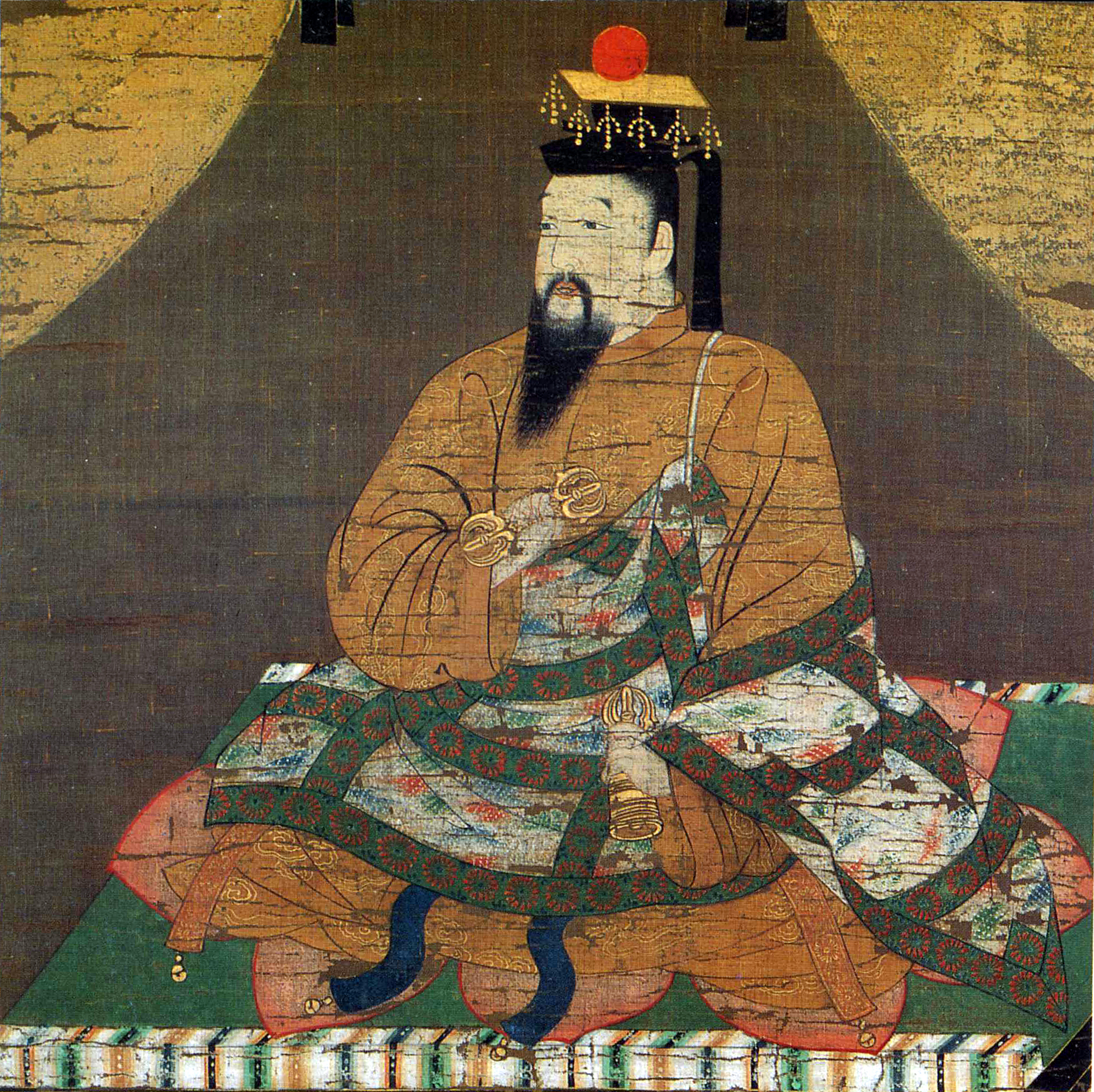
Emperor Go-Daigo

The Emperor reclaimed the property of some manors his family had previously lost control of, rewarding them with, among others, Buddhist temples like Tō-ji and Daitoku-ji in the hope to obtain their support. He however failed to protect the rights of tenants and workers, whose complaints poured into the monasteries.

He did not understand the importance to him of the warrior class either, because he never properly rewarded his minor samurai supporters, as he could have done using lands from the confiscated Hōjō lands, indulging instead in favoritism. These errors are the key to understanding the events of the next few decades. After rewarding religious institutions, he prepared to redistribute Hōjō lands, and samurai came to him in great numbers to lay their claims. The biggest rewards were given to samurai, among them Nitta Yoshisada, the man who had destroyed the Kamakura shogunate, and Ashikaga Takauji. In so doing, however, he failed to return control of the provinces to civilians. But he made his greatest error when he failed to properly reward minor warriors who had supported him. The tribunals set up to the purpose were inefficient and too inexperienced for the task, and corruption was rife. Samurai anger was made worse by the fact that Go-Daigo, wanting to build a palace for himself but having no funds, levied extra taxes from the samurai class. A wave of enmity towards the nobility started to run through the country, growing stronger with time. The Taiheiki also records that, although Takauji and Yoshisada were richly rewarded, the offices of shugo and jito in more than fifty provinces went to nobles and court bureaucrats, leaving no spoils for the warriors. By the end of 1335 the Emperor and the nobility had lost all support of the warrior class.

== Rise of the Ashikaga brothers ==
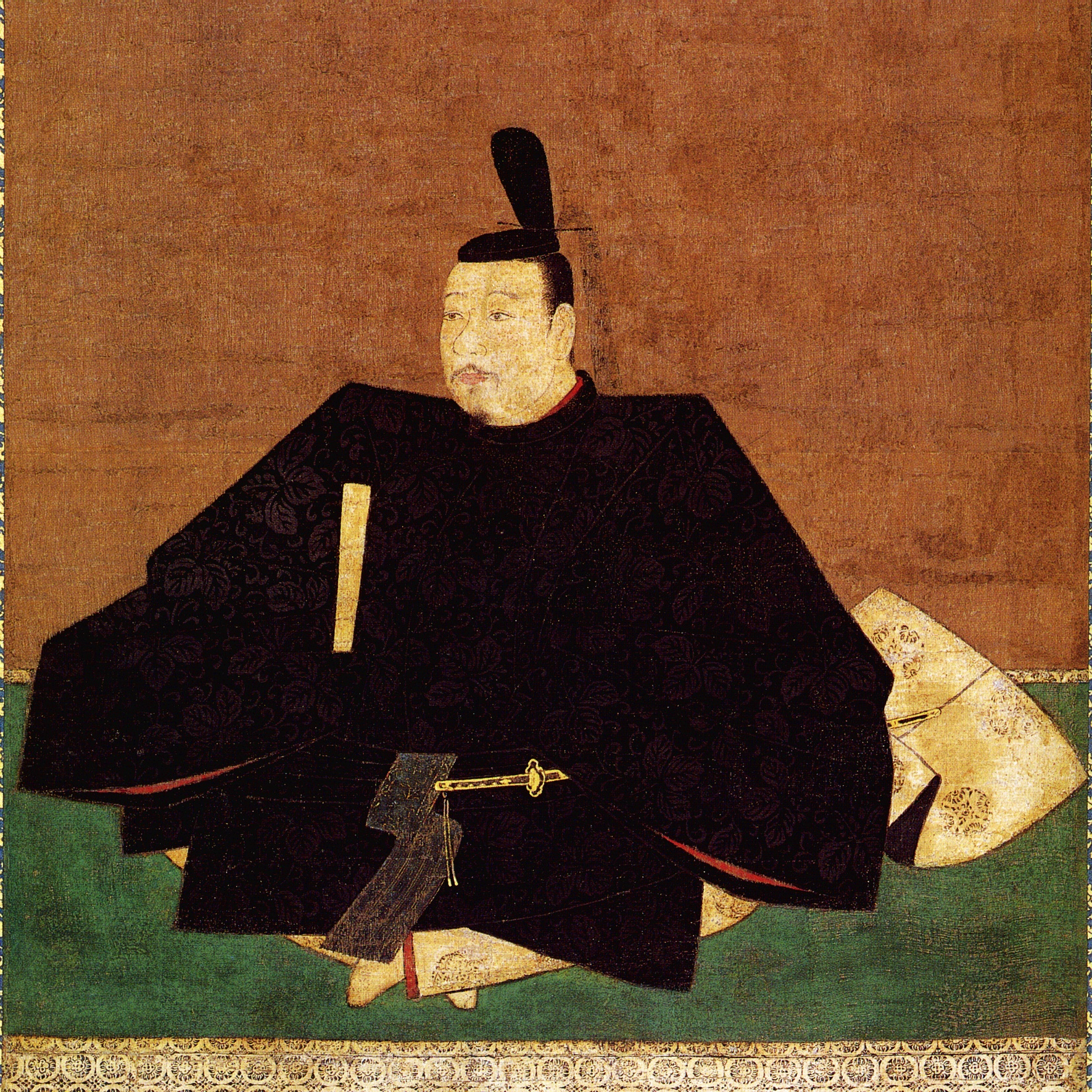
A portrait of Ashikaga Takauji bearing his son Yoshiakira's cipher

Go-Daigo wanted to re-establish his rule in Kamakura and the east of the country without sending a shōgun there, as this was seen as still too dangerous. As a compromise, he sent his six-year-old son Prince Norinaga to Mutsu Province (the eastern part of today's Tōhoku region, stretching from Fukushima Prefecture in the south to Aomori Prefecture in the north) and nominated him Governor-General of the Mutsu and Dewa Provinces. In an obvious reply to this move, Ashikaga Takauji's younger brother Tadayoshi without an order from the Emperor escorted another of his sons, eleven-year-old Nariyoshi (a.k.a. Narinaga) to Kamakura, where he installed him as Governor of the Kōzuke Province with himself as a deputy and de facto ruler. The appointment of a warrior to an important post was intended to show the Emperor that the samurai class was not ready for a purely civilian rule.

Later, a third son of Go-Daigo's, Prince Morinaga, was appointed sei-i taishōgun together with his brother Norinaga, a move that immediately aroused Ashikaga Takauji's hostility. Takauji believed the military class had the right to rule and considered himself not a usurper but, since the Ashikaga descended from a branch of the Minamoto clan, rather a restorer of Minamoto power. When the Hōjō garrison at Rokuhara was destroyed in 1333, he immediately stepped in and installed there his office (bugyōsho). It kept order in the city and in general took over the original's function. Extending its authority to controlling travel along highways, issuing passports and exercising rights previously belonging to the shogunate's deputies (the Rokuhara Tandai), Takauji showed he believed that samurai political power must continue. His setting himself apart as a representative of the military made him an aggregation point for the warriors' discontent. Samurai saw him as the man who could bring back the shogunate's heyday, and therefore his strength was superior to that of any other samurai, Nitta Yoshisada included. His only obstacle to the shogunate was Prince Morinaga.

== Prince Morinaga ==
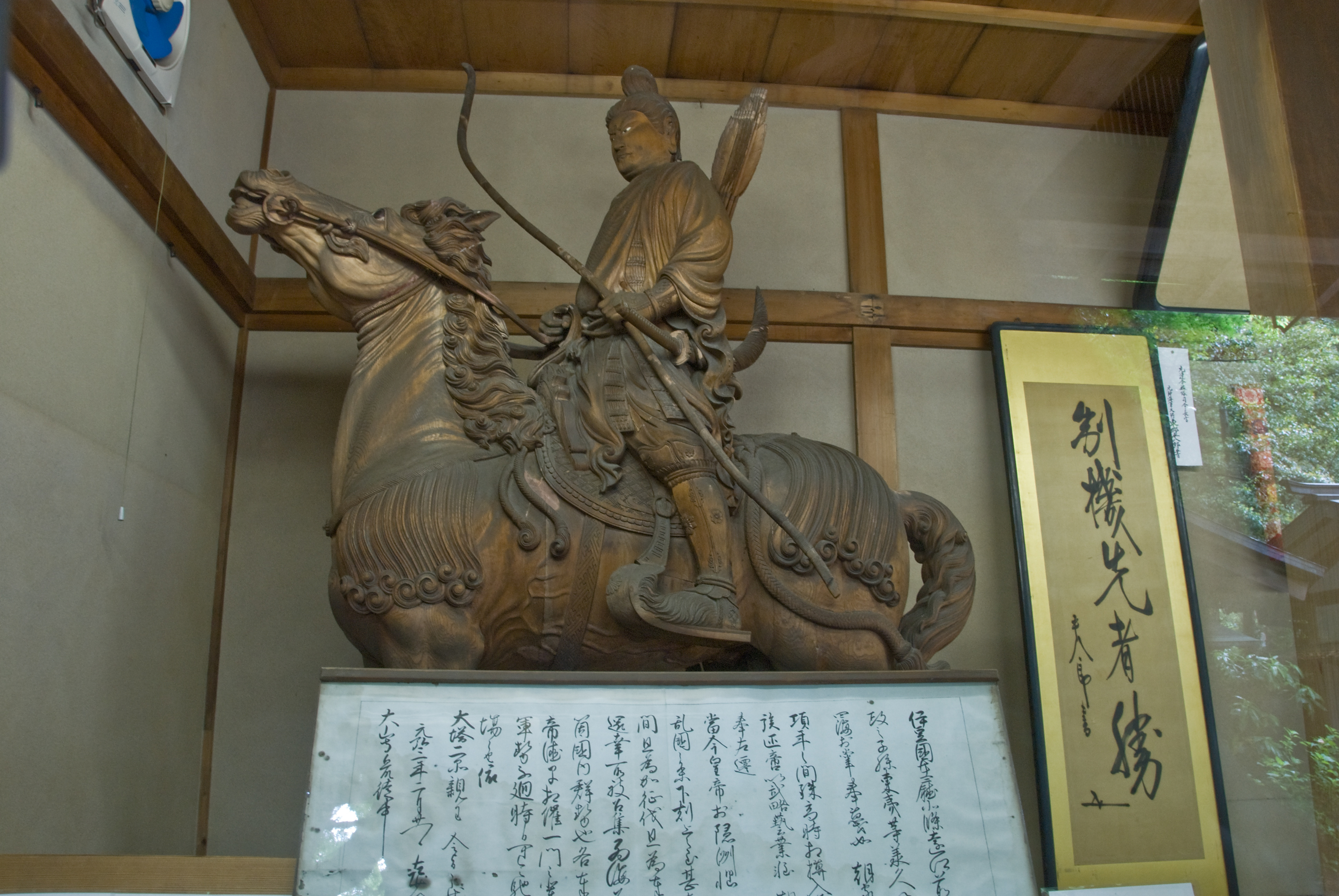
Prince Morinaga's statue at Kamakura-gū in Kamakura

Prince Morinaga, with his prestige and his devotion to the civilian government cause, was Takauji's natural enemy and could count therefore on the support of his adversaries, among them Nitta Yoshisada, whom Takauji had offended. Tension between the Emperor and the Ashikaga gradually grew, until Takauji had Morinaga arrested on a pretext and first confined him in Kyoto, then transported him to Kamakura, where the Prince was kept prisoner until late August 1335. The situation in Kamakura continued to be tense, with Hōjō supporters staging sporadic revolts here and there. In the course of the same year Hōjō Tokiyuki, son of last regent Takatoki, tried to re-establish the shogunate by force and defeated Tadayoshi in Musashi, in today's Kanagawa Prefecture. Tadayoshi had to flee, so before leaving he ordered the beheading of Prince Morinaga. Kamakura was therefore temporarily in Tokiyuki's hands. Heard the news, Takauji asked the Emperor to make him sei-i tai-shōgun so that he could quell the revolt and help his brother. When his request was denied, Takauji organized his forces and returned to Kamakura without the Emperor's permission, defeating the Hōjō. (Note: Unlike every other source consulted Goble, on page 38 of his "History of Japan" (see references), George Sansom states that Tokiyuki was killed on September 8, 1335 by Ashikaga forces entering Kamakura. This is also certainly an error.) He then installed himself in Kamakura's Nikaidō neighborhood. When invited to return to Kyoto, he let it be known through his brother Tadayoshi that he felt safer where he was, and started to build himself a mansion in Ōkura, where first Kamakura shōgun Minamoto no Yoritomo's residence had been.

== Civil war ==
Kyoto by then was aware that Takauji had assumed wide powers without imperial permission, for example nominating an Uesugi clan member to the post of Constable of Kōzuke, Nitta Yoshisada's native province. By late 1335 several thousand of the emperor's men were ready to go to Kamakura, while a great army at the command of Kō no Moroyasu was rushing there to help it resist the attack. On November 17, 1335, Tadayoshi issued a message in his brother's name asking all samurai to join the Ashikaga and destroy Nitta Yoshisada. The Court, meanwhile, had done the opposite, ordering samurai from all provinces to join Yoshisada and destroy the two Ashikaga. The war started with most samurai convinced that Takauji was the man they needed to have their grievances redressed, and most peasants were persuaded that they had been better off under the shogunate. The campaign was therefore enormously successful for the Ashikaga, with huge numbers of samurai rushing to join the two brothers. By February 23 of the following year Nitta Yoshisada and the Emperor had lost, and Kyoto itself had fallen. On February 25, 1336, Ashikaga Takauji entered the capital and the Kenmu Restoration ended.

== Calendrical peculiarities of the era ==
The Kenmu era is in the anomalous condition of having two different durations. Because Japanese era names (nengō) change with the Emperor and the Imperial House split in two after 1336, the Kenmu era was counted by the two sides in two different ways. "Kenmu" is the era after the Genkō era, and it is understood to have spanned the years 1334 through 1336 before the beginning of the "Engen" era, as time was reckoned by the Southern Court; and it is concurrently said to have spanned the years 1334 through 1338 before Ryakuō, as time was reckoned by the rival Northern Court. Because the Southern Court, the loser, is nonetheless considered the legitimate one, its time reckoning is the one used by historians.

== See also ==
- Fifteen Shrines of the Kenmu Restoration

== Notes ==
Preceded by Kamakura period 1185–1333	History of Japan; Kenmu Restoration; 1333–1336	Succeeded by Muromachi period 1336–1573
