= Kenmu =

Period of Japanese history (1334–1338)

Kenmu (建武) was a Japanese era name of the Northern Court during the Era of Northern and Southern Courts after Shōkei and before Ryakuō. Although Kemmu is understood by the Southern Court as having begun at the same time, the era was construed to have begun after Genkō and before Engen.

This period spanned the years from January 1334 through August 1338 in the North, and until only February 1336 in the Southern Court. The reigning Emperors were Emperor Go-Daigo in the south and Emperor Kōmyō in the north.

== Nanboku-chō overview ==
The Imperial seats during the Nanboku-chō period were in relatively close proximity, but geographically distinct. They were conventionally identified as: Northern capital : Kyoto; Southern capital : Yoshino.

During the Meiji period, an Imperial decree dated March 3, 1911, established that the legitimate reigning monarchs of this period were the direct descendants of Emperor Go-Daigo through Emperor Go-Murakami, whose Southern Court been established in exile in Yoshino, near Nara.

Until the end of the Edo period, the militarily superior pretender-Emperors supported by the Ashikaga shogunate had been mistakenly incorporated in Imperial chronologies despite the undisputed fact that the Imperial Regalia were not in their possession.

This illegitimate Northern Court had been established in Kyoto by Ashikaga Takauji.

== Change of era ==
- 1333, also called Kenmu gannen (建武元年): The new era name was created to mark an event or series of events. The previous era ended and the new one commenced in Shōkei 1 as time was reckoned in the Northern Court in Kyoto; and the era began in Genkō 4, as time was ordered in the Southern Court in Yoshino.

== Events of the Kenmu era ==
- 1333–1336 (Kenmu): The Kenmu Restoration was an attempt by Emperor Go-Daigo to restore Imperial authority after the fall of the Kamakura shogunate. The short-lived restoration was thwarted by Ashikaga Takauji who established a new bakufu which came to be known as the Ashikaga shogunate or the Muromachi shogunate. The failure of the restoration resulted in the creation of two rival Imperial courts which struggled for supremacy until 1392.
- 1334 (Kenmu 1): Emperor Go-Daigo caused Kenmu nenchū gyōji to be written. This was a book which described the ceremonies of the court; and its purpose was to aid the process of reviving ancient court etiquette.
- October 25, 1334 (Kenmu 1, 27th day of the 9th month): Emperor Go-Daigo made an Imperial progress to Kamo-jinja. No other emperor would visit Kamo's shrines until April 29, 1863 (Bunkyū 3, 11th day of the 3rd month), when Emperor Kōmei made an Imperial progress to Kamo-jinja accompanied by the shōgun, all the principal officials and many feudal lords. This was the first Imperial progress since Go-Mizunoo visited Nijō Castle more than 230 years before.
- 1336 (Kenmu 3): An anonymous author published Kenmu nenkan ki, which was a chronicle of the Kemmu era. The text is a source of information about laws, government, bureaucrats, and arable lands and estates given by the emperor to the nobility or to religious institutions (shōen).
- 1336 (Kenmu 3): Ashikaga Takauji promulgated the Kenmu-shikimoku, which was a legal code with 17 articles addressing the behavior of the nobles.

== Notes ==
Preceded by Shōkei	Northern Era or nengō 1334-1338	Succeeded by Ryakuō
Preceded by Genkō	Southern Era or nengō 1333-1336	Succeeded by Engen
