= Karyaku =

Period of Japanese history (1326–1329)

Karyaku (嘉暦), also romanized as Kareki, was a Japanese era name (年号, nengō; lit. "year name") after Shōchū and before Gentoku. This period spanned the years from April 1326 through August 1329. The reigning Emperor was Go-Daigo-tennō (後醍醐天皇).

== Change of era ==
- 1326 Karyaku gannen (嘉暦元年): The new era name was created to mark an event or series of events. The previous era ended and the new one commenced in Shōchū 3.

== Events of the Karyaku era ==
- March 8, 1327 (Karyaku 2, 14th day of the 2nd month): There is a total eclipse of the moon.

== Notes ==
Preceded by Shōchū	Era or nengō Karyaku; 1326–1329	Succeeded by Gentoku
