= Gentoku =

Period of Japanese history (1329–1331)

Gentoku (元徳) was a Japanese era name after Karyaku and before Genkō. This period spanned the years from August 1329 through April 1331 in the Southern Court, but continued to be used in the Northern Court until 1332. The reigning Emperor was Go-Daigo-tennō (後醍醐天皇).

== Change of era ==
- 1329 Gentoku gannen (元徳元年): The new era name was created to mark an event or series of events. The previous era ended and the new one commenced in Karyaku 4.

== Events of the Gentoku era ==
- March 27, 1330 (Gentoku 2, 8th day of the 3rd month): The Emperor visited Tōdai-ji and Kōfuku-ji in Nara.

== Notes ==
| Preceded by Karyaku | Era or nengō Gentoku; 1329–1331 | Succeeded by Genkō |
