= Kikuchi Takefusa =

Japanese clan head and samurai (1245–1298)

- 菊池 武房
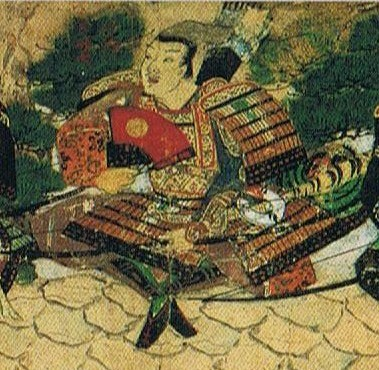
- Born: 1245; Higo Province, Japan
- Died: August 27, 1298 (aged 52–53); Higo Province, Japan
- Military career
- Allegiance: Kikuchi clan, Prince Koreyasu
- Rank: Daimyō
- Nickname: Jirō (次郎)
- Conflicts: Mongol invasions of Japan; Battle of Bun'ei; Battle of Akasaka; Battle of Kōan

Kikuchi Takefusa (菊池 武房; 1245 – August 27, 1298) was the 10th head of the Kikuchi clan of Higo Province and gained fame for himself and his clan during the defense of Japan during both Mongol invasions of Japan.

== Background and family ==
Kikuchi Jirō Takefusa was son of the 9th head of the clan, Kikuchi Takayasu (菊池 隆泰); Jirō (次郎) means "second son". His mother whose name is unknown was from the equally famous Ōtomo clan and a great-granddaughter of Minamoto no Yoritomo through his illegitimate son. Takefusa became head of the clan after his father since his elder brother had died young. His younger brother Aritaka was adopted by their retainers, the Akahoshi clan.

== First Mongol Invasion (1274) ==
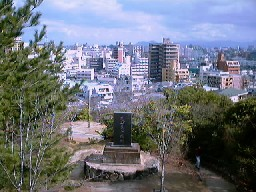
Sohara Park monument for the Mongolian invasion.

During the first Mongol invasion at the Battle of Bun'ei he fought with his younger brother Aritaka and they were both awarded by the Emperor. Takefusa shot a Mongol general in the face with a signed arrow, precipitating the recall of the first Mongol invasion. Bun'ei is really the name of a campaign comprising many battles.

=== Battle of Akasaka ===
The Mongols had defeated or annihilated the defenders on the small islands of Tsushima, Iki, Hirato, Taka and Nokono during their island hopping towards the Japanese mainland. Akasaka was the first battle with a real army.

The yuan force had landed on Momochi field, Sawara District and divided into two groups one of which encamped at Akasaka. They were attacked by Kikuchi. j.Takefusa losing about 100 soldiers. The greater group retreated to the hill of Sōhara, and the smaller group to Tukahara field in Befu. The yuan force pitched a camp on Sōhara field which had a hill 30m in height and a great vantage point of the streets of Fukuoka city. The field is now Sōharakōen "Sōhara Park". The stone monument in the center of Sōharakōen marks the remains of yuan soldiers who were killed during the battle. During this battle, Kikuchi Takefusa gained fame for all the heads of the enemy that he collected.

From the diary of one of his commanders, Takezaki Suenaga:

"Thinking that I was the first to battle of all the warriors from Higo, I set off from the Hakata encampment. On my way to Akasaka, after passing the gate (torii) of the Sumiyoshi Shrine, I met a man on a dapple gray horse at Komatsubara. He wore purple armor with a reverse arrowhead design, and a crimson billowing cape (horo) and, having just defeated the invaders in their encampment, was returning with a hundred horsemen. The pirates had fled. Two had been taken. He looked most brave and had two retainers walking before him on his left and right carrying heads - one pierced on a sword, the other on a naginata. "Who passes here looking so brave?" I asked, and he replied, "I am Kikuchi Jirō Takefusa of Higo Province. Who are you?" I am Takezaki Gorō Hyōe Suenaga of the same province. Watch me attack! Saying so I charged."

== Second Mongol Invasion (1281) ==
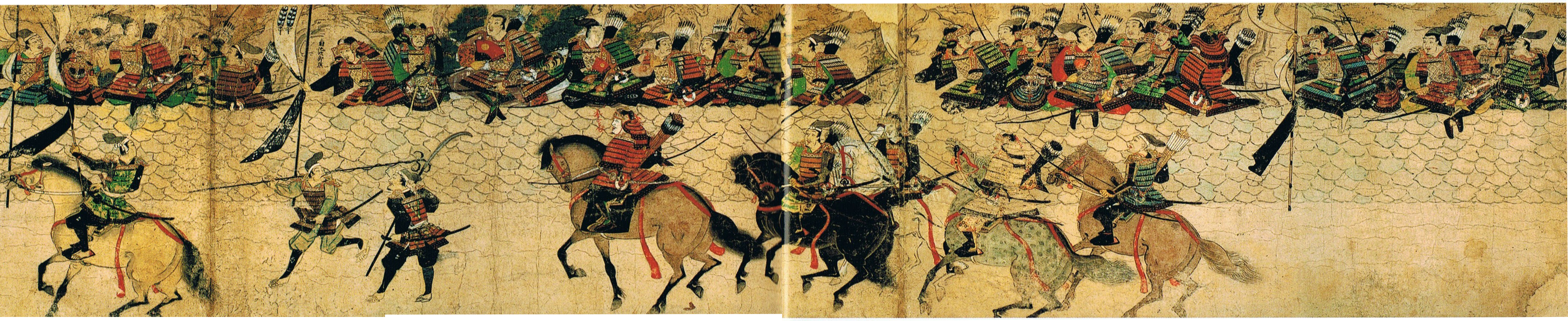
From the scroll Mōko Shūrai Ekotoba commissioned in 1293 by Takezaki Suenaga who is the rider in red armor. You can see the defensive wall at Hakata known as "Genko Borui". Takefusa sits on the wall with a hinomaru design fan inspecting his troops.

This was the largest naval invasion in history until D-Day. In the spring of 1281, Kublai Khan sent two separate forces. An impressive force of 900 ships containing 40,000 Yuan troops set out from Masan, Korea, while an even larger force of 100,000 sailed from southern China in 3,500 ships. The Mongols' plan called for an overwhelming coordinated attack by the combined imperial Yuan fleets. The Chinese fleet of the Yuan was delayed by difficulties in provisioning and manning the large number of ships they had.

=== The Battle of Kōan ===
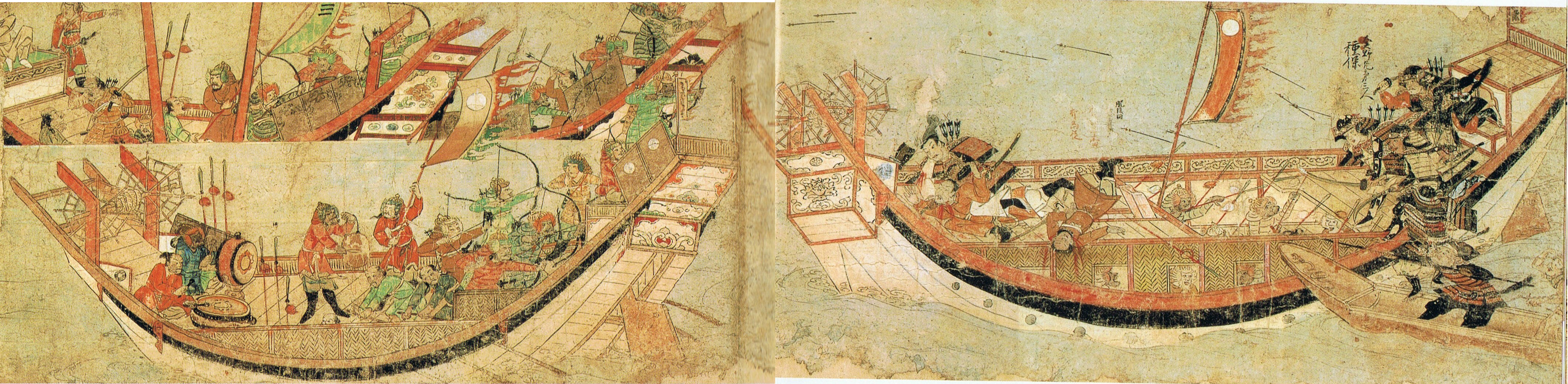
Also from the Mōko Shūrai Ekotoba: Takefusa and his men boarding the Mongolian ships. You can see Takefusa cutting off a Mongol soldier's head.

The Eastern Route Army arrived at Hakata Bay on June 21, and decided to proceed with the invasion without waiting for the larger Southern force which had still not left China. They were a short distance to the north and east of where their force had landed in 1274, and were in fact beyond the walls and defenses constructed by the Japanese. The samurai responded quickly, assaulting the invaders with waves of defenders, denying them the beachhead.

At night small boats carried small bands of samurai into the Yuan fleet in the bay. Under cover of darkness they boarded enemy ships, killed as many as they could, and withdrew before dawn. This harassing tactic led the Yuan forces to retreat to Tsushima, where they would wait for the Southern Route Army. However, over the course of the next several weeks, 3,000 men were killed in close quarters combat in the hot weather. Yuan forces never gained a beachhead.

The first of the Southern force ships arrived on July 16, and by August 12 the two fleets were ready to attack Japan. On August 15 a major tempest struck the Tsushima Straits, lasting two full days and destroying most of the Yuan fleet. Contemporary Japanese accounts indicate that over 4,000 ships were destroyed in the storm; 80 percent of the Yuan soldiers either drowned or were killed by samurai on the beaches. The loss of ships was so great that "a person could walk across from one point of land to another on a mass of wreckage".

== Death and legacy ==
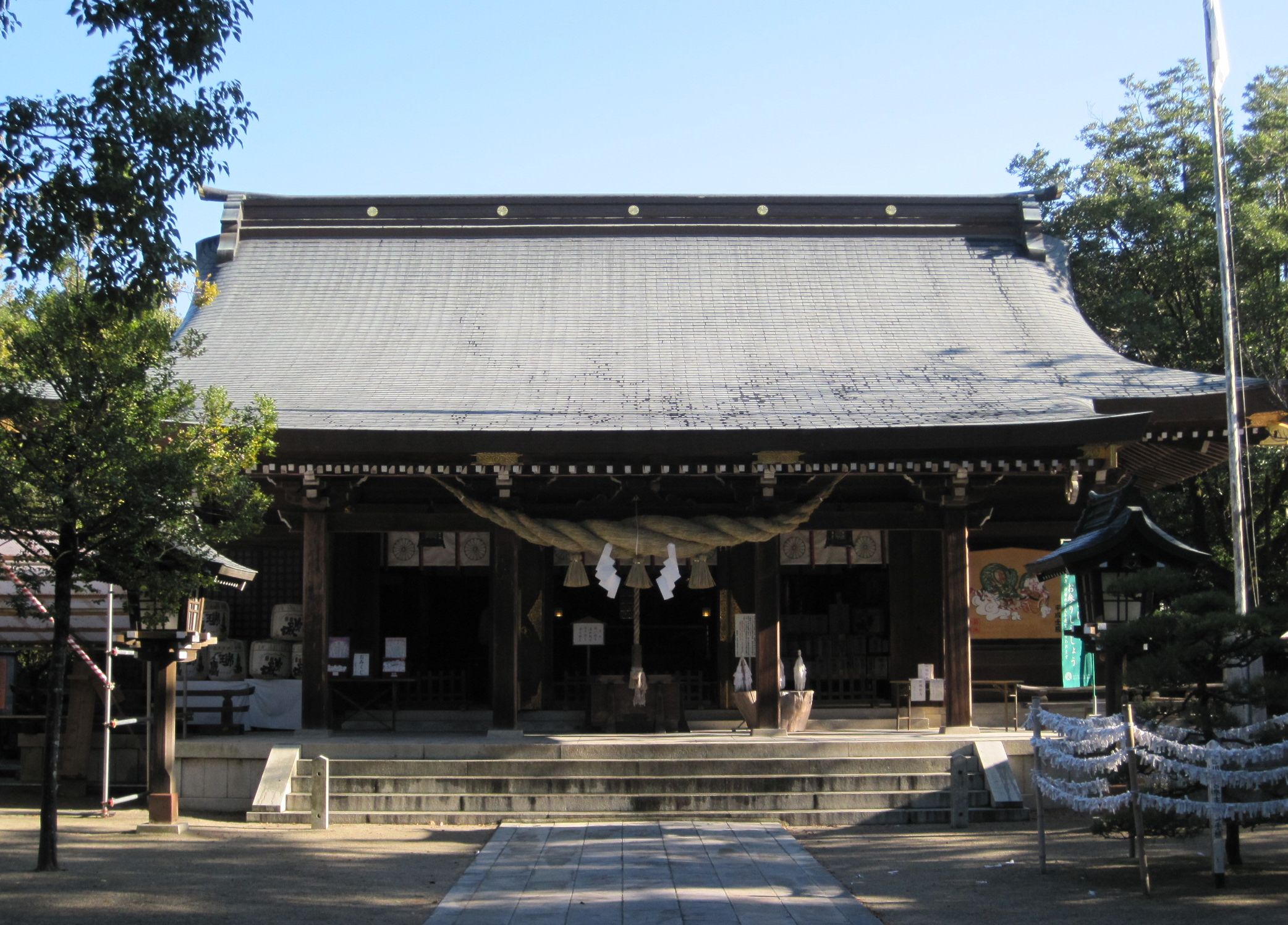
Kikuchi Shrine is the burial place of many of the clan heads including Takefusa.

After the battle Takefusa must have gone home to Kikuchi Castle. He died on August 27, 1298, from an unknown illness 17 years after the second invasion. His remains were interred at Kikuchi Shrine. His son and heir Kikuchi Takamori (菊池 隆盛) had died young even before him so his grandson Kikuchi Tokitaka (菊池 時隆, 1287–1304) became 11th head of the clan. Tokitaka also died young in battle so his brother the famous Kikuchi Taketoki (菊池 武時, 1292–1333) became 12th head.

Hayashi Narinaga who was a samurai general during the Sengoku Period was a descendant of Takefusa. Also, Saigō Takamori who is now known as the "last samurai"; The Saigo clan was a branch family of the Kikuchi. Another famous descendant through adoption is the artist and scholar Kikuchi Yōsai.

== Family ==
- Father: Kikuchi Takayasu (菊池隆泰)
- Mother: daughter of Takuma Yoshihide (託摩能秀女)
  - Wife(s): unknown
    - 1st son: Kikuchi Takamori (菊池隆盛)
    - Son: Kai Takemoto (甲斐武本)
    - Son: Horikawa Michitake (堀川道武)
    - Son: Nagase Takenari (長瀬武成)
    - Son: Shimazaki Taketsune (島崎武経)
    - Son: Hasama Takekado (迫間武門)
    - Son: Kitamura Takemura (重富武村)

== Ancestry ==
Ancestors of Kikuchi Takefusa

16. Kikuchi Takatada
8. Kikuchi Takatsugu
17.
4. Kikuchi Yoshitaka
18.
9.
19.
2. Kikuchi Takayasu
20.
10.
21.
5.
22.
11.
23.
1. Kikuchi Takefusa
24. Minamoto no Yoritomo
12. Ōtomo Yoshinao
25. Hatano no 利根局
6. Takuma Yoshihide
26. Hatakeyama Takanao
13. Shinmyo
27.
3. dtr. of Takuma Yoshihide
28.
14.
29.
7.
30.
15.
31.

== See also ==
- Mōko Shūrai Ekotoba
- Takezaki Suenaga
- Battle of Bun'ei
- Battle of Kōan
- Mongol Invasions of Japan
- Genko Borui
- Kikuchi clan
- Hayashi Narinaga
