= Kikuchi clan =

Japanese daimyō family

Kikuchi clan 菊池
- The emblem (mon) of the Kikuchi clan
- Home province: Higo.
- Parent house: Fujiwara clan (藤原氏) (claimed); Minamoto clan (源氏) (other theory); Gwisil clan (鬼室氏)(Baekje) (other theory); Ki clan (紀氏) (other theory)
- Titles: Various
- Founder: Kikuchi Noritaka (purported)
- Final ruler: Kikuchi Yuriko
- Founding year: 1070 (purported)
- Dissolution: 1554
- Ruled until: 1554, invasion by Ōtomo Sōrin
- Cadet branches: Akahoshi clan Jô clan Saigo clan

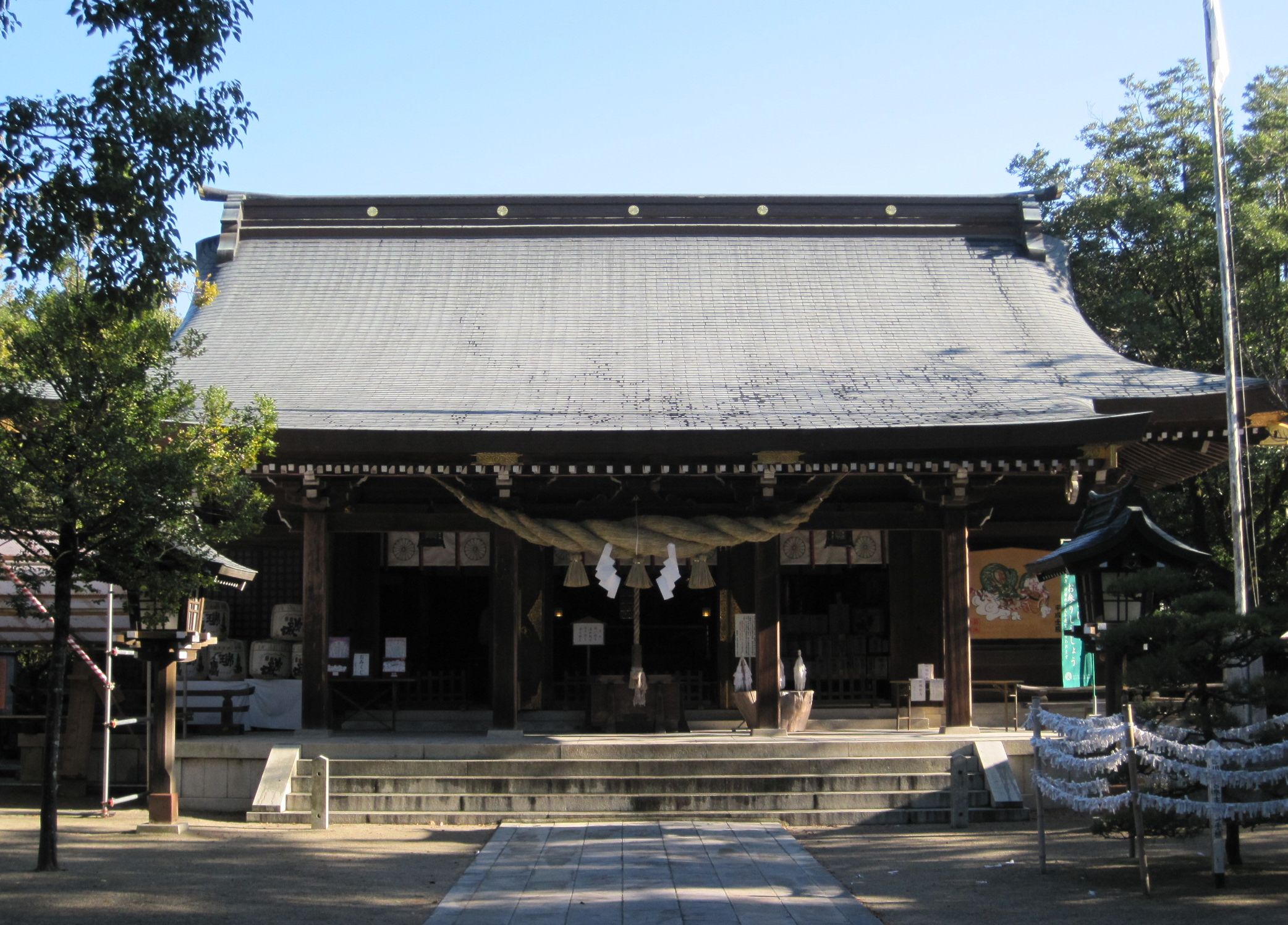
The Kikuchi Shrine in Kikuchi, Kumamoto, where clan members are enshrined

The Kikuchi clan (菊池氏, Kikuchi-shi) of Higo Province was a powerful daimyō family of Higo, Kyūshū. The lineage was renowned for valiant service in defense of the emperor and against foreign invaders. They initially distinguished themselves during the Jürchen invasion of northern Kyūshū in 1019 and rose to prominence during the Mongol invasions of Japan when the heroism of Kikuchi Takefusa helped drive back the enemy. The Kikuchi was active in the Kenmu Restoration (1333–1336), an attempt by the emperor Go-Daigo to reassert imperial authority against the Kamakura shogunate.

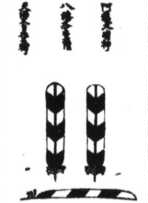
An early example of a mon based on a design of feathers appears on this white hata jirushi of the Kikuchi family.

The Kikuchi clan claimed descent from the Fujiwara clan. Japanese genealogist, Suzuki Matoshi claimed the clan was from the Korean kingdom of Baekje, while Oota Akira, Japanese historian, claimed the clan originated from Ki clan. Another theory is that the Kikuchi descend from Minamoto no Tsunemoto. However Y DNA analysis shows that the Kikuchi are O1B2A1A1, which is the Y DNA of the Fujiwara clan, and confirms their claims.

Several well-known warriors have come from this family such as Kikuchi Takanao, Kikuchi Takefusa who stopped the Mongol Invasions of Japan, Kikuchi Taketoki and Kikuchi Takemitsu. Along with the Ōtomo, Ōuchi, Shōni and Shimazu they would write the history of the island of Kyūshū.

The Kikuchi clan was destroyed when the Ōuchi clan attacked them and many clan members went into hiding either by moving or entering another family. Notable Kikuchi descendants are Hayashi Narinaga, a general for Mōri Motonari and Saigō Takamori who was dubbed the last samurai.

== History ==
=== Heian period (794–1185) ===
==== Kikuchi Noritaka ====
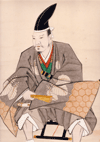
Fujiwara no Noritaka, founder of the clan, called himself Kikuchi Noritaka

Originally known as Fujiwara no Noritaka (藤原 則隆) he was the first to take the name Kikuchi. His father Masanori (政則) worked for the Fujiwara clan. Genealogists believed that Masanori was a son of Fujiwara no Takaie (藤原 隆家) but new evidence shows that his father was named Chikanori (親則). It is recorded that Masanori was awarded a katana for military service in time of war and also on April 3, 1022, he was appointed as governor of Tsushima for his service against Toi invaders. He changed his name to Tsushima-no-kami Kuranori. "Shōyūki, Jian 2/4/3"

Noritaka held a high position in the Daizaifu Government. When Fujiwara no Takaie moved back to Kyoto in 1070 (2nd year of Enkyū) Noritaka decided to retire and built a retirement villa in Kikuchi District (Kikuchi-gun), Higo Province where he lived until his death. The remains of the villa can still be seen today. In 1071 (3rd year of Enkyū) he became master of Kikuchi District where he established a castle town with retainers. Today there is a city in Kumamoto Prefecture called Kikuchi, Kumamoto. He took the name of his district and founded the Kikuchi clan.

==== Kikuchi Takanao (d. 1185) ====
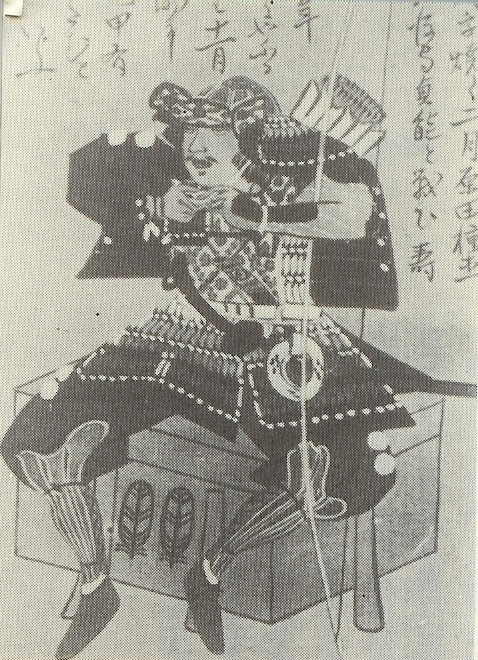
Portrait of Kikuchi Takanao sitting on a box with his two feathered mon

Born the second son of Tsunemune he was known as Kikuchi no Jirō Takanao (菊池 次郎 隆直) and became the sixth head of the Kikuchi clan. His childhood name was Kurō (九郎). He was eventually given the title Higo-Gon-no-kami (vice-governor). In 1180 at the start of the Genpei War he sided with Minamoto no Yoritomo and began levying troops in Kyūshū but Taira no Sadayoshi marched against him and defeated him. Later Takanao was present at the Battle of Dan-no-ura. Shortly after the battle that same year he was turned over to Minamoto no Yoshitsune by his lord Ogata no Saburo Koreyoshi and was taken to the Rokujō riverbed where he was beheaded.

"One of your retainers, Kikuchi no Jirō Takanao, has been my enemy for years ... You may rely on me if you will turn Kikuchi over for execution." —Minamoto no Yoshitsune

At the end of the twelfth-century events far away in eastern Japan led to the establishment of Japan's first military government, the Kamakura shogunate, which, during the initial stages at least, ran in tandem with the old imperial administration. The wars surrounding the birth of this new regime saw the Kikuchi clan coalesce into a powerful warrior league or bushidan. In 1181–82, their leader Kikuchi Takanao, joined with Ogata Koreyoshi of Bungo, another important local warrior, in rebellion against the Taira, which converted them into de facto allies of Minamoto Yoritomo, founder of the Bakafu. This rising was, however, crushed by Haruda Tanenao. Then, perversely, as the fighting drew to a close and the Taira star waned, the Kikuchi chose to align themselves with the erstwhile enemies and, together with the leading Kyūshū warriors including the Haruda, Yamaga, and Itai, suffered a crushing defeat at the hands of the now triumphant Bakafu. The battle took place off the coast of Kyūshū, at Dannoura, and it saw the emergence of Minamoto no Yoritomo as Japan's unquestioned military leader. His forces were drawn largely from the east, while, in the dying moments, the Taira had relied almost exclusively on warriors from Kyūshū. The new military regime, therefore, titled decidedly toward the east and against the west, a fact that was to have profound consequences for the island's future.

=== Kamakura period (1185–1333) ===
==== Kikuchi Yoshitaka (1201–1258) ====
Yoshitaka was the eighth clan head and son of Takatsugu. During the Genpei War he was fought on the side of the Heike and after the war even though he was on the losing side the Genji permitted Yoshitaka to keep is land. During the Shōkyū War of 1221, Kikuchi Yoshitaka's job was Kyōto Obanyaku which was the post to guard Kyōto, specifically the palace and the residences of special imperial family members (and later those of the Fujiwara clan). He dispatched his two uncles to Kyōto to follow the Gotobajoko (retired Emperor) but the Kamakura shogunate were pleased increasing the lands of the Kikuchi.

==== Kikuchi Takefusa (1245 – March 26, 1285) ====
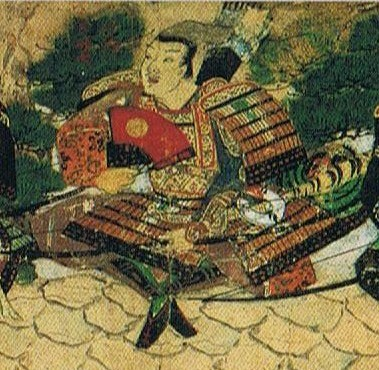
Kikuchi Takefusa sitting on the wall at Hakata Bay waiting for the Mongolian fleet.

Born the second son of Takayasu he was known as Kikuchi Jirō Takefusa (菊池 次郎 武房); His mother was a daughter of Takuma Yoshihide (託摩 能秀) who was in turn son of the famous Ōtomo Yoshinao who was Governor of Bungo and Buzen with the title of Sakon Shogen (possibly an illegitimate son of Minamoto no Yoritomo). He gained fame for his crucial role in the Mongol invasions of Japan and in 1274 during the first Mongol invasion (Bunye) he fought with his brother Aritaka and they were awarded. The family rose to prominence during the second Mongol invasion in 1281 when the heroism of Takefusa helped drive back the enemy. The Mongolian force that landed from the Momochi field divided into two groups, being attacked by Takefusa at Akasaka, the greater group retreated to the hill of Sohara and the smaller group to Tukahara field in Befu.

The Mongolian force pitched a camp in Sohara field which had a hill with the height of 30m and had a good view over the streets of Fukuoka city, and now is called Soharakouen Park. The stone monument in the center of Soharakouen Park shows the remains of battles of the Mongolian Invasion. Takefusa gained fame for all the heads of the enemy that he collected. His retainer Takezaki Suenaga (竹崎 季長, 1246–1314) commissioned a scroll depicting the battle against the Mongols. Takefusa died young at the age of 41 only a few years after his victory and since his son Kikuchi Takamori died before him he was succeeded by his grandsons.

==== Kikuchi Tokitaka (1287–1304) ====
Born the first son and heir of Takamori and grandson of Takefusa he was also known as Kikuchi Jirō Tokitaka (菊池 次郎 時隆). His father died before his grandfather so he was nominated as clan head but he died very young at the age of seventeen fighting for the position with his uncle Takenori so he was succeeded by his younger brother Taketoki.

==== Kikuchi Taketoki (1292 – April 27, 1333) ====
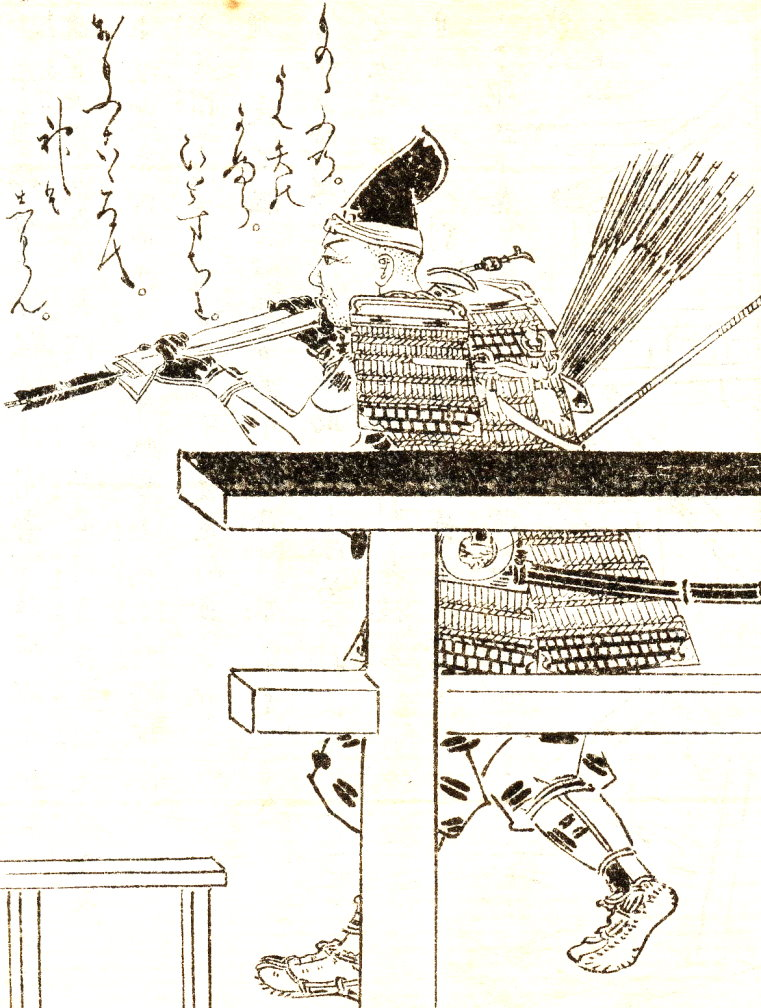
Kikuchi Taketoki depicted by Kikuchi Yōsai.

The second son of Takamori he was the twelfth clan head succeeding his older brother Tokitaka. His child name was Shoryumaru (正竜丸). After coming of age he became known as Kikuchi Ikejirō nyudō Jakua and formerly as Taketoki. He succeeded the clan out of chance after his older brother Tokitaka and his uncle Takenori both died after fighting each other for the position of clan head. Taketoki had twelve children and many sons securing the clan lineage.

In 1333 Emperor Go-Daigo asked Taketoki to help him and he became Go-Daigo's right-hand and was greatly awarded. In the third year of Genkō (元弘, 1333), Taketoki attacked on secret orders from Godaigo against the then acting Chinzei-tandai Hōjō Hidetoki (北条英時). He burned down Hakata and attacked but Taketoki was captured with his sons (one was named Yoritaka) and beheaded, then the enemy used their heads for archery practice. He was a clever samurai but Hidetoki did not underestimate him and his allies Otomo Uji and the Shoni clan betrayed him. After his death, a movement began to overthrow Hōjō Hidetoki and his first son Takeshige succeeded him. Taketoki was buried in Fukuoka city where he has one grave for his head and one grave for his midsection. Kikuchi Shrine was made in his honor.

From the Hakata Nikki: "So the heads of Kikuchi nyudo, his son Saburo, Jakua's younger brother Kakusho, and the wakato were hung up in the place where warriors practice shootings dogs from horses. Jakua's, Saburo's, and Kakusho's [heads] were displayed separately. In the evening they were taken down and placed in the residence where they remained for about ten days. Then they were nailed to a board and a sign said that they were heads of the rebels, Kikuchi Tarō nyuda Jakua, his son Saburo, and Jakua's younger brother, Jirō Saburō nyudo Kakusho."

Death poem was written while surrounded by enemies and sent to his wife:

"My ancestral home,
Will you wait
For a man who knows not
if tonight will be
His last?"
—Kikuchi Taketoki

=== Muromachi period (1336–1573) ===
==== Kikuchi Takeshige (1307–1338) ====
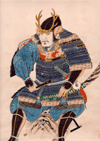
Kikuchi Takeshige.

Born the first son of Taketoki, at a younger age he held the rank of Ju-goi-no-ge (従五位下, Junior Fifth Rank, Lower Grade). His father and brothers were betrayed by the Shōni and Ōtomo when he attacked the Hōjō clan and beheaded. After the event, Takeshige hurried back to Kikuchi Castle and was awarded the title of governor of Higo Province by the Emperor Go-Daigo. In 1335 Ashikaga Takauji attacked Emperor Go-Daigo so Takeshige and his brother Takeyasu joined forces with Nitta Yoshitada repelling the Ashikaga who retreated to Kyōto. Ashikaga Takauji returned to Kyoto and captured Takeshige but released him. In 1337 he fought with the Southern armies once again but in 1338 he died and his younger brother succeeded him.

==== Kikuchi Takehito (1321–1401) ====
After the first son of Taketoki, Takeshige died he became the next head of the clan. He had other older brothers but he was the only one born from the head wife. His childhood name was Matajirō (又次郎). He ruled weakly and so his older brothers Takeshige and Toketoshi helped him with the clan. The Kikuchi was attacked by the Otomo clan and he wasn't able to handle the military situation so his brother Takemitsu took over the family and pushed him out. Takehito then became a priest and died at an old age.

==== Kikuchi Taketoshi (d. 1341) ====
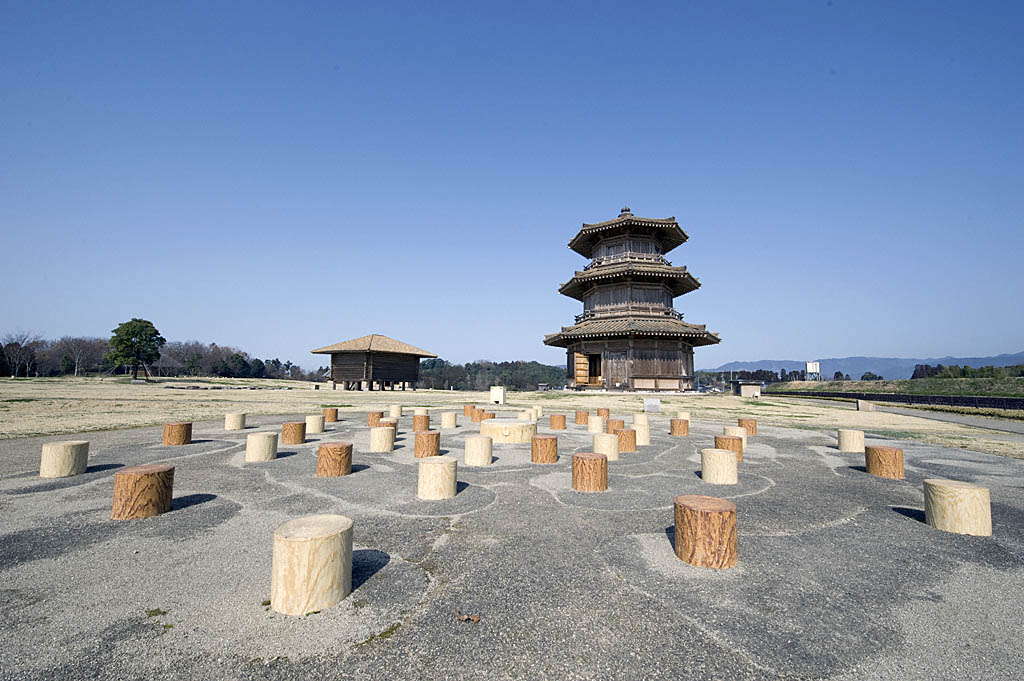
Comprising a series of buildings and watchtowers set on a hilltop with a commanding view of the surrounding area, the remains of the 14th century Kikuchi Castle, seat of the Kikuchi clan, are currently undergoing restoration.

He was the 8th son of Taketoki and older brother of Kikuchi Takemitsu.

Taketoshi fought against the Ashikaga and Northern Court as his brothers and father. "Taketoshi had already gone to the assistance of Nitta in the East, but his younger brother, together with other Kyūshū leaders, remained on the alert at Higo, where the Kikuchi family had its stronghold. Thus Takauji had to reckon with an influential group, including such promising men as Aso, Mihara, and Kuroki, who were at one in desiring to check his progress in Kyūshū. They had entered Higo for that purpose a few days before Takauji crossed the Straits. Early in April Taketoshi attacked the Shoni stronghold at Dazaifu, Chikuzen Province. He succeeded in reducing the fort and driving out Shoni Sadatsune who made a stand in the neighboring hills but was thoroughly defeated and committed suicide with several of his kinsmen."

Battle of Tatarahama (April 1336) – Kyūshū falls to Northern Imperial Court

Early in 1336, a number of Kyūshū clans, anticipating the movements of the shōgun's army against them, made efforts to unite and present a formidable resistance. A number of skirmishes were fought against clans loyal to the shōgun on the island, including a siege of Dazaifu, in which the Shōni clan stronghold was taken; Shōni Sadatsune fled, but was defeated soon afterwards, and committed suicide along with a number of his retainers. Shōgun Ashikaga Takauji, arriving in Munakata, a short distance away, at this time in early April, learned of the siege of Dazaifu and the death of Shōni Sadatsune. Gathering forces, he marched from Munakata on April 15 and journeyed to Tatarahama, fifteen miles (24 km) away, where he met the opposing army, consisting primarily of warriors of the Kikuchi, Aso, Mihara, and Kuroki clans under the command of a Kikuchi Taketoshi.

The military chronicle Baishō-ron describes Tatarahama as "a stretch of over three miles (4.8 km) of dry foreshore, crossed at the south end by a small stream. The precincts of the Hakozaki Hachiman Shrine consist of some five square miles of pine forest. To the south lies the city of Hakata." By the end of the battle, the Kikuchi clan forces had been chased by Ashikaga Tadayoshi to Dazaifu, at which point they fled into the hills. The Aso and Akizuki clan commanders committed suicide, and other commanders simply surrendered. Takauji rewarded his commanders for their bravery and service but offered a pardon to his opponents, and to several clans not participating in the battle, who thus joined him in its aftermath. Kyūshū thus became united under the shogunate, and the Northern Imperial Court.

==== Kikuchi Takemitsu (1319–1373) ====
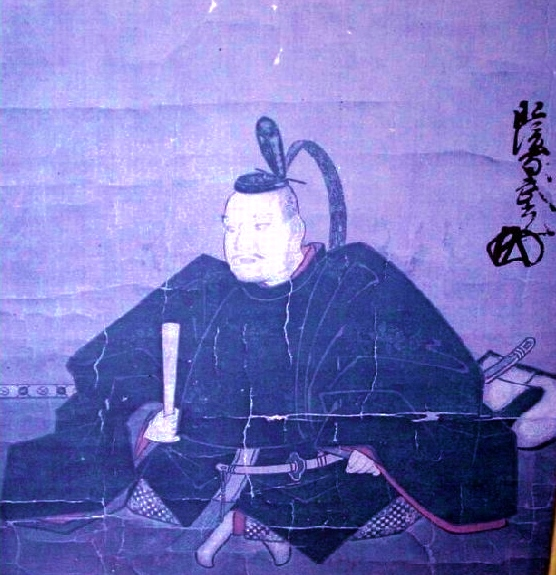
Portrait of Kikuchi Takemitsu

Takemitsu was the 9th son of Taketoki and continued fighting for the Emperor as his father had done. He was a general of the Nanbokucho era, fighting on the side of the emperor, along with Prince Kaneyoshi (懐良親王, also known as Kanenaga) (1326–1383) (son of Emperor Go-Daigo). The scene where he fights a famous battle on the Chikugo river is probably his most famed. He was the strongest and most dependable ally of Prince Kanenaga in the struggle against the Bafuku. He was stuck with a triple threat by the armies of Ashikaga Yoshinori, Ashikaga Takasaki and Ashikaga Tadaaki. This made Takemitsu have to raise the siege of Takasaki and address himself to the defence of Daizaifu. The three Ashikaga armies enveloped Daizaifu and it fell into their hands before the end of September 1372. Takemitsu had to retreat and escaped to Chikugo with Prince Kanenaga. When Takemitsu died he left the loyalist defence without a really tested leader, and his heir Takemasa, a promising soldier, died in 1374.

The Battle of Oohobaru (The Battle of Chikugo River):

Forty thousand followed Kikuchi Takemitsu as their head advanced northwards from Kikuchi in Kumamoto with Prince Kanenaga, and were opposed to North Dynasty's Army across the Chikugo River. Kikuchi Takemitu commanded 5000 soldiers to cross the Chikugo River and pitched a camp around present Miyase. The unit of Kikuchi Takemitsu went along the present Oomuta Railway Line northwards, and headed for Ajisaka. But, forces of the Shouni Family avoided the fight and retreated to the point near present Ooho station. Although as for this battle line, the stalemate continued for half a month, on the midnight of August 15, Takemitsu finally took the suicide corps of 3000 and moved quietly on the east side of the forces of the Syouni, and attacked it from both sides. In a short while, 1000 horsemen headed by Kikuchi Takemasa arrived there for the help and the Battle of Oohobaru started. Although both armies repeated fierce fight of advance and retreat around Ogoori, the Kikuchi army pressed the Shouni army gradually, the Shouni army retreated along present the Amagi Railway Line toward the northeast to arrive at Yamakumahara which spread over present Tachiarai. Although the Shoni army tried to reorganize the disrupted forces at Mt. Hanatateyama, they ran into Mt. Hōmanzan 15 kilometers north because they were scattered by the fierce pursuit of the Kikuchi army which didn't give any spare time for them.

==== Kikuchi Takemasa (July 6, 1342 – May 26, 1374) ====
Also known as Kikuchi Jirō Takemasa

Born the first son of Takemitsu on July 6, 1342, he fought in Kyūshū against the Northern Court with his father and had great success. When Imagawa Sadayo (今川 貞世) (1326–1420) became head of the opposing army things starting going sour for the Kikuchi. In November 1373 his father died and he became the head of the clan and hearing about the death of Takemitsu, Imagawa attacked and won many battles against Takemasa. Kikuchi Takemasa asked Asō Koretaka for help and he was one of their most trusted retainers in the war against the North.

Takemasa died just one year after his father on May 26, 1374.

==== Kikuchi Taketomo (1363–1407) ====
Taketomo was born the first son and heir of Takemasa becoming the 17th head of the clan. He wrote the "Taketomo moshijo" on the ancestry of the Kikuchi. He said that his ancestor is Fujiwara no Michitaka and Michitaka's fourth-generation descendant Noritaka came to live in Higo. He sent a copy of the genealogy to the government. This move was explained with the failing position of the Kikuchi at the time and showing ancestry from the Fujiwara would give the Kikuchi some more prestige and power. Masanori's father Chikanori is thought to be a descendant of Baekje immigrants. Taketomo shows up in the Tale of Genji where Lady Murakami calls him Chuwamono (powerful leader in the wilderness).

==== Kikuchi Yoshiyuki (1482–1504) ====
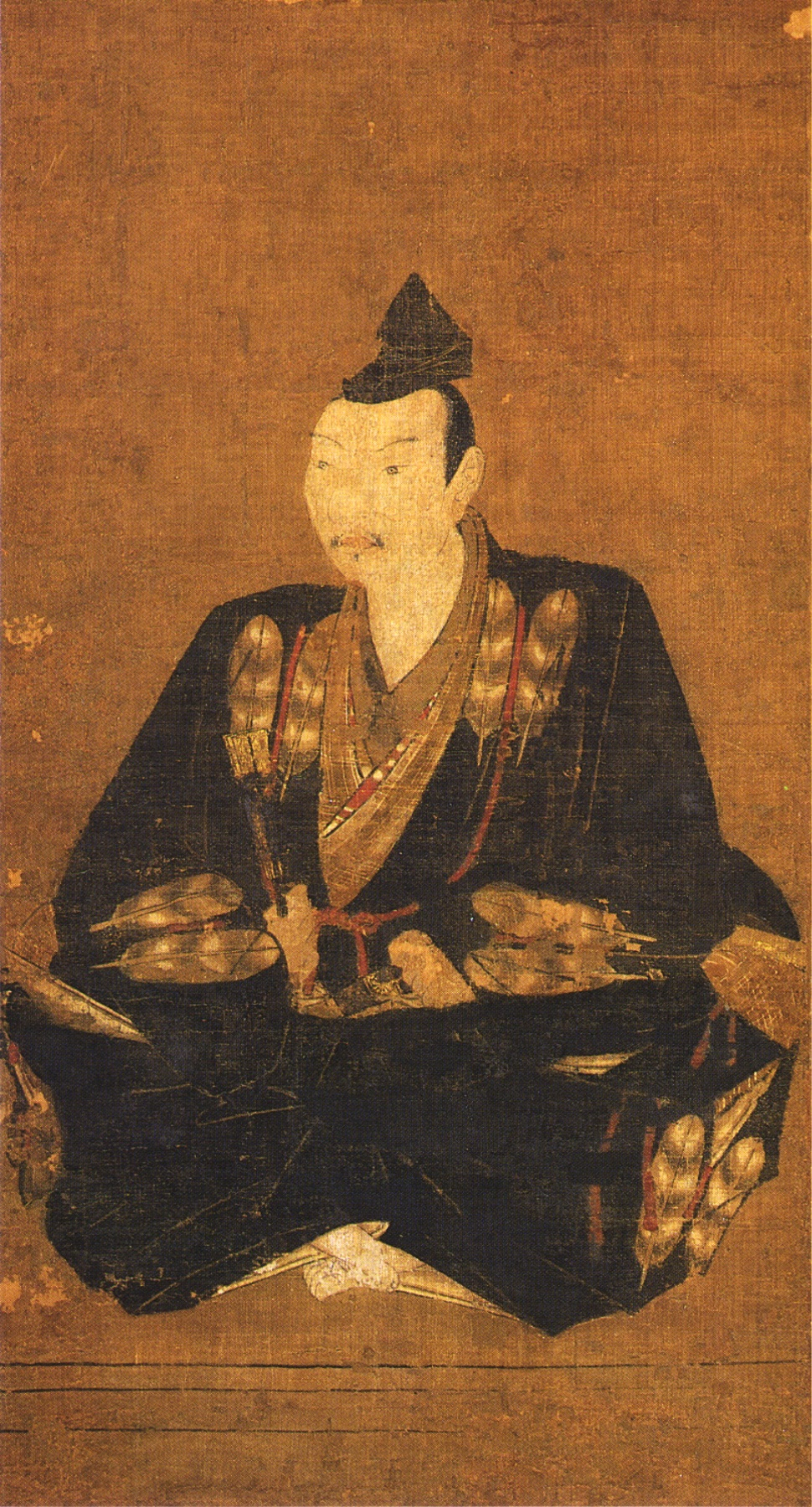
Kikuchi Yoshiyuki

Born the son of Shigetomo, as the twenty-second head of the clan he held the rank Ju-goi-no-ge (従五位下, Junior Fifth Rank, Lower Grade). He was succeeded by his brother Masataka who was the last head of the clan descended from the Kikuchi lineage since the twenty-fourth clan head Taketsune was adopted from the Asa clan.

==== Kikuchi Takekane (d. 1532) ====
He was born the son of Kikuchi Takeyasu who was 4th in descent from Kikuchi Takzumi, one of the sons of Kikuchi Taketoki. When the mainline (Takemitsu line) was having problems with succession Takekane was adopted from the branch family and became the 25th head of the Kikuchi clan.

==== Kikuchi Yuriko (1505–1554) ====
The last and 26th head of the Kikuchi Clan before the rule of Higo went to the Ōtomo even though he was from that clan himself. "The head of the Ōtomo family, Ōtomo Yoshiaki placed his younger brother Ōtomo Shigeharu as the fictive heir of the famous tradition rich but now extinct shugo family, the Kikuchi of Higo. Yoshiaki's son was the famous Ōtomo Sōrin (大友 宗麟) (1530–1587). Kikuchi Yoshitake did not act as a puppet at all though and placed his bets on the Ōuchi to prevail in Northern Kyūshū and took up arms against Yoshiaki. But he was no match for his older brother and was brushed aside. By 1543, Ōtomo Yoshiaki's hold on Higo was solid enough to make his appointment as shugo of that province. When he recovered Higo-Kumamoto Castle, his retainer Akahoshi Chikaie (赤星親家) sided with the Ōtomo. Chikaie later fought against Yoshitake's other retainer, Kumabe Chikanaga, and died. Ōtomo Sōrin (Ōtomo Yoshishige) became head of the Ōtomo in 1550 and his uncle Kikuchi Yoshitake declared his independence about the same time. Sōrin marched against him and destroyed him in 1554 ending the long line of the Kikuchi clan.

== Kikuchi family heads ==
- Chikanori (親則)
- Masanori (政則) (997–1064)
1. Kikuchi Noritaka (菊池 則隆) (11th century) (Kikuchi progenitor)
2. Kikuchi Tsunetaka (菊池 経隆) (11th century)
3. Kikuchi Tsuneyori (菊池 経頼) (12th century)
4. Kikuchi Tsunemune (菊池 経宗) (12th century)
5. Kikuchi Tsunenao (菊池 経直) (12th century)
6. Kikuchi Takanao (菊池 隆直) (d. 1185)
7. Kikuchi Takatada (菊池 隆定) (13th century)
  - Kikuchi Takatsugu (菊池 隆継) (13th century)
8. Kikuchi Yoshitaka (菊池 隆能) (13th century)
9. Kikuchi Takayasu (菊池 隆泰) (13th century)
10. Kikuchi Takefusa (菊池 武房) (1245–1285) (r. 12??–1285)
  - Kikuchi Takamori (菊池 隆盛) (13th–14th century)
11. Kikuchi Tokitaka (菊池 時隆) (1287–1304) (r. 12??–1304
12. Kikuchi Taketoki (菊池 武時) (1292–1333) (r. 1304–1333)
13. Kikuchi Takeshige (菊池 武重) (1307–1338) (r. 1333–1338)
14. Kikuchi Takehito (菊池 武士) (1321–1401) (r. 1338–1345)
15. Kikuchi Takemitsu (菊池 武光) (1319–1373) (r. 1345–1372)
16. Kikuchi Takemasa (菊池 武政) (1342–1374) (r. 1372–1374)
17. Kikuchi Taketomo (菊池 武朝) (1363–1407) (r. 1374–1407)
18. Kikuchi Kanetomo (菊池 兼朝) (1383–1444) (r. 1407–1431)
19. Kikuchi Mochitomo (菊池 持朝) (1409–1446) (r. 1431–1446)
20. Kikuchi Tamekuni (菊池 為邦) (1430–1488) (r. 1446–1466)
21. Kikuchi Shigetomo (菊池 重朝) (1449–1493) (r. 1466–1493)
22. Kikuchi Yoshiyuki (菊池 能運) (1482–1504) (r. 1493–1504)
23. Kikuchi Masataka (菊池 政隆) (1491–1509) (r. 1504–1505)
24. Kikuchi Taketsune (菊池 武経) (1480–1537) (r. 1505–1511)
25. Kikuchi Takekane (菊池 武包) (d. 1532) (r. 1511–1520)
26. Kikuchi Yoshitake (菊池 義武) (1505–1554) (r. 1520–1554)

== Genealogy ==
Chikanori
   ┃
Masanori
   ┃
(1)Kikuchi Noritaka       
   ┣━━━━━━━━━━━━━━━━━━━━━━━━━━━━━━━━━━━━┳━━━━━━━━━━━━━━━━━━━━━━━━━━━┓
(2)Tsunetaka (Hyodo clan - )    Yoritaka (Kojima clan - )    Masataka (Saigo clan - 西郷氏)
   ┃
(3)Tsuneyori
   ┃
(4)Tsunemune
   ┃
(5)Tsunenao
   ┣━━━━━━━━━━━━━━━━━━━━━━━━━━━━━━━━━━━━━━━━━┓
(6)Takanao         (Akahoshi clan - 赤星氏)
   ┃
(7)Takatada
   ┃
Takatsugu
   ┃
(8)Yoshitaka
   ┣━━━━━━━━━━━━┳━━━━━━━━━━━━┳━━━━━━━━━━━━━━━━━━━━━━━━━━━━━━━━━━━━┓
(9)Takayasu          Takatsune (Jô clan - 城氏)        Takayori (Jô clan - 城氏)    
   ┣━━━━━━━━━━━━┳━━━━━━━━━━━━┳━━━━━━━━━━━━━━━━━━━━━┳━━━━━━━━━━━━━━━━━━━━━━━━━━━━━┳━━━━━━━━━━━━━━━━━┳━━━━━━━━┳━━━━━━━━┓
(10)Takefusa  Naotaka     Yoritaka    Aritaka (Akahoshi clan - 赤星氏)  (Wakamiya clan)         Takafuyu Yasunari Shigemune
   ┣━━━━━━━━━━━━┳━━━━━━━━━━━━┳━━━━━━━━━━━┳━━━━━━━━━━━┳━━━━━━━━━━━━┳━━━━━━━━━━┓
Takamori     Michitake    Takemoto    Takenari    Taketsune    Takekado   Takemura
   ┣━━━━━━━━━━━━┓
(11)Tokitaka  (12)Taketoki　
　              ┣━━━━━━━━━┳━━━━━━━━┳━━━━━━┳━━━━━━━━┳━━━━━━━━┳━━━━━━┳━━━━━━━━━┳━━━━━━━━━━━┳━━━━━━━━━━━┳━━━━━━━━━━┳━━━━━━━━━━━━┳━━━━━━━┳━━━━━━┓ 
        (13)Takeshige  Yoritaka      (14)Takehito   Takeyoshi        Taketoshi  (15)Takemitsu              Takezumi      Takenao ( Takase clan - )       Taketoyo
                                                                                        ┃                    ┃              ┃
                                                                                (16)Takemasa               Takemoto      Takekuni
                                                                                        ┃                    ┃              ┃
                                                                                (17)Taketomo               Moritake      Takenaga (adopted to Hayashi clan - 林氏)  
                                                                                        ┃                    ┃              ┃
                                                                                (18)Kanetomo               Yasuharu      Hayashi Narinaga[14]
                                                                                        ┃                    ┃
                                                                                (19)Mochitomo              Takeyasu
                                                                                        ┃                    ┃
                                                                                (20)Tamekuni            (25)Takekane
                                                                                        ┣━━━━━━━━┳━━━━━━━┓
                                                                                (21)Shigetomo   武邦     重安
                                                                                        ┃                ┃
                                                                                (22)Yoshiyuki      (23)Masataka
                                                                                        ┃┃
                                                                                (24)Taketsune (adopted from Asa clan - 阿蘇氏)
                                                                                        ┃┃
                                                                                (25)Takekane (from Takezumi line)
                                                                                        ┃┃
                                                                                (26)Yoshitake (Ōtomo Shigeharu - 大友氏)[12]

== Family Tree in Japanese ==
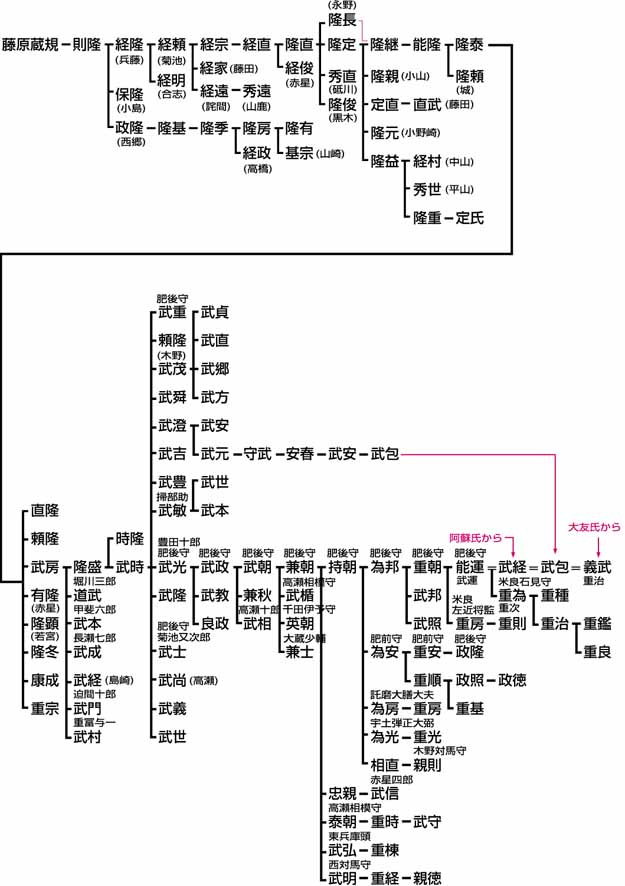
Click to see larger image

== Retainers ==
- Akahoshi clan (赤星氏) – cadet branch of the Kikuchi clan
  Akahoshi Chikaie (赤星親家) (1514–1562)
  Akahoshi Muneie (赤星統家) (1530–1619)
- Kumabe clan (隈部氏)
  Kumabe Chikanaga (隈部親永) (1516–1588)
  Kumabe Chikayasu (隈部親泰)
- Takezaki clan (竹崎氏)
  Takezaki Suenaga (竹崎季長) (1236–1314)
- Saigo clan (西郷氏) – cadet branch of the Kikuchi clan
- Jō clan (城氏) – cadet branch of the Kikuchi clan
  Jō Takeaki
- Kashiki clan (鹿子木氏)
- Udo clan (宇土氏)

== See also ==
- Ōtomo clan
- Ōuchi clan
- Shōni clan
