= Hakata (disambiguation) =

Hakata usually refers to Hakata-ku, Fukuoka, a ward in Fukuoka Prefecture, Japan.

Hakata may also refer to:

- Hakata, Ehime, a town in Ehime Prefecture, Japan; now part of Imabari
- Hakata Bay, a bay on the Japanese island of Kyūshū
  - Battle of Bun'ei, also known as the First Battle of Hakata Bay, during the first Mongol invasions of Japan
  - Battle of Kōan, also known as the Second Battle of Hakata Bay, during the second Mongol invasion of Japan
- Hakata dialect
- Hakata doll, traditional Japanese clay dolls, originally from Hakata
- Hakata Station, a large train station in Fukuoka
- Hakata, a southern African form of divination; see Astragalomancy
- Hakata, a nickname for the German Eastern Marches Society, a German nationalist organization
