= Imagawa Sadayo =

Japanese poet and military commander

- 今川貞世
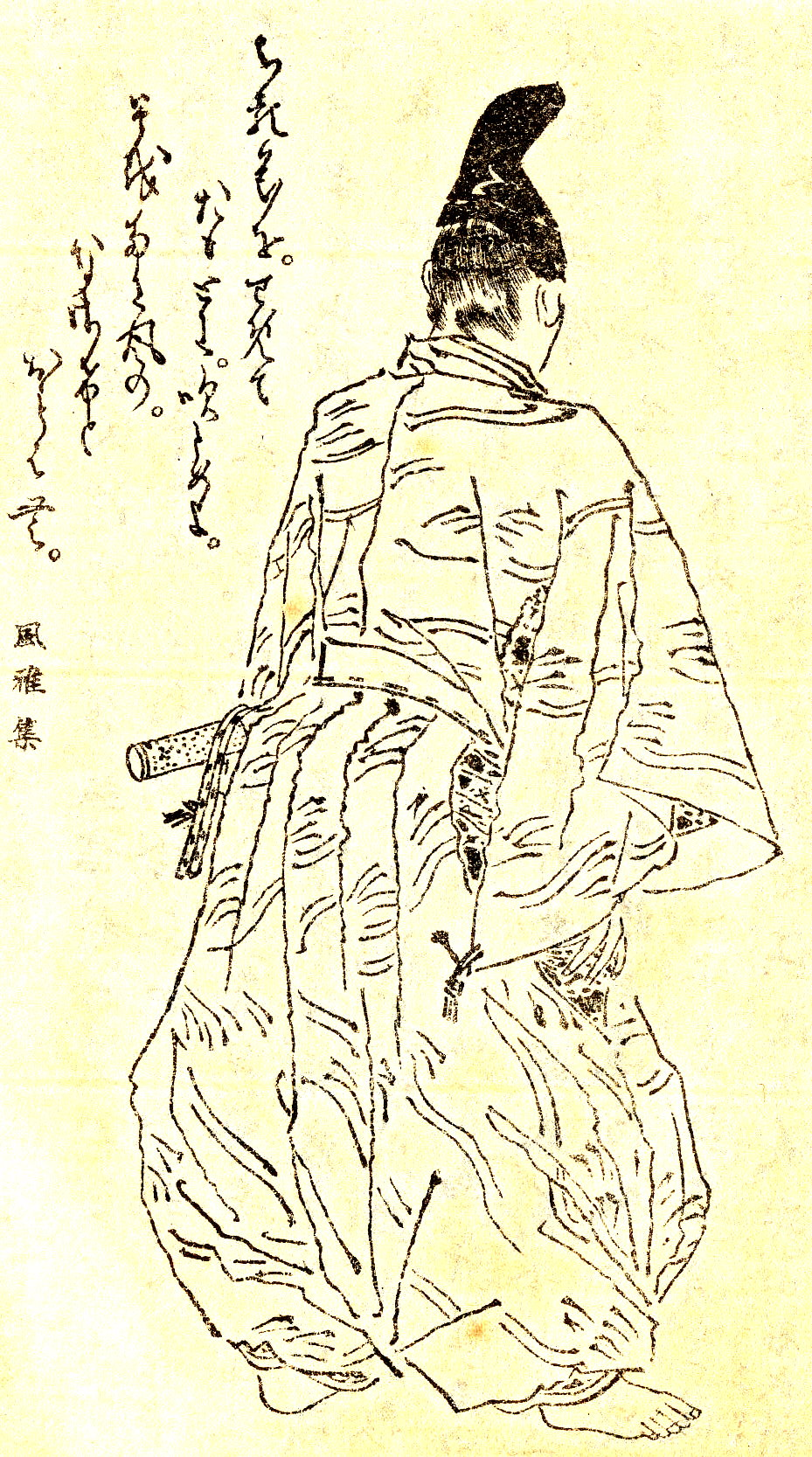
- Picture of Imagawa Sadayo by Kikuchi Yosai
- Born: 1326
- Died: October 5, 1420
- Burial place: Kaizō Temple Shizuoka Prefecture Shizuoka City Kaizou
- Other name: Imagawa Ryōshun
- Military career
- Allegiance: Ashikaga Takauji Ashikaga Yoshiakira Ashikaga Yoshimitsu
- Moromachi Shogunate: Governor, Headman Samurai-dokoro, Constable

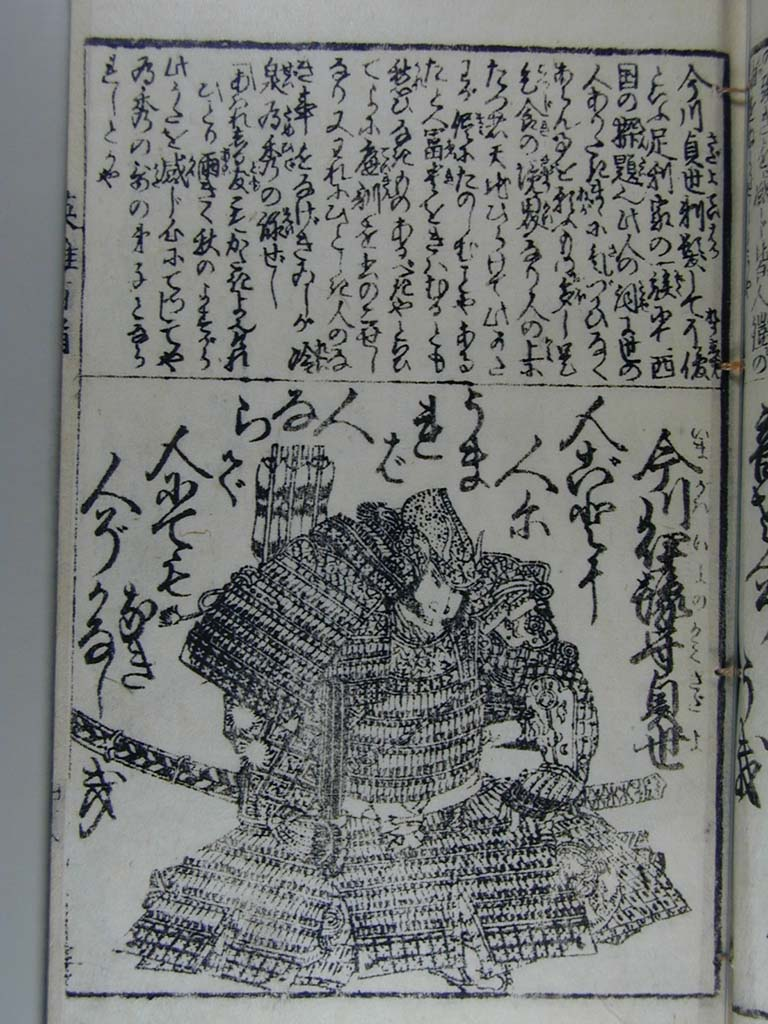
Imagawa Sadayo by "Eiyū Hyakunin Isshu (英雄百人一首)"

Imagawa Sadayo (今川 貞世; 1326 – 1420), also known as Imagawa Ryōshun (今川 了俊), was a renowned Japanese poet and military commander who served as tandai ("constable") of Kyūshū under the Ashikaga bakufu from 1371 to 1395. His father, Imagawa Norikuni, had been a supporter of the first Ashikaga shōgun, Ashikaga Takauji, and for his services had been granted the position of constable of Suruga Province (modern-day Shizuoka Prefecture). This promotion increased the prestige of the Imagawa family (a warrior family dating from the Muromachi period, which was related by blood to the Ashikaga shoguns) considerably, and they remained an important family through to the Edo period.

== Sadayo's early life ==
During his early years Sadayo was taught Buddhism, Confucianism and Chinese, archery, and the military arts such as strategy and horse-back riding by his father (governor of the Tōkaidō provinces Tōtōmi and Suruga), along with poetry, which was to become one of his greatest passions. In his twenties he studied under Tamemoto of the Kyogoku school of poetry, and Reizei Tamehide of the Reizei school. At some point, he was appointed to head the boards of retainers and coadjudicators. He had taken religious vows when the Ashikaga bakufu called upon him to travel to Kyūshū and assume the post of constable of the region in 1370 after the failure of the previous constable to quell the rebel uprisings in the region, largely consisting of partisans of the Southern Court supporting one of the rebellious Emperor Go-Daigo's sons, Prince Kaneyoshi. By 1374–1375, Sadayo had crushed the rebellion, securing for the Bakufu northern Kyūshū, and ensuring the eventual failure of the rebellion and the consequent success of the Bakufu Shogunate.

=== Kyūshū Tandai (1371–1395) ===
Sadayo's skill as a strategist was obvious, and he moved rapidly through northern Kyūshū with a great deal of success, bringing the region under his control by October 1372. This was an impressive achievement considering Prince Kaneyoshi had been fortifying his position in this region for more than a decade. Kaneyoshi was not defeated outright however, and went on the defensive, leading to a stalemate that lasted through to 1373, when Kaneyoshi's general, Kikuchi Takemitsu, died, leaving his military with no strong leader. Sadayo seized the opportunity and planned a final attack.

Sadayo met with three of the most powerful families on Kyūshū to gain their support in the attack, those families being the Shimazu, the Ōtomo and the Shōni. Things seemed to be going well until Sadayo suspected the head of the Shoni family of treachery and had him killed at a drinking party. This outraged the Shimazu clan, who had originally been the ones to convince the Shōni to throw their lot in with Sadayo, and they returned to their province of Satsuma to raise a force against Sadayo. This gave Prince Kaneyoshi time to regroup, and he forced Sadayo back North, prompting Sadayo to request assistance from the Bakufu.

Sadayo took matters into his own hands, but was aided by his son Yoshinori and his younger brother Tadaaki. Sadayo continued to push the loyalists forces until their resistance ended with Prince Kaneyoshi's death in 1383. The death of Shimazu clan chieftain Ujihasa in 1385 also helped ease tensions between Sadayo and the Shimazu for a time. In 1377, Korean diplomat Chŏng Mong-ju arrived in Japan with complaints about the raids of wokou - Japanese pirates striking from bases on Kyūshū and other southern isles of Japan. Sadayo defeated many of the pirate bands and returned captured civilians and property to Korea.

In 1395 both the Ōuchi and Ōtomo families conspired against Sadayo, informing the Bakufu that he was plotting against the shōgun, in a move that was likely an attempt to restore the post of constable to the family that had held it prior to Sadayo, the Shibukawa family. Sadayo was relieved of his post and returned to the capital. Sadayo had, in addition, acted fairly independently in his negotiations with the Shimazu, the Ōtomo and the Shōni, and also in negotiations with Korea about the wokou; this recall was prompted by all three causes being used against him by his enemies in the Shogun's court.

== Later years (1395–1420) ==
In 1400 Sadayo was once again questioned by the Bakufu, this time in relation to the Imagawa's province of Tōtōmi's failure to respond to a levy issued by the Bakufu—a negligence interpretable as treason and rebellion. This charge saw Sadayo stripped of his post as constable of Suruga and Tōtōmi provinces, and gave him reason to believe he might be assassinated. With this in mind he fled the capital for a time, though was later pardoned and returned to the capital, spending the rest of his days pursuing religious devotions and poetry until his death in 1420.

== Sadayo's poetry ==
Sadayo began composing poetry from an early age: by the age 20, he had a poem included in an imperial anthology (the Fūga Wakashū or "Collection of Elegance"; Earl Miner gives the specific entry as XV: 1473). His teacher was Reizei no Tamehide (d. 1372). His poems were displayed to more effect in his fairly popular and influential travel diary, Michiyukiburi ("Travellings"). It was this travel diary that in large part won Sadayo a place as a respected critic of poetry: he felt that poetry should be a direct expression of personal experience, a fact that can be seen from his own poems.

Even though Sadayo is better known for his criticism of the more conservative poetry styles, the Nijo school in particular, and his tutoring of Shōtetsu (1381–1459), who would become one of the finest waka poets of the fifteenth century, than he is for his own output, it nonetheless provides a glimpse into the mind of this medieval scholar and his travels.

Sadayo was active in the poetic disputes of that day, scoring a signal victory over the Nijō adherents close to the Ashikaga Shogunate at the time with 6 polemical treatises on poetry he wrote between 1403 and 1412, defending the Reizei's poetic doctrine and their cause (despite Ryōshun's renga poetry's debt to Nijō Yoshimoto's (1320–1388) examples and rules of composition). Ryōshun used a number of quotations to bolster his case, including notably a quote of Fujiwara no Teika's, which was that all of the "ten styles" (Teika had defined ten orthodox poetic styles, such as yoen, a style concerned with "ethereal beauty", yūgen, the demon-quelling style, or the one the Nijo championed to the exclusion of the other 9, ushin) were licit for poetic use and experimentation, and not merely the Nijō's ushin. With the aid Ryōshun afforded him, Fujiwara no Tanemasa's politicking eventually succeeded in converting the Shogun, ending the matter- until the rival Asukai poetic clan revived the dispute, that is.

=== Select poems ===
Japanese	English
Chiru hana o Semete tamoto ni Fukitomeyo So o dani kaze no Nasake to omowan.	The least it could do Is blow the scattering blossoms into my sleeves – Then I could at least believe The wind has some compassion.

Japanese	English
Nami no ue ni Shio yaku ka to Mietsuru wa Ama no obune ni Taku hi narikeri.	What had looked like fires Tended by seaweed burners Out on the waves Turned out to be torches aflame On the boats of fishermen.

Japanese	English
Uchikawasu Tomone nariseba Kusamakura Tabi no umibe mo Nani ka ukaran.	Oh, to share the light In talking with these fisher-poets- For then the miseries Pressing the pillow-grass of travel Would no longer wash my seaside path.
