= Kawano Michiari =

Japanese warrior (1250–1311)

Kawano Michiari (河野 通有; 1250 – 1311) (otherwise known as Kōno Michiari) was a mid-Kamakura period warrior from Ishii-gō, Kume District, Iyo Province (present-day Matsuyama, Ehime Prefecture). He was a gokenin of the Kamakura shogunate, head of the Kōno clan, and a naval commander of the Iyo suigun who distinguished himself during the Mongol invasions of Japan.

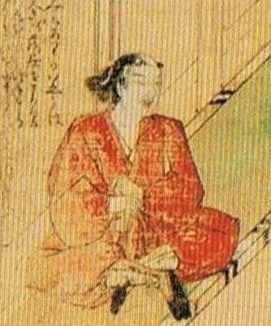
Michiari in the Mōko Shūrai Ekotoba
