= Mōko Shūrai Ekotoba =

Set of Japanese illustrated handscrolls

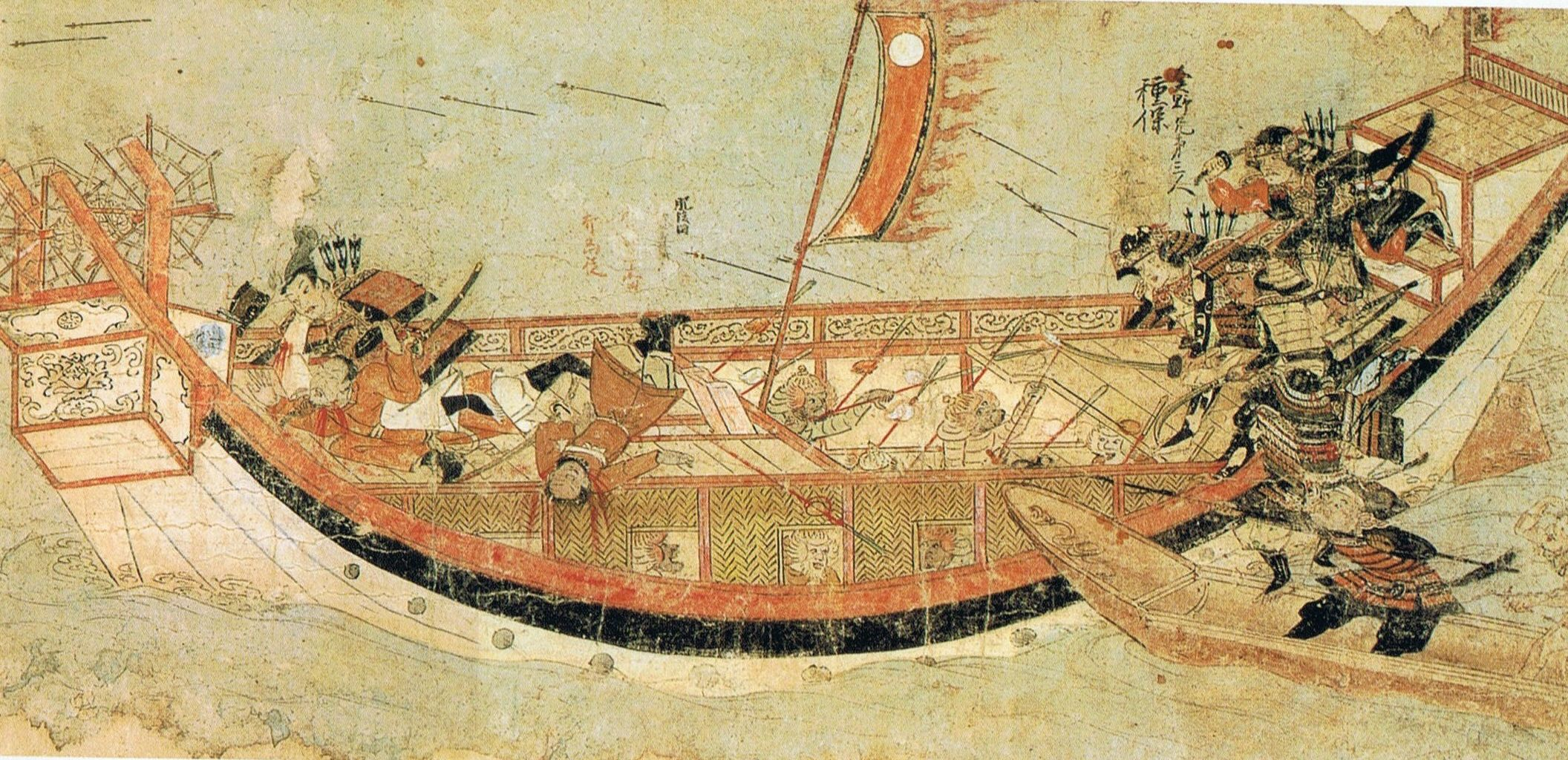
Japanese soldiers boarding a Mongol vessel during the Battle of Kōan, as depicted in the second scroll. The samurai Takezaki Suenaga is shown on the left, fighting on the deck.

Mōko Shūrai Ekotoba (蒙古襲来絵詞, Illustrated Account of the Mongol Invasion) is a set of two Japanese illustrated handscrolls (emaki) commissioned by the samurai Takezaki Suenaga (1246–1314) as a record of his wartime deeds and valor during the Mongol invasions of Japan. The first scroll describes Suenaga's actions at the Battle of Bun'ei (1274), as well as his attempts to seek recognition and rewards from the government. The second scroll describes him at the naval Battle of Kōan (1281).

The work dates itself to 1293, while scholars similarly believe it was composed between the late 13th century and early 14th century, during the Kamakura period. Their author and artist are unknown, though one scholarly hypothesis, based on the historical account of Ōyano Jurō, attributes the scrolls to the court painters Tosa Nagataka and his son Naga-aki.- Together, the scrolls contain some of the earliest artistic depictions of the Mongol invasions of Japan. Both scrolls are currently kept in the Museum of the Imperial Collections at Tokyo Imperial Palace.

== Contents ==
The scrolls alternate between written accounts and illustrations done in the yamato-e style. Belonging to the narrative yamato-e tradition, the scrolls can be read as an example of otoko-e. ("men's painting") for their martial subject matter and dynamic character. They focus on the actions of Takezaki Suenaga, a gokenin (shogun's vassal) from Hizen Province, depicting him and other Japanese troops in battle against the Mongol invaders, on land and at sea. Aside from scenes of combat, the text also gives insight into the Kamakura government's system of rewarding distinguished warriors, as well as the relationship between Suenaga and his benefactor, general Adachi Yasumori.

=== First scroll ===
In the first scroll, twenty-nine year old Suenaga and his clansmen meet with commander Saburō Kagesuke, who would later testify in his favor before the government. They gather their forces, and travel to Hakata to meet the Mongol invaders, passing the torii gates of Hakozaki Shrine on the way.

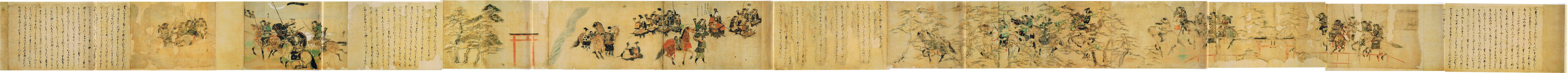
Scroll 1, part 1

Suenaga and his brother-in-law, Mitsui Sukenaga, encounter a group of Mongol soldiers and force them to retreat. Suenaga then meets and fights against the main Mongol army at the Battle of Bun'ei, where he and his flagbearer are both dismounted after their horses were shot. The scrolls contain one of the earliest visual records of the use of black-powder bombs in medieval Japan, in connection with the Mongol invasions. Facing Mongol arrows and explosives, Suenaga is saved by a cavalry charge led by Shiraishi Michiyasu, another samurai.

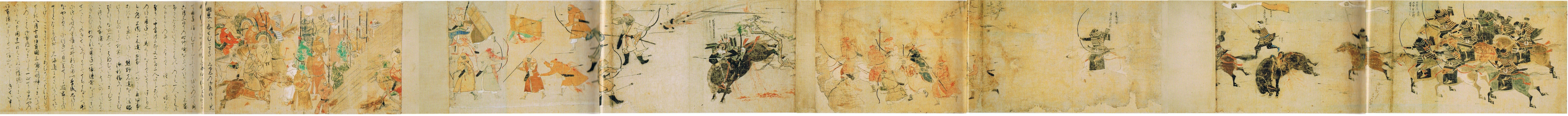
Scroll 1, part 2

After the battle, Suenaga travels to the capital city of Kamakura, dissatisfied that he had not been rewarded by the government for his valor in combat. On the way, he visits several shrines and makes offerings. At Kamakura, he meets with many government officials to appeal his case. They ignore him due to a lack of evidence, despite testimony from Suenaga's fellow warriors. At last, after a personal appeal to general Adachi Yasumori, Suenaga's military service is certified in writing, and he is awarded a fully equipped horse, as well as a plot of land in Higo Province.

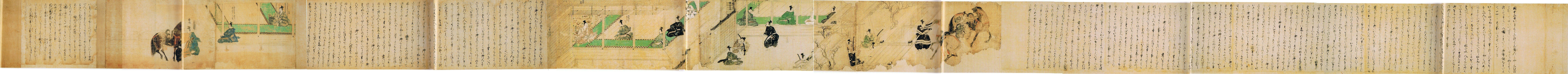
Scroll 1, part 3

=== Second scroll ===
In the second scroll, Suenaga travels to Iyo Province to visit the house of Kawano Michiari, another samurai who fought the Mongols earlier on Shika Island. The two men discuss the state of the war. Suenaga then sets out with the samurai Kikuchi Takefusa, joining the other Japanese defenders in front of the defensive wall at Hakata Bay.

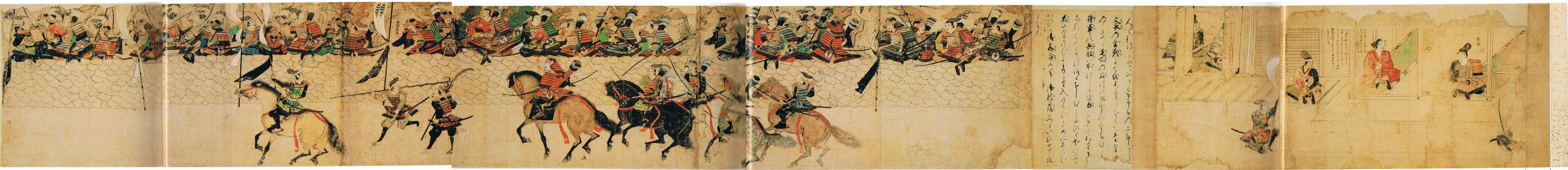
Scroll 2, part 1

Suenaga and his company intend to attack the Mongols at sea, but they have difficulty finding a ship. He tries to board the ship of general Adachi Yorimune (Yasumori's son), but is turned away. Finally, he finds a boat at Iki Island. He removes his helmet and sets out on a transport ship with other warriors, boarding a Mongol vessel at the Battle of Kōan, where he engages in close quarters combat on the deck.

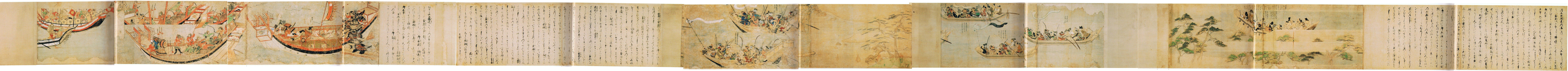
Scroll 2, part 2

Suenaga and his men cut off the heads of their enemies, presenting them to Adachi Morimune as evidence of their deeds. In the colophon, Suenaga personally expresses gratitude towards Adachi Yasumori for recognizing his accomplishments and bestowing rewards upon him. He then praises a Shinto kami that he had prayed to, stating that he saw the deity land on a cherry tree in a dream, a sign that the kami was responsible for him receiving the recognition he deserved.

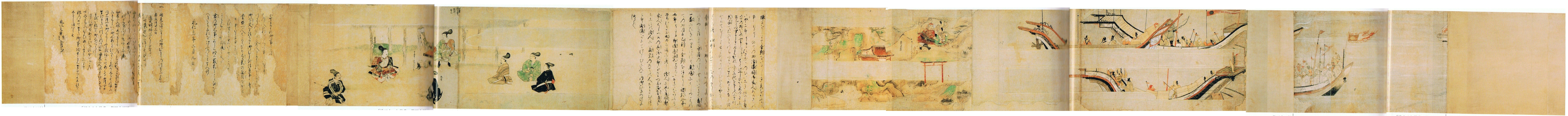
Scroll 2, part 3

== Textual history ==
The date of composition is recorded at the end of the second scroll as "the first year of the Einin era", or 1293 CE. However, the illustrations have been modified many times after its completion, with additions, alterations, and retouching. Both scrolls were lost at some point, and only rediscovered in the 18th century.

=== Copies ===
Several copies of the scrolls exist:

- An 18th-century copy
- A 19th-century copy made by Fukuda Taika
- A 21st-century reconstruction

== Details of characters ==
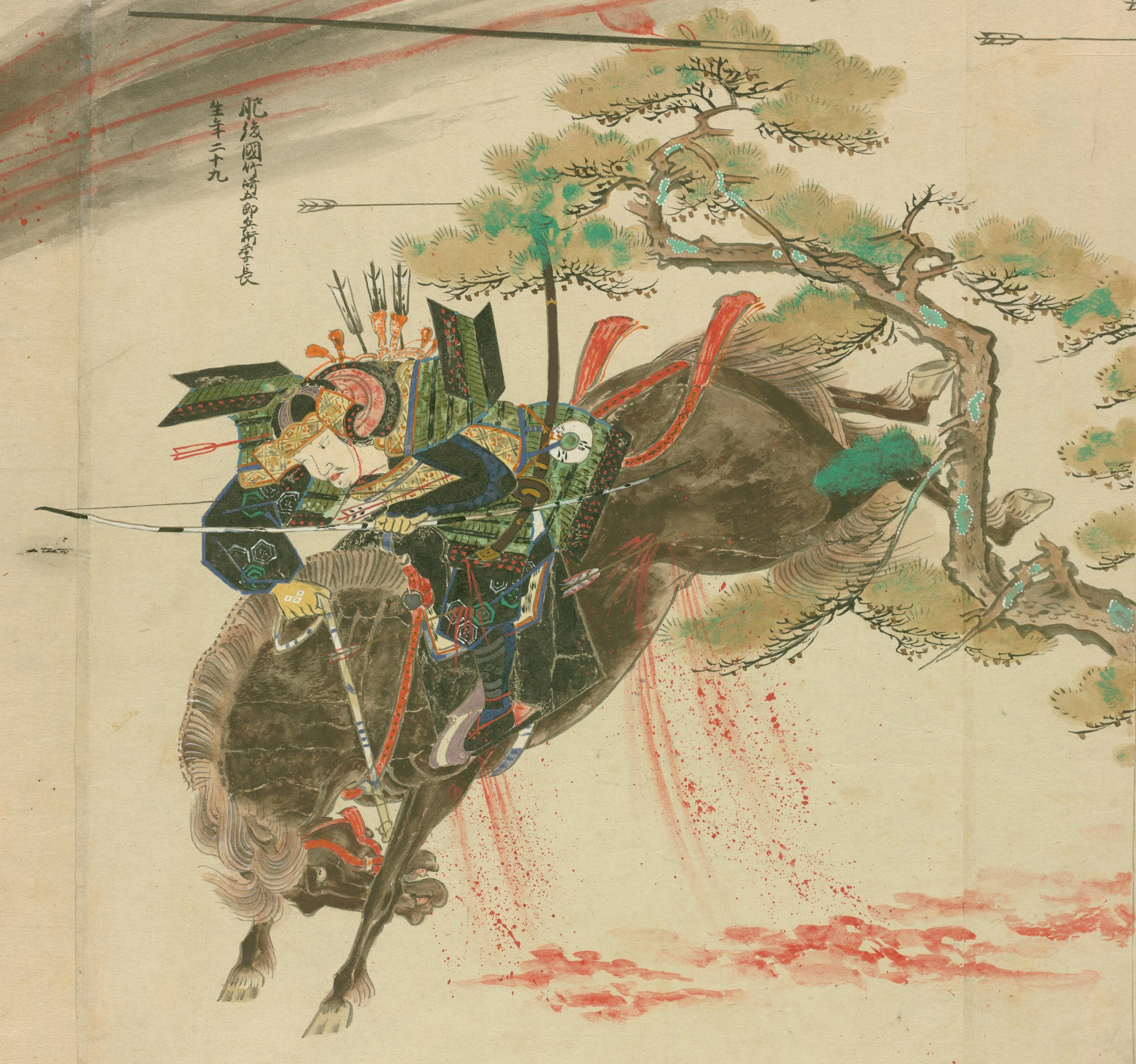
The warrior Takezaki Suenaga

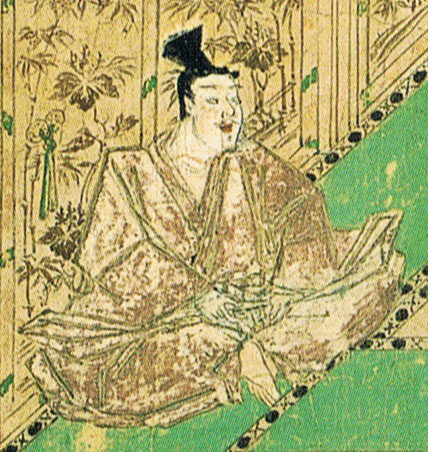
General Adachi Yasumori

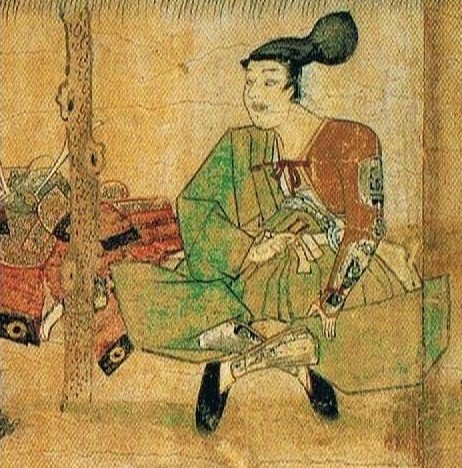
General Adachi Morimune (Yasumori's son)

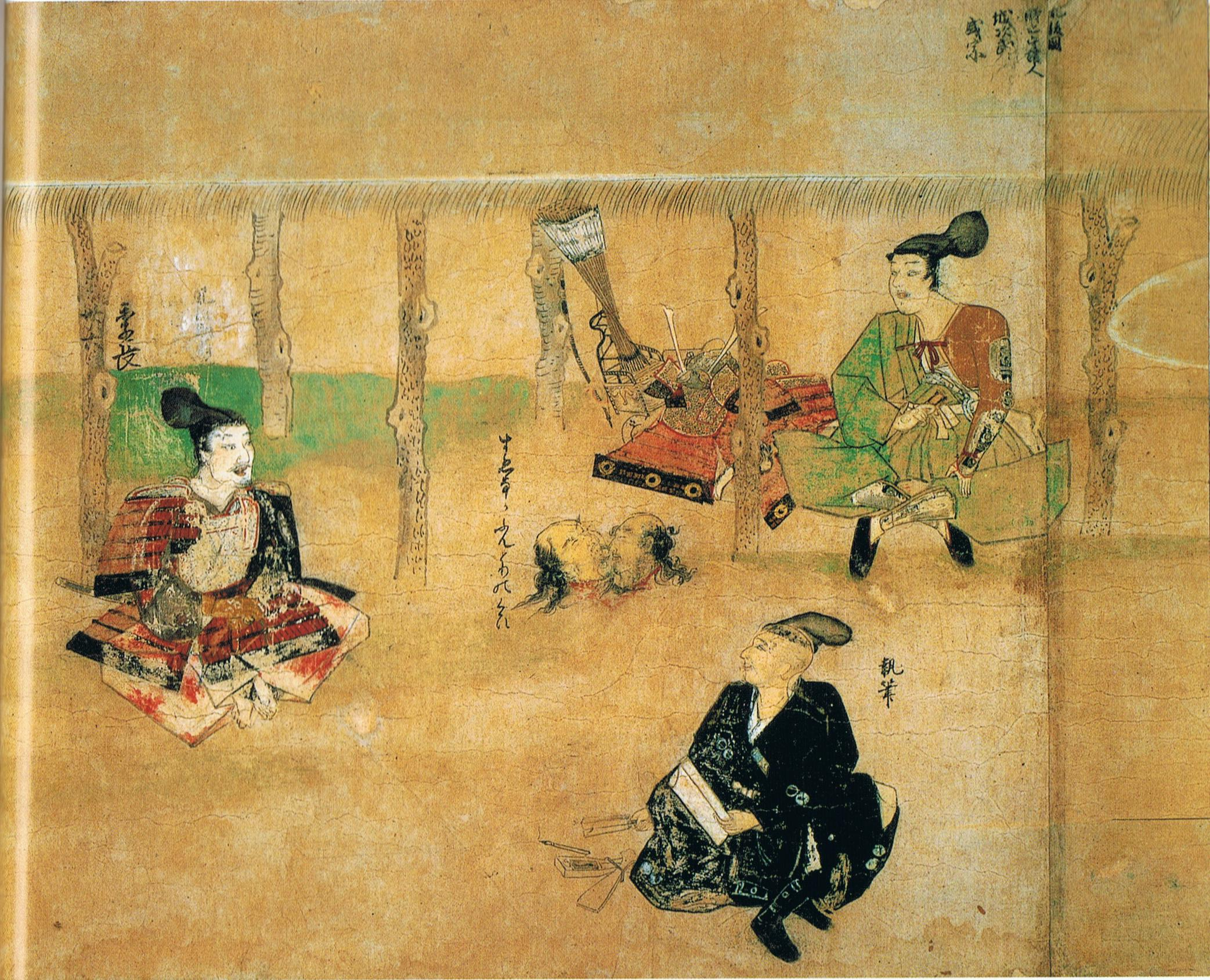
Suenaga presenting enemy heads to Adachi Morimune

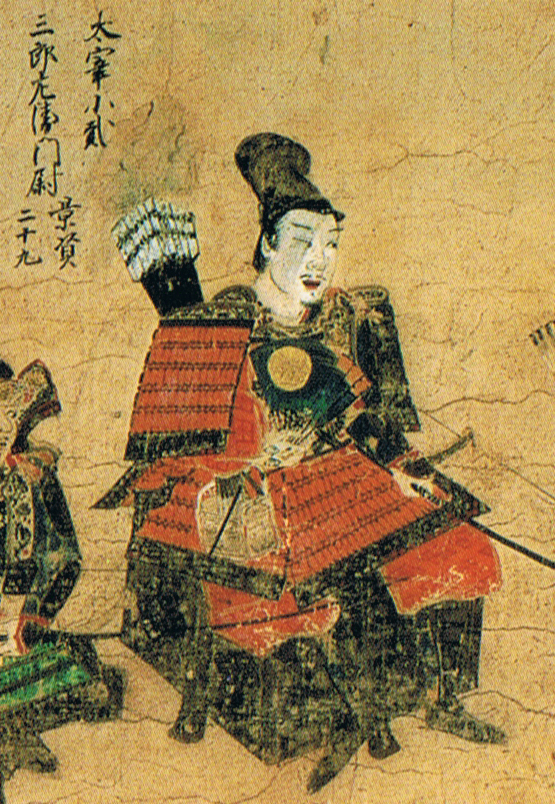
The warrior Saburō Kagesuke

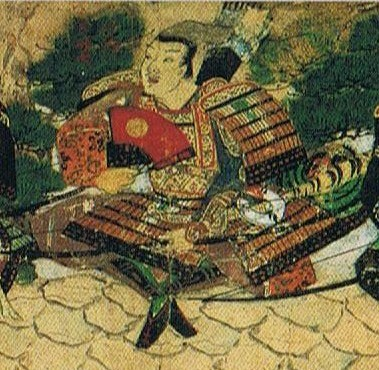
The warrior Kikuchi Takefusa

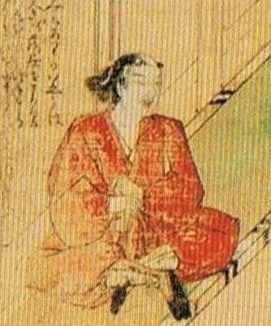
The warrior Kawano Michiari

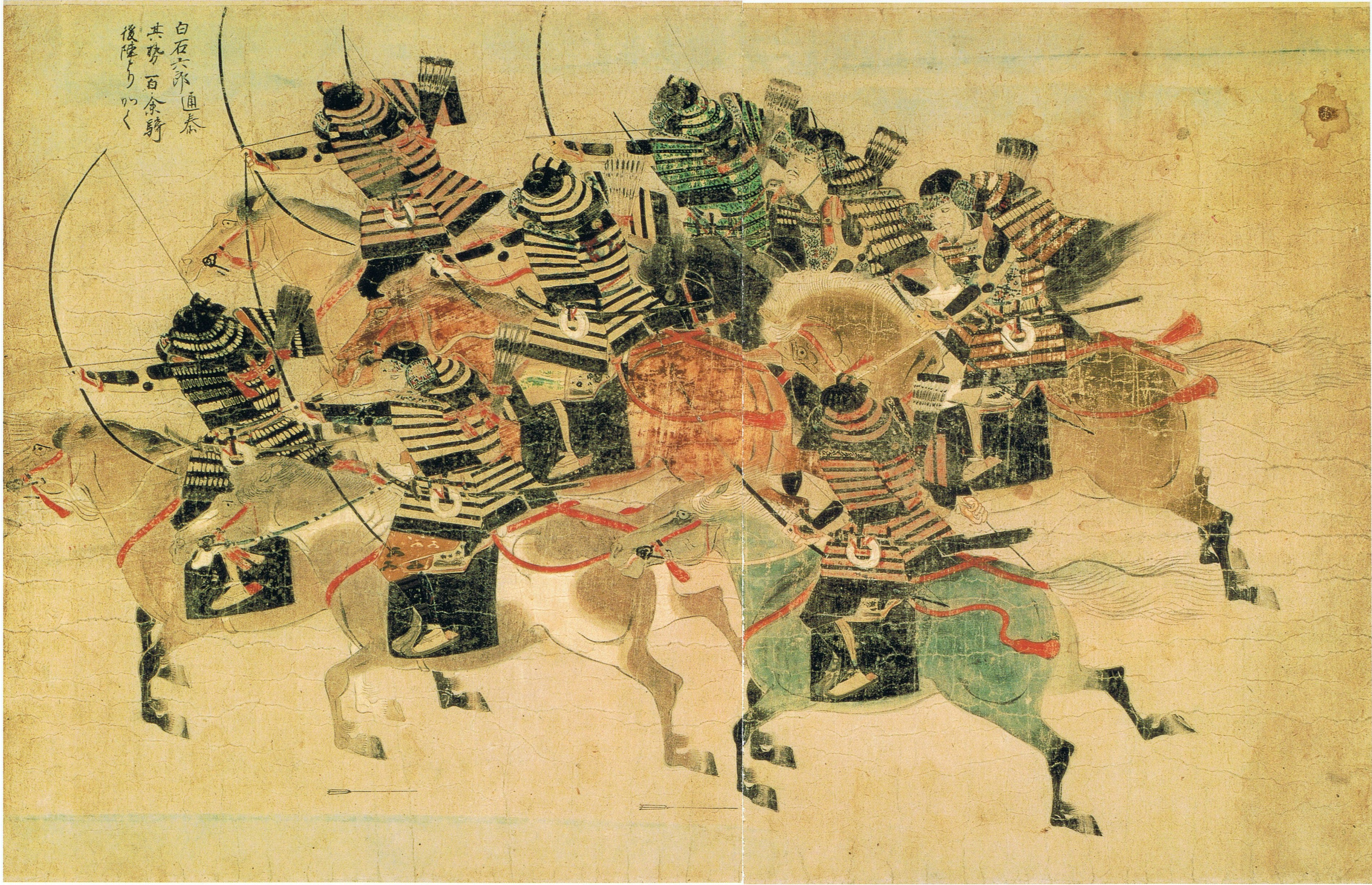
The cavalry of Shiraishi Michiyasu, riding to Suenaga's rescue

== See also ==
- Takezaki Suenaga
- Battle of Bun'ei
- Battle of Kōan
- Mongol Invasions of Japan
- List of National Treasures of Japan (paintings)

== Bibliography ==
- Okudaira, Hideo (1973). Narrative picture scrolls. Arts of Japan. Vol. 5. Weatherhill. ISBN 978-0-8348-2710-3.
- Conlan, Thomas (2001). In little need of divine intervention: Takezaki Suenaga's scrolls of the Mongol invasions of Japan. Cornell East Asia series. Vol. 113. Cornell University. ISBN 978-1-885445-13-1.
- Tanaka, Ichimatsu (1964). Heiji monogatari emaki, Mōko shūrai ekotoba. Nihon emakimono zenshū (in Japanese). Vol. 9. Kadokawa Shoten.
- Komatsu, Shigemi (1978). 蒙古襲来絵詞 (Mōko shūrai ekotoba). Nihon emaki taisei (in Japanese). Vol. 14. Chuokoron-Shinsha.
