= Yatsushiro-gū =

Shinto shrine in Kumamoto Prefecture, Japan

Yatsushiro Shrine
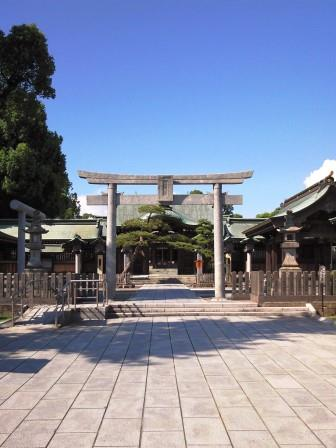
- Yatsushiro Shrine

- Location within Japan

Religion
- Affiliation: Shinto
- Deity: Prince Kaneyoshi

Location
- Interactive map of Yatsushiro Shrine
- Coordinates: 32.5077°N 130.5996°E

Yatsushiro-gū (八代宮, Yatsushiro-gū) is a Shinto shrine located in Yatsushiro, Kumamoto Prefecture, Japan. Its main festival is held annually on August 3. It was founded in 1884, and enshrines the kami of Prince Kaneyoshi. It is one of the Fifteen Shrines of the Kenmu Restoration.

In the former Modern system of ranked Shinto Shrines, it was an imperial shrine of the second rank (官幣中社, Kanpei-chūsha).

The shrine's worship hall collapsed in the 2026 Kumamoto earthquake on 28 July.

== See also ==
- Fifteen Shrines of the Kenmu Restoration
