= Kikuchi Shrine =

Shinto shrine in Kumamoto Prefecture, Japan

Kikuchi Shrine 菊池神社
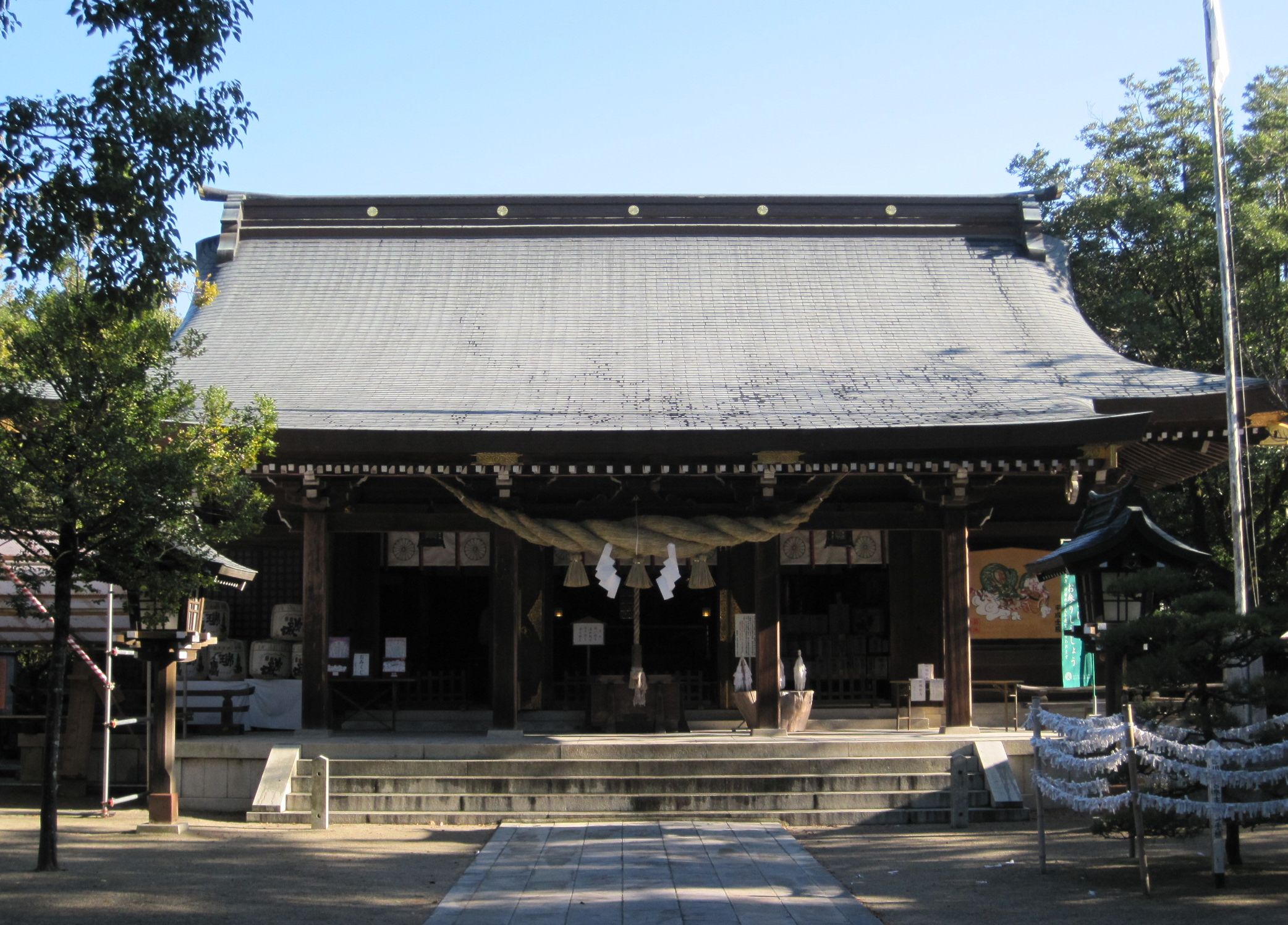
- Kikuchi Shrine

- Location within Japan

Religion
- Affiliation: Shinto
- Deity: Kikuchi Taketoki, Kikuchi Takeshige, Kikuchi Takemitsu
- Type: Bekkaku Kanpeisha,別格官幣社

Location
- Location: 1257, Waifu, Kikuchi-shi, Kumamoto Prefecture, Japan 861-1331
- Coordinates: 32°59′16″N 130°48′58″E

Architecture
- Founder: Emperor Meiji
- Established: April 28, 1870

Website
- nobyama.com/kikuchi.html

Kikuchi Shrine (菊池神社, Kikuchi Jinja) is a Shinto shrine in Kikuchi, Kumamoto Prefecture, in which Kikuchi Taketoki (菊池武時, 1292 – April 27, 1333), Kikuchi Takeshige (菊池武重, 1307?-1338?) and Kikuchi Takemitsu (菊池武光, c. 1319 – 1373) are enshrined. It is one of the Fifteen Shrines of the Kenmu Restoration.

== Another Kikuchi Shrine (Fukuoka) ==
Kikuchi Takemitsu is also enshrined in a Kikuchi shrine at 7-10-1, Nanakuma, Johnan-ku, Fukuoka where he died at war.

== History of the shrine ==
With the suggestion of Nagaoka Masami, Emperor Meiji ordered in 1868, the enshrinement of Kikuchi Taketoki, who worked for the emperors, and a shrine was built on the site of the old Kikuchi castle in Kikuchi City. Kikuchi Taketoki was enshrined on April 28, 1870. The shrine is classified as a Bekkaku Kanpeisha (shrines for those with distinguished services to the state). In March 1923, Kikuchi Takeshige and Kikuchi Takemitsu were also enshrined at the same location. In September 1952, the shrine was made a Religious corporation. In 1970, a Kumonoe-guu building and a historical museum were also built on shrine grounds. On April 28, 2000, the shrine celebrated its 130th anniversary.

== Kikuchi clan and Kikuchi Taketoki ==
The Kikuchi clan (菊池氏, Kikuchi-shi) of Higo Province was a powerful daimyō family of Higo, Kyushu. The Kikuchi lineage was renowned for its valiant service in defense of the emperor and against foreign invaders.

Kikuchi Taketoki was the 11th head of the Kikuchi clan. In 1333, Emperor Go-Daigo asked Taketoki to help him overthrow the shogunate and restore imperial rule. He was Go-Daigo's right-hand man and was awarded greatly for his loyalty. Taketoki gathered many people in Kyushu and was planning to attack the Defense Commissioner of the West Hojo Hidetoki (Akahashi Hidetoki) but their plan was leaked. Taketoki and his son Yoritaka died in the attack, but they were the forerunners of the Kenmu Restoration (1333–1336). Taketoki was buried in Fukuoka city where he died.

== Kikuchi Takeshige ==
The 12th head of the Kikuchi clan, and the eldest son of Kikuchi Taketoki. He invented the Kikuchi 1000 spears or shortened spears on long bamboo poles, a new weapon. He strengthened the bond of the Kikuchi clan by introducing the Kikuchi constitution.

== Kikuchi Takemitsu ==
He finally unified Kyushu by attacking Dazaifu. He was a staunch supporter of the Southern Court set up by Emperor Go-Daigo after the Kenmu Restoration failed.

== See also ==
- History of Kumamoto Prefecture
