= Kikuchi Takemitsu =

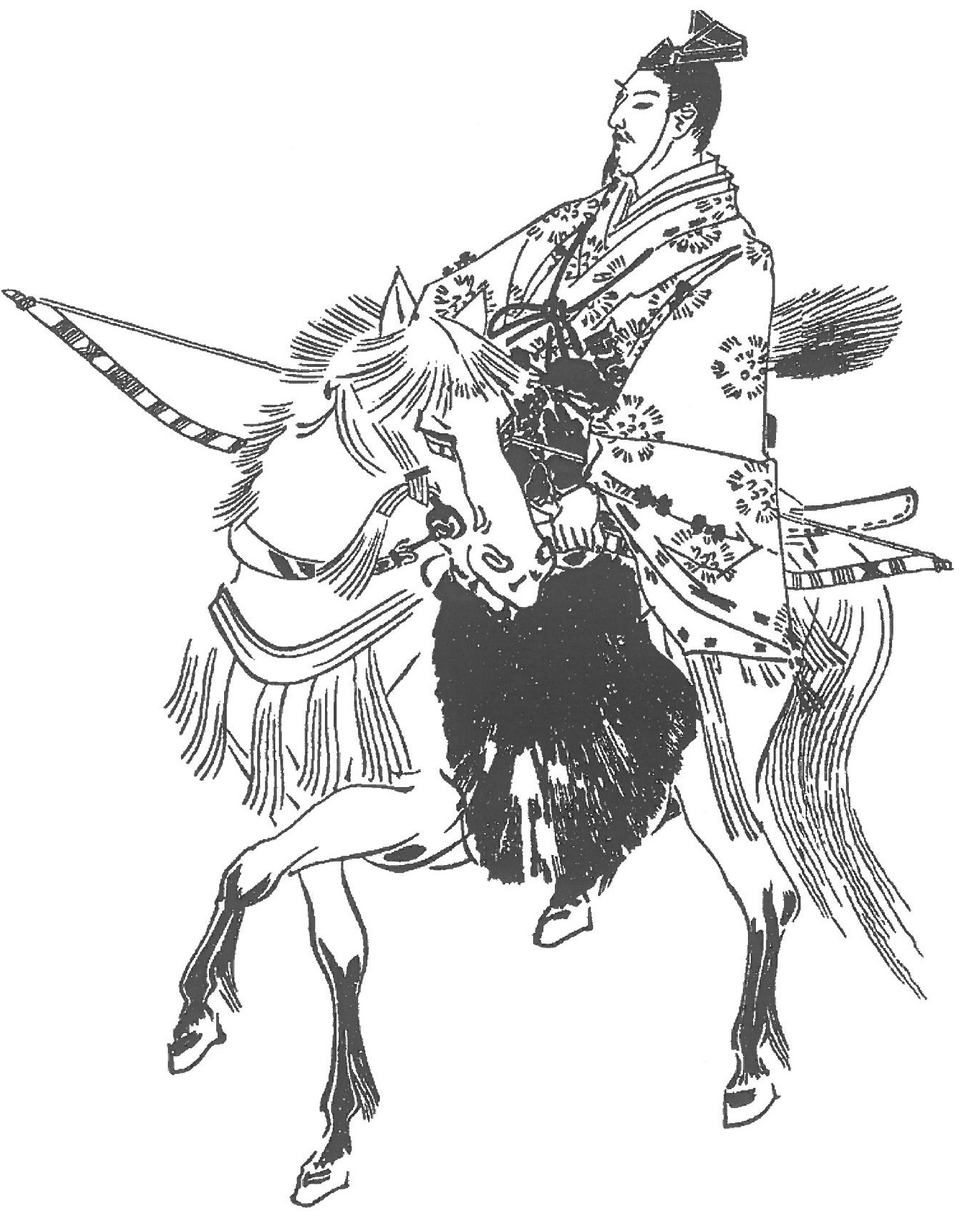
Kikuchi Takemitsu in Zenken Kojitsu

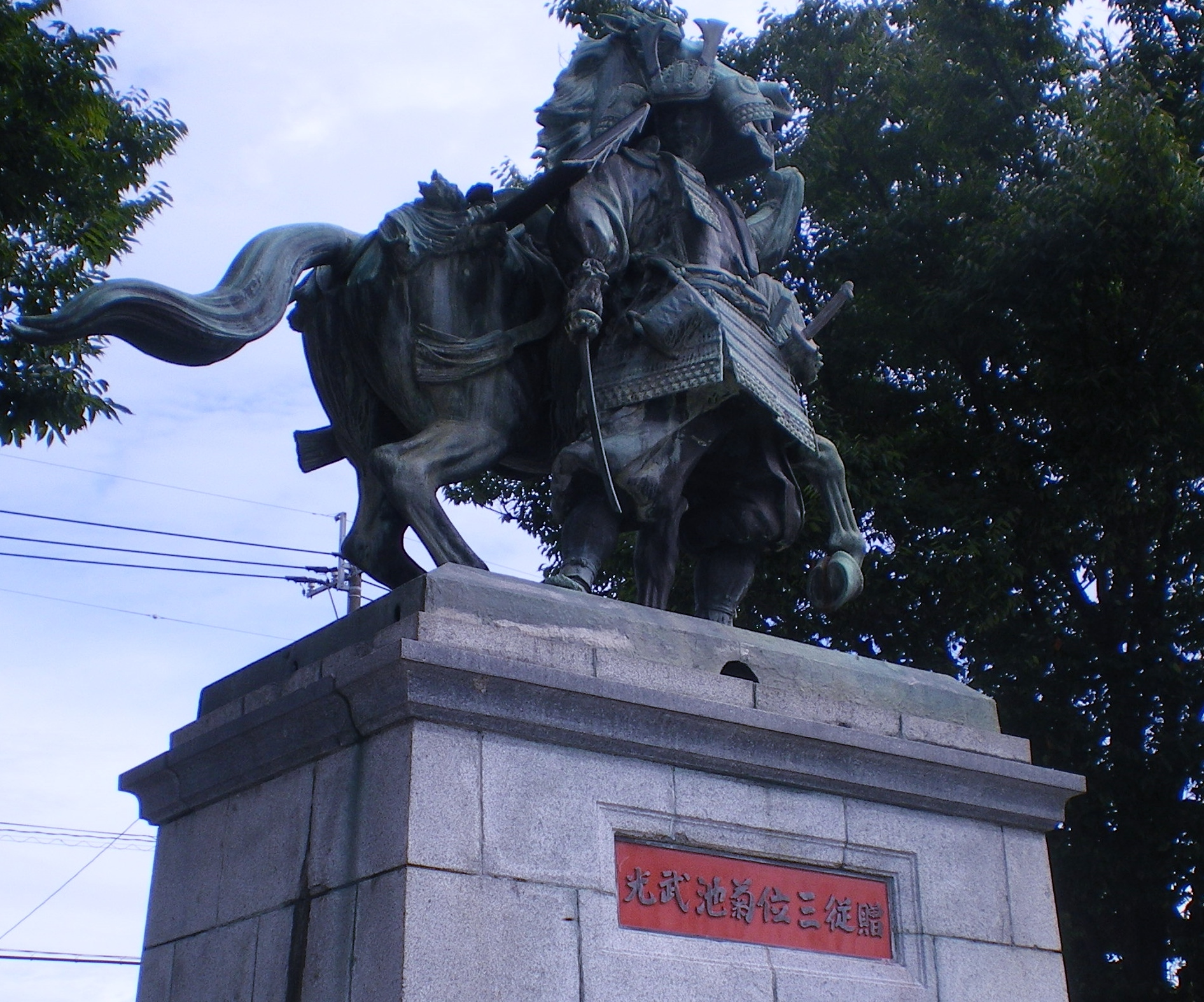
Statue of Kikuchi Takemitsu

Kikuchi Takemitsu (菊池 武光; 1319 – 1373) was a Japanese samurai lord in the Nanboku-chō period. He was the 15th head of the Kikuchi clan.

== Biography ==
Takemitsu was the 9th son of Kikuchi Taketoki, and fought on the side of Emperor Go-Daigo as his father had done, a strong and dependable ally to Prince Kaneyoshi, the son of Emperor Go-Daigo, in the struggle against the Kamakura shogunate.

His most famed battle is the Battle of Chikugogawa, fought on the banks of the Chikugo River in Kyūshū, in which he was victorious.
