= Takezaki Suenaga =

Retainer of the Higo Province, Japan

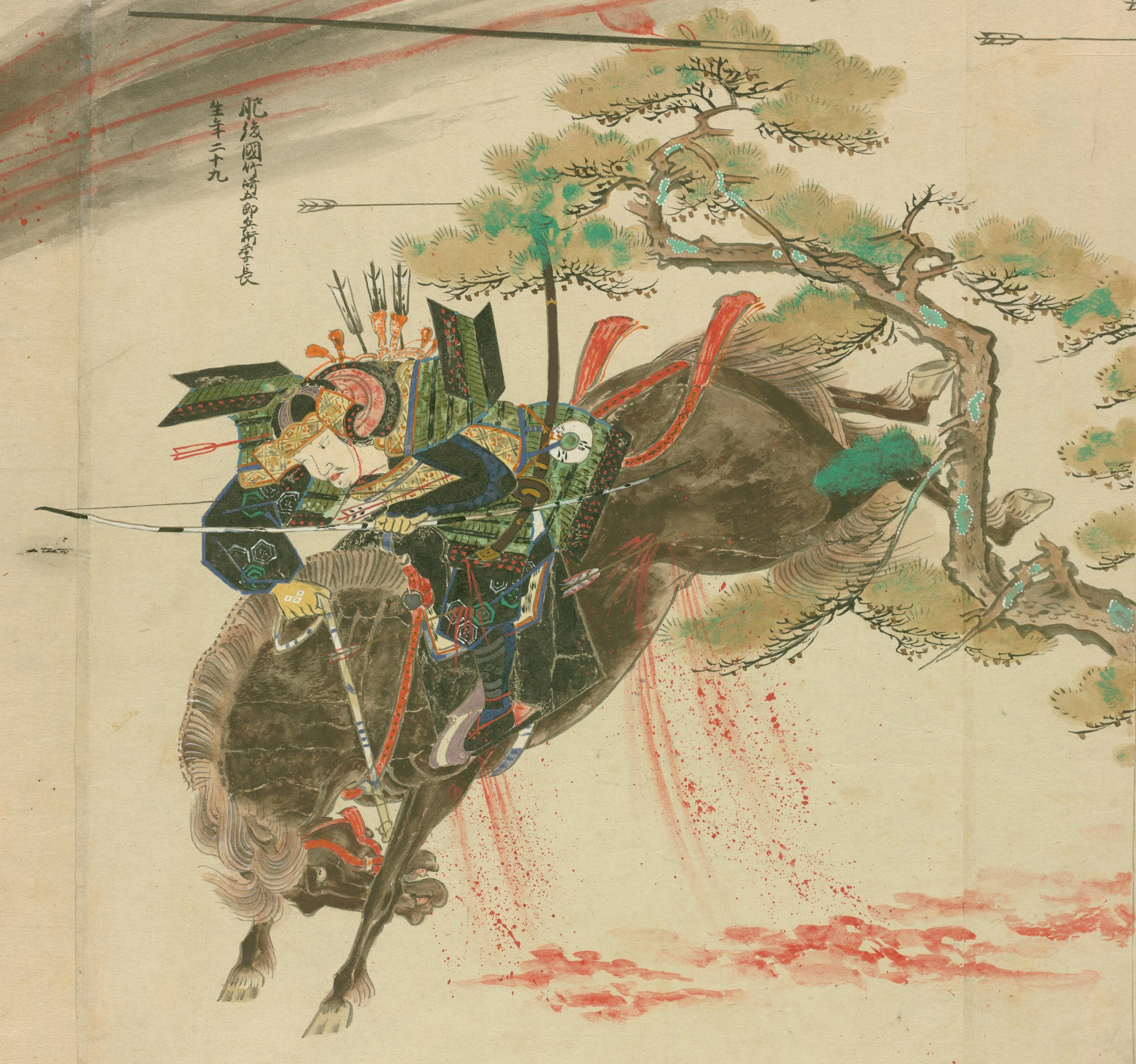
Suenaga from the Mōko Shūrai Ekotoba scroll

Takezaki Suenaga (竹崎 季長; 1246–4 March 1324) was a retainer of the Higo Province, Japan, who fought in both the Battle of Bun'ei and the Battle of Kōan during the Mongol invasions of Japan. Suenaga commissioned the Mōko Shūrai Ekotoba, an illustrated handscroll, in order to provide a pictorial account and chronicle his valor in battles against the Mongols, and to praise his commanders and the gods for his success during his campaigns.

== Fighting the Mongols ==
During the Mongol invasion of 1274, Suenaga fought at Hakata under Muto Kagesuke. Suenaga went to great lengths to achieve what he viewed as the honor of the warrior. Although under orders from Kagesuke to pull back at the beginning of the engagement, Suenaga disobeyed, saying "Waiting for the general will cause us to be late to battle. Of all the warriors of the clan, I, Suenaga will be the first to fight from Higo." He later encountered Kagesuke, whose retainer gave Suenaga a personal order to withdraw. So ordered to dismount from his horse, he refused, citing his desire to be the first into battle.

== Pursuing recognition ==
To receive rewards for valor, others had to witness the deeds and report them directly to the shogunate. As record of his performance against the Mongols authored by the local commander was not sent to the shogunate, his deeds went unrecognized. Suenaga sold his horses and saddles to pay for a trip to Kamakura to report his deeds in battle to the shogunate. His petition was successful and he later commissioned illustrated scrolls of his military prowess and his administrative grievance and its resolution in his favor.

By his own account in the scrolls, Suenaga says, "Other than advancing and having my deeds known, I have nothing else to live for," showing that, first, he wanted to advance in terms of measurable money and rank, and that, just as importantly, he sought fame and recognition.

== See also ==
- Mōko Shūrai Ekotoba
- Battle of Bun'ei
- Battle of Kōan
- Mongol Invasions of Japan
- Genko Borui
