= Battle of Kōan =

1281 failed attempt by the Mongol-led Yuan dynasty of China to invade Japan

Coordinates: 33.6251°N 130.3328°E

- Part of the Mongol invasions of Japan
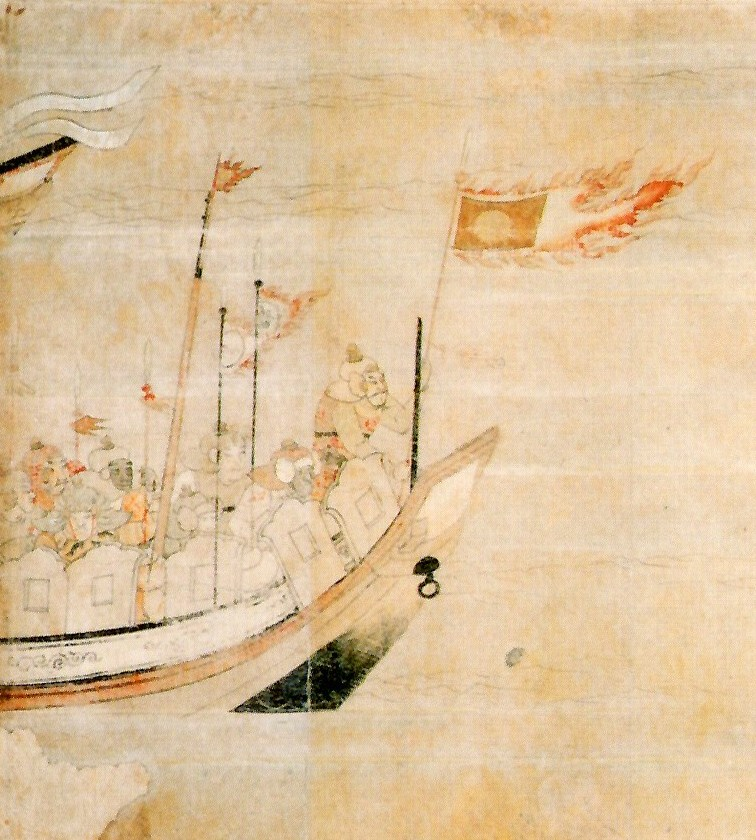
Date	8 June – 22 August 1281
Location	Hakata Bay, near present-day Fukuoka, Kyūshū
Result	Japanese victory

Belligerents
Kamakura Japan	Yuan dynasty Goryeo

The Battle of Kōan, also known as the Second Battle of Hakata Bay, was the second attempt by the Mongol-led Yuan dynasty of China to invade Japan after their failed attempt seven years earlier at the Battle of Bun'ei. In the summer of 1281, the Yuan invaded with two large armies. The Japanese defenders were aided by a major storm which sank a sizeable portion of the Yuan fleets. The invaders who reached the shore were repulsed shortly after landing. The Japanese called the opportune storm kamikaze (lit. 'divine wind'), a name later used in the Second World War for pilots who carried out aerial suicide attacks.

The first of the Southern force ships arrived on July 16, and by August 12 the two fleets were ready to attack Japan. On August 15 a major tempest struck the Tsushima Straits, lasting two full days and destroying most of the Yuan fleet. Contemporary Japanese accounts indicate that over 4,000 ships were destroyed in the storm; 80% of the Yuan soldiers either drowned or were killed by samurai on the beaches. The loss of ships was so great that "a person could walk across from one point of land to another on a mass of wreckage".

== Main battles of the Kōan Campaign ==
=== Battle of Tsushima Island ===
On June 8, the Yuan Army landed on Tsushima island. According to the History of Yuan, the Japanese commander Shōni Suketoki and Ryūzōji Suetoki led forces against the invasion force. The expeditionary forces discharged their firearms, and the Japanese were routed, with Suketoki killed in the process. More than 300 islanders were killed.

=== Battle of Shika Island ===
On June 23, unable to land in Hataka, the Yuan fleet occupied the islands of Shika and Noko from which it had planned to launch raids against Hakata. By June 24, Mongol forces had control of most of the island, but on the morning of June 25, the Japanese army divided their force into two and attacked along Umi no Nakamichi. Several clashes followed resulting in 300 casualties for the Japanese army.

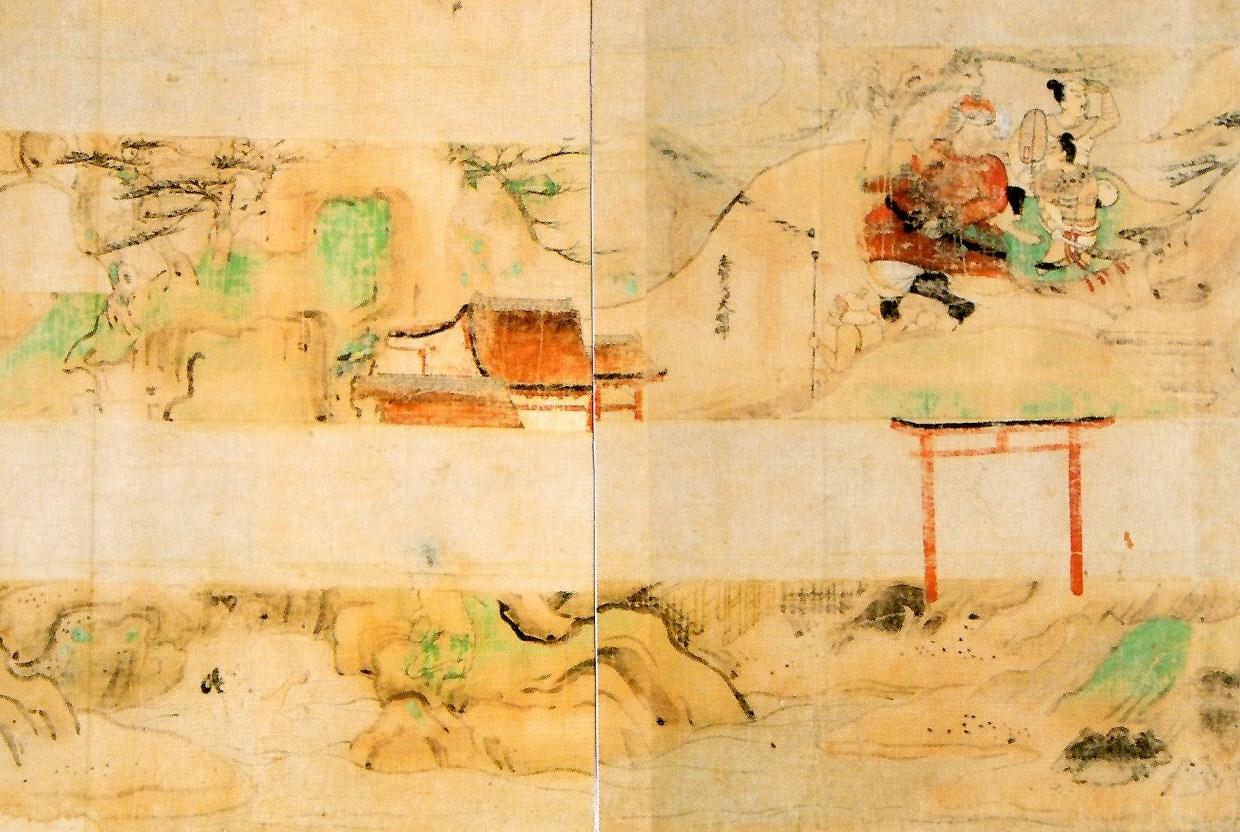
Japanese soldiers in Shika Island

On June 26, the Japanese forces launched a surprise night attack on Zhang Cheng, his unit held their position on the ships and fought through the night. By dawn, the Japanese ships retreated. The following days, the Japanese forces again assembled a large army for battle but they were routed, many were killed or wounded.

=== Battle of Iki Island ===
On July 16, a Japanese army of approximately 10,000, led by the Matsura clan, Ryūzōji clan and Takagi clan began an all-out attack on Iki Island. On July 18, Ryūzōji Iekiyo (龍造寺家清) landed on Setoura beach and defeated the Mongol army. As a result, the Mongol army abandoned Iki Island and withdrew to Hirado Island.

=== Battle of Mikuriya ===
On 15 August, a great typhoon, known in Japanese as kamikaze, struck the Yuan fleet at anchor from the west and devastated it. Sensing the oncoming typhoon, Korean and south Chinese mariners retreated and unsuccessfully docked in Imari Bay, where they were destroyed by the storm. On August 20, Takezaki Suenaga attacked the stranded ships. After this battle, most of the commanders of the Mongol army escaped to their own country.

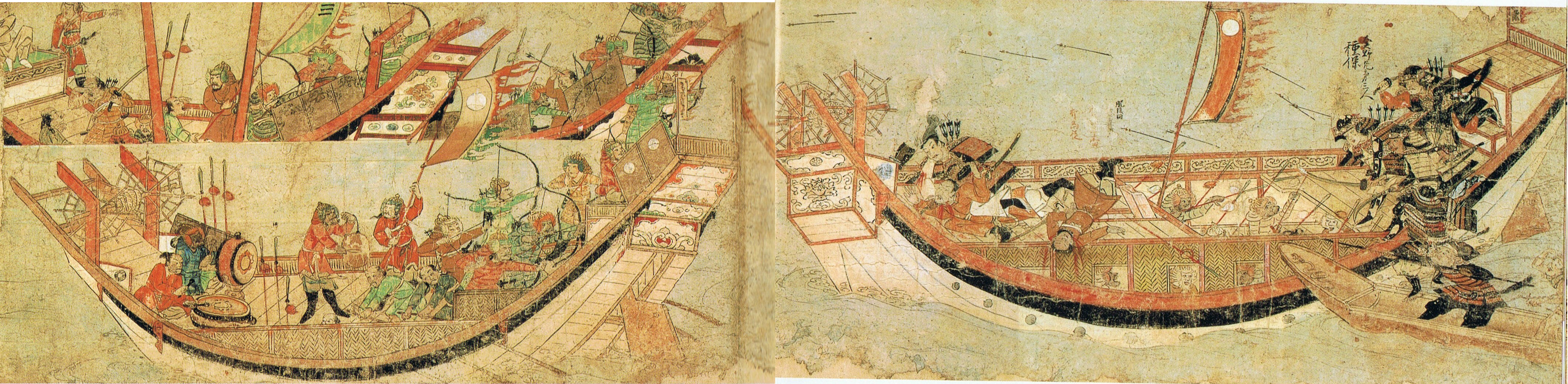
Takezaki Suenaga attacking Yuan ships in Mikuriya

=== Battle of Taka Island ===
On August 22, 100,000 soldiers of the Yuan fleet remained marooned on Taka island without commanders. Upon realizing the situation, the Japanese army launched an assault. Togō Korechika, Togō Koretō, Fujiwara no Sukekado, and Shimazu Nagahisa led the charge, successfully defeating the remaining Yuan forces. They captured between 20,000 and 30,000 prisoners during the battle, killing the rest.

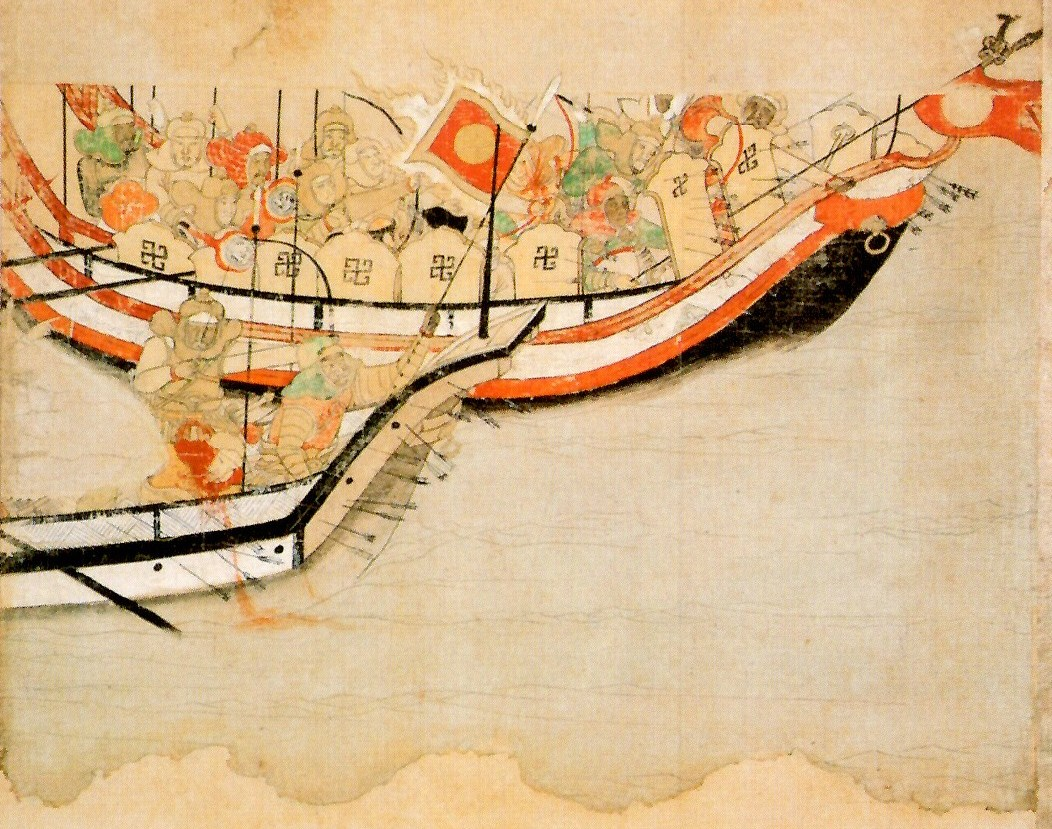
Fierce battle in Taka Island

== Aftermath ==
Kublai Khan began to gather forces to prepare for a third invasion attempt, but was soon distracted by events in Southeast and Central Asia, and no third attempt was ever made.

== See also ==
- Battle of Bun'ei - the first invasion attempt by Kublai Khan, in 1274.
- Mongol invasions of Japan
