= Battle of Bun'ei =

1274 Mongol attempted invasion of Japan

- Part of the Mongol invasions of Japan
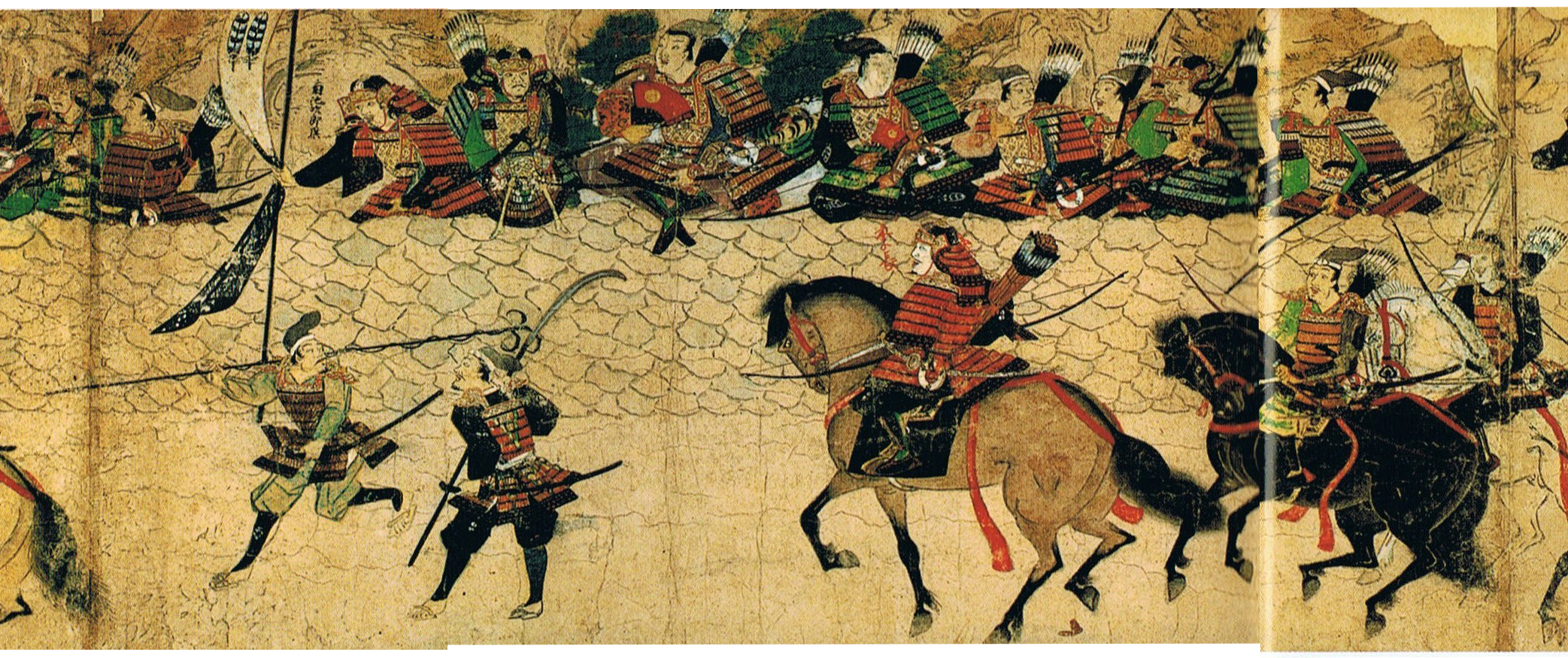
- Japanese samurai defending the stone barrier at Hakata.
Date	November 4–19, 1274
Location	Hakata Bay, near present-day Fukuoka, Kyūshū
Result	Japanese victory

Belligerents
Yuan dynasty Goryeo	Kamakura shogunate

Commanders and leaders
Hindun; Liu Fuheng; Kim Bang-gyeong	Shōni Sukeyoshi; Ōtomo Yoriyasu; Kikuchi Takefusa; Takezaki Suenaga

Strength
~40,000	~10,000

Casualties and losses
Light (before the typhoon)	Light

The Battle of Bun'ei also known as the First Battle of Hakata Bay was the first major attempt by the Mongol Empire to invade Japan. The Mongol-led force, including Mongols, Koreans, Chinese, and Jurchens, landed at Hakata Bay after raiding the nearby islands of Tsushima and Iki. Although the Mongols established positions on islands within the bay and launched attacks on the mainland, they were ultimately unable to secure a foothold and withdrew after several days. The battle demonstrated both the reach of the Mongol military and the difficulties of overseas operations in unfamiliar territory.

== Background ==
Kublai Khan had spent the 1260s attempting to secure Japanese submission, initially through diplomatic envoys and veiled threats. While Japanese chronicles often highlight the sudden arrival of the Mongol fleet and the valor of the samurai defenders, Chinese and Korean records depict a gradual escalation, including small raids, espionage, and preliminary skirmishes across the Korea Strait. The islands of Tsushima and Iki were early targets of the Mongol advance. Tsushima fell quickly, although Japanese sources largely omit this, focusing instead on Hakata Bay. Iki was poorly defended, with only a handful of armed retainers and largely untrained peasants, who retreated into local fortifications and attempted to send word to the main Japanese army.

== Battle ==
In 1274, a Mongol-led force landed at Hakata Bay on the northern coast of Kyushu, Japan. The expedition included about 5,000 Mongols, 6,000–8,000 Koreans, and 15,000 soldiers drawn from Mongol, Chinese, and Jurchen units, with roughly 15,000 crew members, nearly half Korean. The fleet raided Tsushima, Iki, and parts of Hizen province before landing at multiple points around Hakata Bay. The Mongols established positions on islands within the bay, including Shiga, connected to the mainland by a narrow spit of land. From these positions, they conducted operations against Japanese defenses over the course of about a week. Japanese forces launched night raids against Mongol ships, occasionally boarding them in small parties; while these actions inflicted losses and damage, the Mongols maintained control of their positions and continued coordinated attacks. A significant engagement occurred at Takashima, south of Iki, where Japanese forces attacked Mongol detachments in a day-and-night battle. Despite determined resistance, the Mongols, benefiting from superior numbers and organization, ultimately repelled the attack. A full-scale assault on Hakata Bay by the Mongol forces did not materialize, and after several days, the expedition withdrew. The withdrawal was influenced by logistical constraints, the difficulty of consolidating forces on the islands, and the challenges posed by coastal resistance and local conditions. Accounts indicate that Mongol and allied forces suffered casualties during the campaign, while some Japanese captives were taken. Plans for a further invasion between 1283 and 1285, which included the construction of counterweight trebuchets, were cancelled, preventing the completion of what may have become a unique military experiment. The events at Hakata Bay illustrate the operational reach of the Mongol military while also highlighting the difficulties of overseas campaigns in unfamiliar terrain.

== Aftermath ==
Although the Mongol landing initially overwhelmed the local defenders, the invasion did not develop into a sustained advance inland. The expeditionary force eventually withdrew to its ships. During the night, a severe storm struck the fleet, damaging or destroying a number of vessels. Because the army depended on the ships for transport and supplies, the losses forced the commanders to abandon the campaign and return to Korea. Following the invasion, Japanese leaders strengthened their defenses in anticipation of another attack. Coastal fortifications were constructed around Hakata Bay, and greater efforts were made to prepare the population for future conflict.

== Bibliography ==
- Clements, Jonathan (2010). A Brief History of Khubilai Khan. Robinson (London) / Running Press (Philadelphia). ISBN 9781849013376.
- Turnbull, Stephen (2003). Genghis Khan & the Mongol conquests 1190-1400. Osprey.
- Davis, Paul K. (1999). 100 Decisive Battles: From Ancient Times to the Present. New York: Oxford University Press. ISBN 9780195143669.
