= Prince Kaneyoshi =

Japanese noble (c. 1329–1383)

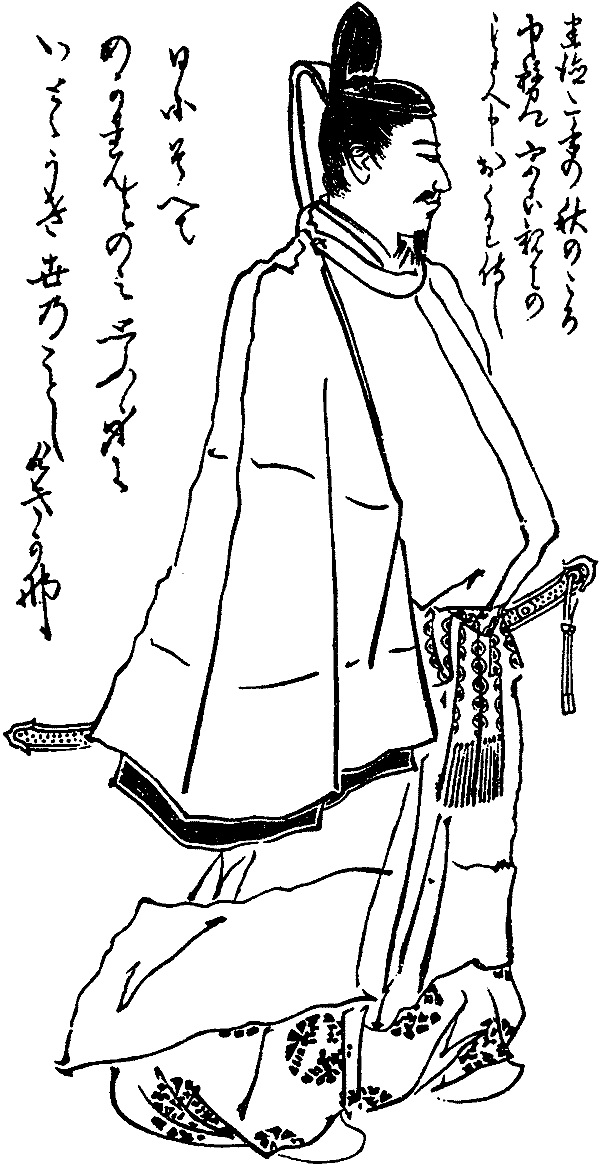

Sēsētaishōgun
- Reign: 1336-1372
- Successor: Prince Yoshinari
- Born: 1329
- Died: 30 April 1383 (aged 54)
- Father: Emperor Go-Daigo
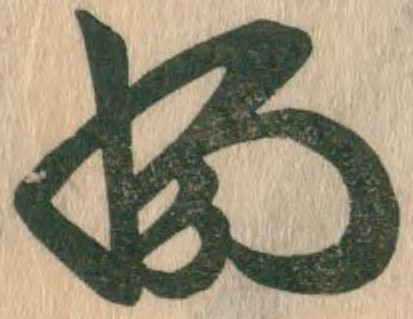
- Signature

Prince Kaneyoshi (懐良親王, Kaneyoshi shinnō or Kanenaga shinnō. Born c. 1329 – 30 April 1383) was a nobleman of the Kamakura period and the early Nanboku-chō period where power in Japan was split between two rival factions. He was the son of Emperor Go-Daigo who was head of one of the factions (the Southern Court), the other being the Ashikaga shogunate.

During his childhood, he saw the shogunate establishing its rule over the island. Later in the 1350s, a civil war occurred between the founder of the shogunate, Ashikaga Takauji and his son, Tadafuyu. When it ended, Kaneyoshi became an effective force of the Southern Court in opposition to the Ashikaga bakufu.

In 1336, Go-Daigo sent the prince, at seven years of age, to Kyushu as Chinzei Shogun (Commander-in-Chief of the Western Defense Area). However, unfortunately for the Southern Court and Kaneyoshi, by 1358 the current shogun Yoshiakira faced no immediate threat from the Southern Court's loyalist as the latter only managed to hold on to a few areas such as Shinano and Kyushu where Kaneyoshi had previously gained some ground.

By 1365, Kaneyoshi gained control of the entire island of Kyushu, at this point he was so confident that he believed he could even march an army to Kyoto, capital of the bakufu.

When Yoshiakira died, loyalist resistance weakened, and control was fully consolidated under the Ashikaga. Hosokawa Yoriyuki took Kanenaga's planned attempt to attack Kyoto seriously; the recently strengthened Ashikaga had Yoshinari land on Ōita and occupy Takasaki stronghold in 1371 but was later attacked by an ally of Kaneyoshi. Ultimately however, Kaneyoshi's base of northern Kyushu was subdued (which Kaneyoshi had struggled to build up since 1361). He then left to a plain nearby the Chikugo River.

He is enshrined at the Yatsushiro-gū, a Shinto shrine located in Yatsushiro, Kumamoto Prefecture.
