= Genkō =

Genkō may refer to:

- Genkō (first) (元亨), Japanese historical era from 1321 to 1324
- Genkō (second) (元弘), Japanese historical era from 1331 to 1334
- Genkō War (元弘の乱, genkō no ran), a civil war from 1331 to 1333 which caused the fall of the Kamakura Shogunate
- Genkō, Japanese name for Mongol invasions of Japan of 1274 and 1281
