= 1324 =

1324 in various calendars
- Gregorian calendar: 1324; MCCCXXIV
- Ab urbe condita: 2077
- Armenian calendar: 773; ԹՎ ՉՀԳ
- Assyrian calendar: 6074
- Balinese saka calendar: 1245–1246
- Bengali calendar: 730–731
- Berber calendar: 2274
- English Regnal year: 17 Edw. 2 – 18 Edw. 2
- Buddhist calendar: 1868
- Burmese calendar: 686
- Byzantine calendar: 6832–6833
- Chinese calendar: 癸亥年 (Water Pig); 4021 or 3814 — to — 甲子年 (Wood Rat); 4022 or 3815
- Coptic calendar: 1040–1041
- Discordian calendar: 2490
- Ethiopian calendar: 1316–1317
- Hebrew calendar: 5084–5085
- Hindu calendars
- Vikram Samvat: 1380–1381
- Shaka Samvat: 1245–1246
- Kali Yuga: 4424–4425
- Holocene calendar: 11324
- Igbo calendar: 324–325
- Iranian calendar: 702–703
- Islamic calendar: 723–725
- Japanese calendar: Genkō 4 / Shōchū 1 (正中元年)
- Javanese calendar: 1235–1236
- Julian calendar: 1324; MCCCXXIV
- Korean calendar: 3657
- Minguo calendar: 588 before ROC 民前588年
- Nanakshahi calendar: −144
- Thai solar calendar: 1866–1867
- Tibetan calendar: ཆུ་མོ་ཕག་ལོ་ (female Water-Boar); 1450 or 1069 or 297 — to — ཤིང་ཕོ་བྱི་བ་ལོ་ (male Wood-Rat); 1451 or 1070 or 298

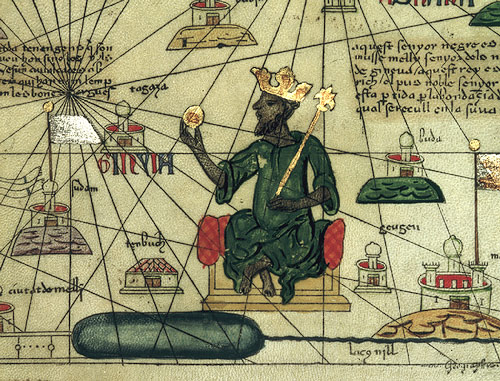
Musa I, emperor of the Mali Empire

Year 1324 (MCCCXXIV) was a leap year starting on Sunday of the Julian calendar.

== Events ==
=== January – March ===
- January 3 – The Taiding Era begins in China three months after Borjigin Yesün Temür ascends the throne.
- January 23 – England's envoy to France, Ralph Basset, and Raymond-Bernard de Montpezat, decline to obey an order to appear before King Charles IV of France to answer for the October 16 burning of Saint-Sardos. King Charles orders their properties forfeited to the crown.
- February 7 – Siege of Villa di Chiesa: Aragonese forces led by Prince Alfonso ("the Kind") capture the city of Villa di Chiesa due to attrition. The Pisan garrison surrenders after an 8-month siege. It represents the first act of the Aragonese conquest of Sardinia, for the creation of the Kingdom of Sardinia.
- February 29 – Battle of Lucocisterna: Aragonese forces led by Prince Alfonso defeat a Pisan army, which is disembarked near the area of Capoterra. During the battle, Alfonso loses some 150 knights. On the same day, a Pisan fleet (some 30 galleys) is defeated in the Gulf of Cagliari at Sardinia.
- March 23 – Pope John XXII excommunicates Louis IV (Ludwig the Bavarian), King of the Romans, as Louis has not sought papal approval during his conflict against his rival Frederick the Fair. Louis, in turn, declares the pope a heretic, because of John's opposition to the view of the absolute poverty of Christ held by some Franciscans.
- March 26 – Marie of Luxembourg, Queen of France, dies of injuries after falling from a carriage while she and King Charles IV are riding from Paris to Avignon. After her fall, she went into labor and gave birth prematurely to a child, who died shortly afterward.
- March 31 – Hugh IV becomes the new King of Cyprus upon the death of his father, King Henry II. Hugh also inherits Henry's nominal title of "King of Jerusalem".

=== April – June ===
- April 15 – The coronation of King Hugh IV of Cyprus, nephew of the late King Henry II, takes place at the Cathedral of Saint Sophia in Nicosia.
- April 20 – Boleslaw III, Duke of Wroclaw, declares his Polish duchy to be a vassal of the Holy Roman Empire as part of a defense agreement made with Louis IV, King of the Romans.
- May 3 – France's Consistori del Gay Saber holds its first annual contest to determine the best poet in the Kingdom. Arnaut Vidal de Castelnou d'Ari wins the first prize, the violeta d'aur. The contest continues for 160 years, ceasing in 1484.
- May 22 – Louis IV, King of the Romans, comes to the defense of the Spiritual Franciscans, delivering a sharp criticism of Pope John XXII, whom Louis describes as a heretic.
- June 11 – The Byzantine Empire, represented by diplomatic envoy Stephen Syropoulos, signs a treaty with the Republic of Venice, led by the Doge Giovanni Soranzo.
- June 13 – King Edward II of England dispatches his envoy, Aymer de Valence, 2nd Earl of Pembroke to France in an attempt to negotiate a peaceful end to the Saint-Sardos incident. Stopping at Saint-Riquier 10 days later, Pembroke dies of a heart attack before reaching Paris.
- June 24
  - King Charles IV of France issues an order declaring the Duchy of Aquitaine, French territory ruled by King Edward II of England, forfeited to the crown. The move comes after King Edward fails to render homage, as Duke of Aquitaine, to King Charles. A French army of 7,000 men is massed at the border of Aquitaine for an invasion.
  - Louis IV, King of the Romans, gives the Duchy of Pomerania (part of modern-day Germany and Poland) to his son, Louis, Margrave of Brandenburg, exacerbating the Brandenburg–Pomeranian conflict.

=== July – September ===
- July 5 – A royal wedding takes place in France as King Charles IV marries his cousin Joan of Évreux, the 14-year-old daughter of his uncle, Louis, Count of Évreux.
- July 11 – Pope John XXII declares that Louis IV will be deposed as King of the Romans because of his March 23 excommunication from the Roman Catholic Church. King Louis continues his reign and in the 1325 Treaty of Trausnitz makes his rival, the Habsburg claimant Friedrich, his co-king.
- July 19 – (26 Rajab 724 AH) Mansa Musa, the extraordinarily-wealthy Emperor of Africa's Mali Empire, arrives in Cairo after three days of camping by the pyramids of Giza, and brings with him a large entourage of fellow Muslim pilgrims and a vast supply of gold. Musa, who is making the pilgrimage to Mecca, meets with Egypt's Sultan al-Nasir Muhammad and stays in Cairo for three months before departing with the pilgrims on October 18.
- July 26 – Basarab I, ruler of Wallachia (part of modern-day Romania) is designated by King Charles I of Hungary (Károly Róbert) as a subject of the Hungarian crown.
- August 5 – The Blitar Regency is established on the island of Java (part of modern-day Indonesia) by Java's King Jayanegara of Majapahit.
- August 15 – The coronation of King Christopher II of Denmark (who has ruled since 1320) takes place at Vordingborg, with his son Prince Erik Christoffersen being crowned alongside him as the samkonge, a junior co-monarch.
- August 16 – In Italy, Pagano della Torre, Patriarch of Aquileia, is defeated in battle at Vaprio d'Agogna in Piedmont in his attempt to reclaim Milan from the Visconti family, and abandons further crusades.
- August 25 – War of Metz: In Western Europe, the "Four Lords", King John of Bohemia ("the Blind"), his uncle Baldwin, Archbishop of Trier, Count Edward I, Count of Bar and Frederick IV, Duke of Lorraine ("the Fighter") meet at Remich (in modern-day Luxembourg) and make plans to work jointly on besieging the city of Metz (in modern-day France).
- September 4 – James III of Majorca ("the Unfortunate") becomes the new King of Majorca, a set of islands in the Mediterranean Sea off the coast of Spain, upon the death of his uncle, King Sancho ("the Peaceful").
- September 11 – When the body of King Sancho of Majorca arrives in the French city of Perpignan for interment at the Perpignan Cathedral, a mob attacks the funeral procession and steals valuables that had accompanied the corpse.
- September 15 – War of Metz: The armies of Bohemia, Luxembourg, Bar and Lorraine under the "Four Lords" begin their siege of the walled city of Metz, capital of the Messin Republic. The attackers use a new weapon, the cannon, to fire projectiles at high speed against the city walls in order to destroy the city. The group withdraws at the end of the month after plundering the surrounding area.
- September 22 – The War of Saint-Sardos ends after Charles, Count of Valois, forces the surrender of Edmund of Woodstock, 1st Earl of Kent at La Réole, the last English fortress at the Duchy of Aquitaine. A six-month truce follows

=== October – December ===
- October 7 – (Genko 4, 19th day of 9th month) The Shōchū Incident, the plan by Japan's Emperor Go-Daigo to overthrow the Kamakura shogunate, is discovered by the shogun's security police, the Rokuhara Tandai, and persons involved (other than the Emperor) are arrested and punished.
- October 18 – (28 Shawwal 724 AH) After he and his entourage of Muslim pilgrims have stayed in Cairo for three months, the Emperor Mansa Musa of Africa's Mali Empire resumes the group's pilgrimage to Mecca
- November 3 – At Kilkenny in Ireland, Petronilla de Meath, the maidservant of Dame Alice Kyteler, becomes the first person in the British Isles to be burned at the stake as a witch. Dame Alice had been able to escape before capture.
- November 10 – Pope John XXII issues the papal bull Quia quorundam, his third major statement concerning apostolic poverty and the Fraticelli, in response to a claim that an earlier bull by Pope Nicholas III had implied that Christ and the apostles had lived without possessions. In addition, Pope John restates the doctrine of Papal infallibility, declaring that "What the Roman pontiffs have once defined in faith and morals with the key of knowledge stands so immutably that it is not permitted to a successor to revoke it."
- November 22 – In Italy, Marsilio da Carrara becomes the new Lord of Padua upon the death of his uncle, Jacopo I da Carrara.
- December 25 – The Shōchū era begins in Japan during the reign of the Emperor Go-Daigo.

=== By place ===
==== Asia Minor ====
- Ottoman Sultan Osman I dies after a 25-year reign at Bursa. He is the founder of the Ottoman Empire (first known as a Turkmen principality in the northwest of Anatolia). He is succeeded by his 43-year-old son Orhan I as the second ruler (bey), who places his residence at Söğüt in Bilecik Province (approximate date).

=== By topic ===
==== Literature ====
- Marsilius of Padua writes Defensor pacis ("The Defender of Peace"), a theological treatise arguing against the power of the clergy and in favor of a secular state.

==== Religion ====
- William of Ockham, English Franciscan friar and philosopher, is summoned from Oxford to the papal court at Avignon; either at this time or later he comes into conflict with Pope John XXII and never returns to England.

== Births ==
- March 5 – David II, king of Scotland (Clan Bruce) (d. 1371)
- August 4 – Siraj al-Din al-Bulqini, Egyptian scholar (d. 1403)
- date unknown
  - Bayan Khutugh, Mongol concubine and empress (d. 1365)
  - Catherine of Savoy, Italian noblewoman and ruler (d. 1388)
  - Constance of Sicily, Sicilian princess and regent (d. 1355)
  - Giovanni Manfredi, Italian nobleman and knight (d. 1373)
  - Louis of Durazzo, Italian nobleman and diplomat (d. 1362)
  - Tsunenaga, Japanese prince and heir-apparent (d. 1338)
  - Vettor Pisani, Venetian nobleman and admiral (d. 1380)
  - William the Rich, Marquis of Namur, French nobleman and ruler (d. 1391)

== Deaths ==
- January 8 – Marco Polo, Italian merchant and explorer (b. 1254)
- January 23 – Fulk le Strange, English nobleman and seneschal
- February 11 – Karl von Trier, German knight and Grand Master
- February 26 – Dino Compagni, Italian politician and historian
- March 26 – Marie of Luxembourg, queen of France (b. 1304)
- March 31 – Henry II of Cyprus, king of Jerusalem (b. 1270)
- May 15 – Władysław of Oświęcim, Polish nobleman and ruler
- June 23 – Aymer de Valence, English nobleman and knight
- July 16 – Yohito, former emperor of Japan (b. 1267)
- November 1 – John de Halton, English bishop
- November 3 – Petronilla de Meath, Irish maidservant (b. 1300)
- November 11 – Henry VII, Count of Schwarzburg-Blankenburg, German nobleman and ruler
- November 25 – John Botetourt, English governor and admiral
- December 24 – John III, Dutch nobleman and knight (b. 1275)
- date unknown
  - Domarat Grzymała, Polish bishop (House of Grzymała)
  - Guecellone VII, Italian nobleman (House of Da Camino)
  - Helvig of Holstein, queen consort of Sweden (b. c. 1260)
  - Irene of Brunswick, Byzantine empress consort (b. 1293)
  - Isabella of Ibelin, queen of Cyprus and Jerusalem (b. 1241)
  - Jacopo the Great, Italian nobleman and military leader
  - John II, German nobleman and knight (House of Sponheim)
  - Konoe Iehira, Japanese nobleman (Fujiwara Clan) (b. 1282)
  - Lampert Hermán, Hungarian nobleman and judge royal
  - Nijō Tamefuji, Japanese courtier, poet and writer (b. 1275)
  - Osman I, Ottoman ruler (House of Osman)
  - Ou Shizi, Chinese Confucian scholar and writer (b. 1234)
  - Robert Scales, English nobleman, peerage and politician
  - Sancho I the Peaceful, King of Majorca (b. 1274)
  - Thawun Nge, Burmese nobleman and governor (b. 1260)
  - William Liath de Burgh, Irish nobleman and politician
