= Mongol invasions of Japan =

Late 13th-century failed invasion of Kyushu

- Part of the Mongol invasion of East Asia and Kublai Khan's campaigns
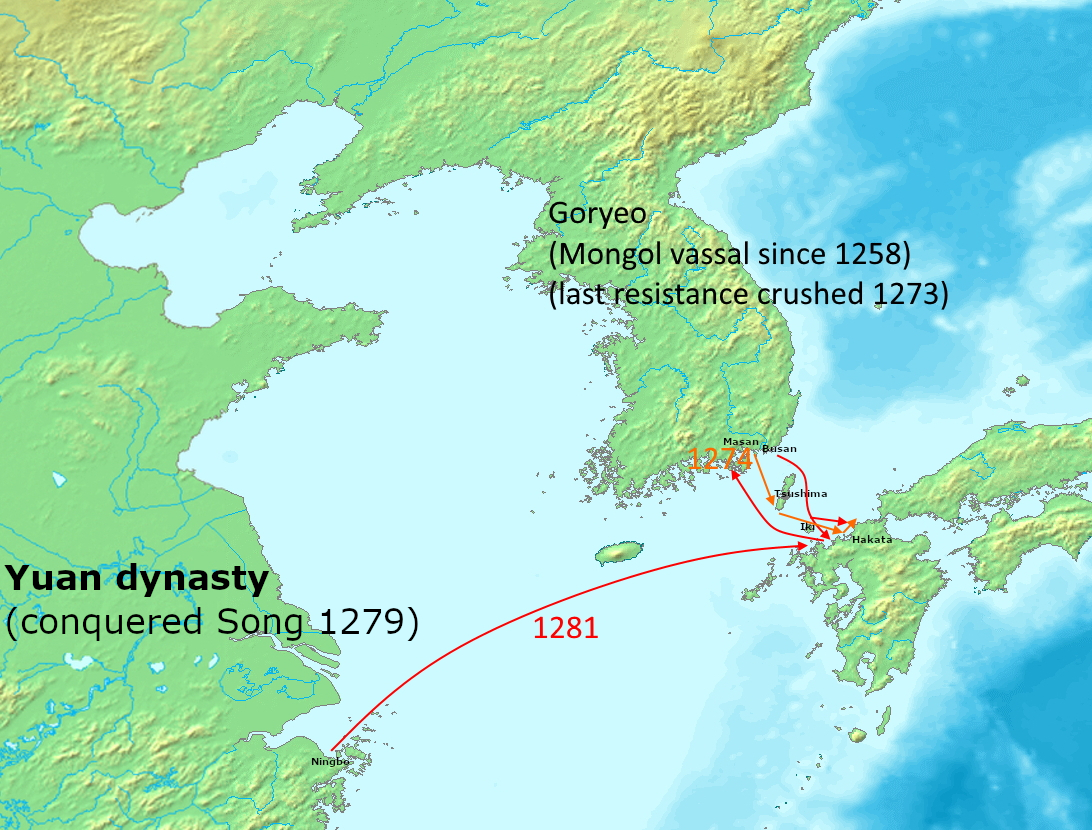
- Mongol invasions of Japan in 1274 and 1281
Date	1274, 1281
Location	Northern Kyūshū, Japan
Result	Japanese victory

Belligerents
Kamakura shogunate; Hōjō clan; Sō clan; Shōni clan; Taira clan; Kikuchi clan; Ōtomo clan; Shimazu clan; Matsura clan; Sashi clan	Yuan dynasty; Goryeo

Commanders and leaders
Emperor Go-Uda; Prince Koreyasu; Hōjō Tokimune; Shōni Kagesuke; Shōni Sukeyoshi; Ōtomo Yoriyasu; Shōni Tsuneyasu; Shōni Kageyasu; Kikuchi Takefusa; Takezaki Suenaga; Shiroishi Michiyasu; Fukuda Kaneshige; Togō Korechika; Hida Nagamoto; Mitsui Sukenaga; Mitsui Yasunaga; Sō Sukekuni; Taira no Kagetaka; Sashi Fusashi; Sashi Nao; Sashi Tōdō; Sashi Isamu; Ishiji Kane; Ishiji Jirō; Yamashiro Kai	Yuan dynasty: Kublai Khan; Indü; Liu Fuheng; Hong Dagu; Wang Ong; Araqan; Atagai; Fan Wenhu; Li Ting; Goryeo dynasty: King Wonjong; King Chungnyeol; Kim Bang-gyŏng

Strength
1274: 4,000–6,000; 1281: 40,000 (?); Reinforcements by Rokuhara Tandai: 60,000 (never arrived)	1274: 28,000–30,000 with 900 ships; 1281: 140,000 with 3,500 ships

Casualties and losses
Unknown	1274: 13,500; 1281: 120,000+

Major military efforts were taken by Kublai Khan of the Yuan dynasty in 1274 and 1281 to conquer the Japanese archipelago after the submission of the Korean kingdom of Goryeo to vassaldom. Ultimately a failure, the invasion attempts are of macro-historical importance because they set a limit on Mongol expansion and rank as nation-defining events in the history of Japan. The invasions are referred to in many works of fiction and gave rise to the belief of kamikaze (神風 "divine wind"), first used to describe the typhoons that destroyed the Mongol invasion fleets in the 13th century. The term was later adopted in the 20th century to describe Japanese pilots who deliberately crashed their aircraft into enemy warships during the last years of World War II.

The invasions were one of the earliest cases of gunpowder warfare outside of China. One of the most notable technological innovations during the war was the use of explosive, hand-thrown bombs.

== Background ==
After a series of Mongol invasions of Korea between 1231 and 1281, Goryeo signed a treaty favouring the Mongols and became a vassal state. Kublai was declared Khagan of the Mongol Empire in 1260, although it was not widely recognized by the Mongols in the west, and established his capital at Khanbaliq (now in Beijing) in 1264.

Japan was then ruled by the Shikken (shogunate regents) of the Hōjō clan, who had intermarried with and wrested control from Minamoto no Yoriie, shōgun of the Kamakura shogunate, after his death in 1203. The inner circle of the Hōjō clan had become so pre-eminent that they no longer consulted the council of the shogunate (Hyōjō (評定)), the Imperial Court of Kyoto, or their gokenin vassals, and they made their decisions at private meetings in their residences (yoriai (寄合)).

The Mongols also made attempts to subjugate the native peoples of Sakhalin, the Ainu and Nivkh peoples, from 1264 to 1308. However, it is doubtful if Mongol activities in Sakhalin were part of the effort to invade Japan.

== Contact ==
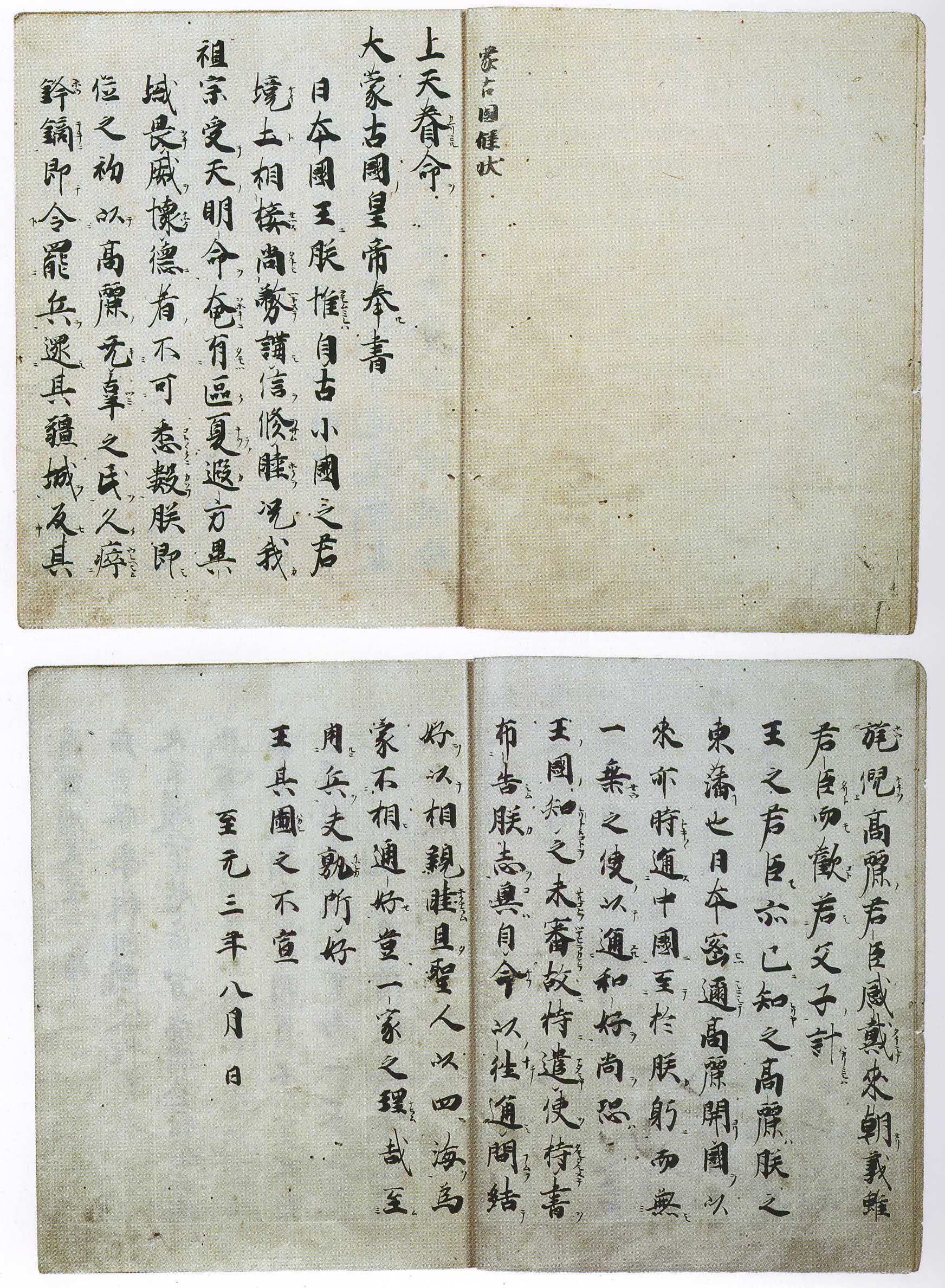
Letter from Kublai Khan of the "Great Mongol State" (大蒙古國) to the "King of Japan" (日本國王), written in Classical Chinese, the lingua franca in East Asia at the time, dated 8th Month, 1266. Now stored in Tōdai-ji, Nara, Japan.

Between 1266 and 1273, Mongol and Korean diplomatic missions went to Japan on six occasions to demand submission to the Mongols, but the Japanese ignored their demands.

In 1265, a well-traveled Goryeo citizen told Kublai that the Mongols should bring Japan to vassalage. Kublai agreed and named Heuk Chŭk and Eun Hong as envoys to Japan. They were ordered to go to Goryeo and request that the king appoint an additional envoy to join them. They delivered this message to Wonjong and two of his officials, Son Gunbi and Kim Chan, were appointed to join them on their journey. On their departure, they were met by a storm, and the Mongol envoys were forced to return home. Kublai was unsatisfied with the outcome and sent Heuk Chŭk back ordering Wonjong to forward the Mongol envoys to Japan.

Yi Changyong, a senior Goryeo minister, attempted to dissuade the Mongols from their plans on Japan. Kublai sent a general, Uya Sondal, to demand that Yi Changyong and Kim Chun, head of the Goryeo military regime, the two most influential officials of Goryeo, be brought to the Yuan court. Instead, Kim had Sondal put to death. This frightened Wonjong, who didn't want to offend the Mongols, but he dared not lay a hand on Kim. Having gone unpunished, Kim and his family began to disrespect the king. Wonjong and Im Yŏn, an official who hated Kim, summoned him to court and killed him.

The Mongol and Goryeo envoys ultimately reached Japan but were treated with incredible disrespect. They were not permitted to enter the capital city, and the Japanese refused to give them lodgings worthy of foreign dignitaries. Instead, they were forced to stay at an inn called Tajabu outside the west gate of the city. They remained there for five months with poor entertainment and bad accommodations before being dismissed without receiving an answer. Kublai could not believe that his envoys had been treated with such disrespect and suspected that this was a ruse by Wonjong, so he sent Heuk Chŭk back to Japan, this time accompanied by the Goryeo envoy, Sim Sa-jŭn. The envoys had not returned by 1268 but ultimately left after their letter was rejected by the Japanese.

The letter stated:

The Emperor of the Great Mongols, being commissioned by Heaven, hereby respectfully presents a letter to the King of Japan. From time immemorial rulers of small states, the borders of which closely adjoin, have always endeavoured to maintain friendly relations with each other and have manifested mutual respect and trust. On our part, we, from the time of our forefathers, have received the Mandate of Heaven and have ruled the universe. Innumerable people in far-off lands have learned to fear our power and have longed for our virtuous rule. When we first ascended the throne, the innocent and helpless people of Korea had suffered for long from military struggles. We therefore ordered a cessation of hostilities, restored their land, and returned the captive Koreans, young and old.
In gratitude both ruler and people of Korea now present themselves at our court. Although the legal relation between ourselves and the Koreans is that of sovereign and subjects, yet in feeling we are as father and children. We assume that Your Highness and your subjects have known this. Korea is our eastern tributary state. Japan is located near to Korea and since her founding has time and again established relations with the Middle Kingdom. However, since our accession you have not yet sent an envoy to our court; nor have you indicated a desire to establish friendly relations with us. We are afraid this is because Your Kingdom has not yet been well informed of this. Therefore we now send a special envoy bearing our state papers to inform you of our desire. We hope that henceforth you will enter into friendly relations with us, and that both our people and yours will enjoy peace and harmony. Moreover, the sages consider the entire universe one family. Therefore, if we should not establish friendly relations with each other, how could it be in accordance with the doctrine of one family? Who would care to appeal to arms?
I hereby leave the matter to Your Highness's careful consideration. (Note: Original text in Chinese: 上天眷命大蒙古國皇帝奉書日本國王朕惟自古小國之君境土相接尚務講信修睦況我祖宗受天明命奄有區夏遐方異域畏威懷德者不可悉數朕即位之初以高麗無辜之民久瘁鋒鏑即令罷兵還其疆域反其旄倪高麗君臣感戴來朝義雖君臣歡若父子計王之君臣亦已知之高麗朕之東藩也日本密邇高麗開國以來亦時通中國至於朕躬而無一乘之使以通和好尚恐王國知之未審故特遣使持書布告朕志冀自今以往通問結好以相親睦且聖人以四海為家不相通好豈一家之理哉以至用兵夫孰所好王其圖之不宣至元三年八月日)

In early 1269, another mission of 70 Koreans and Mongols arrived on Tsushima Island, demanding an answer from Japan to the khagan's letter. The imperial court wanted to respond, but the Kamakura shogunate overruled them. A defiant response to the khagan's demands was drafted but ultimately not delivered.

In late 1270, a final mission was dispatched by Kublai to Japan. The mission was led by the Yuan official Zhao Liangbi and comprised 24 scribes. By now, the Japanese were tired of Mongol entreaties. Upon their arrival in early 1271, the delegation was confronted by armed samurai and placed under arrest. Zhao was freed, but he was denied an audience with the "king of Japan". After delivering their letter and receiving no reply, they went home. Zhao waited for a response until 1273 before returning to China. Irritated and angry, he composed a report for Kublai denigrating the Japanese as mannerless barbarians and urged him not to waste the empire's resources conquering them.

Japanese authorities took seriously the letter brought by the second diplomatic mission to Japan in 1268 as an omen of invasion; shrines and temples were instructed to pray for the repulsion of foreign troops and the central government suspended most of its regular duties to focus on building up defenses around Kyushu.

== First invasion preparations ==
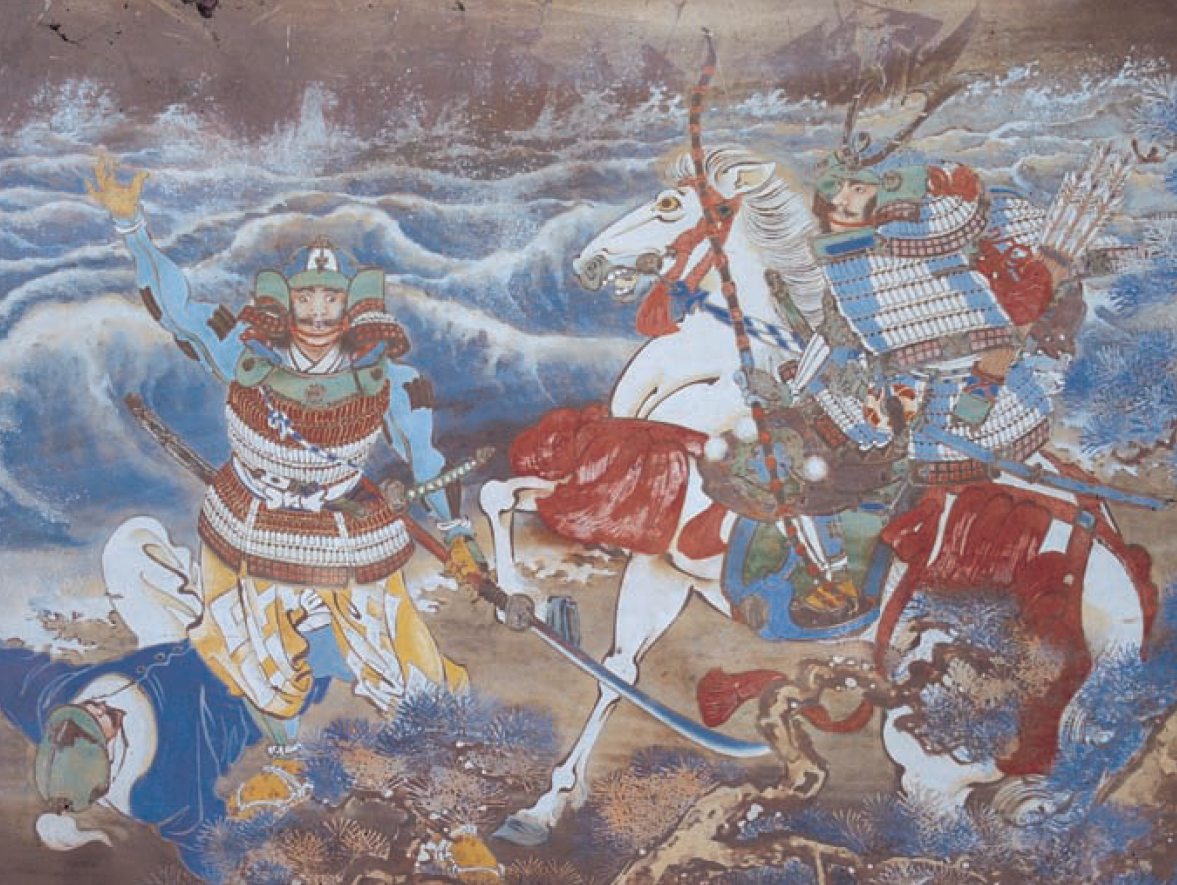
Two Samurai with a dead Mongol at their feet. The one on the right is possibly Sō Sukekuni, the defending commander at Tsushima. Votive image (ema) at the Komodahama Shrine at Sasuura on Tsushima.

In April 1274, the Yuan instructed Indü and Hong Dagu to mobilize 15,000 men for the invasion of Japan. The Korean general Kim Panggyong led a force of 30,500 to build ships in the fashion of the Southern Chinese. A man from Shandong named Qi Gongzhi who helped Kublai design ships was ordered to Korea where he spent a few months before being sent to Xiangyang for the invasion of southern China. Three types of ships were constructed: 300 large thousand dan ships, 300 batulu fast boats, and 300 tenders. Hong Dagu was put in charge of the construction of large transports while Chaqu supervised the construction of the batulu fast boats. Goryeo was responsible for providing the labor, material, and cost of the construction, which they protested. The construction was finished on 5 July 1274. The invasion fleet was scheduled to depart in the seventh lunar month of 1274 but was delayed for three months due to the death of Wonjong on 23 July and Indü and Liu Fuheng's tardiness. They did not arrive until September.

Kublai planned for the fleet to first attack Tsushima Island and Iki Island before making landfall in Hakata Bay. The Japanese plan of defense called on local lords, or gokenin, to assemble their retainers and resist the invasion at every opportunity. Both Yuan and Japanese sources exaggerate the opposing side's numbers, with the History of Yuan putting the Japanese at 102,000, and the Japanese claiming they were outnumbered at least ten to one. In reality, there are no reliable records of the size of Japanese forces, but estimates put their total numbers at around 4,000 to 6,000. The Yuan invasion force was composed of 15,000 Mongol, Han Chinese, and Jurchen soldiers, 6,000 to 8,000 Korean troops, and 7,000 Korean sailors.

A story widely known in Japan is that back in Kamakura, Tokimune was overcome with fear when the invasion finally came and wanting to overcome his cowardice, he asked Mugaku Sogen, his Zen master, also known as Bukkō, for advice. Bukkō replied that he had to sit in meditation to find the source of his cowardice in himself. Tokimune went to Bukkō and said, "Finally there is the greatest happening of my life." Bukkō asked, "How do you plan to face it?" Tokimune screamed, "Katsu!" as if he wanted to scare all the enemies in front of him. Bukkō responded with satisfaction, "It is true that the son of a lion roars as a lion!" Since then, Tokimune was instrumental in spreading Zen and Bushido in Japan among the samurai.

== First invasion (1274) ==
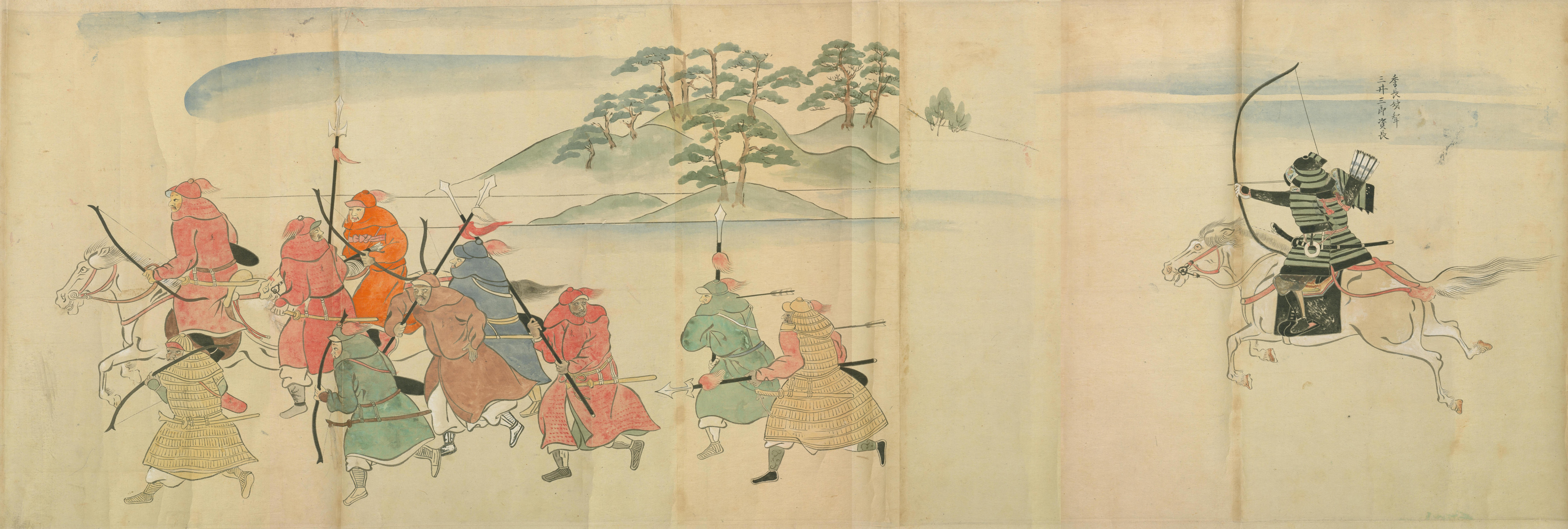
Samurai Mitsui Sukenaga (right) defeating the Mongolian invasion army (left)

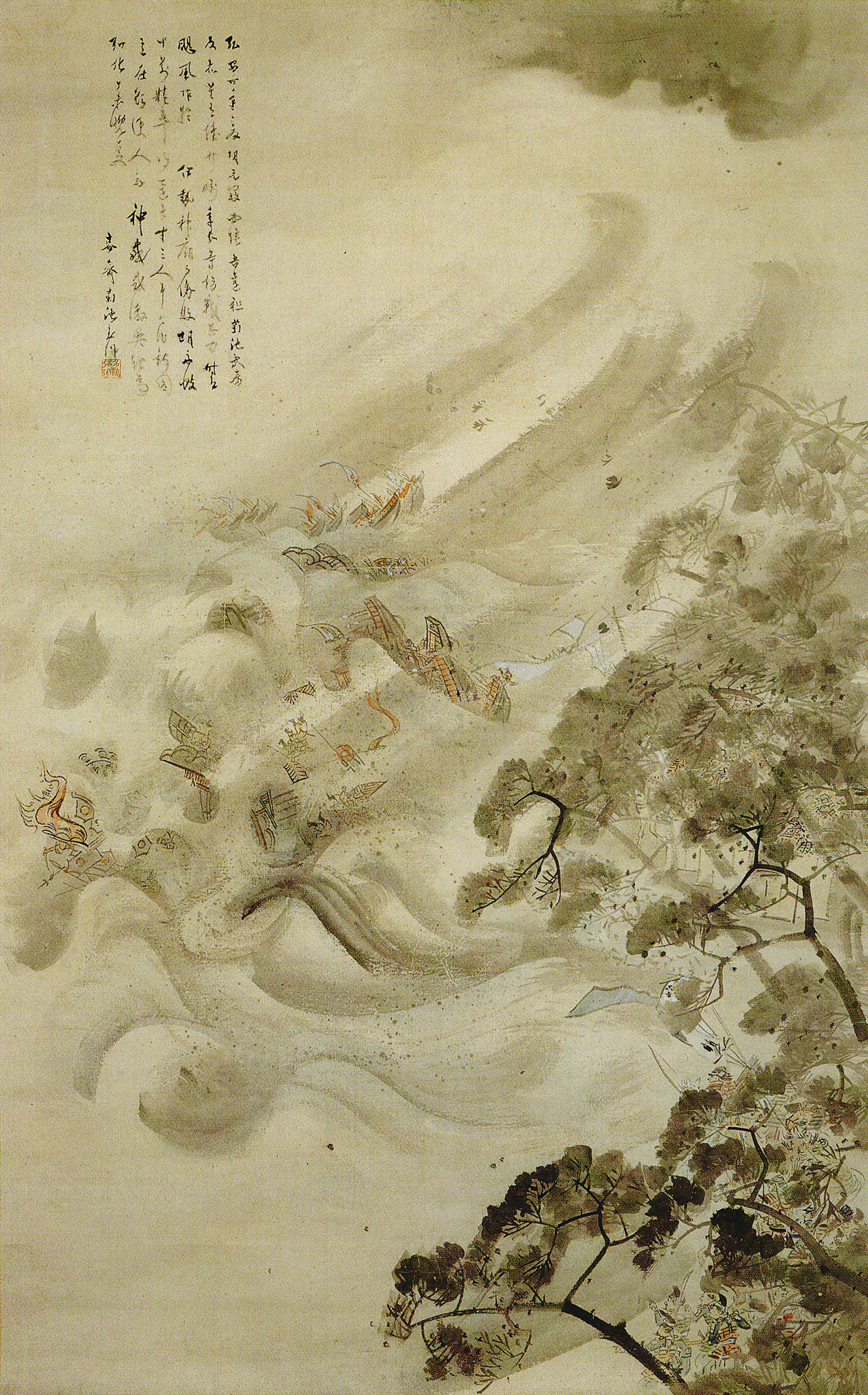
The Mongol fleet destroyed in a typhoon, ink and water on paper, by Kikuchi Yōsai, 1847

=== Invasion of Tsushima ===
The Yuan invasion forces set off from Hoppo (Chinese: 合浦, now Masan, South Gyeongsang Province, Korea) on 2 November 1274 (Dōngyuè 5 in the Chinese calendar). Two days later they began landing on Tsushima Island. The principal landing was made at Komoda beach near Sasuura, on the northwestern tip of what is now the southern island of Shimojima. Additional landings occurred in the bay of Asō, as well as at two points on what is now the northern island of Kamijima.

The main source of the events is based on contemporary Japanese sources, notably the Sō Shi Kafu, a history of the Sō clan of Tsushima.

At Sasuura, the invasion fleet was spotted offshore, allowing the deputy governor (jitodai) Sō Sukekuni time to organize a hasty defense. On that day, the shrine to Hachiman caught fire, which would have been an omen of bad luck, but Sukekuni interpreted it as an omen of warning.

With just 80 mounted samurai and their retinue, Sukekuni confronted an invasion force that the Sō Shi Kafu describes as "8,000 warriors embarked on 900 ships". The Mongols landed at 02:00 in the morning on 4 November, and when Sukekuni sent representatives to attempt to negotiate with them, they were driven off by archers. The fighting began by 04:00. The small garrison force was quickly defeated, but according to the Sō Shi Kafu, one samurai, Sukesada, cut down 25 enemy soldiers in individual combat. The invaders defeated a final Japanese cavalry charge around nightfall; Sukekuni was among those slain.

After their victory at Komoda beach, the Yuan forces burnt down a majority of the buildings around Sasuura and slaughtered most of the inhabitants. They secured their control of Tsushima over the next few days.

=== Invasion of Iki Island ===
The Yuan fleet departed Tsushima on 13 November and attacked Iki Island. Like Sukekuni, Taira no Kagetaka, the governor of Iki, gave a spirited defence with 100 samurai and the local armed populace before falling back to his castle by nightfall. The next morning, Yuan forces had surrounded the castle. Knowing that defeat was inevitable, Kagetaka sent his daughter with a trusted samurai, Sōzaburō, on a secret passage to the shore where a ship was waiting to take them to the mainland. Mongol archers spotted them and fired on the ship; Kagetaka's daughter was killed, but Sōzaburō managed to reach Hakata Bay and report Iki's defeat.

Kagetaka made a final failed sortie with 36 men, 30 of whom died in battle, before committing suicide with his family. According to the Japanese, the Mongols held down the surviving women and stabbed them through their palms with knives, stripped them naked, and tied their corpses to the sides of their ships to demonstrate to other Japanese what their fate would be if they did not surrender.

=== Landing in Hakata Bay ===
The Yuan fleet crossed the sea and landed in Hakata Bay on 19 November, a short distance from Dazaifu, the ancient administrative capital of Kyushu. The following day brought the Battle of Bun'ei (文永の役), also known as the "First Battle of Hakata Bay".

Conlan argues that the History of Yuan's account of the battle suggests that both the Japanese and Yuan forces were of similar size. Conlan estimates that both armies numbered around 3,000 each (not including the Yuan sailors) during this battle, while Japanese historians estimate 6,000 defenders on the Japanese side. The Japanese forces, being inexperienced with non-Japanese tactics, found the Mongol army perplexing. The Yuan forces disembarked and advanced in a dense body protected by a screen of shields. They wielded their polearms in a tightly packed fashion with no space between them. As they advanced, they also threw paper and iron casing bombs on occasion, frightening the Japanese horses and making them uncontrollable in battle. When the grandson of a Japanese commander shot an arrow to announce the beginning of battle, the Mongols burst out laughing.

The commanding general kept his position on high ground and directed the various detachments as need be with signals from hand-drums. But whenever the (Mongol) soldiers took to flight, they sent iron bomb-shells (tetsuho) flying against us, which made our side dizzy and confused. Our soldiers were frightened out of their wits by the thundering explosions; their eyes were blinded, their ears deafened, so that they could hardly distinguish east from west. According to our manner of fighting, we must first call out by name someone from the enemy ranks, and then attack in single combat. But they (the Mongols) took no notice at all of such conventions; they rushed forward all together in a mass, grappling with any individuals they could catch and killing them.

— Hachiman Gudōkun

The History of Yuan gives a similar but shorter account:

Occupying the heights, his generals gave command by beating drums and the troops advanced or retreated according to the beat of the drums. When the enemy had moved into the pre-arranged positions, the invaders attacked from all sides. They also used firearms and [thus] slaughtered the enemy forces in countless numbers. Thus the Japanese were put to rout.

— History of Yuan

The battle lasted for only a day, and the fighting, though fierce, was uncoordinated and brief. One low-ranking samurai, Takezaki Suenaga, received word from his commander Shōni Kagesuke that he was to wait until the Mongols advanced due to difficult terrain, but Takezaki attacked the Mongols anyway. On his way to the beach, he encountered Kikuchi Takefusa, who had already encountered a Yuan detachment, driven them away and killed two. Kikuchi told him the "pirates" had already fled. Takezaki and his five companions charged the small Yuan detachment that Kikuchi had previously encountered, but their horses got stuck in the mud, and they were wounded by a barrage of arrows. Takezaki and three surviving retainers managed to retreat with the aid of Shiroishi Michiyasu, who charged the Yuan detachment and drove them away. By nightfall the Yuan invasion force had forced the Japanese off the beach with a third of the defending forces dead, driving them several kilometres inland, and burning Hakata.

The Japanese were preparing to make a last stand at Mizuki (water castle), an earthwork moat fort dating back to 664. However the Yuan attack never came. One of the three commanding Yuan generals, Liu Fuxiang (Yu-Puk Hyong), was shot in the face by the retreating samurai Shōni Kagesuke and seriously injured. Liu convened with the other generals Indü and Hong Dagu back on his ship. Indü wanted to keep advancing through the night before more Japanese reinforcements arrived, but Hong was worried that their troops were too exhausted and needed rest. There was also fear of being ambushed in the night. Liu agreed with Hong and recalled the Yuan forces back to their ships.

=== Disappearance of the invaders ===
By morning, most of the Yuan ships had disappeared. According to a courtier in his diary entry for 6 November 1274, a sudden reverse wind from the east blew back the Yuan fleet. A few ships were beached, and some 50 soldiers and sailors were captured and executed. According to the History of Yuan, "a great storm arose and many warships were dashed on the rocks and destroyed." It is not certain whether the storm occurred at Hakata Bay or if the fleet had already set sail for Korea and encountered it on their way back. Some accounts report that 200 ships were lost. Of the 30,000-strong invasion force, 13,500 did not return.

== Second invasion preparations ==
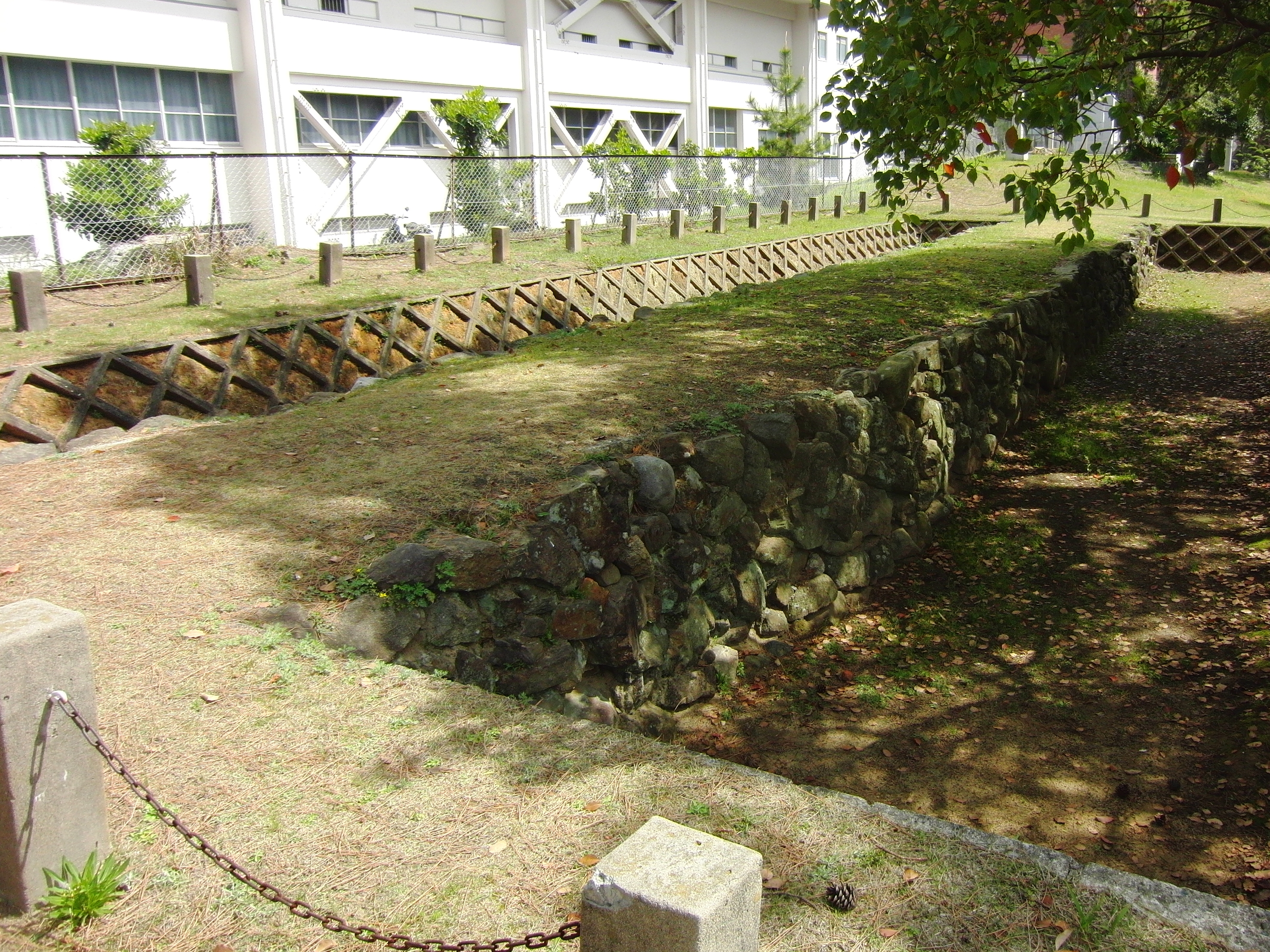
A stone defense wall (Genkō Bōrui) at Nishijin, near Seinan University. Currently, only the top of a few stone walls are exposed to the ground, and most of them have been reclaimed

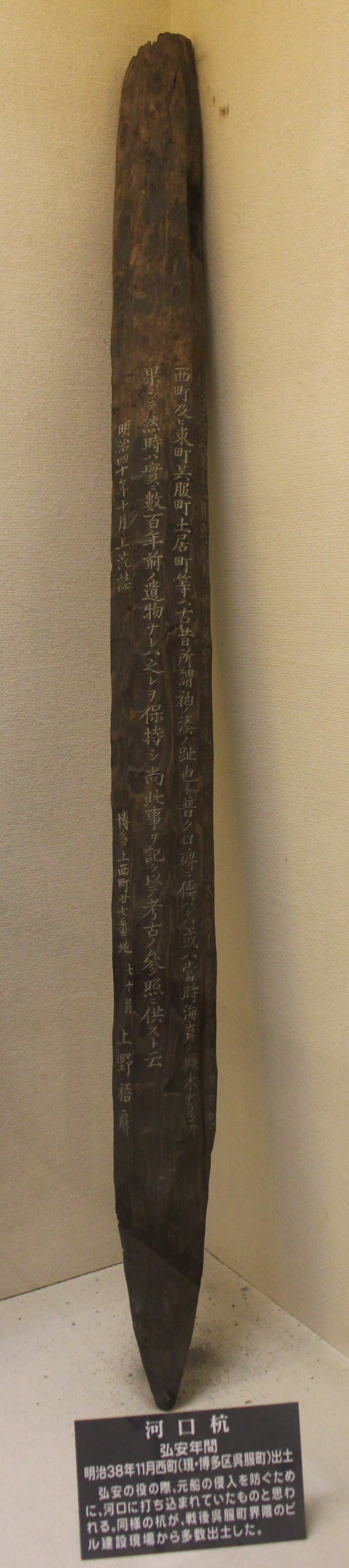
A stake driven into the mouth of a river to prevent the Mongol army from landing. It was excavated in 1905 (Genkō Museum)

After the invasion of 1274, the shogunate made efforts to defend against a second invasion, which they thought was sure to come. They better organized the samurai of Kyūshū and ordered the construction of forts and a large stone wall (石塁, Sekirui or 防塁, Bōrui) and other defensive structures at many potential landing points, including Hakata Bay, where a two-meter (6.6 ft) high wall was constructed in 1276. In addition, a large number of stakes were driven into the mouth of the river and the expected landing sites to prevent the Mongol army from landing.

Kublai Khan sent five Yuan emissaries in September 1275 to Kyūshū, who refused to leave without a reply. Tokimune responded by having them sent to Kamakura and then beheading them. The graves of those five executed Yuan emissaries still exist at Jōryū-ji, in Fujisawa, Kanagawa, near the Tatsunokuchi Execution Place in Kamakura. Five more Yuan emissaries were sent on 29 July 1279, in the same manner, and were again beheaded, this time in Hakata.

In the autumn of 1280, Kublai held a conference at his summer palaces to discuss plans for a second invasion of Japan. The major difference between the first and the second invasion was that the Yuan dynasty had finished conquering the Song dynasty in 1279 and was able to launch a two-pronged attack. The invading force was drawn from several sources, including criminals with commuted death sentences and even those mourning the loss of their parents—a serious affair in China. More than 1,500 ships were requisitioned for the invasion: 600 from southern China and 900 from Korea. Reportedly 40,000 troops were amassed in Korea and 100,000 in southern China. Those numbers are likely an exaggeration, but the addition of southern Chinese resources probably meant the second invasion force was still several times larger than the first invasion. Nothing is known about the size of the Japanese forces.

== Second invasion (1281) ==
=== Attacks on Tsushima and Iki ===
Orders for the second invasion came in the first lunar month of 1281. Two fleets were prepared, a force of 900 ships in Korea and 3,500 ships in southern China with a combined force of 142,000 soldiers and sailors. The Mongol general Arakhan was named supreme commander of the operation and was to travel with the Southern Route fleet, which was under the command of Fan Wenhu but was delayed by supply difficulties.

The Eastern Route army set sail first from Korea on 22 May and attacked Tsushima on 9 June and Iki Island on 14 June. According to the History of Yuan, the Japanese commander Shōni Suketoki and Ryūzōji Suetoki led forces against the invasion force. The expeditionary forces discharged their firearms, and the Japanese were routed, with Suketoki killed in the process. More than 300 islanders were killed. The Yuan soldiers sought out the children and killed them as well. However, the History of Yuan merges events in June with the later battle in July, when Shōni Suketoki actually fell in battle.

=== Landings in Nagato and Hakata Bay ===
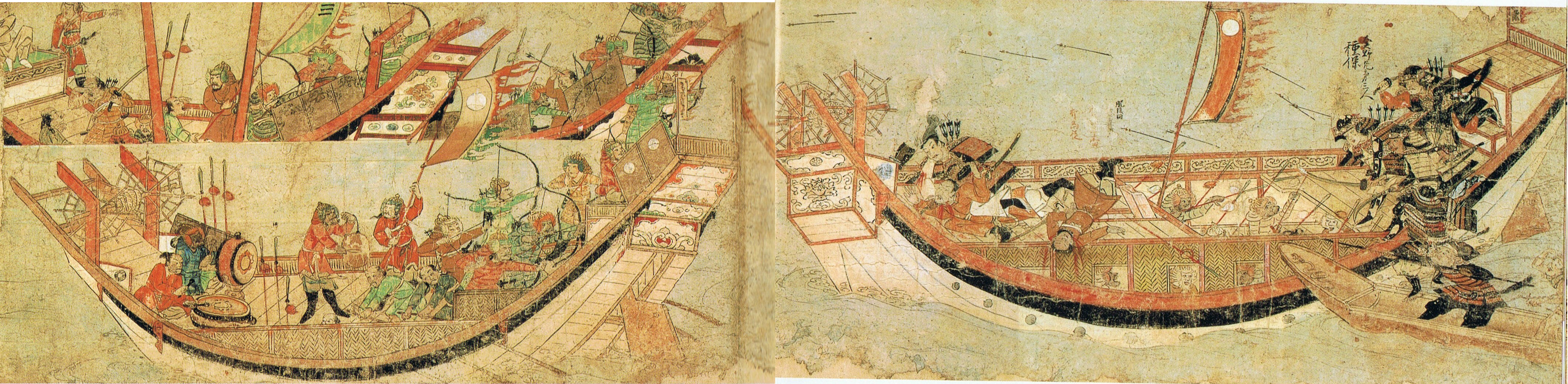
Japanese samurai boarding Yuan ships in 1281

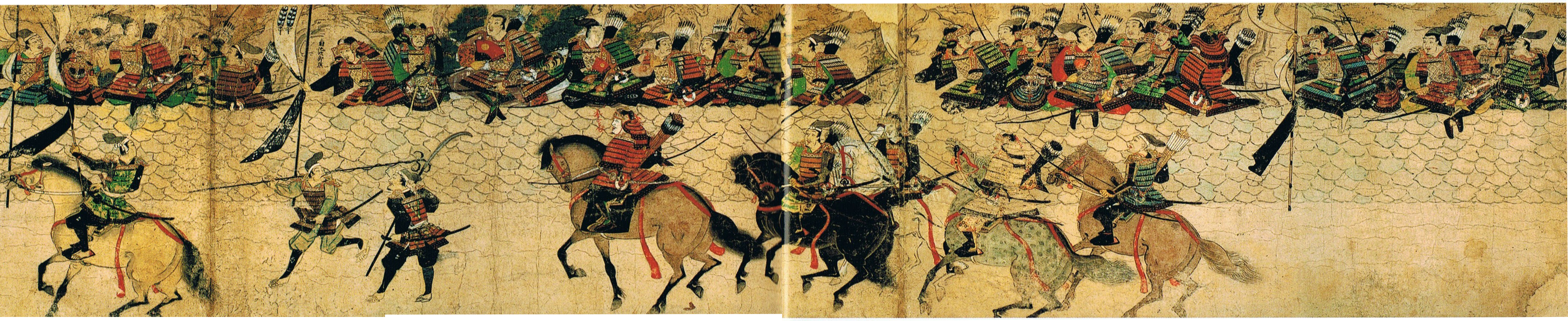
The defensive wall at Hakata

The Eastern Route army was supposed to wait for the Southern Route army at Iki, but their commanders, Hong Dagu and Kim Bang-gyeong, disobeyed orders and set out to invade Mainland Japan by themselves. They departed on 23 June, a full week ahead of the expected arrival of the Southern Route army on 2 July. The Eastern Route army split their forces in half and simultaneously attacked Hakata Bay and Nagato Province. Three hundred ships attacked Nagato on 25 June but were driven off and forced to return to Iki.

Meanwhile, the rest of the Eastern Route army attacked Hakata Bay, which was heavily fortified with a defensive wall. Some Mongol ships came ashore but were unable to make it past the defensive wall and were driven off by volleys of arrows.

=== Japanese counterattacks and Mongol withdrawal ===
Unable to land, the invasion force occupied the islands of Shika and Noko, from which it had planned to launch raids against Hakata. Instead, the Japanese launched raids at night on board small ships. The Hachiman Gudōkun (八幡愚童訓) credits Kusano Jirō with boarding a Mongol ship, setting fire to it, and taking 21 heads.

The next day, Kawano Michiari led a daytime raid with just two boats. His uncle Michitoki was immediately killed by an arrow, and Michiari was wounded both in the shoulder and the left arm. However, upon boarding the enemy ship, he slew a large Mongol warrior, for which he was made a hero and richly rewarded. Takezaki Suenaga was also among those who raided the Yuan fleet. Takezaki also participated in driving the Mongols from Shika, although in that instance, he was wounded and forced them to withdraw to Iki on 30 June.

The Japanese defence of Hakata Bay is known as the Battle of Kōan. On 16 July, fighting commenced between the Japanese and Mongols at Iki Island, resulting in Mongol withdrawal to Hirado Island.

=== Stalemate at Hakata ===
After the Southern Route fleet convened with the Eastern Route fleet, the two fleets took some time rearranging themselves before they advanced on Taka island. After taking Taka island, the Yuan army advanced on Hakata. A two-week battle ensued throughout the countryside that entered a stalemate.

On 12 August, the Japanese repeated their small raids on the invasion fleet that lasted throughout the night. The Mongols responded by fastening their ships together with chains and planks to provide defensive platforms. There are no accounts of the raids from the Japanese side in this incident unlike at the defence of Hakata Bay. According to the History of Yuan, the Japanese ships were small and were all beaten off:

Japanese war craft, being small in size, were no match [for these ships]. Those which came up to attack were all beaten off. The whole country therefore was trembling with fear. In the markets there was no rice for sale. The Japanese ruler went in person to visit the Hachiman Shrine to make supplication. He also had a royal rescript read at the shrine of the Sun Goddess, imploring that the country be saved in exchange for his own life.

— History of Yuan

=== Typhoon kamikaze and the end of the invasion ===
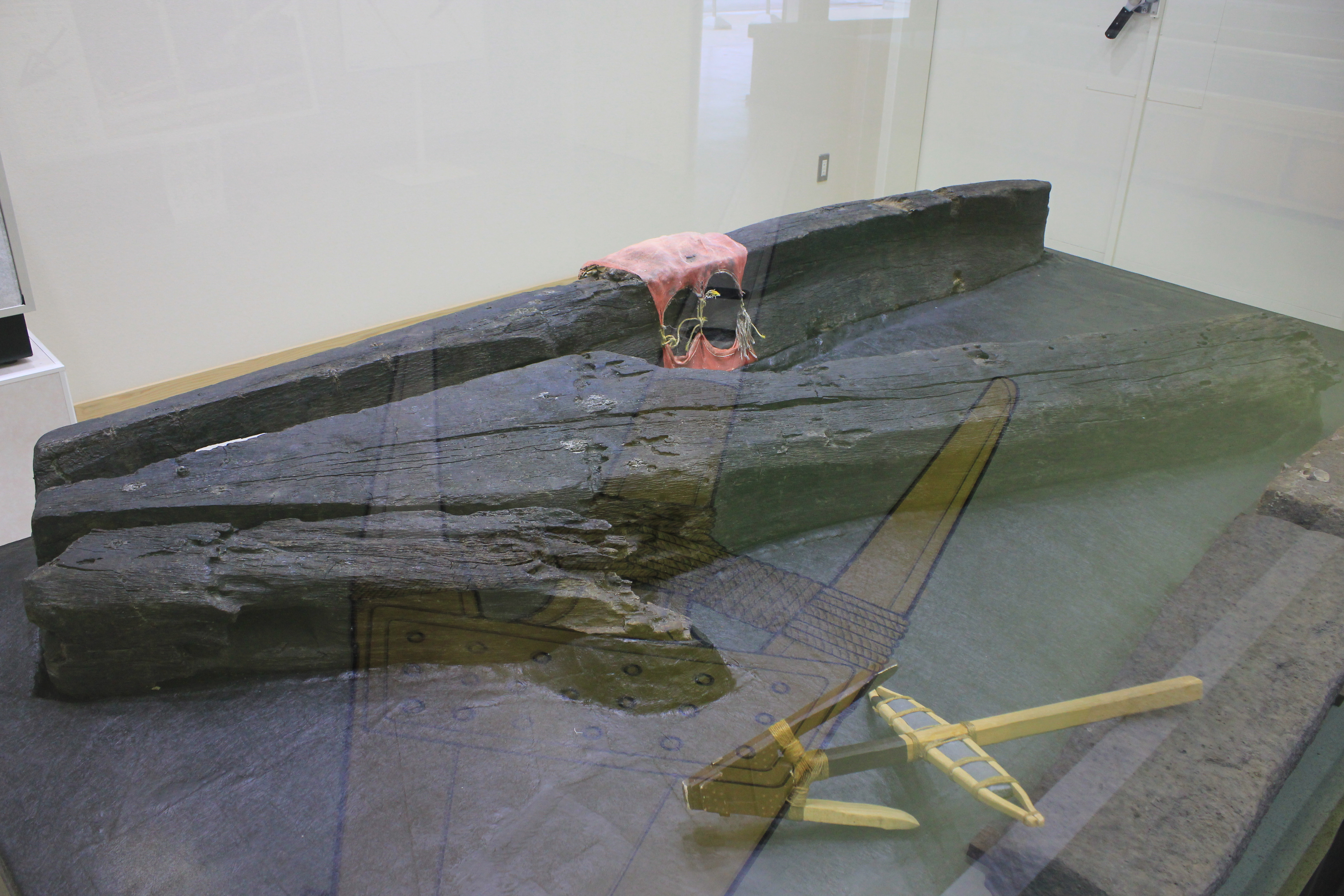
Wooden anchor of Mongol invasion

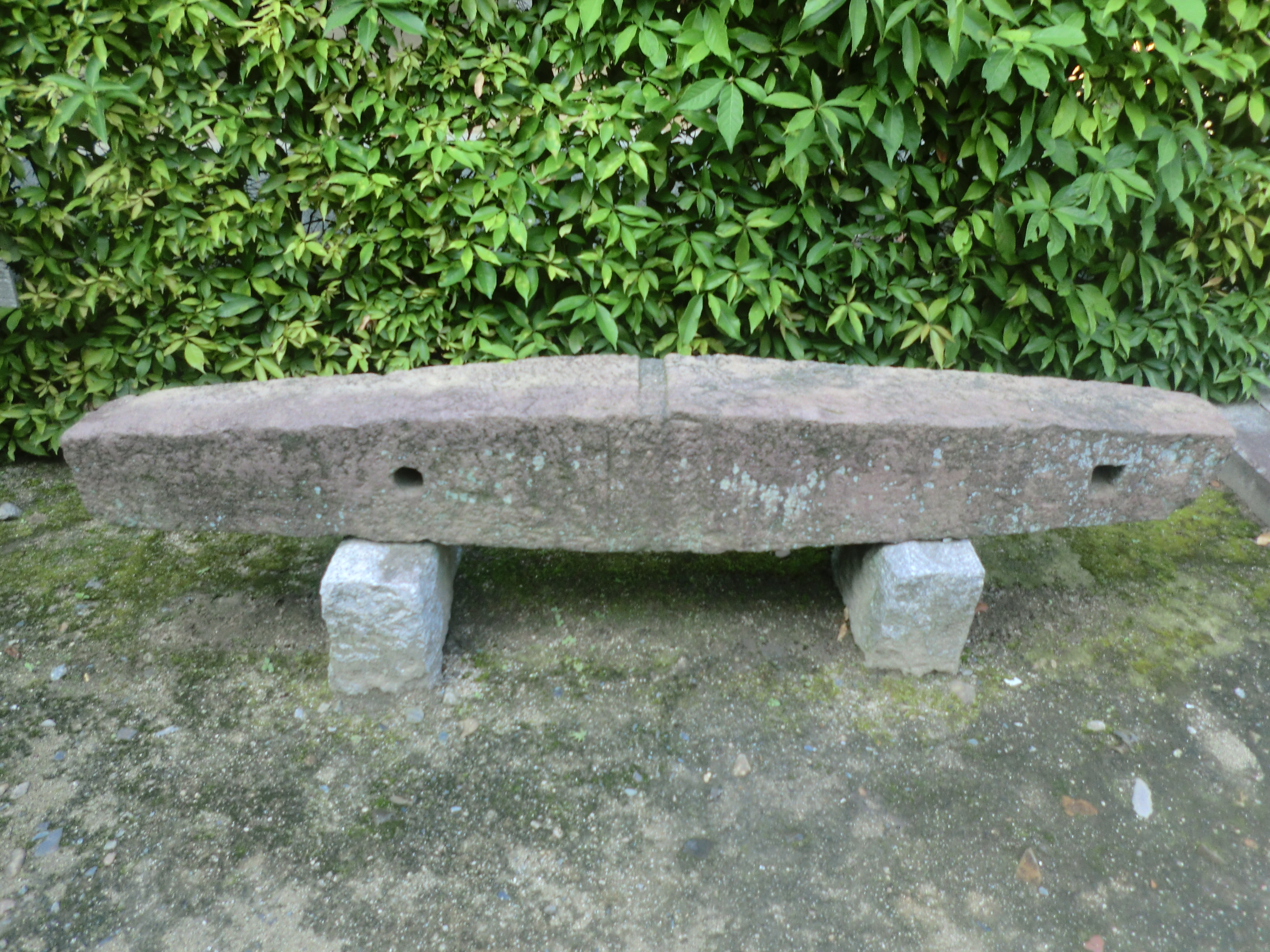
Stone anchor of Mongol invasion

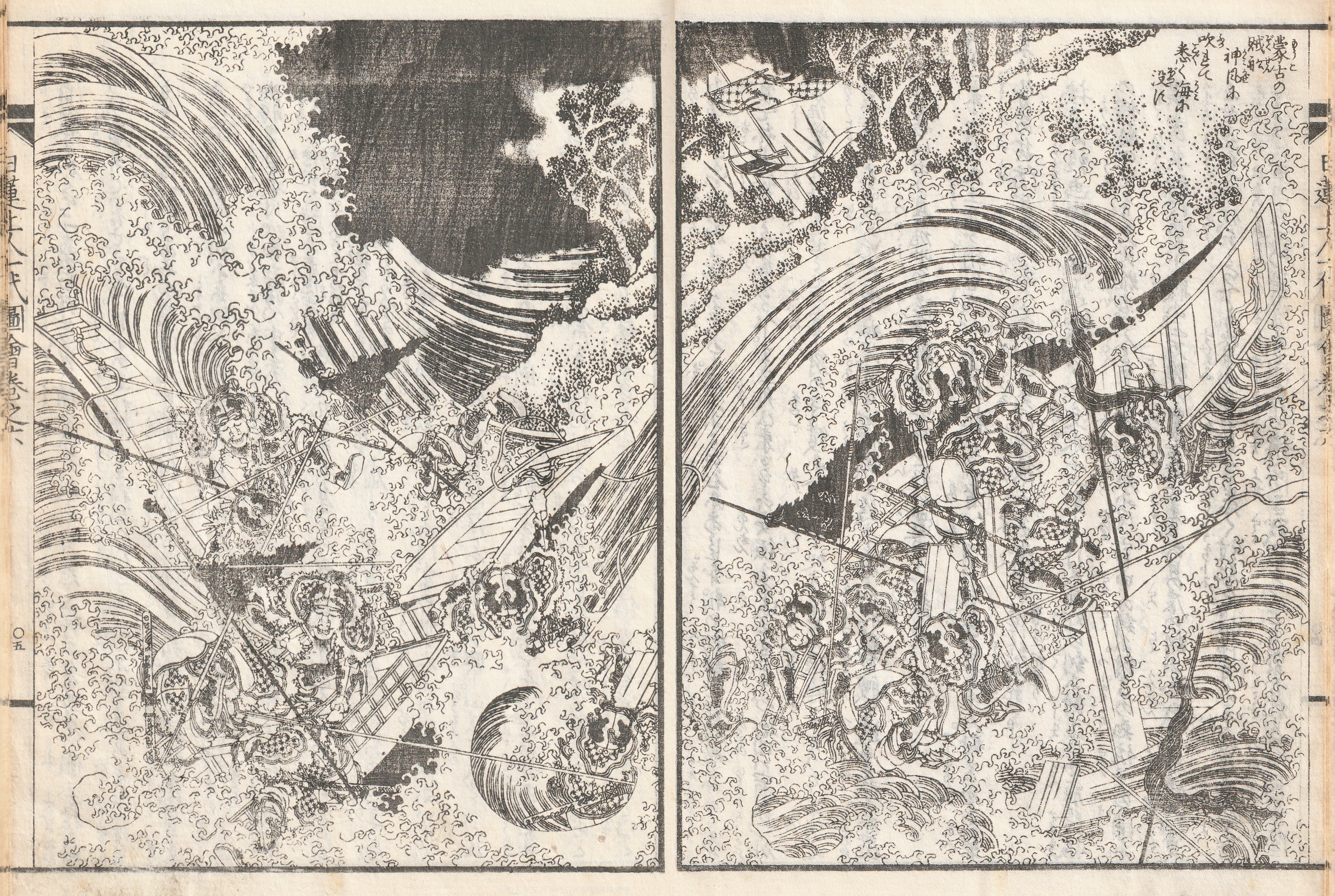
Illustration by Katsushika Isai (1821–1880)

On 15 August, a great typhoon, known in Japanese as kamikaze, struck the fleet at anchor from the west and devastated it. Sensing the oncoming typhoon, Korean and south Chinese mariners retreated and unsuccessfully docked in Imari Bay, where they were destroyed by the storm. Thousands of soldiers were left drifting on pieces of wood or washed ashore. The Japanese defenders killed all those they found except for the southern Chinese, who they felt had been coerced into joining the attack on Japan.

Now it happened one day that such a gale was blowing from the north that the troops declared that, if they did not get away, all their ships would be wrecked. So they all embarked and left the island and put out to sea. And let me tell you that when they had sailed about four miles, the gale began to freshen and there was such a crowd of ships that many of them were smashed by colliding with one another.

— Marco Polo

According to a Chinese survivor, after the typhoon Commander Fan Wenhu picked the best remaining ships and sailed away, leaving more than 100,000 troops to die. After being stranded for three days on Taka island, the Japanese attacked and captured tens of thousands. They were moved to Hakata where the Japanese killed all the Mongols, Koreans, and Northern Chinese. The Southern Chinese were spared but made slaves. According to a Korean source, of the 26,989 Koreans who set out with the Eastern Route fleet, 7,592 did not return. Chinese and Mongol sources indicate a casualty rate of 60 to 90 percent.

=== Size of the invasion ===
Many modern historians believe the figures for the invasion force to be exaggerated, as was common in post-classical chronicles. Thomas Conlan, from Princeton University, writes that they were likely exaggerated by an order of magnitude (140,000), implying that it was 14,000 soldiers and sailors instead, and expresses skepticism that a medieval-era kingdom could have managed an invasion on the scale of D-Day during World War II, across over ten times the distance, and questions if even 10,000 soldiers attacked Japan in 1281.

Morris Rossabi writes that Conlan is correct in his assertion that the invasion force was much smaller than traditionally believed but argues that the expenditures lavished on the mission confirm that the fighting force was sizable and much larger than 10,000 soldiers and 4,000 sailors. He puts forward the alternative figure of 70,000 soldiers and sailors, half of what is stated in the Yuanshi and later Japanese claims.

Turnbull believes that more than 140,000 is an exaggeration but does not offer his own estimate for the size of the army. Rather, he states that given the contributions of the Southern Song, the second invasion should have been around three times larger than the first. As he earlier listed the common figure of 23,000 for the first invasion uncritically—unlike the estimate of more than 140,000 for the second which would imply an invasion force of around 70,000, on par with Rossabbi's estimate.

== Aftermath ==
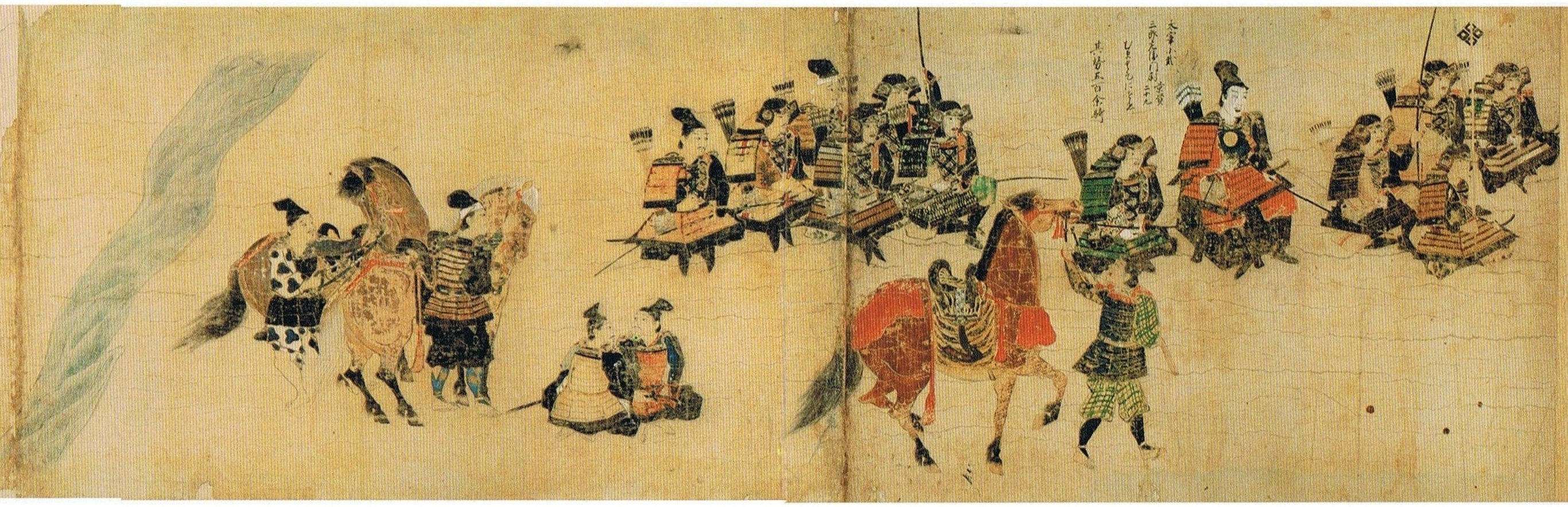
Shōni Kagesuke and his forces in Akasaka

The defeated Mongol Empire lost most of its naval power, and its naval defense capability declined significantly. Korea, which was in charge of shipbuilding for the invasion, also lost its ability to build ships and its ability to defend the sea since a large amount of lumber was cut down. On the other hand, in Japan there was no newly acquired land because it was a defensive war, and so the Kamakura shogunate could not give rewards to gokenin who participated in the battle, and its authority declined. Later, taking advantage of the situation, the number of Japanese joining the wokou began to increase, and attacks on the coasts of China and Korea intensified.

As a result of the war, there was a growing recognition in China that the Japanese were brave and violent and that any invasion of Japan was futile. During the Ming dynasty, an invasion of Japan was discussed three times but never carried out considering the result of this war.

=== Cultural influence ===
The Zen Buddhism of Hōjō Tokimune and his Zen master Bukkō gained credibility beyond national boundaries, and the first mass followings of Zen teachings among samurai began to flourish. The failed invasions also mark the first use of the word kamikaze ("divine wind"). The fact that the typhoon that helped Japan defeat the Mongol navy in the first invasion occurred in late November, well after the normal Pacific typhoon season (May to October), perpetuated the Japanese belief that they would never be defeated or successfully invaded, which remained an important aspect of Japanese foreign policy until the very end of World War II. The failed invasions also demonstrated one of the Mongols' weaknesses: the inability to mount naval invasions successfully.

== Military significance ==
=== Bombs and cannons ===
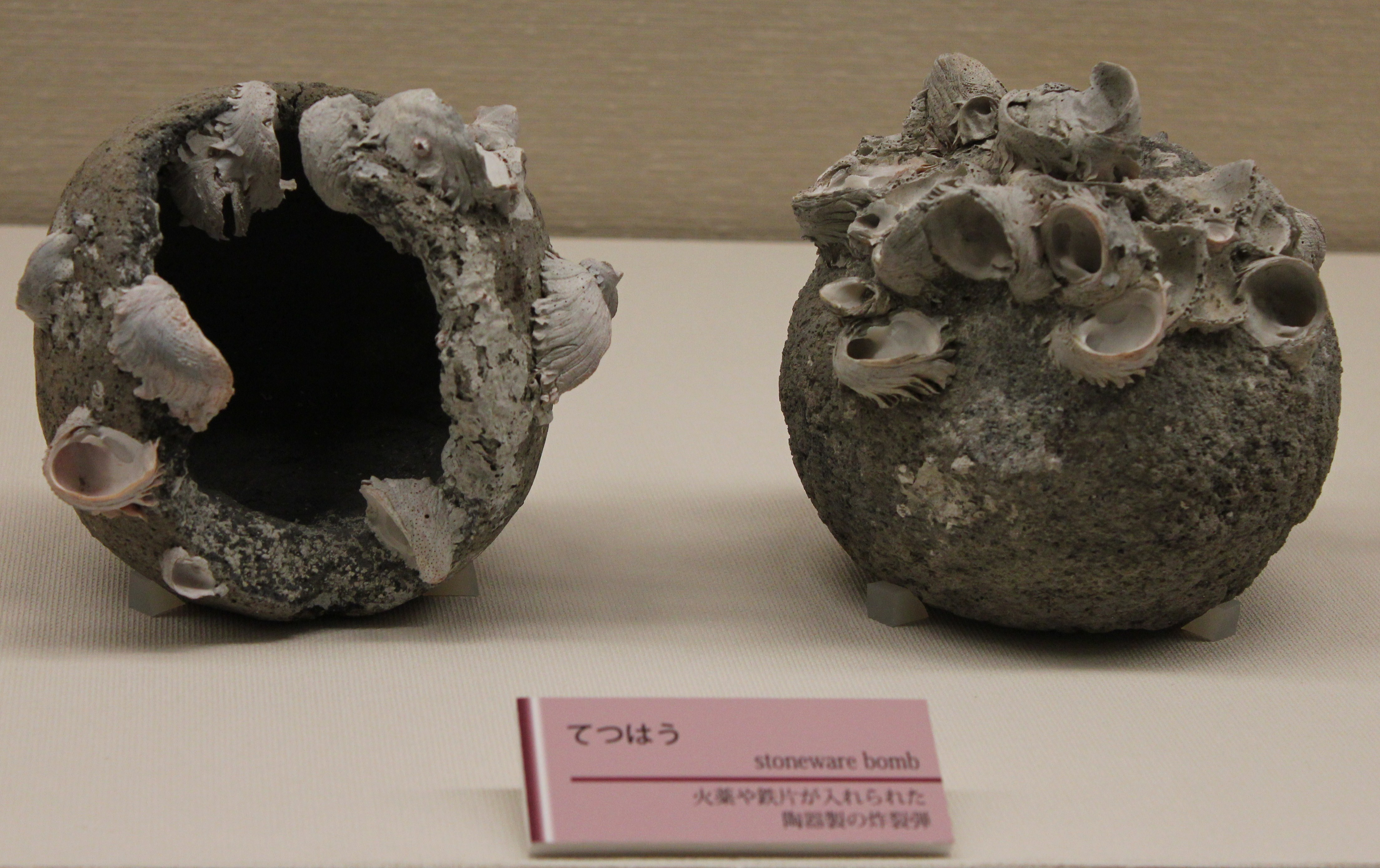
Stoneware bombs, known in Japanese as tetsuhō (iron bomb), or in Chinese as zhentianlei (literally, heaven-shaking thunder), excavated from Takashima shipwreck, October 2011

The Mongol invasions are an early example of gunpowder warfare outside of China. One of the most notable technological innovations during the war was the use of explosive bombs. The bombs are known in Chinese as "thunder crash bombs" and were fired from catapults, inflicting damage on enemy soldiers. An illustration of a bomb is depicted in the Japanese Mongol Invasion scrolls, but Thomas Conlan has shown that the illustration of the projectiles was added to the scrolls in the 18th century and should not be considered to be an eyewitness representation of their use. However, archaeological discoveries since Conlan's statement have confirmed the existence of bombs in the Yuan invasion's arsenal. Multiple bomb shells were discovered in an underwater shipwreck off the shore of Japan by the Kyushu Okinawa Society for Underwater Archaeology. X-rays by Japanese scientists of the excavated shells show that they contained gunpowder and were also packed with scrap iron.

The Yuan forces may have also used cannons during the invasion. The Nihon Kokujokushi, written around 1300, mentions huo tong (fire tubes) at the Battle of Tsushima in 1274 and the second coastal assault led by Indü in 1281. The Hachiman Gudoukun of 1360 mentions iron pao "which caused a flash of light and a loud noise when fired." The Taiheiki mentions a weapon shaped like a bell that made a noise like thunder-clap and shot out thousands of iron balls.

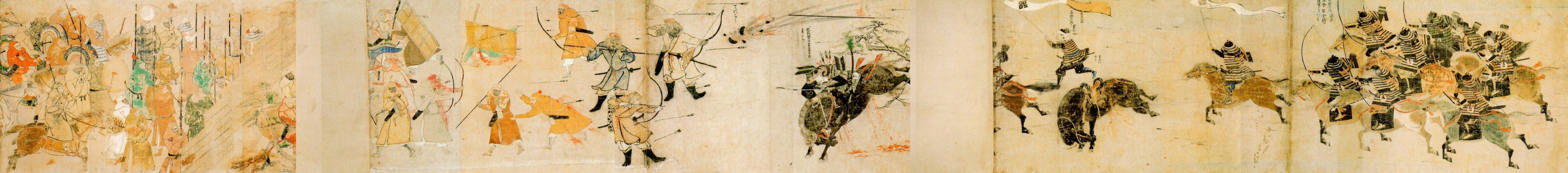
Takezaki Suenaga and escaping Mongolians

=== Japanese sword ===
The yumi (longbow) and naginata were the main weapons of samurai in this period. Yumi is able to shoot while riding on horseback with the Japanese sword acting as a secondary weapon. As a result of the war, intellectuals of the Mongol Empire regarded Japanese swords as a threat. For example, Wang Yun, who served Kublai, and Zheng Si-xiao, a surviving retainer of the Song dynasty, mentioned in their book that "Japanese swords are long and extremely sharp." They argued that the combination of a violent samurai and a Japanese sword was a threat.

The Mongol invasions facilitated a change in the designs of Japanese swords. The swordsmiths of the Sōshū school represented by Masamune studied tachi that were broken or bent in battle, developed new production methods, and created innovative tachi. They forged the blade using a combination of soft and hard steel to optimize the temperature and timing of the heating and cooling of the blade, resulting in a lighter but more robust blade. They made the curve of the blade more gentle, lengthened the tip linearly, widened the width from the cutting edge to the opposite side of the blade, and thinned the cross section to improve the penetration and cutting ability of the blade.

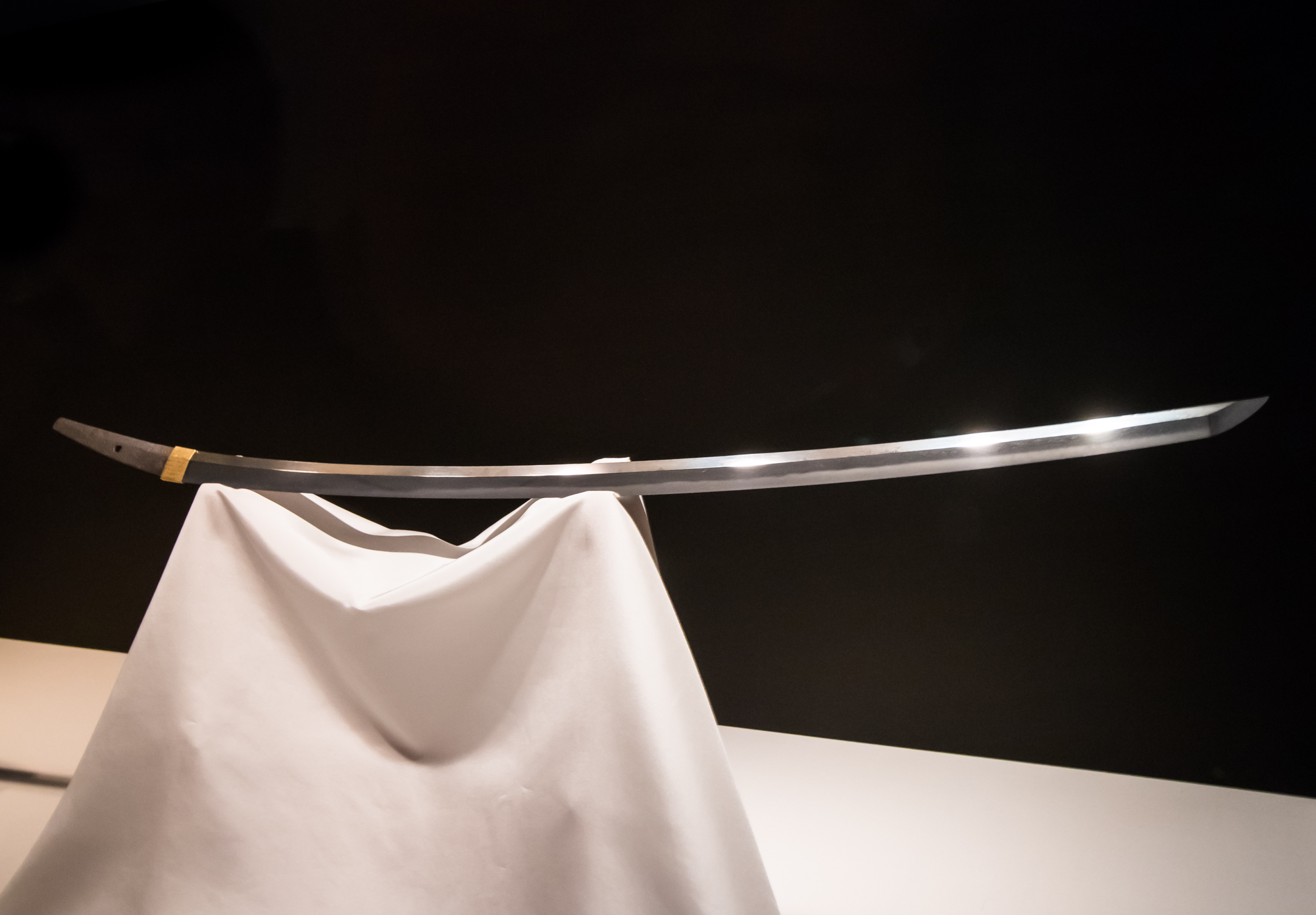
A typical Ko-Hōki (old Hōki) school tachi. Dōjigiri, by Yasutsuna. 12th century, Heian period, National Treasure, Tokyo National Museum. This sword is one of the Five Swords Under Heaven. (天下五剣 Tenka Goken)

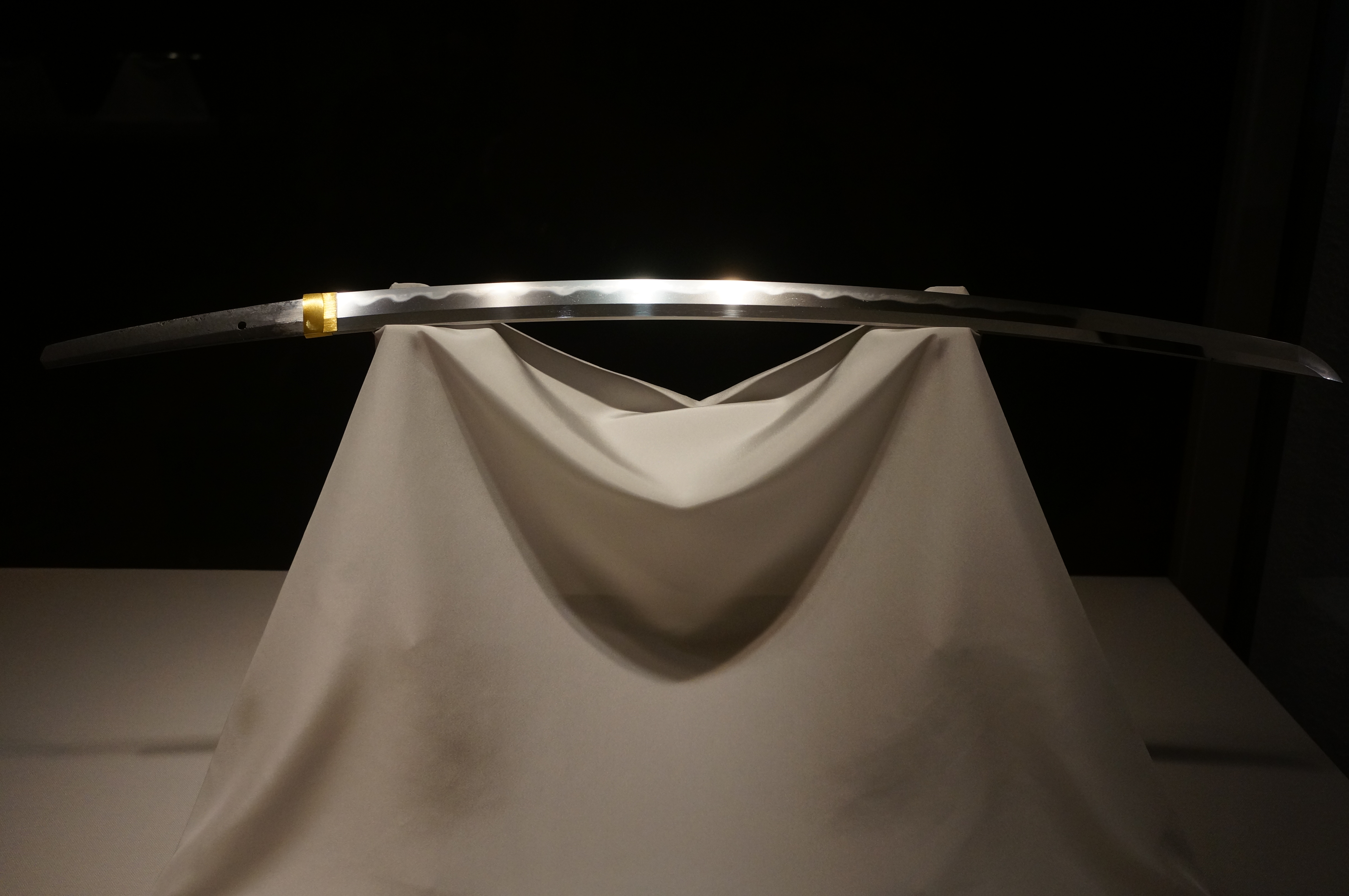
A Sōshū school katana. It was originally a tachi forged by Masamune in the 14th century, but later it was cut from the root and converted into a katana. As it was owned by Ishida Mitsunari, it was commonly called Ishida Masamune. Important Cultural Property, Tokyo National Museum

== Gallery ==
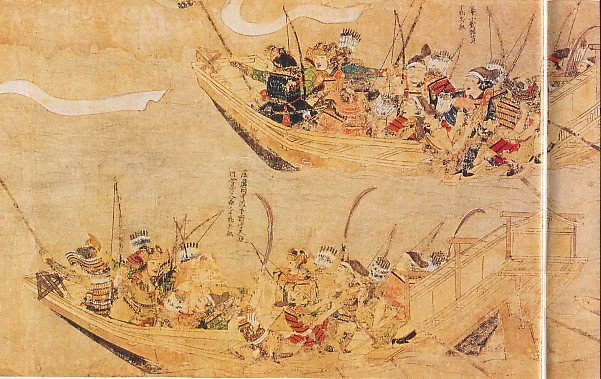
Japanese attack ships

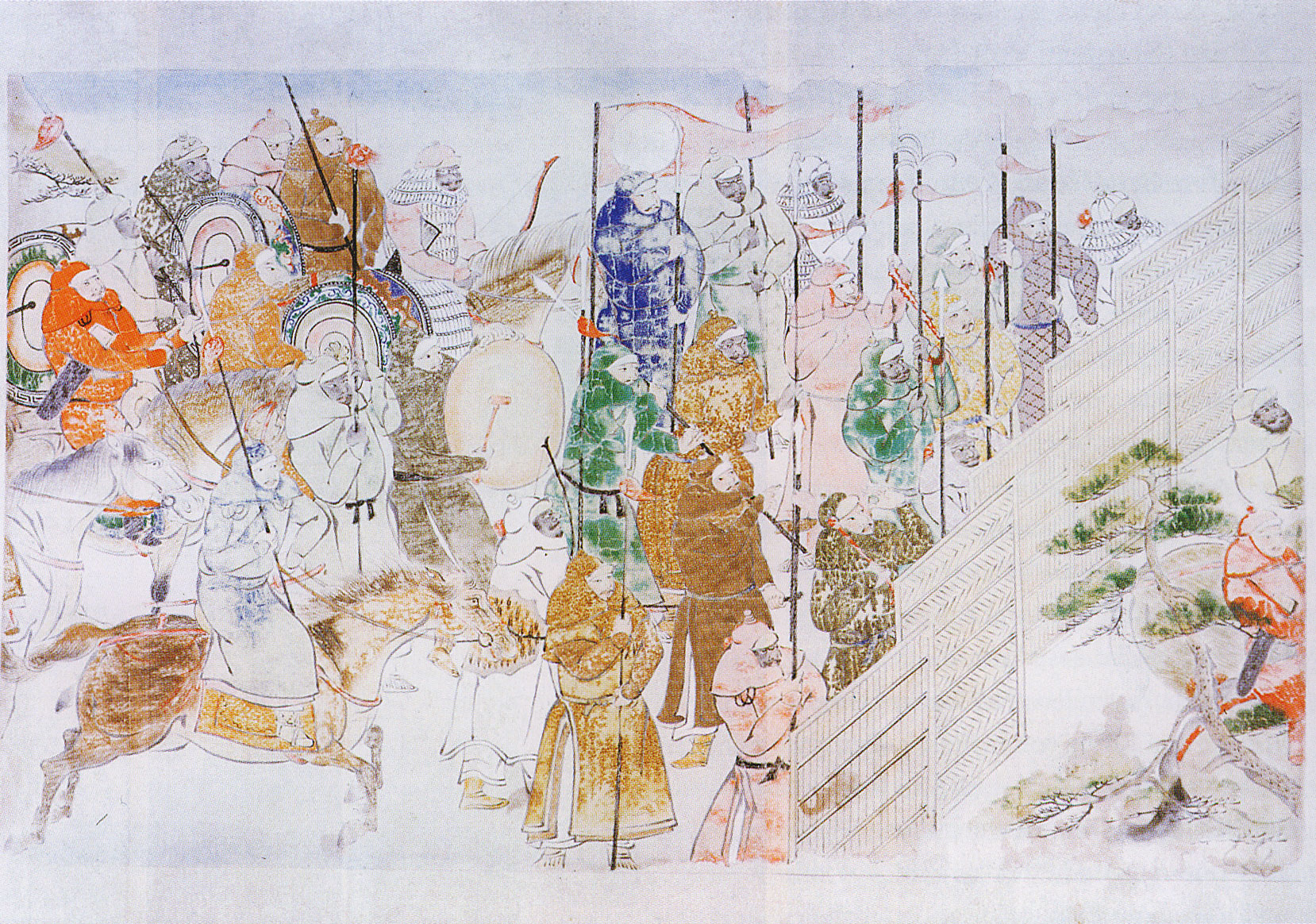
Mongol soldiers, second version

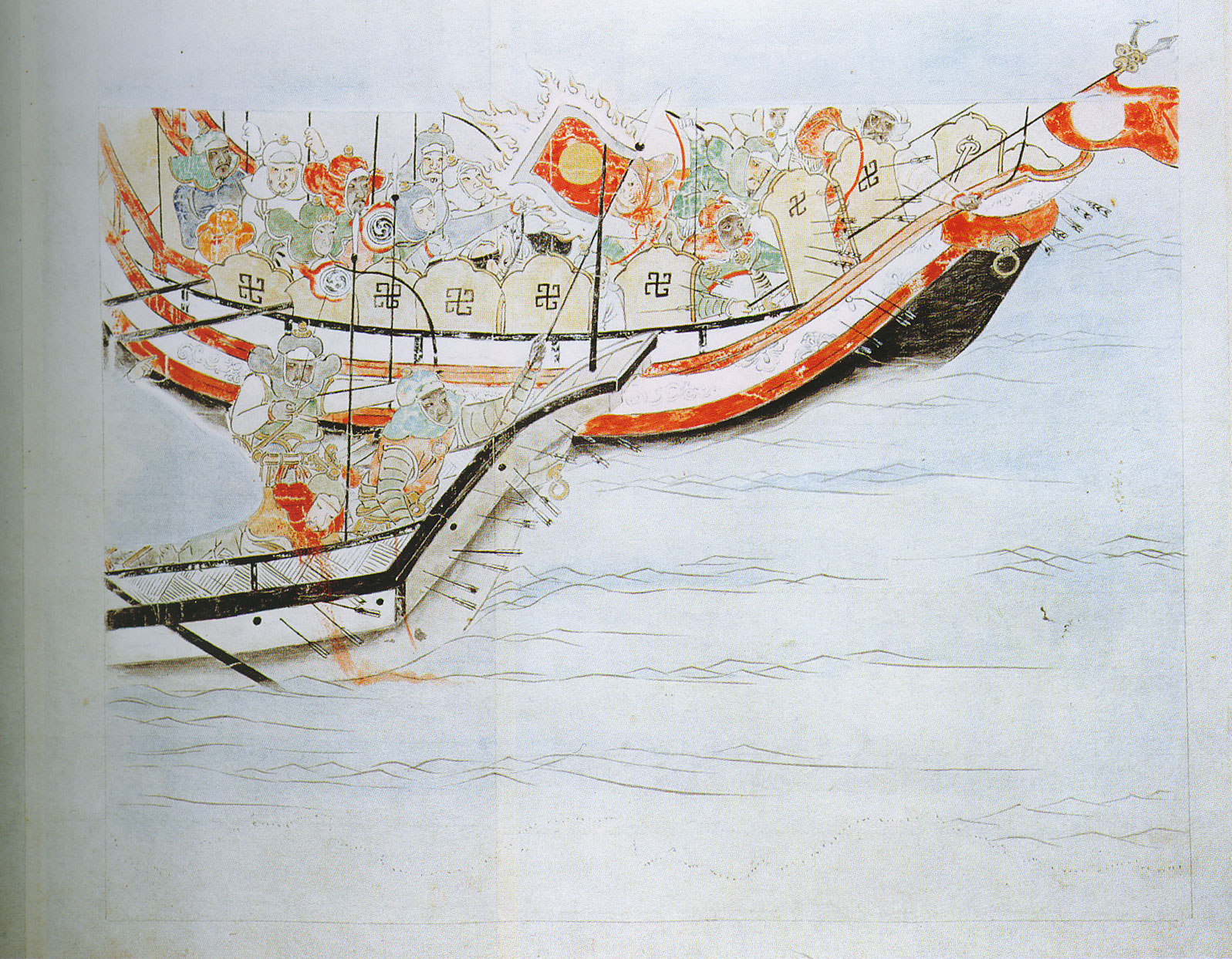
Mongol ships, second version

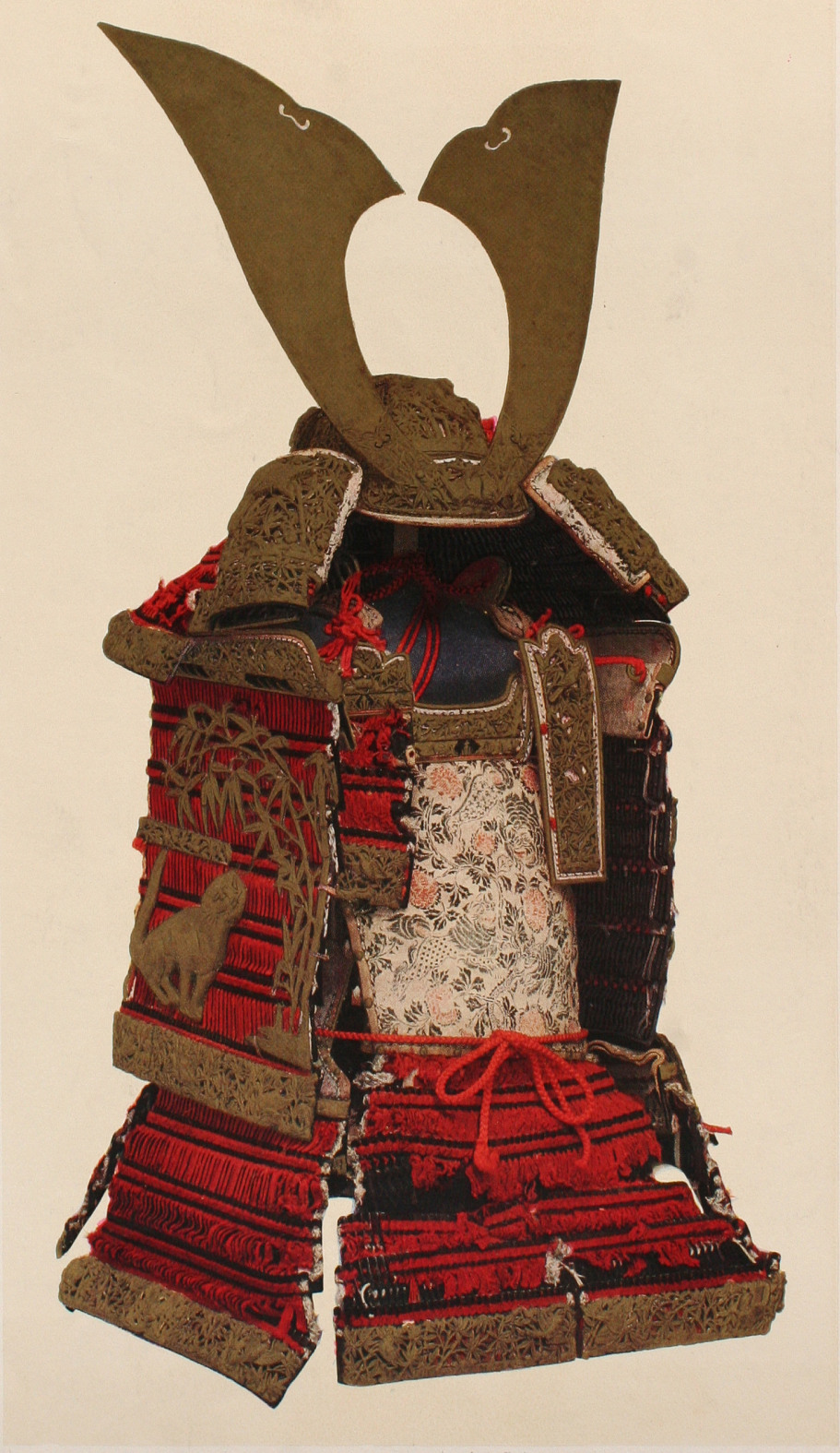
Japanese armour ō-yoroi, National Treasure, Kasuga grand shrine

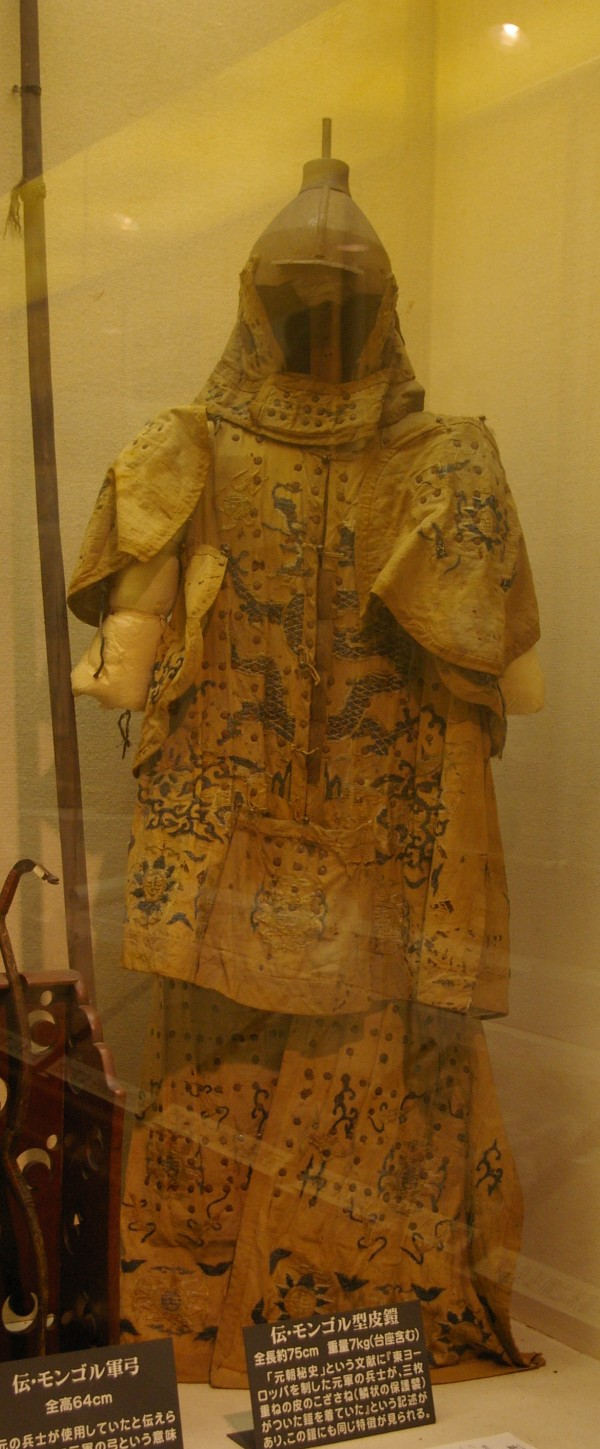
Mongol brigandine armour

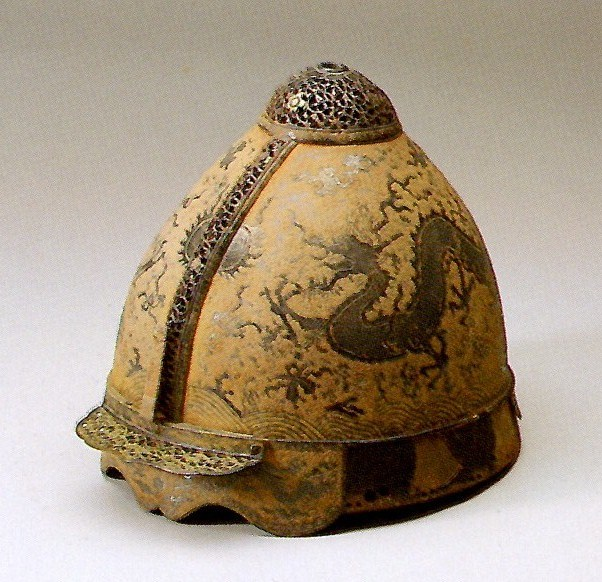
Mongol helmet

Iron plaque depicting a mounted Samurai battling Mongol foot soldiers, made by Komai in a cartouche on the back between 1890 and 1900. Found at Russell-Cotes Art Gallery & Museum in Bournmouth, England.

== See also ==
- Mongol invasion of Java
- Genkō Bōrui
- Goryeo under Mongol rule
- Battles of Khalkin Gol – failed Japanese attempt to invade Mongolia in 1939.
- Mongol invasions of Sakhalin
- Mongolians in Japan
- Battle of Baekgang – battle between Baekje and Yamato Japan, against Silla and Tang China.
- Toi invasion
- Japan–Mongolia relations
