= Fushimi-in no Shinsaishō =

Fushimi-in no Shinsaishō (伏見院新宰相) (fl. 1288–1317) was a Japanese waka poet of the Kamakura period.

== Biography ==
Fushimi-in no Shinsaishō was the daughter of Yamamomo Chikatada (楊梅親忠, real name Fujiwara no Tsunetada 藤原経忠) and sister of Yamamomo Kaneyuki. Her year of birth is unknown.

According to the Nakatsukasa-no-naishi Nikki, she served Emperor Fushimi from his time as crown prince (春宮). According to the Nakatsukasa-no-naishi Nikki and Fushimi-tennō Shinki (伏見天皇宸記), on the 25th day of the twelfth month of Kōan 10 (29 January 1288 in the Julian calendar), after his senso (ja), during the imperial procession to Kitayamadono (北山殿) she and other women of the court such as Minamoto no Shinshi (源親子) took part in an utakai (poetic gathering) to compose poems of praise. According to the Go-Fukakusa-in Shinki (後深草院宸記) included in the Gosokui Burui (御即位部類), on the 15th day of the third month of the following year (17 April 1289) she served at the enthronement ceremony.

Before the establishment of the Kyōgoku School she was already in the service of Emperor Fushimi, and after that school was established she took part in the majority of their uta-awase poetic gatherings, including the Sendō Gojū-ban Uta-awase (仙洞五十番歌合) and the Eifuku Mon'in Uta-awase (永福門院歌合), becoming an influential poet in the Kyōgoku School.

She mourned the death of Emperor Fushimi in Bunpō 1 (1317), with a lament of hers being included in the aishōka book of the Shoku-Senzai Wakashū, but it appears she herself died shortly thereafter. The year of her death is unknown. Thirteen of her poems were included in each of the Gyokuyō Wakashū and Fūga Wakashū, and a total of four of her poems were included in the imperial anthologies Shoku-Senzai Wakashū and Shin-Shūi Wakashū. In his article on her for the Nihon Koten Bungaku Daijiten, Shūichi Fukuda called her poetic style a moderate Kyōgoku style.
