= Mitsui Sukenaga =

Mid-Kamakura period warrior

Mitsui Sukenaga (三井 資長) was a warrior of the mid-Kamakura period. His common name was Saburō. He is believed to have been part of the Mitsui clan, a family serving as shugodai of Nagato Province. His wife was the elder sister of Takezaki Suenaga, known from the Mōko Shūrai Ekotoba.

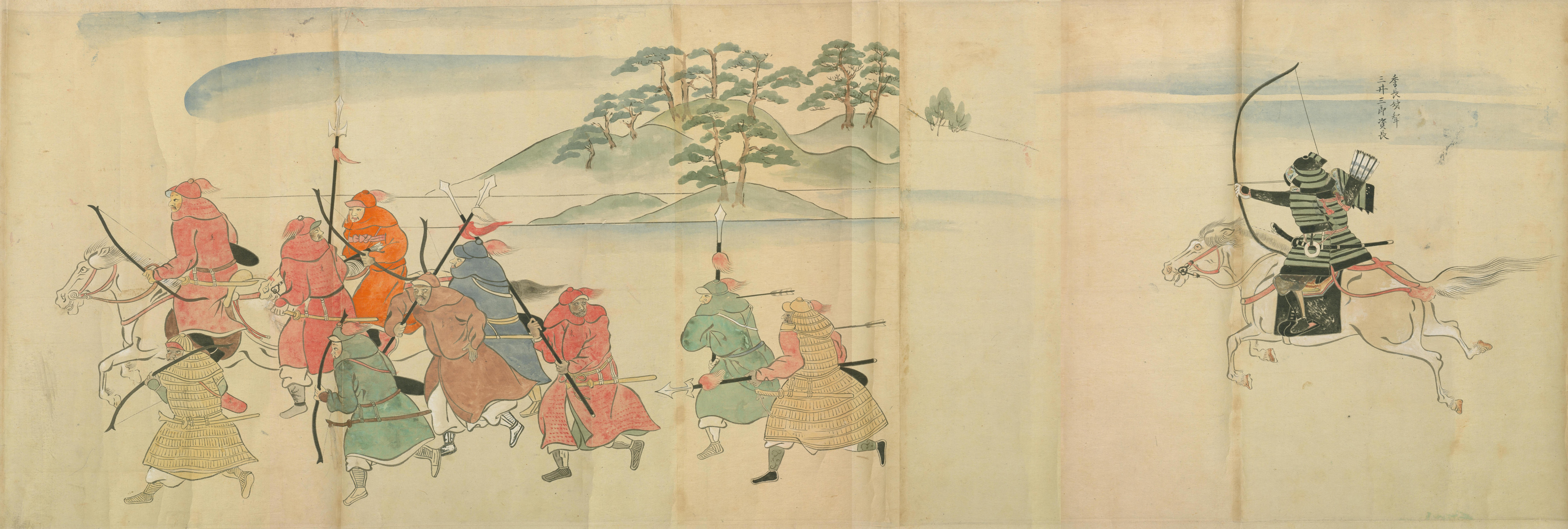
The mounted warrior on the right in the front scroll of the Mōko Shūrai Ekotoba is Mitsui Sukenaga.

During the Battle of Bun'ei, he fought alongside his brother-in-law Takezaki Suenaga against the Mongol forces. Sukenaga, Tsunenaga, and three attendants, a total of only five knights, chased retreating Mongol soldiers from Akasaka and charged into the Mongol army that had deployed from Sohara-yama, sustaining arrow wounds. When Tsunenaga reported their achievements to Adachi Yasumori's residence in Kamakura, it was mentioned that both Tsunenaga, Sukenaga, and their attendants had sustained injuries to their hands.

== See also ==
- Mongol invasions of Japan
- Battle of Bun'ei
- Battle of Kōan
