= Shōni Kagesuke =

Samurai commander (1246–1285)

Shōni Kagesuke (少弐 景資; 1246 – 1285) was the commander of the Japanese forces at the Battle of Kōan during the Mongol invasions of Japan.

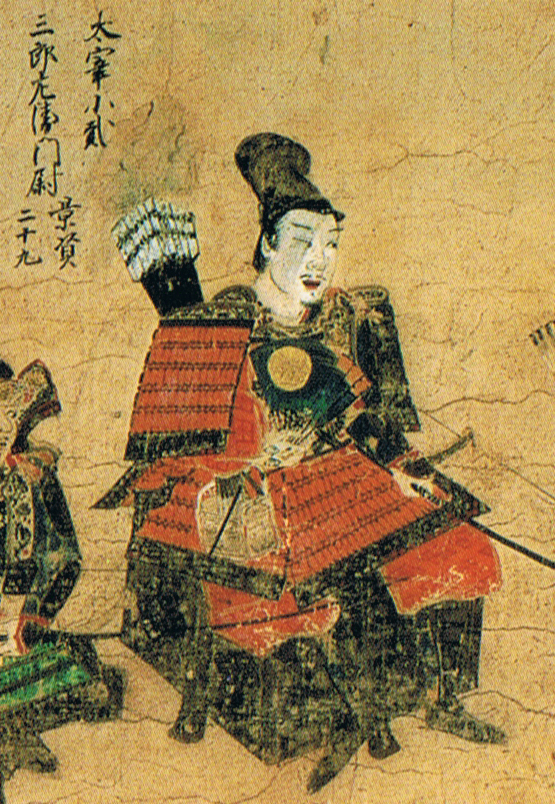
Kagesuke in the Mōko Shūrai Ekotoba
