= Genkō Shakusho =

1322 literary work on Japanese Buddhism

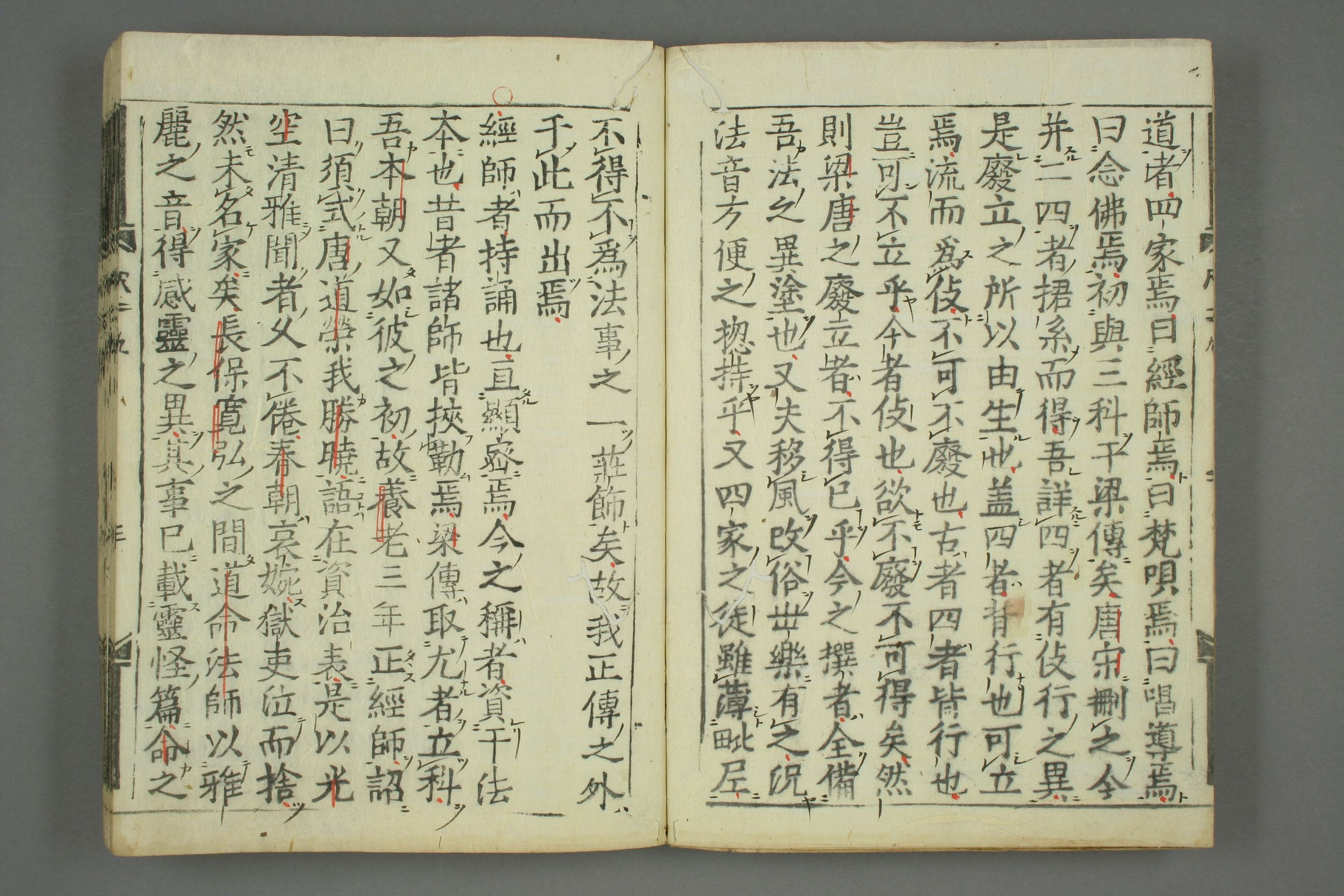
A section of the Genko Syakusyo

The Genkō Shakusho (元亨釈書) is the first Japanese Buddhist history. It was written during the Kamakura period in Classical Chinese by the famous Rinzai monk Kokan Shiren (1278–1346) and in total consists of 30 scrolls.

Kokan Shiren wrote the Genkō Shakusho in 1322; the literal translation of the title is the "Genkō Era Buddhist History." In the introduction to the work, Kokan wrote that he was shamed into writing it after the Chinese monk Yishan Yining expressed his surprise that no such history existed in Japan. The book was first published between 1346–1377. It covers a span of seven hundred years in Japanese Buddhist history and biographies from its introduction into Japan until the late Kamakura period. It was accepted into the Buddhist Tripitaka during the Nanboku-chō period.

== Structure ==
The Genkō Shakusho has three divisions:

1. Biographies scrolls 1–19 with four hundred and six titles of monastic and secular biographies
2. History scrolls 20–26 covering seven hundred years Buddhist history until the late Kamakura period (Note: Muller contains materials in tables. --> historical materials in chronological tables.) (Note: Soka Gakkai chronological tables of Japanese Buddhist history from 540–1221.)
3. Gazettes scrolls 27–30 covering ten different other types of histories (Note: Muller ten essays on developments in Japanese Buddhism.)

== Sources ==
- Foguangshan Foundation for Buddhist Culture and Education (佛光山文教基金會) (1989). 元亨釋書 [Yuanheng Shishu [Genkō Shakusho]]. 佛光山大詞典 (Foguangshan Dictionary of Buddhism) (in Traditional Chinese). p. 1604. ISBN 9789574571956.
- Grace, Stephan (2019). Muller, A. Charles (ed.). Digital Dictionary of Buddhism 元亨釋書 [Genkō Shakusho]. "login as 'guest'"
- The Soka Gakkai Dictionary of Buddhism (2019). Genkō Era Biographies of Eminent Priests, The.
