= Gen'ō =

Period of Japanese history (1319–1321)

Gen'ō 元応
- April 1319 – February 1321
Bunpō	Genkō
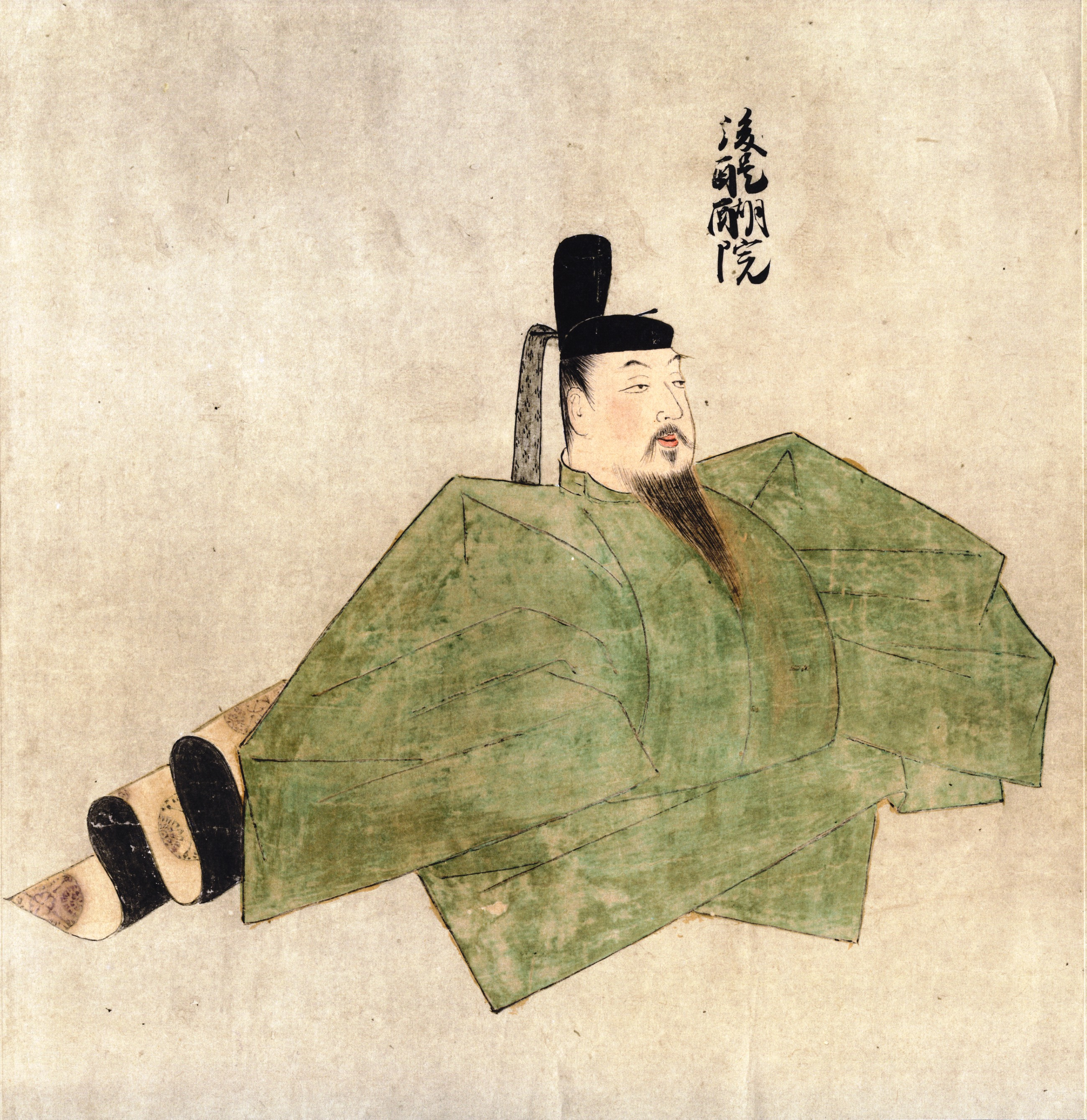
- Emperor Go-Daigo
- Location: Japan
- Monarch: Emperor Go-Daigo

Gen'ō (元応) was a Japanese era name (年号, nengō; "year name") after Bunpō and before Genkō. This period spanned the period from April 1319 through February 1321. The reigning Emperor was Go-Daigo-tennō (後醍醐天皇).

== Change of era ==
- 1319 Gen'ō gannen (元応元年): The new era name was created to mark the accession of Emperor Go-Daigo and the beginning of his reign. The previous era ended and the new one commenced in Bunpō 3. The era name was taken from the Old Book of Tang.

== Events of the Gen'ō era ==
After the abdication of Emperor Hanazono in Bunpō 2, Takaharu-shinno was proclaimed emperor at the age of 31. Nijō Michihira was kampaku (chancellor); but the court remained under the direction of former-Emperor Go-Uda. Prince Morikuni was the shōgun in Kamakura; and the daimyō of Sagami, Hōjō Takatoki, was shikken or chief minister of the shogunate.

- 1319 (Gen'ō 1', 3rd month): Prince Kuniyoshi, the son of former-Emperor Go-Nijō, was declared Crown Prince (tōgu).
- 1319 (Gen'ō 1, 6th month): The sadaijin (minister of the left), Konoe Tsunehira, died.
- 1319 (Gen'ō 1, in the 8th month): The emperor took Kishi, the daughter of Saionji Sanekane, as one of his concubines; and she became a favorite. In addition, he had many concubines, which meant that he had many sons and daughters.
- 1319 (Gen'ō 1, 12th month): Nijō Michihira was obliged to resign his position as kampaku because of pressure from the bakufu in Kamakura; and Ichijō Uchitsune became kampaku instead.
- 1330 (Gen'ō 2, 5th month): Hōjō Tokiasu, the kanrei in Kyoto, died at Rokuhara mansion, which was the stronghold of the Kamakura shogunate in the capital. Tokiasu's shogunate position was also known as Rokuhara Tandai and Kitakata.
- 1320 (Gen'ō 2, 5th month): The former regent, Kujō Moronori died at age 48.

== Notes ==
Preceded by Bunpō	Era or nengō Gen'ō; 1319–1321	Succeeded by Genkō
