= Shōchū (era) =

Period of Japanese history (1324–1326 CE)

Shōchū 正中
- December 1324 – April 1326
Genkō	Karyaku
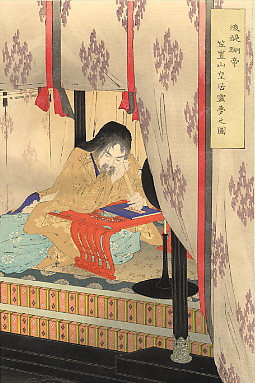
- Emperor Go-Daigo
- Location: Japan
- Monarch: Emperor Go-Daigo

Shōchū (正中) was a Japanese era name (年号, nengō; lit. "year name") after Genkō and before Karyaku. This period spanned the years from December 1324 to April 1326. The reigning Emperor was Go-Daigo-tennō (後醍醐天皇).

== Change of era ==
- 1324 Shōchū gannen (正中元年): The new era name was created to mark an event or series of events. The previous era ended and the new one commenced in Genkō 4.

== Events of the Shōchū era ==
- 1324 (Shōchū 1, 1st month): The nadaijin Saionji Kinsighe died at age 41.
- 1324 (Shōchū 1, 3rd month): The emperor visited the Iwashimizu Shrine.
- 1324 (Shōchū 1, 3rd month): The emperor visited the Kamo Shrines.
- 1324 (Shōchū 1, 5th month): Konoe Iehira died. He had been kampaku during the reign of Emperor Hanazono.
- 1324 (Shōchū 1, 6th month): The former-Emperor Go-Uda died at age 58.
- '1325 (Shōchū 2, 6th month): The former-shōgun, Prince Koreyasu, died at age 62.
- 1325 (Shōchū 2, 12th month): The former-kampaku, Ichijō Uchitsune, died at age 36.
- 1326 (Shōchū 3): Go-Daigo's favorite, Empress Kishi, appeared to be pregnant, and the eager father-to-be visited her quarters daily; but this hope turned to regret when it turned out to be a false pregnancy.

== Notes ==
Preceded by Genkō	Era or nengō Shōchū; 1324–1326	Succeeded by Karyaku
