= Bunpō =

Period of Japanese history (1317–1319 CE)

Bunpō 文保
- February 1317 – April 1319
| Shōwa | Gen'ō |
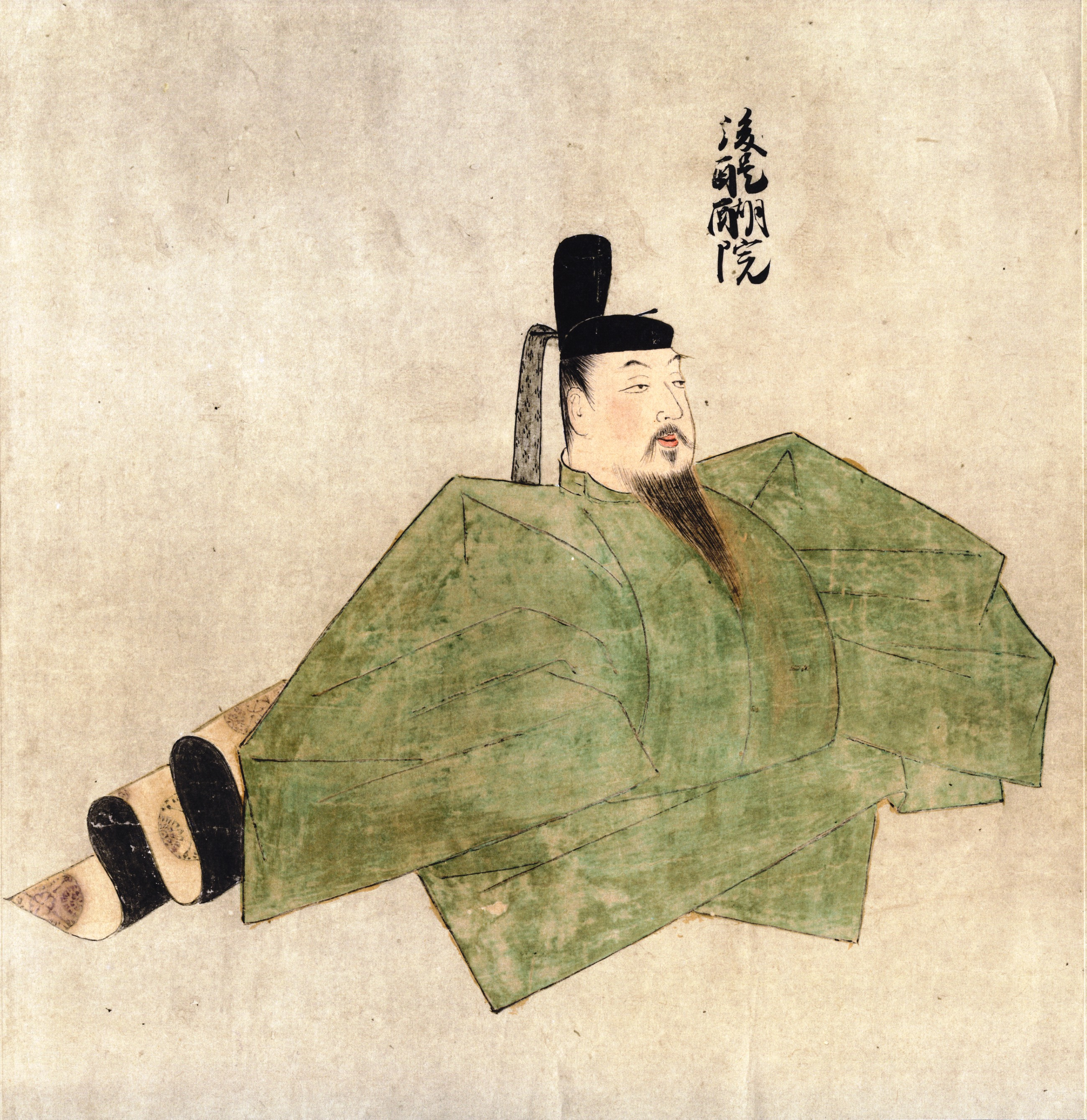
- Emperor Go-Daigo, who assumed the throne in 1318.
- Location: Japan
- Monarch(s): Emperor Hanazono; Emperor Go-Daigo

Bunpō (文保) was a Japanese era name (年号, nengō; "year name") after Shōwa and before Gen'ō. This period spanned the years from February 1317 to April 1319. The reigning Emperors were Emperor Hanazono-tennō (花園天皇) and Go-Daigo-tennō (後醍醐天皇).

== Change of era ==
- 1317 (Bunpō gannen 文保元年): The new era name was created to mark an event or series of events. The previous era ended and the new one commenced in Shōwa 6. The name was taken from the Book of Liang (AD 635) and means "elegant protection."

== Events of the Bunpō era ==
During this era, Negotiations between the Bakufu and the two lines resulted in an agreement to alternate the throne between the two lines every 10 years (the Bunpō Agreement). This agreement did not last very long, being broken by Emperor Go-Daigo.

- 1317 (Bunpō 1, 9th month): Former-Emperor Fushimi died at age 53 years.
- 1318 (Bunpō 2, 2nd month): In the 11th year of Hanazono-tennō's reign (花園天皇11年), the emperor abdicated; and the succession (senso) was received by his cousin, the second son of former-Emperor Go-Uda. Shortly thereafter, Emperor Go-Daigo is said to have acceded to the throne (sokui).
- 1319 (Bunpō 3, 4th month): Emperor Go-Daigo caused the nengō to be changed to Gen'ō to mark the beginning of his reign.

== Notes ==
| Preceded by Shōwa (正和) | Era of Japan; Bunpō; 1317–1319 | Succeeded by Gen'ō |
