= Jōryū-ji =

Buddhist temple in Kanagawa Prefecture, Japan

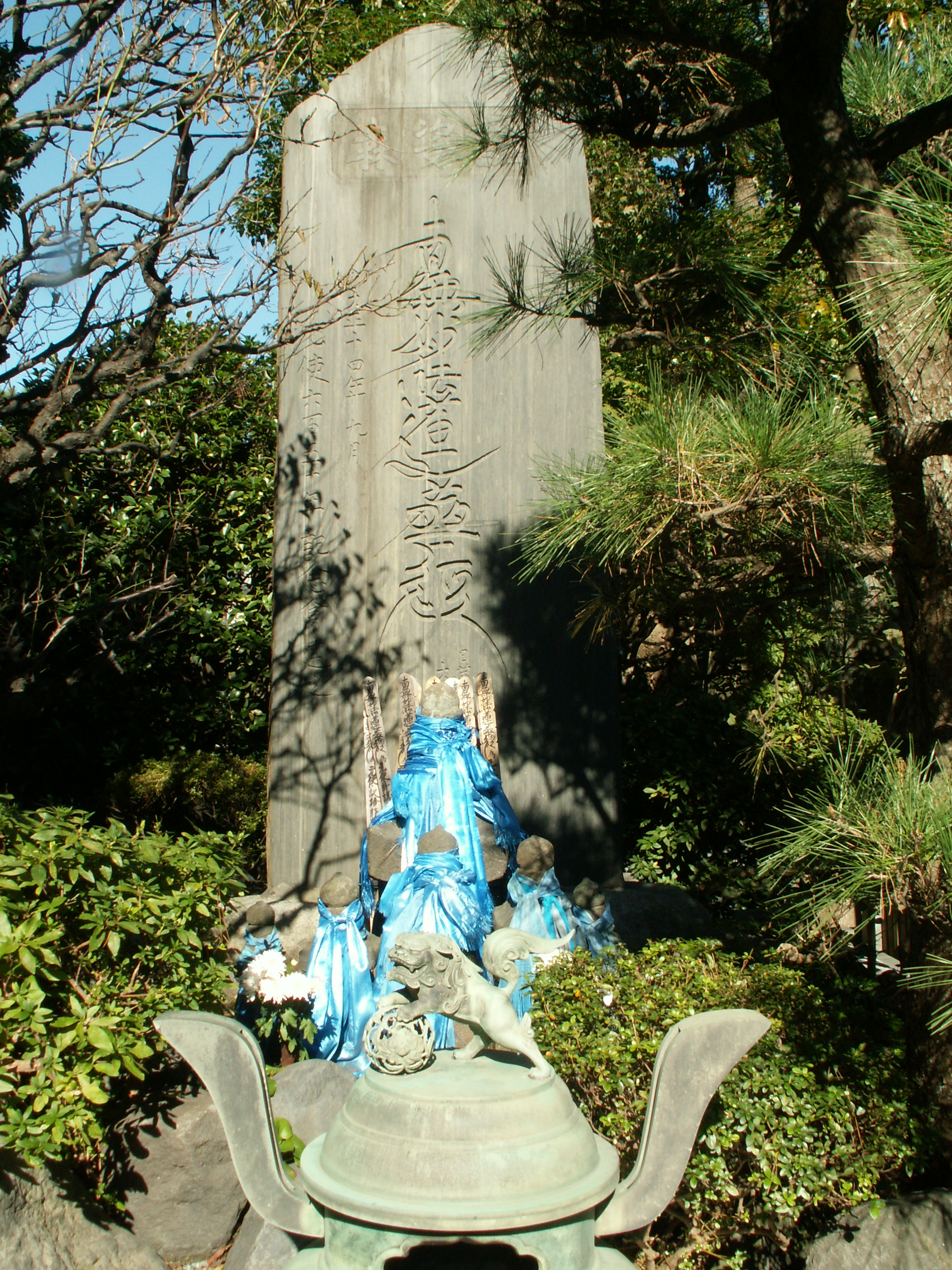
- Genshi-zuka

Religion
- Affiliation: Nichiren-shū

Location
- Location: 3-14-3, Katase, Fujisawa-shi, Kanagawa-ken
- Country: Japan
- Interactive map of Jōryū-ji
- Coordinates: 35°18′45.57″N 139°29′17.85″E

Architecture
- Founder: Unknown
- Completed: Unknown

Jōryū-ji (常立寺) is a Nichiren-shū temple in Katase, Fujisawa, Kanagawa. Its mountain name is Ryūkō-zan (龍口山).

The temple is known for the stele commemorating the messengers from Yuan Dynasty, including To Seichū (Du Shizhong, Chinese: 杜世忠), who were killed by order of Hōjō Tokimune. In 2007, it was visited by Nambaryn Enkhbayar, President of Mongolia.

It is famous for its weeping flowering apricot trees, which attract tourists in early spring when they begin to bloom.

The temple's former headquarters was Minobu-san Kuon-ji and the current headquarters is Hongaku-ji (Japanese: 本覚寺), often referred to as "Kuon-ji West".
