= Li Ting =

Li Ting may refer to:

- Li Ting (science writer) (born 1981), Chinese science writer and YouTuber
- Li Ting (diver) (born 1987), Chinese female diver
- Li Ting (tennis, born 1980), Chinese female tennis player
- Li Ting (canoeist) (born 1985), Chinese sprint canoer
- Li Ting (sitting volleyball) (born 1989), Chinese sitting volleyball player
- Li Ting (swimmer) (born 2001), Chinese para swimmer
- Li Ting (tennis, born 1991), Chinese female tennis player
