= Genkō (1321–1324) =

Period of Japanese history (1321–1324 CE)

Genkō 元亨
- February 1321 – December 1324
Gen'ō	Shōchū
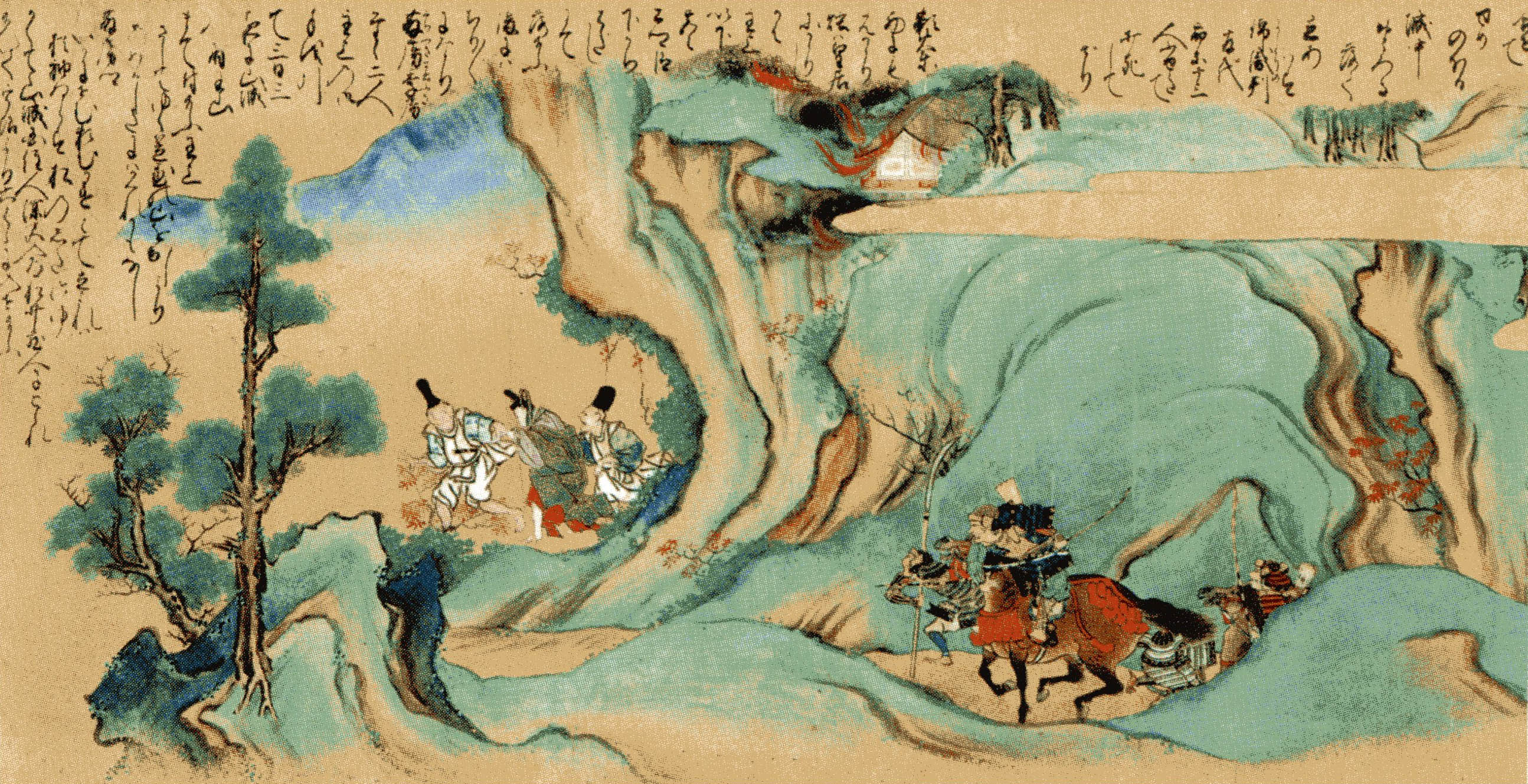
- Emperor Go-Daigo
- Location: Japan
- Monarch: Emperor Go-Daigo

Genkō (元亨) was a Japanese era name (年号, nengō; "year name") after Gen'ō and before Shōchū. This period spanned the years from February 1321 to December 1324. The reigning Emperor was Go-Daigo-tennō (後醍醐天皇).

== Change of era ==
- 1321 Genkō gannen (元亨元年): The new era name was created to mark an event or series of events. The previous era ended and the new one commenced in Gen'ō 3. The era name is derived from the I Ching; it should not be confused with the later Genkō (1331–1334), which used a different character for kō (弘, "wide", instead of 亨, "go smoothly.")

== Events of the Genkō era ==
- 1321 (Genkō 1, 2nd month): The udaijin Fujiwara-no Saionji Kinakira died.
- 1321 (Genkō 1, 4th month): The former-Emperor Go-Uda ordered the construction of a small chapel at Daikaku-ji where he lived in retirement.
- 1321 (Genkō 1, 5th month): The emperor visited Dikaku-ji to see this new chapel for himself.
- 1321 (Genkō 1, 6th month): Hōjō Kanetoki (北条兼時), the shogunate strongman in Kyūshū (called the Chinzei-tandai (鎮西探題)), died.
- 1321 (Genkō 1, 12th month): Hōjō Norisada, the daimyō of Suruga Province and a close relative of the shogunate's shikken, Hōjō Takitoki, was named governor of Kyoto at Rokuhara; and Hōjō Hidetoki was named military governor of Kyūshū.
- 1322 (Genkō 2, 1st month): The emperor visited the former-Emperor Go-Uda at Daikau-ji; and he was entertained by a musical concert.
- 1322 (Genkō 2, 1st month): Saionji Sanekane died at age 74.
- 1323 (Genkō 3, 3rd month): Ichijō Uchitsune lost his position as kampaku, and Kujō Fusazane was made his successor.
- July 16, 1324 (Genkō 4, 25th day of the 6th month): Former Emperor Go-Uda's death.

The oldest extant account of Buddhism in Japan, the Genkō Shakusho (元亨釈書), was completed in Genkō 2, whence the era name in its title. The massive project was the work of Kokan Shiren.

== Notes ==
Preceded by Gen'ō	Era or nengō Genkō; 1321–1324	Succeeded by Shōchū
