= Saionji Kishi =

Saionji Kishi 西園寺禧子
- High Empress (皇太后宮, Kōtaigō-gū)
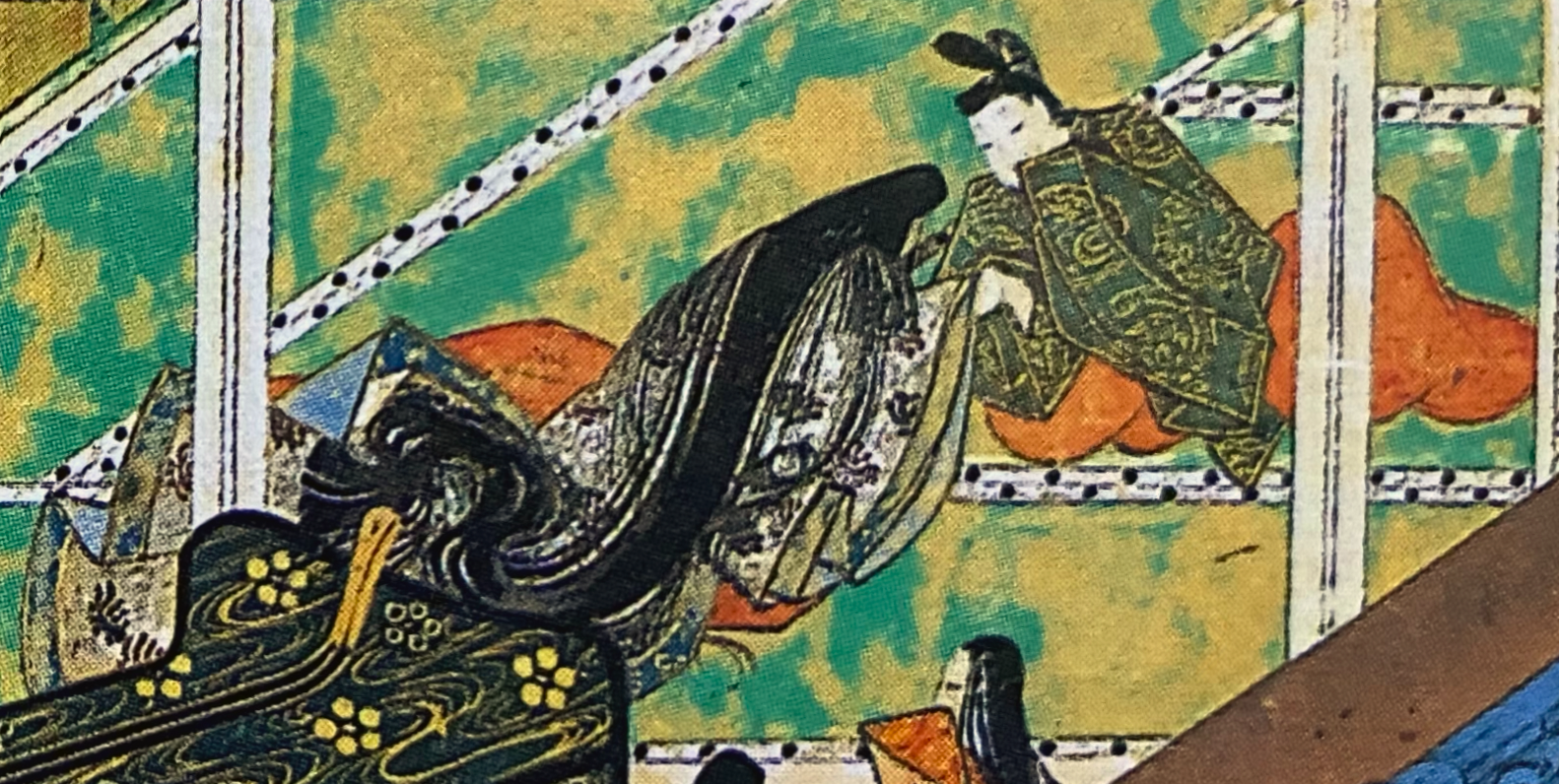
- Empress Kishi and Emperor Go-Daigo from Taiheiki Emaki (c.17th century)

Empress consort of Japan
- Tenure: 21 September 1319 – 19 November 1333
- Born: after c.1295 – before 1305; Heian-kyō (Kyōto)
- Died: 19 November 1333 (aged 27–c.38); Heian-kyō (Kyōto)
- Spouse: Emperor Go-Daigo
- Issue: Princess Kanshi
Regnal name
- Go-Kyōgoku-in (後京極院)
- House: Saionji (by birth); Imperial House of Japan (by marriage)
- Father: Saionji Sanekane
- Mother: Fujiwara no Takako (藤原孝子)

Saionji Kishi (西園寺 禧子; ? – 19 November 1333), or more formally Fujiwara no Kishi (藤原 禧子), was an empress consort of Japan. She was the consort of Emperor Go-Daigo of Japan. She was given the regnal name (join-gō (女院号)) Reiseimon-in (礼成門院) in 1332 when her husband was banished, but it was abolished when he returned to the Chrysanthemum Throne in 1333. Later she was given the second regnal name Go-Kyōgoku-in (後京極院) upon her death. She was also an excellent poet, 14 of whose waka poetry are included in chokusen wakashū (imperially-commissioned anthologies).

== Biography ==
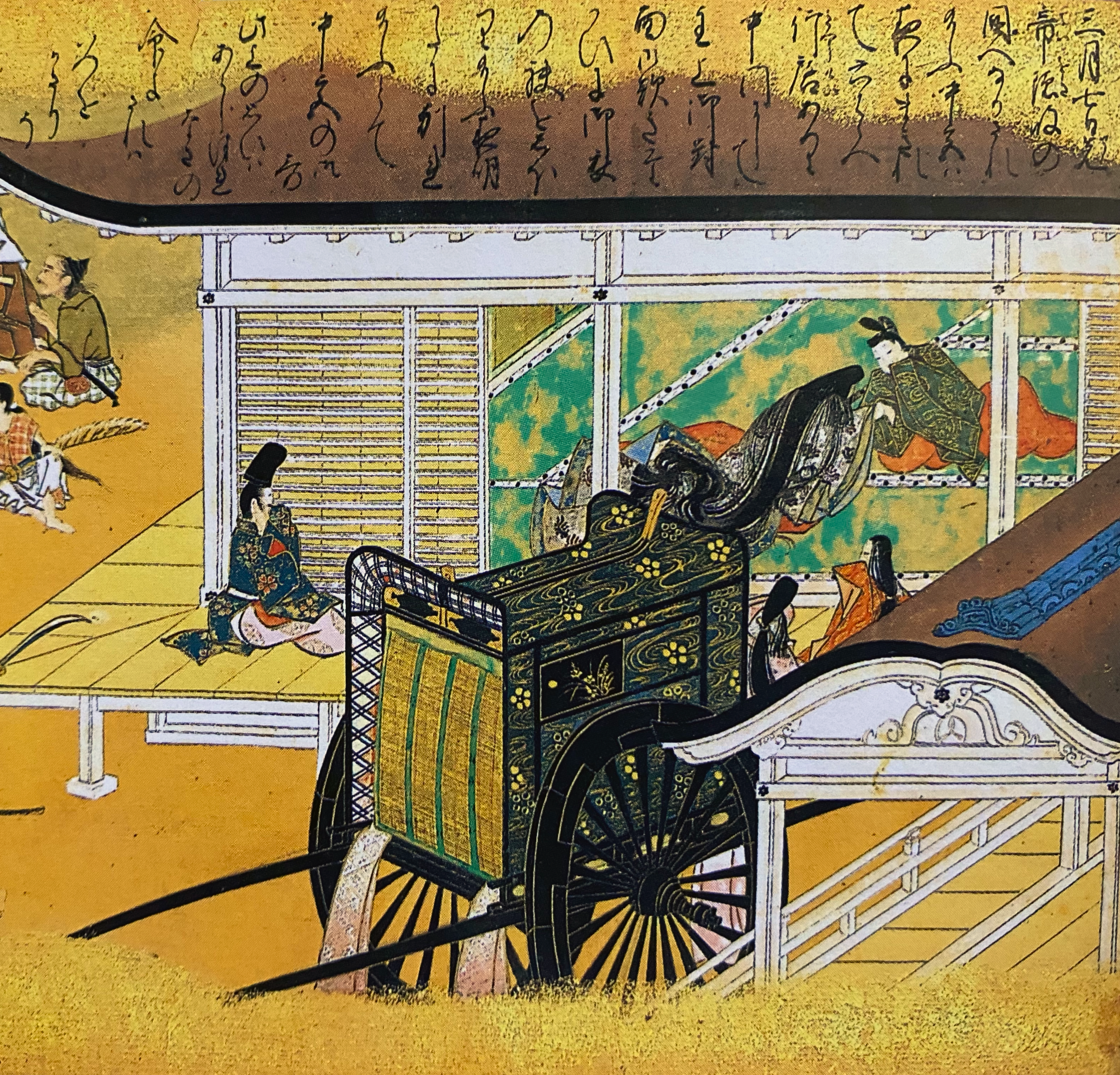
Kishi lamented that her husband was sentenced to exile. She then rushed to his prison by ox-carriage under the cover of night and stayed with him until morning. From Taiheiki Emaki (c. 17th century), vol. 2, On the Lamentation of the Empress. Owned by Saitama Prefectural Museum of History and Folklore.

She was born as the 3rd daughter of Saionji Sanekane (西園寺実兼). She eloped with then-Crown Prince Takaharu (later Emperor Go-Daigo) in 1313 and officially got married with him in 1314. Prince Takaharu acceded to the throne as Emperor Go-Daigo in the 2nd lunar month, 1318 and Kishi was made semi-Empress consort (女御, nyogo) in the 4th lunar month of the same year. She was made Empress consort (chūgū) in the 8th lunar month, 1319.

Although vol. 1 of the historical epic Taiheiki tells she lost the emperor's favor because of her lady-in-waiting Ano Renshi (mother of Emperor Go-Murakami), Hiromi Hyodo, a Japanese literature researcher, claims that the story is the imitation of a poem by Bai Juyi, and in the real history Kishi and Go-Daigo were a close and affectionate couple. Other sources such as vol. 4 of the same epic (as later illustrated in Taiheiki Emaki, vol. 2), Masukagami, several historical documents, and poetry by the couple's own hands, show the deep intimacy between the emperor and empress.

Emperor Go-Daigo was captured and exiled to the Oki Islands by the Kamakura shogunate in the 3rd lunar month, 1332 and Kishi became a Buddhist nun in the 8th month the same year. Emperor Go-Daigo escaped from the Oki Islands and returned to Kyoto in the 6th lunar month, 1333. After that, Kishi resumed the title of Empress consort (chūgū) and a little later was made High Empress (皇太后宮, kōtaigō-gū; de jure "Empress Dowager", but de facto higher consort-title than "Empress" (chūgū)). She died on the 10th lunar month 12th, 1333.

Issue:

- princess (1314–?), died young
- Imperial Princess Kanshi (懽子内親王) (Senseimon-in, 宣政門院) (1315–1362), Saiō at Ise Shrine; later, married to Emperor Kōgon

== Notes ==
Japanese royalty
Preceded by Princess Shōshi	Empress consort of Japan; 1319–1333	Succeeded by Princess Junshi
