= Tsuruga Nursing University =

Public University in Fukui, Japan

Coordinates: 35°38′44.8″N 136°2′4″E

- 敦賀市立看護大学; Tsuruga shiritsu kango daigaku
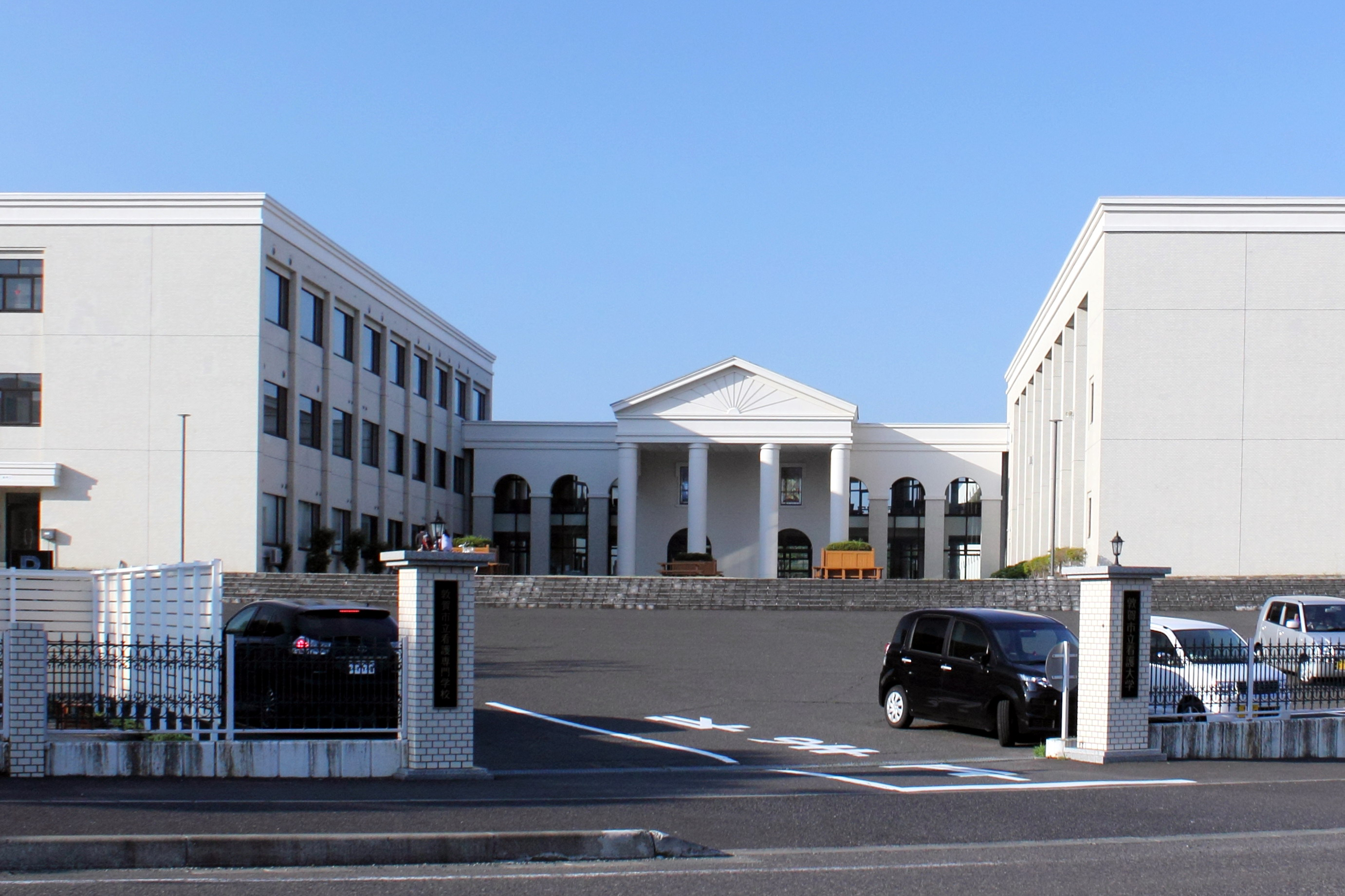
- Tsuruga Nursing University
- Type: Public
- Established: 2014
- Location: Tsuruga, Fukui, Japan
- Website: Official website

Tsuruga Nursing University (敦賀市立看護大学, Tsuruga shiritsu kango daigaku) is a public university in Tsuruga, Fukui, Japan, established in 2014. The predecessor of the school was the Tsuruga Nursing School (敦賀市立看護専門学校, Tsuruga shiritsu kango gakko), a four-year vocational training school which was established in 1948 and which closed in 2017. The campus of the Tsuruga Nursing University is the former campus of Tsuruga College, a private junior college which closed in 2014.
