= Yutahito =

Yutahito may refer to:

- Emperor Kōmyō (1322–1380), one of the Ashikaga Pretenders, 1336–1348
- Emperor Go-Horikawa (1212–1234), 86th emperor of Japan, 1221–1232
