= Tsunenaga =

- Prince Tsunenaga, one of the sons of Japanese Emperor Go-Daigo
- 11514 Tsunenaga, a minor planet
- Hasekura Tsunenaga, a Japanese samurai and retainer of Date Masamune, the daimyō of Sendai of Japanese imperial descent with ancestral ties to Emperor Kanmu
