= Kōmyō =

Komyo may refer to:

- Emperor Kōmyō (1322–1380), second Northern Emperor of Japan, or pretender
- Empress Kōmyō (701–760), consort of Emperor Shōmu
