= Princess Junshi =

Princess Junshi 珣子内親王

Empress consort of Japan
- Tenure: 13 January 1334 – 11 June 1337
- Born: 1311; Kyoto, Japan
- Died: 11 June 1337 (aged 25–26)
- Spouse: Emperor Go-Daigo
- Issue: Princess Sachiko
- House: Imperial House of Japan
- Father: Emperor Go-Fushimi
- Mother: Saionji (Fujiwara) Neishi

Princess Junshi (珣子内親王; 1311 – 11 June 1337), or Shin-Muromachi-in (新室町院), was a Japanese princess and an empress consort (Chūgū) of Emperor Go-Daigo of Japan.

She was a daughter of Emperor Go-Fushimi and the Court Lady Saionji (Fujiwara) Neishi. She was a younger sister of Emperor Kōgon, who was a member of the Jimyōin family line. For a period of time in the 13th and 14th centuries, the imperial line of succession would "swap" between two family lines: the Jimyōin and the Daikakuji. A Jimyōin emperor would be followed by a Daikakuji emperor, and so on.

In 1318, Go-Daigo, of the Daikakuji line, became emperor. In 1331, during the Genkō incident, his plot to overthrow the Kamakura shogun was discovered, and the shogun responded by removing him from the throne, replacing him with Emperor Kōgon of the Jimyōin.

In 1333, after much conflict, Go-Daigo re-took the throne. As part of his plan to neutralize the potential power of Kōgon and the Jimyōin family, Go-Daigo married Junshi - Kōgon's sister.

Later on, she became known as Empress Dowager Shin-Muromachi-in.

Issue

- Imperial Princess Sachiko (幸子内親王) (1335–?)

== Notes ==
Japanese royalty
Preceded by Saionji Kishi	Empress consort of Japan; 1333–1337	Succeeded by Unknown empress of Emperor Chōkei (next known empress: Tokugawa Masako)
