= Nijō Ishi/Tameko =

Japanese 13/14th century poet/royalty

- Crown Princess of Japan
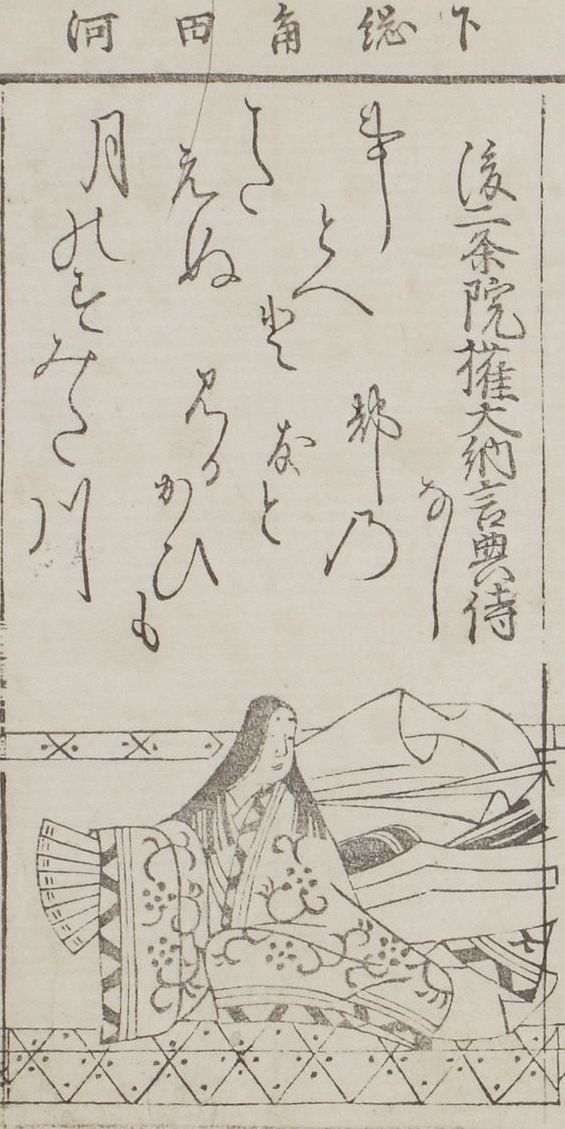
- Nijō Ishi; From Meisho Waka Hyakunin Isshu (1686); Go-Nijōin Gon-Dainagon Tenji
- Reign: 1308–1311 (1312)
- Native name: 二条為子
- Born: unknown
- Died: 24 September 1311 or 13 September 1312
- Noble family: Nijō; Fujiwara Hokke
- Spouse: Crown Prince Takaharu (later Emperor Go-Daigo)
- Issue: Prince Takanaga; Princess Tamako; Prince Munenaga
- Father: Nijō Tameyo
- Occupation: Yūgimon'in (Princess Reishi), wife and lady-in-waiting to Emperor Go-Nijō

Nijō Ishi/Tameko (Japanese: 二条 為子) was a representative poet of the Nijō poetic school in the latter half of the Kamakura period. She was rewarded with Junior Third Rank (贈従三位, Zo-Jusanmi) posthumously. (Note: Also, it is easy to confuse ‘‘Junior Third Rank Tameko’’ with ‘‘Junior Second Rank Tameko’’, who was a representative poet of the Kyogoku School of the same period.) She was a descendant of Fujiwara no Teika, and the daughter of Nijō Tameyo, a great poet. She was the wife of Crown Prince Takaharu-shinnō (later Emperor Go-Daigo-tennō).

At first, she served as Yūgimon'in to Princess Reishi, and later held an important position as Emperor Go-Nijō's lady-in-waiting. Around this time, the late 1300s, she started courting Imperial Prince Takaharu-shinnō, who was also a master of waka poetry. Following the death of Emperor Nijō in 1308, he became Crown Prince, and she became Crown Princess. She lived happily with Prince Takaharu-shinnō and had Imperial Prince Takanaga (also Takayoshi), and Imperial Prince Munenaga (also Muneyoshi), the most well-known poet of the Southern Court (also head priest of Enryaku-ji /Tendai-zasu), who died prematurely before he ascended the throne. Emperor Go-Daigo, who ascended the throne after Tameko's death, became a protector of the Nijō poetic school and worked to promote it. As a result, through Ashikawa Takauji, the first shogun of the Ashikawa shogunate and a poet, who admired Emperor Go-Daigo, the Nijō poetic school had been the leading school for more than 500 years in the Middle Ages, early modern period and late modern period.

Her poetic style was described as "gentle poetry" and 71 of her poems were collected in the Shingosen Wakashū (新後撰和歌集, New Later Collection of Waka), an imperial anthology of Japanese waka poetry. She influenced future generations, such as Kanze Nobumitsu’s noh play Momijigari (紅葉狩, Maple Viewing) (mid-Muromachi period). Her kiryoka (travelling poetry) was well received, and a poem about Sumida River was selected in the Ogura Hyakunin Isshu (小倉百人一首), the anthology of one hundred Japanese waka by one hundred poets (1686). In addition to poetry, she had knowledge of Chinese literature and excelled in writing. She was praised as "the wife of honour" ("the great woman") because of her versatile personality.

== Career ==
=== Imperial Poet ===
Born at the end of the Kamakura period as the daughter of Nijō Tameyo.Tameyo's father, Fujiwara Mikohidarike, was the head of the Fujiwara Hokke family and a great-grandchild to Fujiwara no Teika (also known as Fujiwara Sadaie), Tameyo himself was a major figure in poetry at the time being praised as "a master of the road, he dared to have no sword" (Hanazono Tenno Shinki /"The Records of Emperor Hanazono ") Tameyo was also the author of 2 of 21 imperially commissioned Japanese anthologies of waka poetry under the reign of Emperor Go-Uda: Shingosen Wakashū, the 13th anthology in 1303, and Shokusenzai Wakashū (続千載和歌集, "Waka Collection of a Thousand Years Continued"), the 15th anthology in 1320.

At first, Tameko served as Yūgimon'in to Princess Reishi, the favourite princess of Emperor Go-Uda. In 1303, she published her waka poems in the Kagen kyakushu, a 100-poem compilation of the Kōgen era hosted by Emperor Go-Uda (travelling poetry also included in the Gyokuyō Wakashū (玉葉和歌集, "Collection of Jeweled Leaves")). In 1303, her waka was selected in Shingosen Wakashū ("New Later Collection of Japanese Poems "), which was published in the same year, and she became an Imperial Compilation poet under the name Yūgimon'in Gon-dainagon.

=== Becoming a Crown Princess ===
In the 1300s, Tameko began courting Prince Takaharu-shinnō (later Emperor Go-Daigo). The exact circumstances of how they met remain unknown, but since Prince Takaharu was an unrivaled poet in waka poetry of his time, it is believed that they met through the hobby of waka. Japanese historian, Toshiharu Hirata, speculated that her eldest son, Imperial Prince Takanaga, was born during the Tokuji period (1306–1308).

In Masukagami, he expresses his infinite love for Tameko through the verses "When I was a boy, I thought endlessly". Furthermore, even in terms of status, she was regarded as the lawful wife of the heir (it is after the death of Tameko that Prince Takaharu meets Empress consort Saionji Kishi). For example, in Hanazono Tenno Shinki ("The Records of Emperor Hanazono"), the family of Nijō Tamesada (grandchild of Tameyo) is called "gaike" (the birthplace of an empress or queen). Although he was defeated, Prince Takanaga later ran for the political dispute over the next crown prince at the recommendation of his father (found on a rolled paper letter, in Tsurumi University Library). Prince Takanaga, the eldest son of both Tameko and Takanaga, was assigned to Yoshida Sadafusa, one of the chief retainers of the Daikakuji Fudai daimyō, to which Takanaga belonged, [in Masukagami ("Spring Farewell")].

In 1306, she recited 30 poems written by Emperor Go-Uda (in Gyokuyō Wakashū, "Collection of Jeweled Leaves"). In March 1307, she participated in Sentoeigu uta-awase (poetry contest), the Shinsenzai Wakashū ("New Waka Collection of a Thousand Years").

Around the time of the birth of her eldest son, Prince Takanaga (August 24, 1307), Yūgimon'in (Princess Reishi) died of a sudden illness. After that, she began to serve as lady-in-waiting Emperor Go-Nijō, (Note: As the Emperor could no longer have an empress and court ladies, there was a tendency for the court ladies to become the de facto concubines of the Emperor. However, at that time there were still concubines retaining their role as concubines, while others were acting as bureaucrats.) her husband's brother. In Gyokuyō Wakashū ("Collection of Jeweled Leaves"), she was called Go no Nijōin- Gon dainagon. However, about one year after the death of Yūgimon'in, Emperor Go-Nijō also died on September 10, 1308. With the sudden death of Emperor Go-Nijō, Prince Takaharu became Crown Prince.

After her eldest son, Tameko had Onnasan no Miya (女三宮), the third daughter of Prince Takaharu. In the Kokushi Daijiten (国史大辞典, "The Great Dictionary of National History") Onnasan no Miya is being referred to as Princess Tamako (1316–1339).

Furthermore, in 1311, she gave birth to Cloistered Imperial Prince Sonchō, the later Imperial Prince Munenaga.

However, Tameko died shortly after giving birth, long before her husband Prince Takaharu ascended to the throne in 1318. According to Tameosamushu (為理集), Tameko died on August 12, but the exact year of her death remains unknown. Shigeaki Mori, a Japanese historian, stated the year 1314 in the 1988/2007 revised edition, (Note: The year of Tameko's death (1314) theory claims that "Tameosamushu" was composed in three parts and that the part of the poem that is said to have been composed on the first anniversary of Tameko's death was established in 1315. This discussion seems to be found in the Reizei Shigure-tei Series, Vol. 74, "Medieval Private House Collection 10," p. 44, but it needs to be confirmed.) followed by the year 1311 or 1312 in the 1991/2013 revised edition. The Kokushi Daijiten states the year as ’around 1311’. Since Nijō Tamefuji, Tameko's brother was Saisho no Chujo ("Consultant Captain") from March 1309 to July 1313, it is possible to narrow down the year of death to 1311 or 1312. In either case, about five years after she met Prince Takaharu, she gave birth to Prince Munenaga and died shortly thereafter.

The fact that one of the leading poets of the Nijō poetic school and the future Emperor's wife died early shocked the members of the Nijō poetic school. Many influential poets wrote mourning poems that have been collected in the Shokusenzai Wakashū (続千載和歌集, "Waka Collection of a Thousand Years Continued"). In particular, Ton’a, who was one of the Waka Shitenno ("The Four Heavenly Kings of Waka"), wrote one dokueika (solitary poems) and three zotoka (exchanged poems) to mourn the death of Tameko. At that time, the Kyogoku school of poetry, which opposed the Nijō school of poetry, was regaining its power. The steadily editing of the imperial anthology Gyokuyō Wakashū (玉葉和歌集, "Collection of Jeweled Leaves") led by Fujiwara no Tamekane (also known as Kyōgoku no Tamekane), an opponent of Nijō Tameyo, further fueled the sorrow of the family.

=== After her death ===
In 1318, Imperial Prince Takaharu ascended the throne as Emperor Go-Daigo. When the compilation of the Shokusenzai Wakashū (続千載和歌集, "Waka Collection of a Thousand Years Continued") began, in memory of Tameko, he conferred her the Jusanmi (Junior Third Rank). Since then, Tameko has also been called Zo-Jusanmi Tameko (Junior Third Rank, posthumously conferred). According to Nobumitsu Kurihara, a woman of the late Edo period specialised in Yusoku-kojitsu (court and samurai rules of ceremony and etiquette), it is only after Fujiwara no Takushi (Sawako), the daughter of Emperor Ninmyo in the early Heian period, that the Emperor's daughter (second to Empress Chūgū) was conferred the Jusanmi (Junior Third Rank) after her graduation. It is very rare for a princess from the time of the Crown Prince to be conferred a Junior Third Rank. It is said that this shows Emperor Go-Daigo's special affection for Tameko.

== See also ==
- Fujiwara no Tamekane (藤原為兼, Fujiwara Tamekane; 1254–1332) Fujiwara no Tamekane (藤原為兼, Fujiwara Tamekane, 1254–1332), also known as Kyōgoku Tamekane (京極為兼), was a poet, an official in the Imperial court of Emperor Fushimi, and a senior bureaucrat of the Kamakura shogunate.
- Emperor Go-Daigo (後醍醐天皇, Go-Daigo-tennō; 26 November 1288 – 19 September 1339) the 96th emperor of Japan, according to the traditional order of succession. This was to be the last time the emperor had any power until the Meiji Restoration in 1868.
- Fujiwara no Teika (藤原定家, Fujiwara Sadaie; 1162 – September 26, 1241), was a Japanese poet, critic, calligrapher, novelist, anthologist, scribe, and scholar of the late Heian and early Kamakura periods. His influence was enormous, and he is counted as among the greatest of Japanese poets, and perhaps the greatest master of the waka form.
- Heian period (平安時代, Heian jidai) is the last division of classical Japanese history, running from 794 to 1185. The period is named after the capital city of Heian-kyō, or modern Kyoto. It is a period in Japanese history when Chinese influences were in decline and the national culture matured. The Heian period is also considered the peak of the Japanese imperial court and noted for its art, especially poetry and literature.

== Sources ==
- 不明 (1686), 名所和歌百人一首 (in Japanese), 平野屋喜平
- 稲田, 利徳 [in Japanese] (1984). 「草庵和歌集」の哀傷歌の世界 配列・構成・追悼対象など [The world of sorrowful songs from "Kusaan Wakashu" Arrangement, composition, memorial target, etc.] (PDF). 岡山大学教育学部研究集録 [Bulletin of Faculty of Education, Okayama University] (in Japanese). 66 (1). Faculty of Education, Okayama University: 1–19. doi:10.18926/bgeou/9232. ISSN 0471-4008. JPNO 00002799.
- 井上, 宗雄 [in Japanese] (1983), 増鏡, 講談社学術文庫 (in Japanese), vol. 下, 講談社, ISBN 978-4061584501
- 井上, 宗雄 (1997), 二条派, Kokushi Daijiten 国史大辞典 [Great Dictionary of National History] (in Japanese), Yoshikawa Kōbunkan
- 井上, 宗雄 (1997b), 二条為定, Kokushi Daijiten 国史大辞典 [Great Dictionary of National History] (in Japanese), Yoshikawa Kōbunkan
- 井上, 宗雄, ed. (2000), 中世和歌集, 新編日本古典文学全集 49 (in Japanese), 小学館, ISBN 978-4096580493
- 栗原, 信充 [in Japanese] (1843), 先進繍像玉石雑誌 (in Japanese), 知新堂
- 塙, 保己一, 1746-1821 (1893), "Shōkeimon'in o byōbu Osae shikishi waka" 昭慶門院御屏風押色紙和歌, in 経済雑誌社 (ed.), Gunshoruijū 群書類従 (in Japanese), vol. 7, 経済雑誌社, pp. 996–998, doi:10.11501/1879739, JPNO 20474265
- 小山, 弘志 [in Japanese]; 佐藤, 健一郎 [in Japanese], eds. (1998), 謡曲集, 新編日本古典文学全集 59 (in Japanese), vol. 2, 小学館, ISBN 978-4096580592
- 島内, 裕子 [in Japanese] (2020). 『先進繍像玉石雑誌』の研究─兼好伝の位相を中心に─ [A Study of Senshin Shuzo Gyokuseki Zassi─discussed around its biographical references to Kenko─]. 放送大学研究年報 [Journal of The Open University of Japan] (in Japanese). 37. The Open University of Japan: 146(1)–133(14). ISSN 0911-4505. JPNO 00043239. Retrieved March 25, 2020
- 鈴木, 淳 [in Japanese]; 小高, 道子 [in Japanese], eds. (2000), 近世随想集, 新編日本古典文学全集 82 (in Japanese), 小学館, ISBN 978-4096580820
- 次田, 香澄 [in Japanese] (1997), 藤原為子（二）, Kokushi Daijiten 国史大辞典 [Great Dictionary of National History] (in Japanese), Yoshikawa Kōbunkan
- 深津, 睦夫 [in Japanese], ed. (1997), 続後拾遺和歌集, 和歌文学大系 9 (in Japanese), 明治書院, ISBN 978-4625513091
- 森, 茂暁 [in Japanese] (1988), 皇子たちの南北朝――後醍醐天皇の分身, 中公新書 886 (in Japanese), Chuokoron-Shinsha, ISBN 978-4121008862
  - 森, 茂暁 (2007), 皇子たちの南北朝――後醍醐天皇の分身, 中公文庫 (in Japanese), Chuokoron-Shinsha, ISBN 978-4122049307 - 上記の文庫化
- 森, 茂暁 (1991), 太平記の群像 軍記物語の虚構と真実, 角川選書 (in Japanese), 角川書店, ISBN 978-4047032217 Retrieved October 24, 1991
  - 森, 茂暁 (25 December 2013), 太平記の群像 南北朝を駆け抜けた人々, 角川ソフィア文庫 (in Japanese), KADOKAWA, ISBN 978-4044092092 - 上記の文庫化. Retrieved January 25, 2013.
- 森, 茂暁 (2000), 後醍醐天皇 南北朝動乱を彩った覇王, 中公新書 1521 (in Japanese), Chuokoron-Shinsha, ISBN 978-4121015211
- 森, 茂暁 (2017), 足利尊氏, 角川選書 583 (in Japanese), KADOKAWA
