= Kōei =

Japanese era from 1342 to 1345

Kōei (康永) was a Japanese era name (年号, nengō, lit. year name) of the Northern Court during the Era of Northern and Southern Courts after Ryakuō and before Jōwa. This period spanned the years from April 1342 to October 1345. The emperor in Kyoto was Emperor Kōmyō (光明天皇, Kōmyō-tennō). Go-Kōgon's Southern Court rival in Yoshino during this time-frame was Emperor Go-Murakami (後村上天皇, Go-Murakami-tennō).

== Nanboku-chō overview ==
The imperial seats during the Nanboku-chō period were in relatively close proximity, but geographically distinct. They were conventionally identified as: Northern capital: Kyoto.; Southern capital: Yoshino.

During the Meiji period, an imperial decree dated March 3, 1911, established that the legitimate reigning monarchs of this period were the direct descendants of Emperor Go-Daigo through Emperor Go-Murakami, whose Southern Court (南朝, nanchō) had been established in exile in Yoshino, near Nara.

Until the end of the Edo period, the militarily superior pretender-emperors supported by the Ashikaga shogunate had been mistakenly incorporated in imperial chronologies despite the undisputed fact that the imperial regalia were not in their possession.

This illegitimate Northern Court (北朝, hokuchō) had been established in Kyoto by Ashikaga Takauji.

== Change of era ==
- 1342 Kōei gannen (康永元年): The era name was changed to Kōei to mark an event or a number of events. The previous era ended and a new one commenced in Ryakuō 5.

In this time frame, Kōkoku 1340–1346 was the Southern Court equivalent nengō.

== Events of the Kōei era ==
- 1342 (Kōei 1, 1st month): Ichijō Tsunemichi loses his position as kampaku; and he is replaced by Kujō Michinori.
- 1342 (Kōei 1, 2nd month): Minamoto no Nagamichi (源長通) is removed from his position as daijō daijin.
- 1342 (Kōei 1, 11th month): Kujō Michinori is replaced by Takatsukasa Morohira, who was formerly udaijin.
- 1342 (Kōei 1, 12th month): Fujiwara no Kiyoko dies. She was the daughter of Usesugi Yorishige and the mother of Ashikaga Takauji.
- 1343 (Kōei 2, 4th month): Nijō Yoshimoto, the author of Masukagami, was promoted from the court position of nadaijin to udaijin; and in due course, the udaijin was promoted to sadaijin. The dainagon was promoted to nadaijin.
- 1344 (Kōei 3, 1st month): Shōgun Takauji offered prayers at Iwashimizu Hachiman-gū.

== Notes ==
Preceded by Ryakuō	Era or nengō Kōei; 1342–1345	Succeeded by Jōwa
