= Kanagasaki Castle =

Historic castle ruins in Tsuruga, Hokuriku, Japan

Kanegasaki Castle 金ヶ崎城
- Tsuruga, Fukui Prefecture, Japan
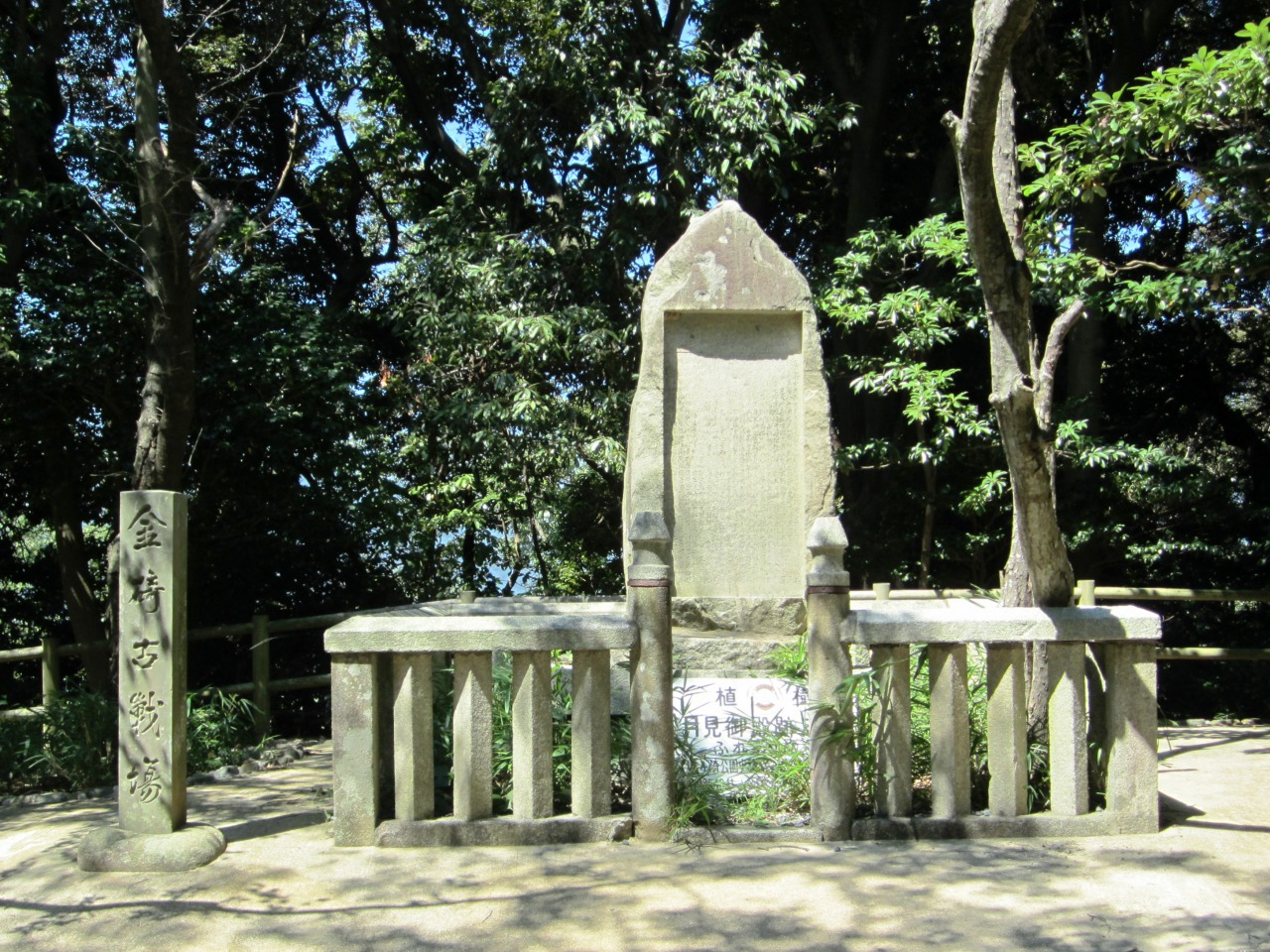
- Kanegasaki Castle site

Site information
- Type: yamashiro-style Japanese castle
- Open to the public: yes
- Condition: ruins

Location
- Location within Fukui Prefecture Location within Japan
- Coordinates: 35°39′57.9″N 136°4′27″E

Site history
- Built: Kamakura period
- Built by: Taira no Michimori
- In use: Kamakura to Sengoku periods
- Demolished: unknown

Kanegasaki Castle (金ヶ崎城, Kanegasaki-jō) was a Kamakura to Nanboku-cho period yamashiro-style Japanese castle located in what is now part of the city of Tsuruga, Fukui Prefecture in the Hokuriku region of Honshu, Japan. It was also known as Tsuruga Castle. The ruins have been protected by the central government as a National Historic Site since 1934.

== Background ==
Kanegasaki Castle is located on a small hill with an elevation of 86 meters above sea level in the northeastern part of the city of Tsuruga. A fortification was first constructed here by Taira no Michimori (1153-1184) while fighting against Kiso Yoshinaka in the Genpei War. All that remains at present are the remnants of stone and earthen enclosures, dry moats and the foundations of the central building and gate. A Shinto shrine, the Kanegasaki-gu was built near the base of the hill during the Meiji period.

== History ==
During the Siege of Kanegasaki, forces loyal to Nitta Yoshisada was trapped for three months at Kanegasaki Castle by Ashikaga Takauji. Nitta's ally Uryū Tamotsu was forced back to the Somayama Castle in March 1337, and Nitta Yoshisada joined him soon afterwards. A failed counter-attack from Somayama Castle failed to lift the siege against Kanegasaki, whose defenders were reduced to eating horseflesh to survive, and almost resorted to cannibalism before surrendering. Nitta Yoshiaki, (the son of Nitta Yoshisada) Prince Takanaga, and some 300 partisans of the Southern Court were killed or committed suicide when the castle fell.

Another battle was the Siege of Kanegasaki (1570) when the Oda Nobunaga led a failed attack against the forces of the Asakura clan. Toyotomi Hideyoshi, then known as “Kinoshita Hideyoshi” fought a celebrated rear-guard action by which Nobunaga was able to escape the defeat.

The castle ruins are about seven minutes by car from Tsuruga Station on the JR West Hokuriku Main Line.

== Gallery ==
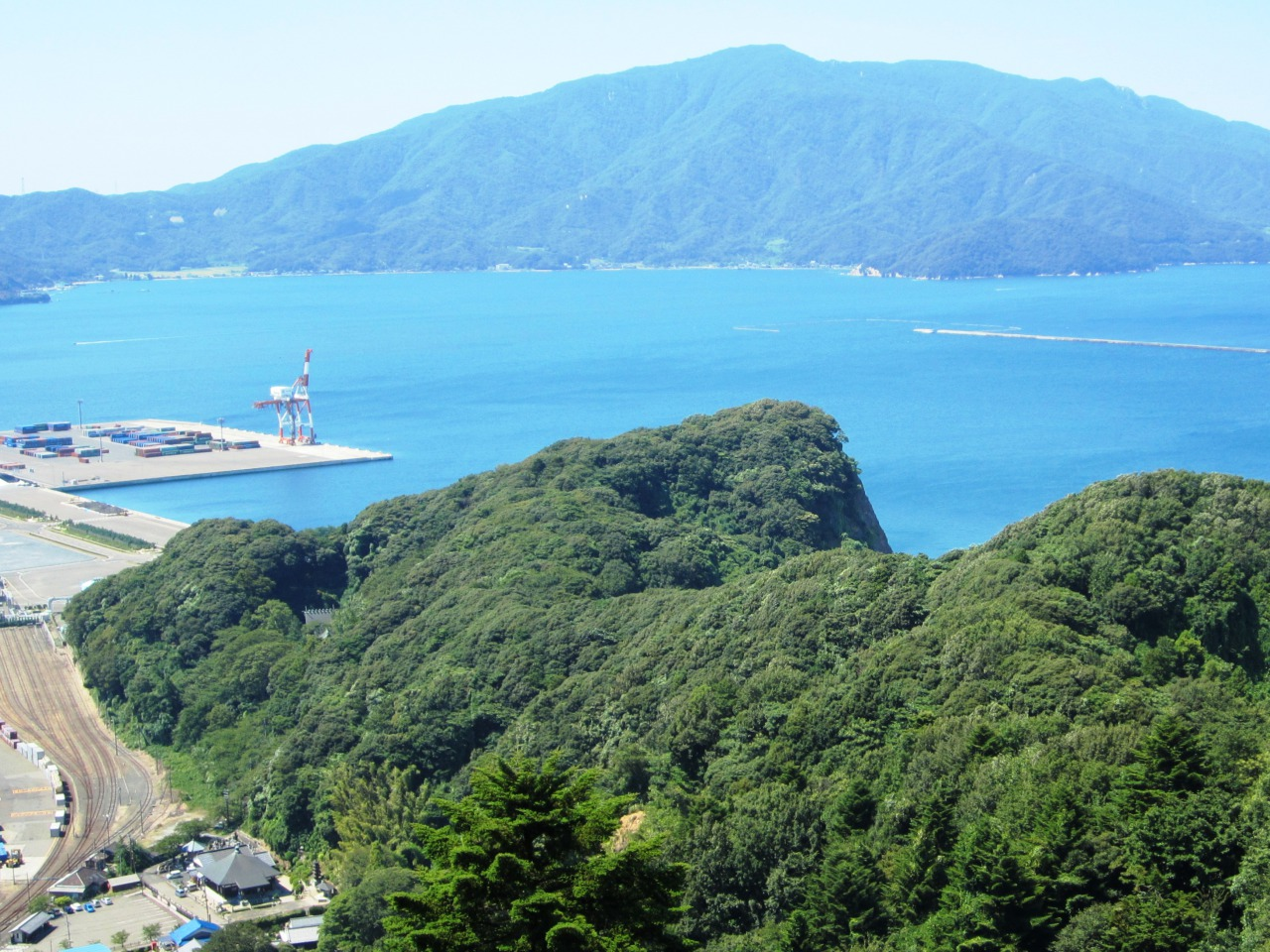
Kanegasaki Castle Site View from Mount Tezutsu

Kanegasaki Shrine in Tsuruga at night during the cherry blossom festival in late March

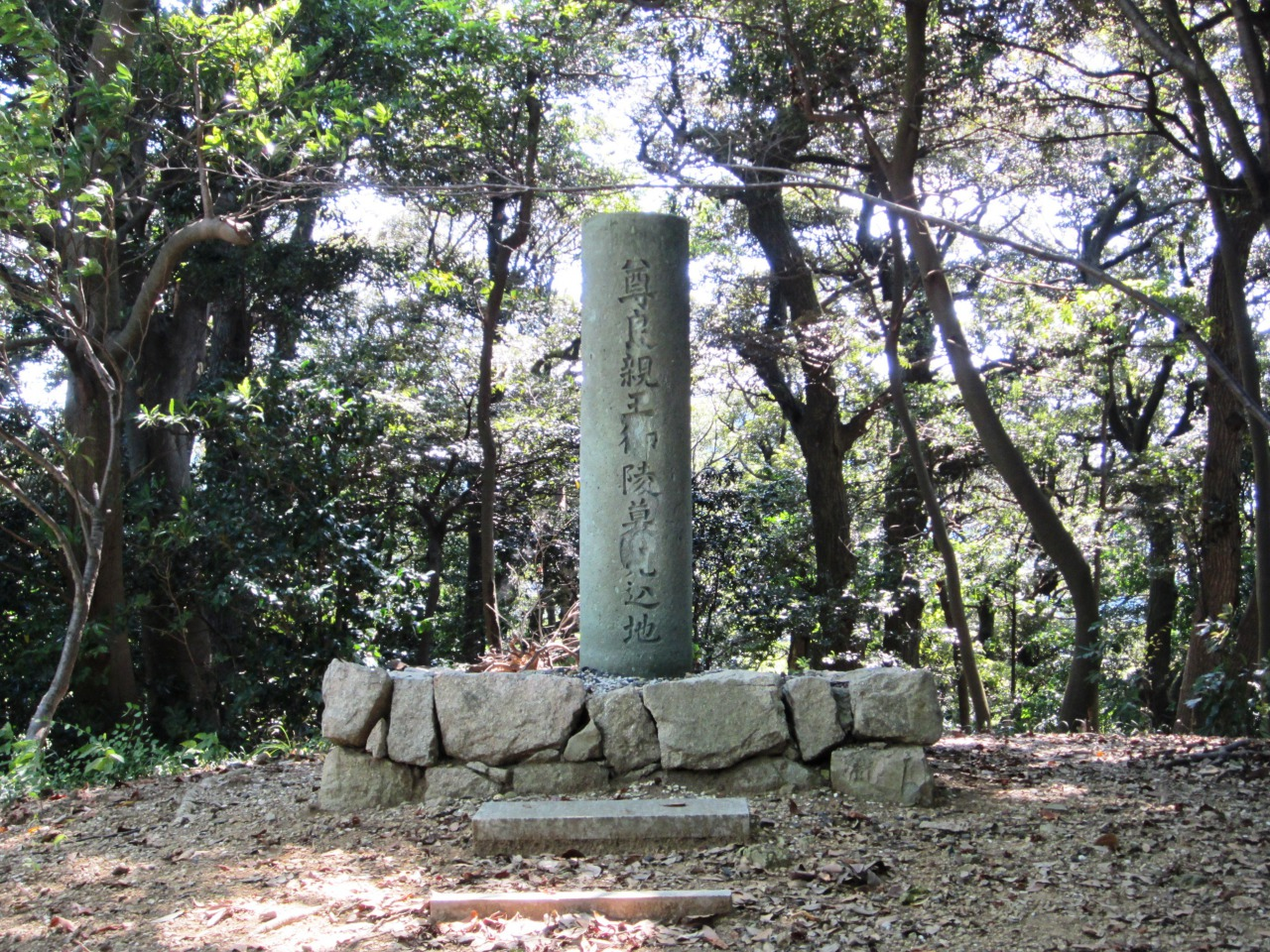
Memorial to Prince Takayoshi

== See also ==
- List of Historic Sites of Japan (Fukui)
