= Kōkoku =

Period of Japanese history (1340–1346)

Kōkoku (興国) was a Japanese era of the Southern Court during the Era of Northern and Southern Courts after Engen and before Shōhei, lasting from April 1340 to December 1346. The emperor in Kyoto was Emperor Kōmyō (光明天皇, Kōmyō-tennō). Go-Kōgon's Southern Court rival in Yoshino during this time-frame was Emperor Go-Murakami (後村上天皇, Go-Murakami-tennō).

== Nanboku-chō overview ==
The Imperial seats during the Nanboku-chō period were in relatively close proximity, but geographically distinct. They were conventionally identified as: Northern capital : Kyoto; Southern capital : Yoshino.

During the Meiji period, an Imperial decree dated March 3, 1911, established that the legitimate reigning monarchs of this period were the direct descendants of Emperor Go-Daigo through Emperor Go-Murakami, whose Southern Court (南朝, nanchō) had been established in exile in Yoshino, near Nara.

Until the end of the Edo period, the militarily superior pretender-Emperors supported by the Ashikaga shogunate had been mistakenly incorporated in Imperial chronologies despite the undisputed fact that the Imperial Regalia were not in their possession.

This illegitimate Northern Court (北朝, hokuchō) had been established in Kyoto by Ashikaga Takauji.

== Change of era ==
- Northern Court Equivalents: Ryakuō; Kōei; Jōwa

== Events of the Kōkoku Era ==
- 1342 (Kōtoku 3): Ichijō Tsunemichi loses his position as kampaku; and he is replaced by Kujō Michinori.
- 1342 (Kōtoku 3): Minamoto no Nagamichi (源長通) is removed from his position as daijō daijin.
- 1342 (Kōtoku 3): Kujō Michinori is replaced by Takatsukasa Morohira, who was formerly udaijin.
- 1342 (Kōtoku 3): Fujiwara no Kiyoko dies. She was the daughter of Usesugi Yorishige and the mother of Ashikaga Takauji.
- 1343 (Kōtoku 4): Nijō Yoshimoto, the author of Masukagami, was promoted from the court position of nadaijin to udaijin; and in due course, the udaijin was promoted to sadaijin. The dainagon was promoted to nadaijin.
- 1344 (Kōtoku 4): Shōgun Takauji offered prayers at Iwashimizu Hachiman-gū.

== Notes ==
Preceded by Engen	Era or nengō Kōkoku; 1340–1346	Succeeded by Shōhei
