= Prince Munenaga =

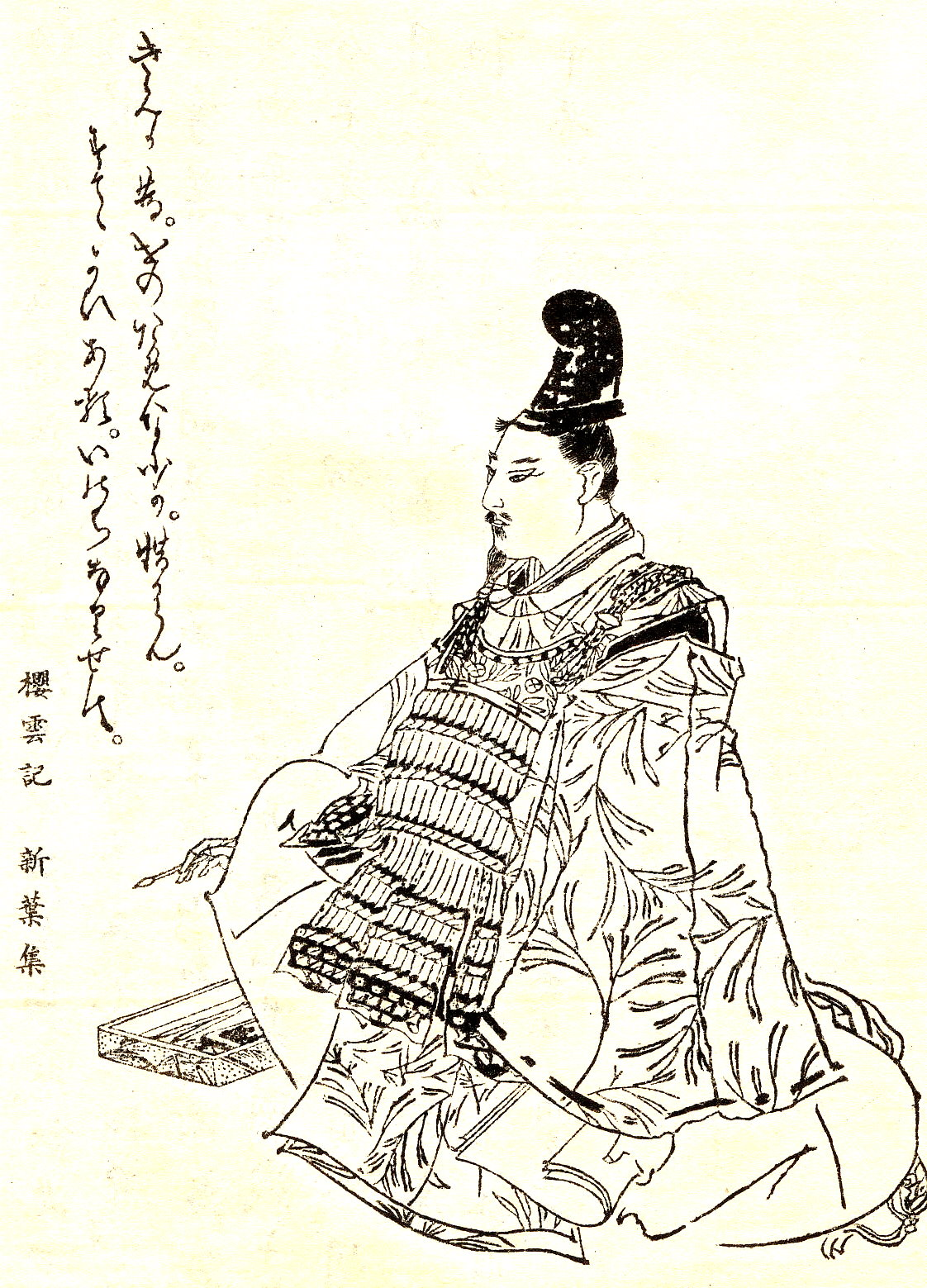
Prince Munenaga

Prince Munenaga (宗良 親王, Munenaga Shinnō; 1311–1385?), an imperial prince (the eighth son of Emperor Godaigo) and a poet of the Nijō poetic school of Nanboku-chō period, mostly known for his compilation of the Shin'yō Wakashū. His mother was the poet Nijō Tameko.

Prince Munenaga led a turbulent life, which quite likely served as an impetus for his poetic sensibility. In 1326 he took tonsure as a Tendai priest on Mount Hiei and swiftly advanced in his studies of the Buddhist doctrine.

In 1330 Prince Munenaga became the head priest of Tendai school, but was soon after banished to Sanuki in Shikoku for his participation in the Genkō War, where he had fought for his father's cause of imperial restoration. After three years of exile he marched his troops into Kyoto. Subsequently, when the imperial army lost to Ashikaga Takauji in 1336, Prince Munenaga took refuge on Mount Hiei with his father, Emperor Godaigo.

In 1338, when one of his relatives suggested that Prince Munenaga abandon resistance and return to Kyoto, the prince replied with this poem:

furusato wa
koishiku to te mo
mi Yoshino no
hana no sakari wo
ikaga misuten

Translation:

Yes, it is true,
I long for my home of old,
But how can I desert
Holy Yoshino, now that
The cherries are in full bloom.

Thus in an elegant poetic form Prince Munenaga replied that he would not abandon his father and stayed in the mountains of Yoshino to continue the fight despite all the hardships.

For the rest of his life, Prince Munenaga was at the head of resistance against the Muromachi bakufu and the Northern Court. The date of his death is uncertain, but some historians believe it to be around 1385 CE.
