= Ryakuō =

Period of Japanese history (1338–1342)

Ryakuō (暦応) was a Japanese era of the Northern Court during the Era of Northern and Southern Courts, after Kenmu and before Kōei, lasting from August 1338 to April 1342. The emperor in Kyoto was Emperor Kōmyō (光明天皇, Kōmyō-tennō). Go-Kōgon's Southern Court rival in Yoshino during this time-frame was Emperor Go-Murakami (後村上天皇, Go-Murakami-tennō).

== Nanboku-chō overview ==
The Imperial seats during the Nanboku-chō period were in relatively close proximity, but geographically distinct. They were conventionally identified as: Northern capital : Kyoto; Southern capital : Yoshino.

During the Meiji period, an Imperial decree dated March 3, 1911 established that the legitimate reigning monarchs of this period were the direct descendants of Emperor Go-Daigo through Emperor Go-Murakami, whose Southern Court (南朝, nanchō) had been established in exile in Yoshino, near Nara.

Until the end of the Edo period, the militarily superior pretender-Emperors supported by the Ashikaga shogunate had been mistakenly incorporated in Imperial chronologies despite the undisputed fact that the Imperial Regalia were not in their possession.

This illegitimate Northern Court (北朝, hokuchō) had been established in Kyoto by Ashikaga Takauji.

== Change of era ==
- 1338 Ryakuō gannen (暦応元年): The era name was changed to Ryakuō to mark an event or a number of events. The previous era ended and a new one commenced in Kenmu 5.

== Events of the Ryakuō Era ==
- 1340 (Ryakuō 3): Observations of the "broom star" (comet) are recorded.

== Southern Court Equivalents ==
- Engen, Kōkoku

== Notes ==
Preceded by Kenmu	Era or nengō Ryakuō; 1338–1342	Succeeded by Kōei
