= Kanegasaki-gū =

Shrine in Tsuruga, Fukui Prefecture, Japan

Kanegasaki Shrine 金崎宮
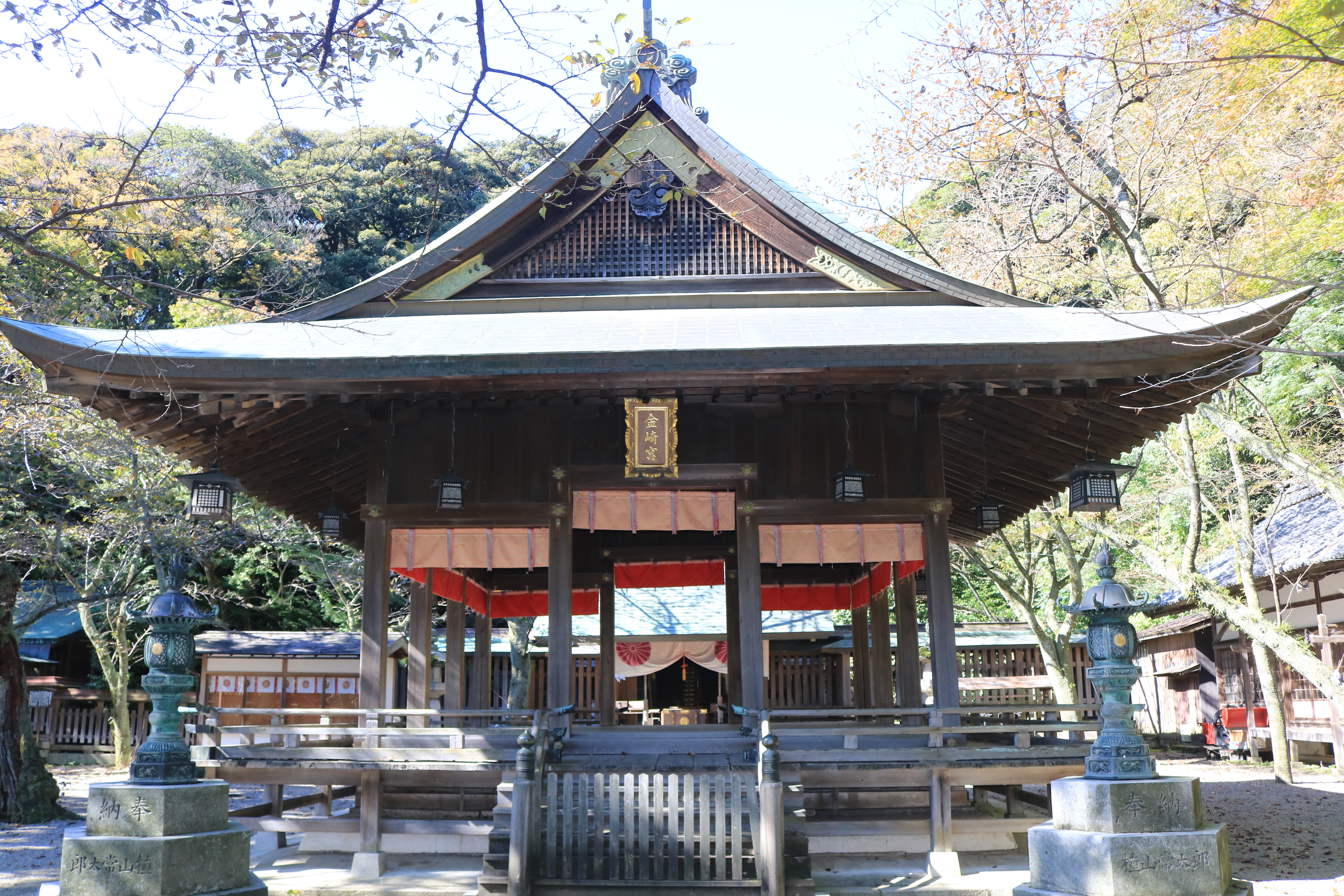
- Kanegasaki-gū

- Location within Japan

Religion
- Affiliation: Shinto
- Deity: Prince Takanaga and Prince Tsunenaga

Location
- Location: 1-4 Kanegasaki-cho, Tsuruga-shi, Fukui-ken 914-0072 Japan
- Coordinates: 35.6645°N 136.0741°E

Architecture
- Established: 1890

Website
- kanegasakigu.jp

Kanegasaki Shrine (金崎宮, Kanegasaki-gū) is a Shinto shrine located in the city of Tsuruga, Fukui, Japan. In the former Modern system of ranked Shinto Shrines, it was an imperial shrine of the second rank (官幣中社, Kanpei-chūsha). Its main festival is held annually on May 6.

It was founded in 1890 on the site of Kanagasaki Castle, where during the Siege of Kanegasaki (1337) a major battle was fought between the forces of Ashikaga Takauji and forces loyal to the Southern Court of Emperor Go-Daigo, led by Nitta Yoshiaki, the son of Nitta Yoshisada and the imperial princes Prince Takanaga and Prince Tsunenaga. The forces of the Northern Court prevailed, and Nitta Yoshiaki and Prince Takanaga took their own lives to avoid the disgrace of capture, whereas Prince Tsunenaga managed to escape but was captured and killed shortly afterwards.

It is one of the Fifteen Shrines of the Kenmu Restoration, built by the Meiji government to commemorate the events of the Nanboku-chō period and to promote loyalty to the Imperial family of Japan.

Stone steps up to Kanegasaki-gū shrine, Tsuruga

== See also ==
- Fifteen Shrines of the Kenmu Restoration
