= Engen =

Period of Japanese history (1336–1340)

Engen (延元) was a Japanese era of the Southern Court during the Era of Northern and Southern Courts after Kenmu and before Kōkoku, lasting from February 1336 to April 1340. The reigning Emperors were Emperor Go-Daigo and Emperor Go-Murakami in the south and Emperor Kōmyō in the north.

== Nanboku-chō overview ==
The Imperial seats during the Nanboku-chō period were in relatively close proximity, but geographically distinct. They were conventionally identified as: Northern capital : Kyoto; Southern capital : Yoshino.

During the Meiji period, an Imperial decree dated March 3, 1911 established that the legitimate reigning monarchs of this period were the direct descendants of Emperor Go-Daigo through Emperor Go-Murakami, whose Southern Court (南朝, nanchō) had been established in exile in Yoshino, near Nara.

Until the end of the Edo period, the militarily superior pretender-Emperors supported by the Ashikaga shogunate had been mistakenly incorporated in Imperial chronologies despite the undisputed fact that the Imperial Regalia were not in their possession.

This illegitimate Northern Court (北朝, hokuchō) had been established in Kyoto by Ashikaga Takauji.

== Northern Court Equivalents ==
- Kenmu (continued)
- Ryakuō

Preceded by Kenmu	Era or nengō Engen; 1336–1340	Succeeded by Kōkoku
