= Tsuruga College =

Coordinates: 35°38′44.8″N 136°2′4″E

Tsuruga College (敦賀短期大学, Tsuruga tanki daigaku) is a private junior college in Tsuruga, Fukui, Japan, established in 1986.
