= Prince Tsunenaga =

An 1884 depiction of Shinnō by artist Kobayashi Teiko.

Prince Tsunenaga (恒良親王, Tsunenaga-shinnō) (1324 – May 5, 1338) was one of the sons of Japanese Emperor Go-Daigo. He became involved in the Nanboku-chō wars between the true Imperial line and the Ashikaga clan.

In 1336, Tsunenaga was sent along with his brother Takanaga to be escorted by Nitta Yoshisada to Echizen Province where, it was hoped, they could escape the attacks of the Ashikaga. According to the epic Taiheiki, Tsunenaga was secretly made heir-apparent before he left, but no other documents confirm this. In fact, in November of that year, his brother Narinaga was officially named Crown Prince.

Fleeing the Ashikaga, Nitta brought the Princes away from Yoshino, where the Southern Court of Go-Daigo was based, towards Tsuruga in Echizen. They eventually made it to the castle of Kanagasaki. In January 1337 the castle came under siege, and by April those inside were reduced to eating horseflesh to survive before the gates were stormed. Tsunenaga escaped from the castle, but was captured and killed soon afterwards.

== See also ==
- Kanegasaki-gū
