= Saionji Neishi =

Saionji (Fujiwara) Neishi / Yasuko (西園寺（藤原）寧子) later Kōgimon'in (広義門院; 1292–1357) was a Japanese Court lady.

She reigned as the only female Chiten no Kimi (治天の君) between 1352 and 1353 by being granted the rank of Daijō Tennō.

She was Saionji Sanekane's daughter, and the consort of Emperor Go-Fushimi.

She became the mother of several children with the emperor:

- First daughter: Imperial Princess Junshi (珣子内親王)
- Third son: Imperial Prince Kazuhito (量仁親王) later Emperor Kōgon
- Fifth son: Imperial Prince Kagehito (景仁親王; b. 1315)
- Second daughter: Imperial Princess Kenshi / Kaneko (兼子内親王)
- Ninth son: Imperial Prince Yutahito (豊仁親王) later Emperor Kōmyō
