= Prince Takanaga =

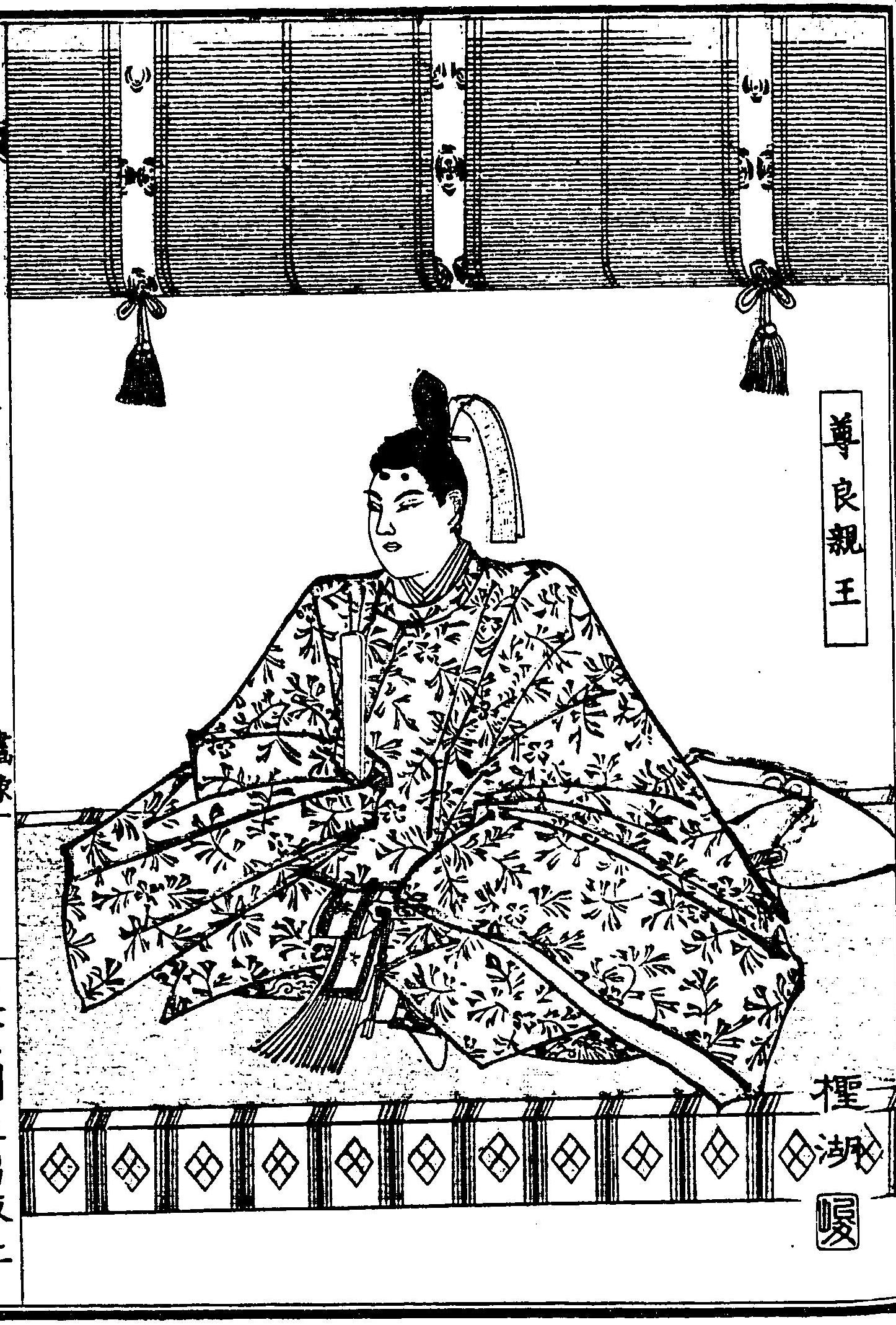
Prince Takanaga

Prince Takanaga (尊良親王, Takanaga shinnō; 1310–1337) was the second son of Emperor Go-Daigo of Japan.

== Family ==
Prince Takanaga was the son of Emperor Go-Daigo, and the poet Tameko.

== Life ==
Prince Takanaga fought for his father in the Nanboku-chō Wars. Since the characters used to write "Takanaga" can also be read as "Takayoshi", the prince is sometimes known by that name as well.

Appointed Seitō Shōgun (Commander-in-Chief of the Defense of the East) in November 1335, he was commissioned along with Nitta Yoshisada to destroy the Northern Court leaders Ashikaga Takauji and Ashikaga Tadayoshi.

Prince Takanaga fought a number of battles alongside Nitta and led his own force in besieging Kyoto in 1336.

In 1336, he was sent along with his brother Tsunenaga to be escorted by Nitta Yoshisada to Echizen Province where, it was hoped, they could escape the attacks of the Ashikaga. They made it to the stronghold of Kanagasaki. In January 1337 the castle came under siege, and by April those inside were reduced to eating horseflesh to survive, and almost resorted to cannibalism before surrendering. Prince Takanaga and Nitta Yoshiaki committed suicide as the castle fell.

== See also ==
- Kanegasaki-gū
