= Saionji =

Saionji (西園寺) is a Japanese family name of former kuge descent. People with the name include:

- The Saionji family, kuge family.
- Prince Saionji Kinmochi, 12th and 14th Prime Minister of Japan
- Empress Saionji, wife of Emperor Go-Fukakusa

== Fictional characters ==
- Chiaki Saionji of Demon Ororon
- Kaoru Saionji of Gakuen Heaven
- Kotoka Saionji of The Idolmaster: Cinderella Girls
- Kyoichi Saionji of Revolutionary Girl Utena
- Sekai Saionji of School Days
- Reimi Saionji of Star Ocean: The Last Hope
- Hiyoko Saionji of Danganronpa 2: Goodbye Despair
- Rika Saionji of Yamada-kun and the Seven Witches
- Takato Saionji of Buriki One
- Ukyo Saionji of Dr.Stone
- Enju Saion-ji of Moe! Ninja Girls by NTT Solmare
