= Tsuruga =

City in Fukui, Japan

Tsuruga 敦賀市
- City
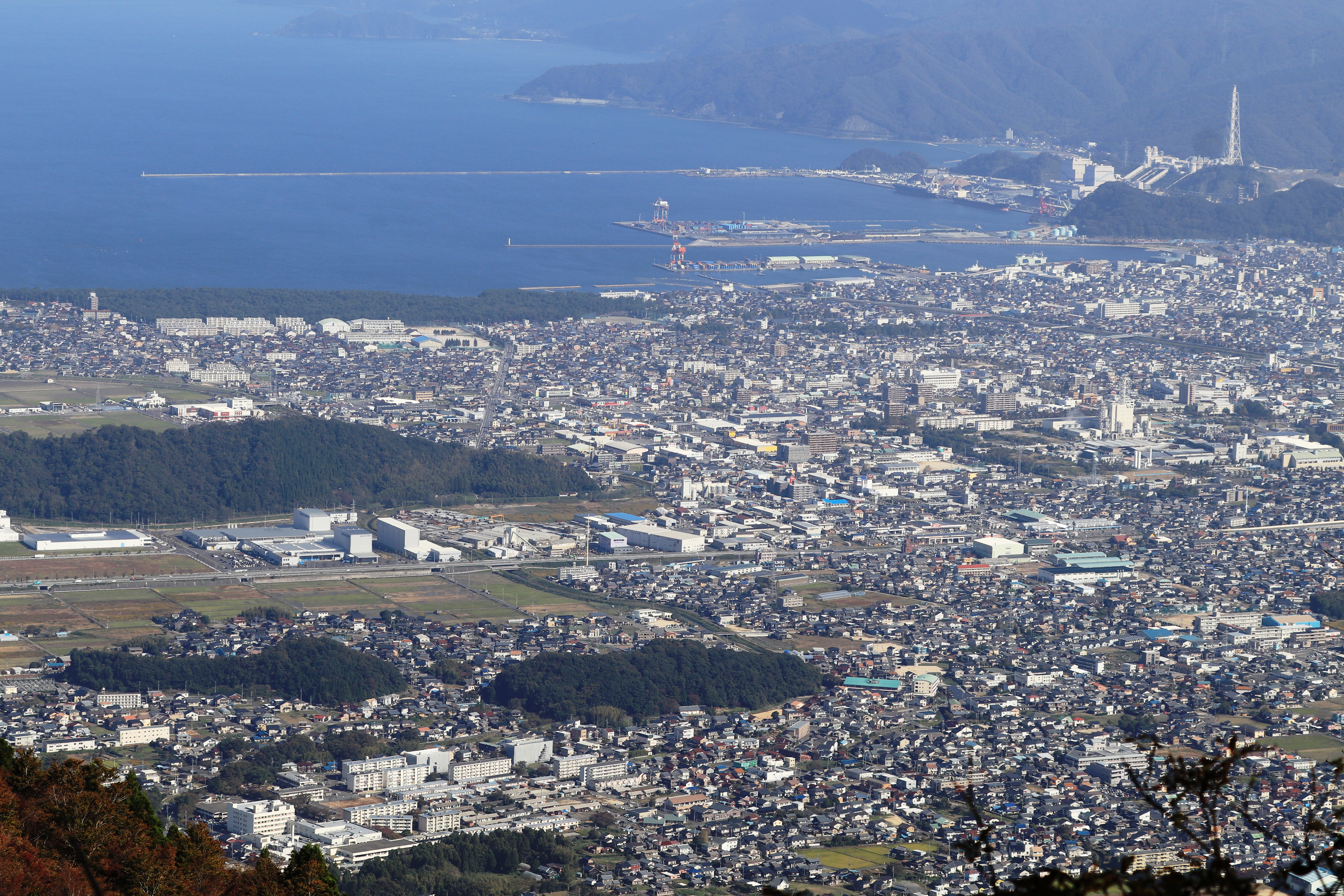
- View of Tsuruga

- Flag Seal

- Location of Tsuruga in Fukui Prefecture

- Coordinates: 35°38′42.7″N 136°3′19.8″E
- Country: Japan
- Region: Chūbu (Hokuriku)
- Prefecture: Fukui

Government
  - - Mayor: Kōji Yonezawa

Area
  - Total: 251.39 km^{2} (97.06 sq mi)

Population (June 29, 2018)
  - Total: 66,123
  - Density: 263.03/km^{2} (681.24/sq mi)
- Time zone: UTC+9 (Japan Standard Time)
- Phone number: 0770-21-1111
- Address: 2-1-1 Chūō-chō, Tsuruga-shi, Fukui-ken 914-8501
- Climate: Cfa
- Website: www.city.tsuruga.lg.jp
- Symbols
- Bird: Black-headed gull
- Flower: Lespedeza
- Tree: Pine

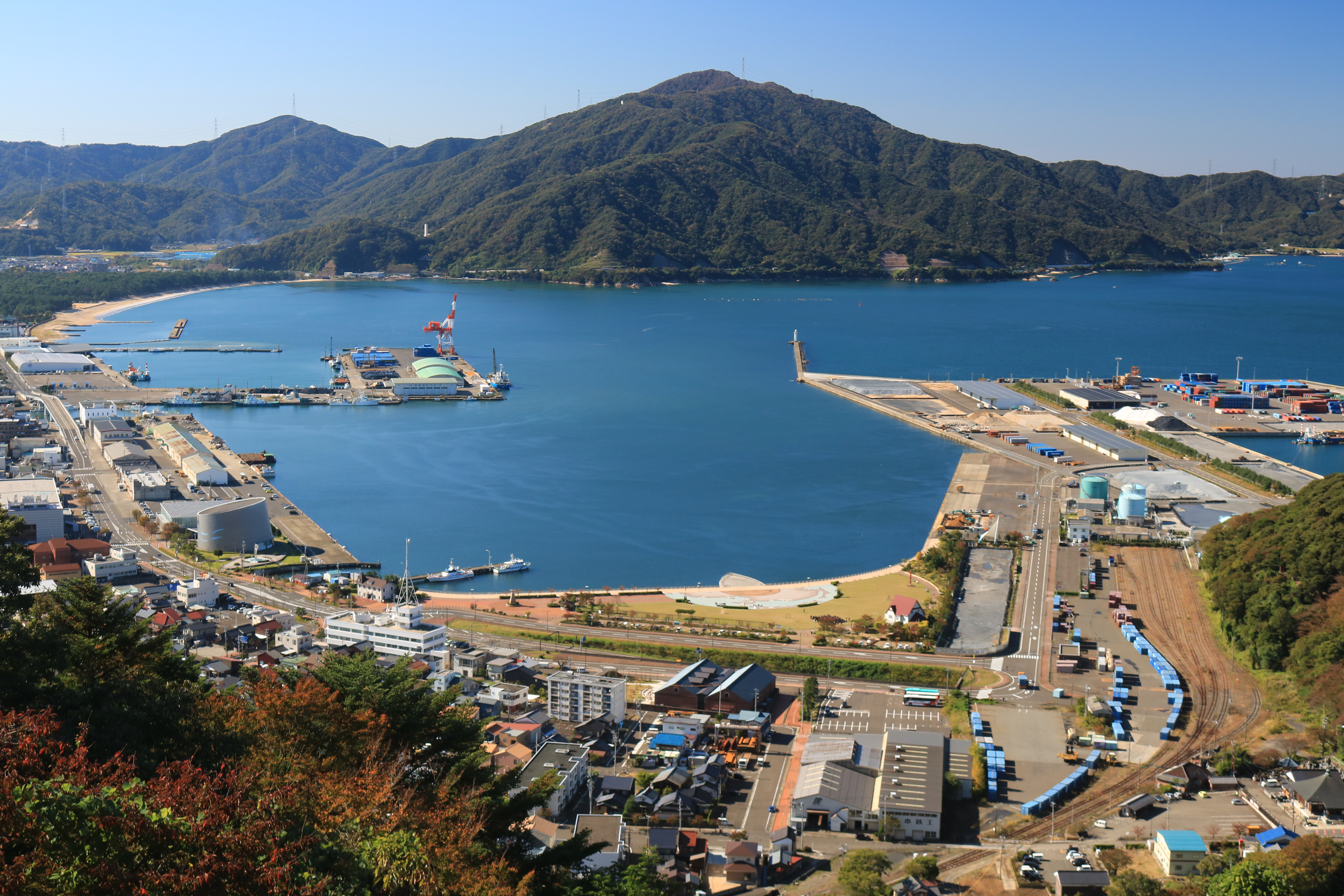
view of the port of Tsuruga

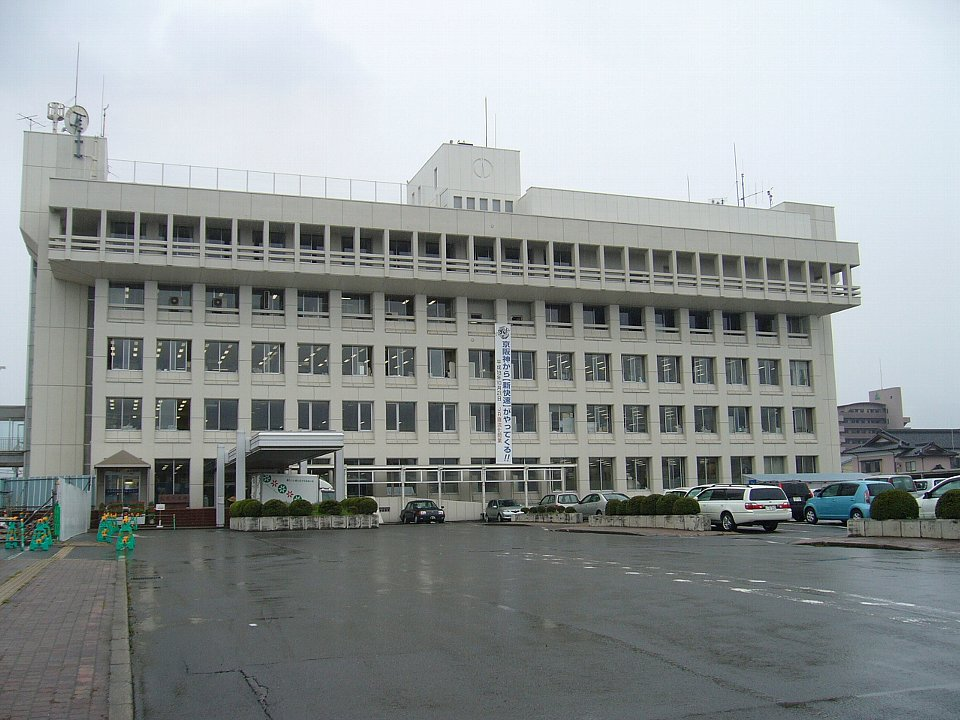
Tsuruga City Hall

Tsuruga (敦賀市, Tsuruga-shi) is a city located in Fukui Prefecture, Japan. As of June 29, 2018, the city had an estimated population of 66,123 in 28,604 households and the population density of 260 persons per km^{2}. The total area of the city was 251.39 square kilometers (97.06 sq mi).

== Geography ==
Tsuruga, looking southwest from Honmachi

Tsuruga is in central Fukui Prefecture. It faces the Sea of Japan to the north across Tsuruga Bay, an inlet of Wakasa Bay, and is surrounded by mountains on its other three sides. The city lies just north of Lake Biwa. Shiga Prefecture borders Tsuruga to the south.

The city measures about 14 km from east to west and 26 km from north to south. The Tsuruga Peninsula and 54 km (34 mi) of coastline shelter the bay from Sea of Japan winds and waves, making it a natural harbor since antiquity.

Tsuruga enjoys relatively quick access to both the Kansai region and to the Chūkyō (Nagoya) metropolitan area. By limited express train, Kyoto is 55 minutes away and Osaka about 1 hour 20 minutes. Nagoya is about 1 hour 30 minutes away by limited express. By road, Kyoto and Nagoya are each about 120 km (75 mi) away, and Osaka about 170 km (110 mi).

=== Neighboring municipalities ===
- Fukui Prefecture
  - Echizen
  - Mihama
- Shiga Prefecture
  - Nagahama
  - Takashima

=== Climate ===
Tsuruga has a humid subtropical climate (Köppen climate classification Cfa) with hot summers and cool winters. Precipitation is plentiful throughout the year, and is particularly heavy in December and January. The average annual temperature in Tsuruga is 15.6 °C (60.1 °F). The average annual rainfall is 2,199.5 mm (86.59 in) with December as the wettest month. The temperatures are highest on average in August, at around 27.7 °C (81.9 °F), and lowest in January, at around 4.7 °C (40.5 °F).

Climate data for Tsuruga (1991−2020 normals, extremes 1897−present)
Month	Jan	Feb	Mar	Apr	May	Jun	Jul	Aug	Sep	Oct	Nov	Dec	Year
Record high °C (°F)	18.9 (66.0)	20.5 (68.9)	24.8 (76.6)	30.0 (86.0)	33.2 (91.8)	36.8 (98.2)	37.6 (99.7)	37.8 (100.0)	36.8 (98.2)	31.0 (87.8)	26.1 (79.0)	21.4 (70.5)	37.8 (100.0)
Mean maximum °C (°F)	13.2 (55.8)	15.1 (59.2)	19.9 (67.8)	26.1 (79.0)	29.7 (85.5)	31.6 (88.9)	35.1 (95.2)	35.8 (96.4)	32.8 (91.0)	27.9 (82.2)	22.2 (72.0)	16.8 (62.2)	36.2 (97.2)
Mean daily maximum °C (°F)	7.8 (46.0)	8.5 (47.3)	12.3 (54.1)	17.8 (64.0)	22.5 (72.5)	25.8 (78.4)	30.0 (86.0)	31.9 (89.4)	27.7 (81.9)	22.2 (72.0)	16.5 (61.7)	10.7 (51.3)	19.5 (67.1)
Daily mean °C (°F)	4.7 (40.5)	5.1 (41.2)	8.3 (46.9)	13.4 (56.1)	18.2 (64.8)	22.1 (71.8)	26.3 (79.3)	27.7 (81.9)	23.7 (74.7)	18.1 (64.6)	12.7 (54.9)	7.4 (45.3)	15.6 (60.2)
Mean daily minimum °C (°F)	1.9 (35.4)	1.8 (35.2)	4.3 (39.7)	9.1 (48.4)	14.1 (57.4)	18.8 (65.8)	23.2 (73.8)	24.5 (76.1)	20.4 (68.7)	14.4 (57.9)	8.9 (48.0)	4.2 (39.6)	12.1 (53.8)
Mean minimum °C (°F)	−1.9 (28.6)	−1.6 (29.1)	−0.4 (31.3)	2.4 (36.3)	7.9 (46.2)	13.4 (56.1)	19.1 (66.4)	20.1 (68.2)	14.4 (57.9)	8.3 (46.9)	3.3 (37.9)	0.0 (32.0)	−2.4 (27.7)
Record low °C (°F)	−10.9 (12.4)	−10.5 (13.1)	−9.6 (14.7)	−1.7 (28.9)	2.0 (35.6)	7.9 (46.2)	13.1 (55.6)	14.1 (57.4)	8.6 (47.5)	2.7 (36.9)	−1.0 (30.2)	−6.2 (20.8)	−10.9 (12.4)
Average precipitation mm (inches)	269.5 (10.61)	164.7 (6.48)	144.6 (5.69)	120.4 (4.74)	141.4 (5.57)	144.1 (5.67)	204.0 (8.03)	146.9 (5.78)	204.9 (8.07)	152.6 (6.01)	176.0 (6.93)	316.7 (12.47)	2,199.5 (86.59)
Average snowfall cm (inches)	54 (21)	43 (17)	7 (2.8)	trace	0 (0)	0 (0)	0 (0)	0 (0)	0 (0)	0 (0)	0 (0)	19 (7.5)	126 (50)
Average precipitation days (≥ 1.0 mm)	21.8	17.3	14.4	11.6	10.7	10.7	12.2	9.3	11.3	11.7	14.1	20.7	165.8
Average snowy days (≥ 1 cm)	8.7	7.1	1.8	0.1	0	0	0	0	0	0	0	3.1	20.8
Average relative humidity (%)	73	71	67	66	68	74	75	72	74	72	71	73	71
Mean monthly sunshine hours	62.6	81.2	131.7	166.3	184.4	139.8	153.1	202.2	147.6	145.1	111.5	72.6	1,598.1
Source: Japan Meteorological Agency

== Demographics ==
Per Japanese census data, the population of Tsuruga peaked around the year 2000 and has declined slightly since.

Historical population
Year	Pop.	±%
1970	56,445	—
1980	61,844	+9.6%
1990	68,041	+10.0%
2000	68,145	+0.2%
2010	67,760	−0.6%
2020	64,264	−5.2%

== History ==
Although Tsuruga promotes itself as the leading city of the Wakasa region, the city was actually part of ancient Echizen Province. A settlement at Tsuruga is mentioned in the Nara period Kojiki and Nihon Shoki chronicles. Kanagasaki Castle was the site of major battles during the early Muromachi period and the Sengoku period, Under the Edo period Tokugawa shogunate, large portions of the city were part of the holdings of Obama Domain and Tsuruga Domain, and prospered as a major port on the kitamaebune shipping routes between western Japan and Hokkaido. Following the Meiji restoration, the area became part of Tsuruga District in the short-lived Tsuruga Prefecture, which was formed in 1871 and absorbed neighboring Asuwa Prefecture in 1873. When Tsuruga Prefecture was abolished in 1876, Tsuruga District and all of Wakasa Province were transferred to Shiga Prefecture. In 1881 they were separated from Shiga and became part of the newly created Fukui Prefecture, over the objections of Shiga's governor. With the creation of the modern municipalities system, the town of Tsuruga was founded on April 1, 1889.

An Imperial decree in July 1899 established Tsuruga as an open port for trading with the United States and the United Kingdom.

Tsuruga merged with the neighboring village of Matsubara and was incorporated as a city on April 1, 1937. Tsuruga was the only Japanese port opened to the Polish orphans in 1920, and to the Jewish refugees in 1940 thanks to Jan Zwartendijk, the Dutch Consul in Kaunas, who issued visa for Curaçao and Surinam, Mr. Chiune Sugihara, Vice-Consul for the Empire of Japan in Lithuania who issued transit visa for Japan. These events are detailed at the Port of Humanity Tsuruga Museum. On July 12, 1945, an American incendiary air raid destroyed 68 percent of Tsuruga's built-up area as part of a sustained bombing campaign against Japan's cities.

The city expanded on January 15, 1955 by annexing the neighboring villages of Arachi, Awano, Togo, Nakago and Higashiura.

== Government ==
Tsuruga has a mayor-council form of government with a directly elected mayor and a unicameral city legislature of 22 members.

== Economy ==
Tsuruga has a healthy mixed economy focused on providing services to the Wakasa region. It features a container port, a bulk terminal, a coal-fired power plant, two textile mills, a large furniture factory, a playground equipment manufacturer, and a Panasonic (Matsushita) facility. Education and energy research also drive the economy.

Tsuruga is also known for its two nuclear power facilities - the Monju demonstration nuclear plant and the Tsuruga Nuclear Power Plant.

== Education ==
Tsuruga has 13 public elementary schools and five middle schools operated by the city government, and two public high schools operated by the Fukui Prefectural Board of Education. There is also one private high school and one private middle/high school. Tsuruga Nursing University is also located in the city.

== Transportation ==
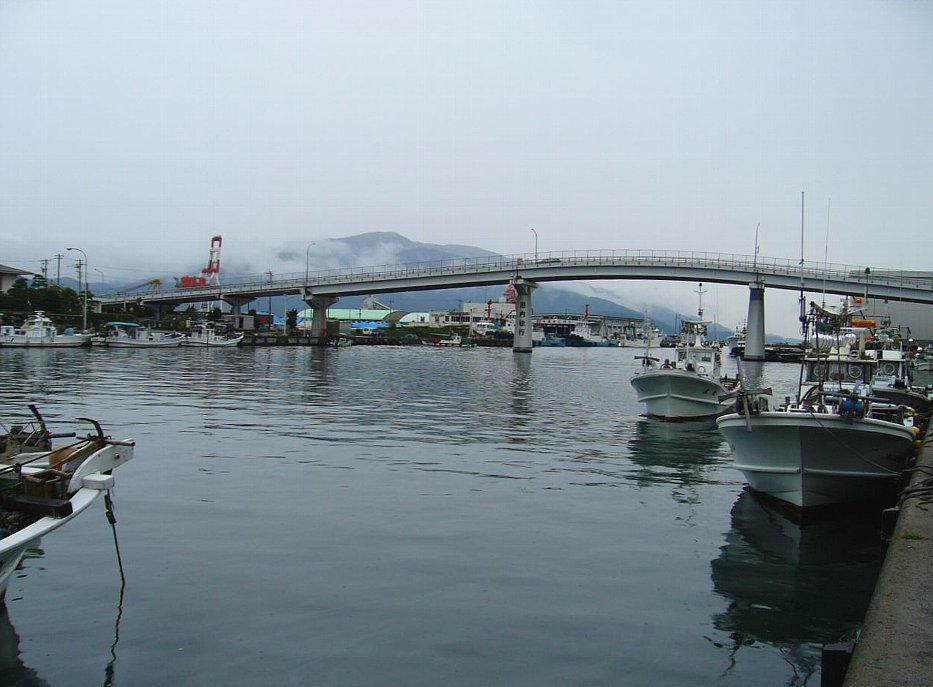
Tsuruga Port

=== Railway ===
High speed Shinkansen service to Tsuruga Station on the Hokuriku Shinkansen began on March 16, 2024.

- JR West - Hokuriku Shinkansen
  - Tsuruga
- JR West - Hokuriku Main Line (Kosei Line)
  - Tsuruga, Shin-Hikida
- JR West - Obama Line
  - Tsuruga, Nishi-Tsuruga, Awano
- Hapi-line Fukui
  - Tsuruga

=== Highway ===
- Hokuriku Expressway
- Maizuru-Wakasa Expressway
- National Route 8
- National Route 27
- National Route 161

=== Seaport ===
Fishing boats moored at the fishing port, with a bridge behind, Tsuruga

- Tsuruga Port

=== Air ===
The nearest airports are:

- Komatsu Airport, located 106 km (66 mi) north east.
- Chubu Centrair International Airport, located 117 km (73 mi) south east.

== Sister cities ==
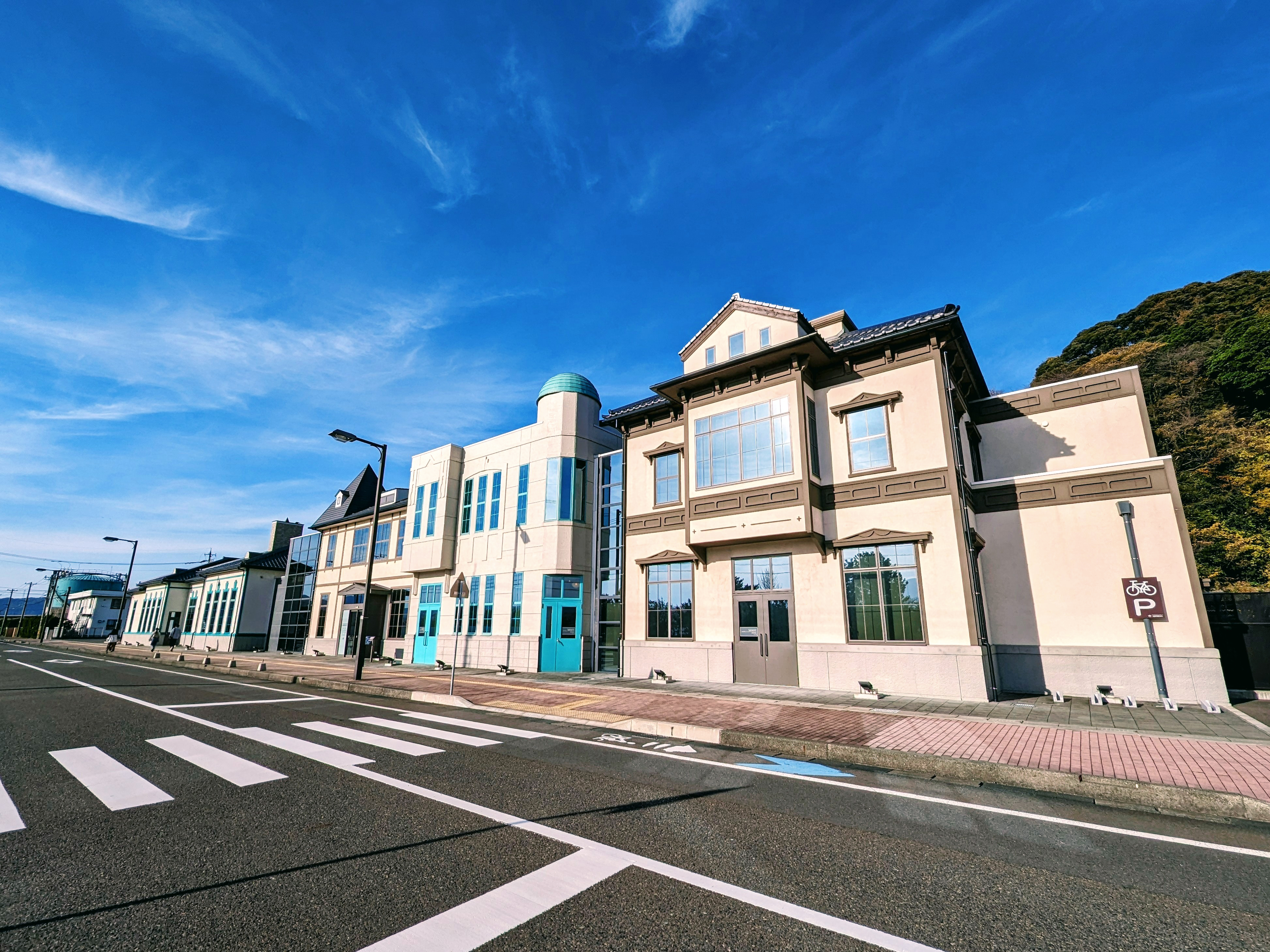
Port of Humanity Tsuruga Museum, Tsuruga, Fukui Prefecture, Japan (2023).

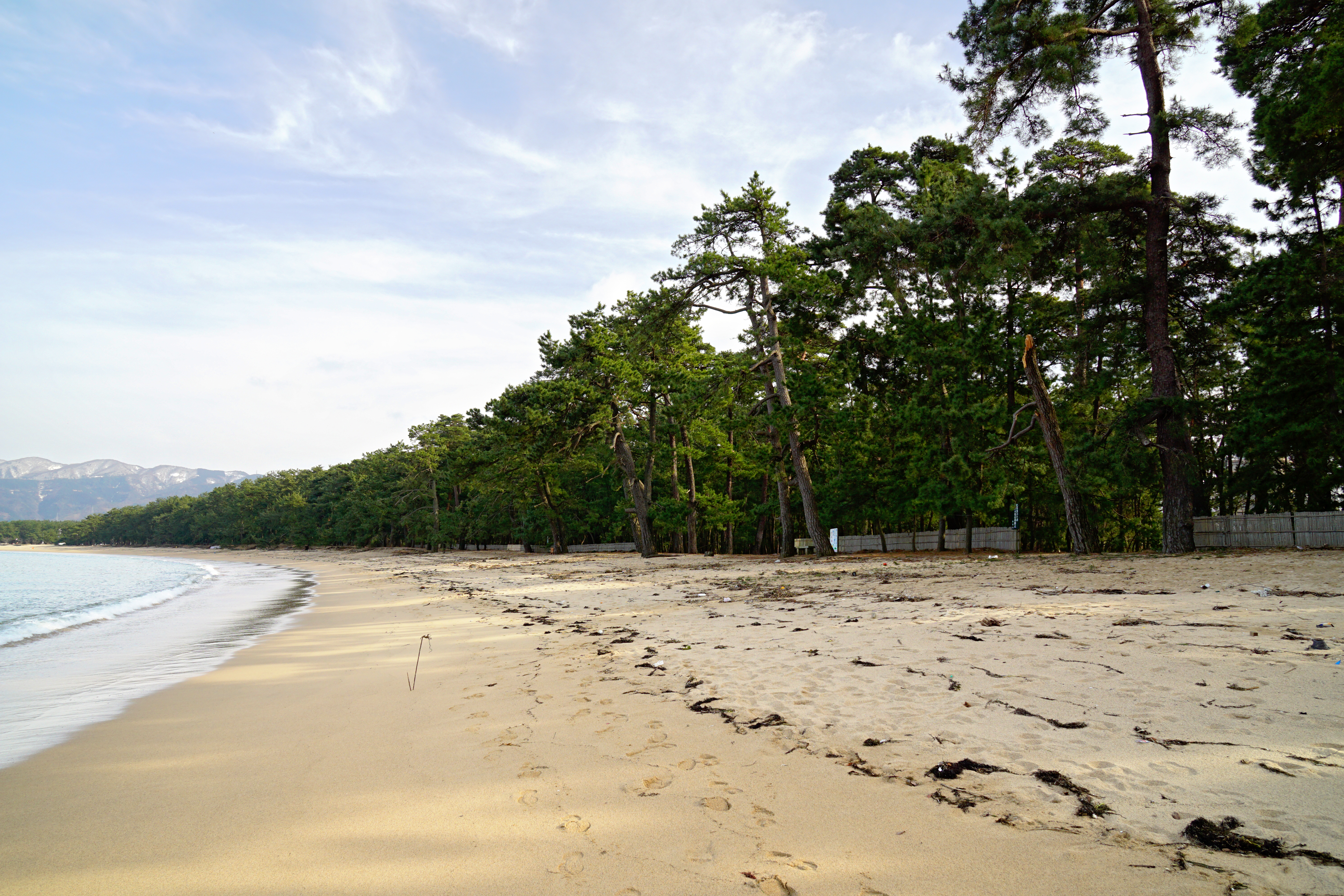
Kehi no Matsubara beach

- Donghae, South Korea, since April 13, 1981
- Nakhodka, Primorsky Krai, Russia, since October 11, 1982
- Taizhou, Zhejiang, China, since November 13, 2001

== Local attractions ==
- Grave of Takeda Kounsai, a National Historic Site
- Kanagasaki Castle site, a National Historic Site
- Kanegasaki-gū, a Shinto shrine
- Kehi Shrine, a large shrine complex built in 702. It hosts Kehi festival every year. Kehi shrine was also visited by the poet Matsuo Basho in 1689.
- Nakagō Kofun Cluster, a National Historic Site
- Port of Humanity Tsuruga Museum, local history museum dedicated to the 20th century arrivals of Polish orphans and Jewish refugees
- Tsuruga Red Brick Warehouse, Meiji-period port building
- About twenty or so bronze statues – each perhaps four or five feet tall – of characters and scenes from the popular 1970s anime Uchū Senkan Yamato (Space Battleship Yamato or, in the United States, Star Blazers) and Galaxy Express 999 were erected in the city's downtown area in 1999. Though the creator of these shows, Leiji Matsumoto, was born elsewhere, an exhibit of his artwork was held in the city in 1999 as part of the city's 100th anniversary celebration, accompanied by the erection of the statues.
