= Emperor Kōmyō =

Japanese Northern Emperor from 1336 to 1348

Emperor Kōmyō 光明天皇
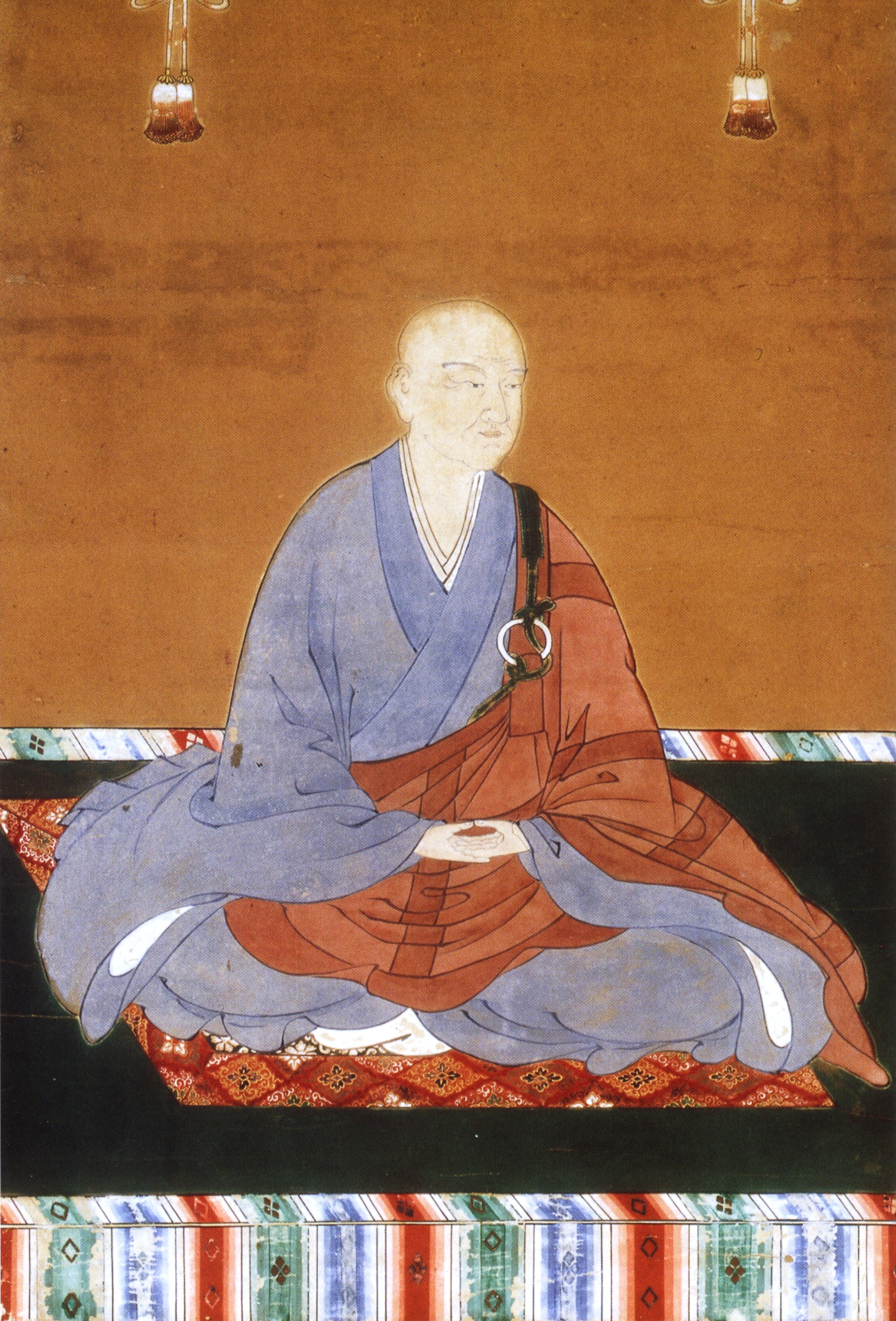

2nd Northern Emperor
- Reign: 20 September 1336 – 18 November 1348
- Enthronement: 19 January 1338
- Predecessor: Kōgon
- Successor: Sukō
- Born: 11 January 1322
- Died: 26 July 1380 (aged 58); Hase-dera
- Burial: Daikōmyō-ji no Misasagi (大光明寺)
Posthumous name
- Tsuigō: Emperor Kōmyō (光明院 or 光明天皇)
- House: Imperial House of Japan
- Father: Emperor Go-Fushimi
- Mother: Saionji (Fujiwara) Neishi

Emperor Kōmyō (光明天皇, Kōmyō Tennō) (11 January 1322 – 26 July 1380) was the second of the Emperors of Northern Court, although he was the first to be supported by the Ashikaga Bakufu. According to pre-Meiji scholars, his reign spanned the years from 1336 through 1348.

== Genealogy ==
His personal name was Yutahito (豊仁), second son of Emperor Go-Fushimi. His mother was Neishi (寧子), the daughter of Saionji Kinhira (西園寺公衡)

- Naishi: Ogimachi Sanjo Sanemi’s daughter
  - daughter: Jogakuin-dono (長照院; d.1422)
  - daughter
- Naishi: Mikawa-no-kami’s daughter
  - son: Shuson (周尊)

== Events of Kōmyō's life ==
In his own lifetime, Kōmyō and those around him believed that he occupied the Chrysanthemum Throne from 20 September 1336 to 18 November 1348.

When Ashikaga Takauji rebelled against Emperor Go-Daigo's Kenmu Restoration and entered Kyōto in 1336, Go-Daigo fled to Enryaku-ji on Mount Hiei. Despite lacking the sacred treasures, Prince Yutahito was enthroned as emperor, beginning the Northern Court. On the 12th month, 21st day, Go-Daigo escaped to Yoshino, founding the Southern Court.

On 18 November 1348, he abdicated in favor of the eldest son of his older brother, the former claimant to the throne Emperor Kōgon, who became Emperor Sukō.

In April 1352, taking advantage of the Kan'ō Disturbance, a family feud in the Ashikaga clan, the Southern Emperor Emperor Go-Murakami entered Kyoto, capturing it and carrying away Kōmyō along with Emperor Kōgon, Emperor Sukō, and the Crown Prince Tadahito. They all ended up finally in Anau, the location of the Southern Court.

In the Shōhei Reunification, Kōmyō and his companions were placed under house arrest in Yamato Province, in what is today the village of Nishiyoshino, Yoshino District, Nara. In 1355, returning to Kyōto, he entered a monastery.

- 26 July 1380 (Kōryaku 2, 24th day of the 6th month): The former emperor died at age 60.

== Eras of Kōmyō's reign ==
The years of Kōmyō's reign are more specifically identified by more than one era name or nengō.

Nanboku-chō Northern court

- Eras as reckoned by pretender Court (as determined by Meiji rescript)
- Kenmu (continued)
- Ryakuō
- Kōei
- Jōwa

Nanboku-chō Southern court

- Eras as reckoned by legitimate Court (as determined by Meiji rescript)
- Engen
- Kōkoku
- Shōhei

== Southern Court Rivals ==
- Emperor Go-Daigo
- Emperor Go-Murakami

== Notes ==
Japanese Imperial kamon — a stylized chrysanthemum blossom

== See also ==
- Emperor of Japan
- List of Emperors of Japan
- Imperial cult
- Emperor Go-Kōmyō

Regnal titles
Preceded by Emperor Kōgon	Northern Emperor; 1336–1348	Succeeded by Emperor Sukō
