= List of emperors of Japan =

Japan has been ruled by emperors since antiquity. The sequence, order and dates of the early emperors are almost entirely based on the 8th-century Nihon Shoki, which was meant to retroactively legitimise the Imperial House by dating its foundation further back to the year 660 BCE. Emperor Kinmei (r. 539–571) is often considered the first historical emperor, but the first Japanese ruler supported by historical evidence is actually Emperor Yūryaku (r. 456–479), who is mentioned in the 5th-century Inariyama and Eta Funayama Swords. According to Chinese sources, the unification of Japan took place between the 2nd and 3rd centuries.

The terms Tennō ('Emperor', 天皇), as well as Nihon ('Japan', 日本), were not adopted until the late 7th century CE. In the nengō system which has been in use since the late 7th century, years are numbered using the Japanese era name and the number of years which have elapsed since the start of that nengō era.

There have been 126 emperors of Japan since 660 BCE. The current emperor is Naruhito, since 1 May 2019.

== Emperors of Japan ==
The Honchō Kōin Shōunroku (本朝皇胤紹運録), compiled primarily during the medieval period, has traditionally been used as the primary source documenting the genealogy of successive emperors. Since the modern era, the Kōtōfu (皇統譜) has been compiled, and today, the genealogy of successive emperors is recorded and presented based on the Kōtōfu (皇統譜) maintained by the Imperial Household Agency. Here, the successive Emperors are listed based on the Kōtōfu (皇統譜).

=== Ancient Japan ===
No.	Portrait	Personal name	Posthumous name	Reign and era names (Note: Early dates vary depending on the author. These are calculated from the reign-lengths given by the Nihon Shoki (Kojiki when lacking information). Jimmu is said to have died in the 76th year of his reign, i.e. he ruled 75 years. He was 127 years old according to East Asian age reckoning, i.e. 126 in Western reckoning. Regnal years are counted using inclusive reckoning until Empress Jitō, the last reign covered by the Nihon Shoki.)	Life details
1		Hikohohodemi 彦火火出見	Emperor Jimmu 神武天皇	660–585 BCE (75 years)	721 or 711–585 BCE (126 or 136 years) Son of kami Ugayafukiaezu. Claimed descent from the sun goddess, Amaterasu. Defeated Nagasunehiko in the Eastern Expedition to become emperor. Presumed legendary.
2		Kamununakawamimi 神渟名川耳	Emperor Suizei 綏靖天皇	581–549 BCE (32 years)	632–549 BCE (83 years) Son of Emperor Jimmu. Presumed legendary.
3		Shikitsuhikotamatemi 磯城津彦玉手看	Emperor Annei 安寧天皇	549–511 BCE (37 years)	567–511 BCE (56 years) Son of Emperor Suizei. Presumed legendary.
4		Ōyamatohikosukitomo 大日本彦耜友	Emperor Itoku 懿徳天皇	510–477 BCE (33 years)	553–477 BCE (76 years) Son of Emperor Annei. Presumed legendary.
5		Mimatsuhikokaeshine 観松彦香殖稲	Emperor Kōshō 孝昭天皇	475–393 BCE (82 years)	506–393 BCE (113 years) Son of Emperor Itoku. Presumed legendary.
6		Yamatotarashihikokunioshihito 日本足彦国押人	Emperor Kōan 孝安天皇	392–291 BCE (101 years)	427–291 BCE (136 years) Son of Emperor Kōshō. Presumed legendary.
7		Ōyamatonekohikofutoni 大日本根子彦太瓊	Emperor Kōrei 孝霊天皇	290–215 BCE (75 years)	342–215 BCE (127 years) Son of Emperor Kōan. Presumed legendary.
8		Ōyamatonekohikokunikuru 大日本根子彦国牽	Emperor Kōgen 孝元天皇	214–158 BCE (56 years)	273–158 BCE (115 years) Son of Emperor Kōrei. Presumed legendary.
9		Wakayamato Nekohiko Ōbibi 稚日本根子彦大日日	Emperor Kaika 開化天皇	157–98 BCE (59 years)	208–98 BCE (110 years) Son of Emperor Kōgen. Presumed legendary.
10		Mimaki 御間城	Emperor Sujin 崇神天皇	97–30 BCE (67 years)	148–30 BCE (118 years) Son of Emperor Kaika. First emperor with a direct possibility of existence. Still presumed legendary.
11		Ikume 活目	Emperor Suinin 垂仁天皇	29 BCE–70 CE (99 years)	69 BCE–70 CE (139 years) Son of Emperor Sujin. Presumed legendary.
12		Ōtarashihiko 大足彦	Emperor Keikō 景行天皇	71–130 (59 years)	13 BCE–130 CE (143 years) Son of Emperor Suinin. Presumed legendary.
13		Wakatarashihiko 稚足彦	Emperor Seimu 成務天皇	131–190 (59 years)	84–190 (106 years) Son of Emperor Keikō. Presumed legendary.
14		Tarashinakatsuhiko 足仲彦	Emperor Chūai 仲哀天皇	192–200 (8 years)	149–200 (51 years) Grandson of Emperor Keikō; nephew of Seimu. First emperor to ascend the throne without being the son of the previous emperor. Died during a campaign against the Kumaso tribe. Presumed legendary.
15		Homutawake 誉田別	Emperor Ōjin 応神天皇	270–310 (40 years)	201–310 (109 years) Son of Emperor Chūai and Empress Jingū. Deified in Shinto and Buddhism in Japan as Hachiman. Likely a historical ruler that lived much later.
16		Ohosazaki 大鷦鷯	Emperor Nintoku 仁徳天皇	313–399 (86 years)	290–399 (108–109 years) Son of Emperor Ōjin. Presumed legendary.
17		Ōenoizahowake 大兄去来穂別	Emperor Richū 履中天皇	400–405 (5 years)	336–405 (69 years) Son of Emperor Nintoku. Presumed legendary.
18		Mizuhawake 瑞歯別	Emperor Hanzei 反正天皇	406–411 (5 years)	352–411 (59 years) Son of Emperor Nintoku; younger brother of Emperor Richū. Presumed legendary.
19		Oasatsuma Wakugo no Sukune 雄朝津間稚子宿禰	Emperor Ingyō 允恭天皇	411–453 (42 years)	376–453 (77 years) Son of Emperor Nintoku; younger brother of Emperor Richū and Emperor Hanzei. Presumed legendary.
20		Anaho 穴穂	Emperor Ankō 安康天皇	453–456 (3 years)	401–456 (55 years) Son of Emperor Ingyō. Assassinated by Prince Mayowa. Presumed legendary.
21		Ōhatuse no Wakatakeru 大泊瀬稚武	Emperor Yūryaku 雄略天皇; Ōhatuse no Wakatakeru no Sumera-mikoto 大泊瀬幼武尊天皇	456–479 (23 years)	418–479 (61 years) Son of Emperor Ingyō; younger brother of Ankō. First historical emperor. (Note: Emperor Yūryaku's existence is attested in the Inariyama and Eta Funayama Swords, both made during reign of "the Great king Waka Takiru" (Wakatakeru). The first sword is dated to the "Year of the Metal Pig", which could mean 471 or 534. Historian Donald F. McCallum argues that Yūryaku's four direct successors are not historical figures given that almost nothing is known about them.)
22		Shiraka 白髪	Emperor Seinei 清寧天皇	480–484 (4 years)	444–484 (40 years) Son of Emperor Yūryaku. Presumed legendary.
23		Woke 弘計	Emperor Kenzō 顕宗天皇	485–487 (2 years)	450–487 (37 years) Grandson of Emperor Richū; cousin and adopted son of Emperor Seinei. Presumed legendary.
24		Oke 億計	Emperor Ninken 仁賢天皇	488–498 (10 years)	448–498 (50 years) Grandson of Emperor Richū; cousin and adopted son of Emperor Seinei; older brother of Emperor Kenzō. Presumed legendary.
25		Ohatsuse no Wakasazaki 小泊瀬稚鷦鷯	Emperor Buretsu 武烈天皇	499–506 (7 years)	489–506 (17 years) Son of Emperor Ninken. Presumed legendary.
26		Ohodo (Note: Also called as Hikofuto (彦太).) 袁本杼	Emperor Keitai 継体天皇; Ohodo no Sumera-mikoto (雄大迹天皇)	3 March 507 – 10 March 531 (24 years)	450 – 10 March 531 (81 years) 5th-generation grandson of Emperor Ōjin. Became emperor at the recommendation of Ōtomo no Kanamura. Possible founder of a new dynasty.
27		Magari 勾	Emperor Ankan 安閑天皇; Hirokuni-oshitakekanahi no Sumera-mikoto (広国押武金日天皇)	c. 10 March 531 – 25 January 536 (4 years)	466 – 25 January 536 (69 years) Son of Emperor Keitai. Presumed legendary.
28		Hinokuma-no-takata 檜隈高田	Emperor Senka 宣化天皇; Takewohirokunioshitate no Sumera-mikoto (武小広国押盾天皇)	25 January 536 – 15 March 539 (3 years)	466 – 15 March 539 (73 years) Son of Emperor Keitai; younger brother of Emperor Ankan. Presumed legendary.

=== Classical Japan (538–1185) ===
==== Asuka period (538–710) ====
No.	Portrait	Personal name	Posthumous name	Reign and era names	Life details
29		Amekunioshiharakihironiwa 天国排開広庭	Emperor Kinmei 欽明天皇; Amekuni-oshiharaki-hironiwa no Sumera-mikoto 天国排開広庭天皇	540–571 (31 years)	509–571 (62 years) Son of Emperor Keitai; younger brother of Ankan and Senka. Often considered the first historically verifiable emperor.
30		Nunakura no Futotamashiki 渟中倉太珠敷	Emperor Bidatsu 敏達天皇; Nunakura no Futotamashiki no Sumera-mikoto 渟中倉太珠敷天皇	572–585 (13 years)	538–585 (47 years) Son of Emperor Kinmei.
31		Tachibana no Toyohi 橘豊日	Emperor Yōmei 用明天皇; Tachibana no Toyohi no Sumera-mikoto 橘豊日天皇	586–587 (1 year)	517–587 (70 years) Son of Emperor Kinmei; half-brother of Emperor Bidatsu.
32		Hatsusebe 泊瀬部	Emperor Sushun 崇峻天皇; Hatsune Benowa Kasasagi no Sumera-mikoto 長谷部若雀天皇	587–592 (5 years)	522–592 (70 years) Son of Emperor Kinmei; half-brother of Emperor Bidatsu and Emperor Yōmei. Made emperor by Soga no Umako following the Soga–Mononobe conflict. Assassinated by Yamatonoaya no Koma on the orders of Soga no Umako.
33		Nukatabe 額田部	Empress Suiko 推古天皇; Toyomikekashikiya-hime no Sumera-mikoto 豊御食炊屋姫天皇	593–628 (35 years)	554–628 (74 years) Daughter of Emperor Kinmei; half-sister and wife of Emperor Bidatsu. First non-legendary female monarch. Prince Shōtoku acted as her regent.
34		Tamura 田村	Emperor Jomei 舒明天皇; Okinagatarashihihironuka no Sumera-mikoto 息長足日広額天皇	629–641 (12 years)	593–641 (48 years) Grandson of Emperor Bidatsu; great nephew of Empress Suiko.
35		Takara 宝	Empress Kōgyoku 皇極天皇; Ametoyotakaraikashihitarashi-hime no Sumera-mikoto 天豊財重日足姫天皇	642–645 (3 years)	594–661 (67 years) Great-granddaughter of Emperor Bidatsu; wife of Emperor Jomei. First reign. Abdicated as a result of the Isshi incident.
36		Karu 軽	Emperor Kōtoku 孝徳天皇; Ameyorozutoyohi no Sumera-mikoto 天万豊日天皇	645–654 (9 years) Taika, Hakuchi	597–654 (57 years) Great-grandson of Emperor Bidatsu; younger brother of Empress Kōgyoku. First era name assigned.
37		Takara 宝	Empress Saimei 斉明天皇; Ametoyotakaraikashihitarashi-hime no Sumera-mikoto 天豊財重日足姫天皇	655–661 (6 years)	594–661 (67 years) Older sister of Emperor Kōtoku. Previously reigned as Empress Kōgyoku. Second reign.
38		Kazuraki 葛城	Emperor Tenji 天智天皇; Amenokotohirakasuwake no Sumera-mikoto 天命開別天皇	662–672 (10 years)	626–672 (46 years) Son of Emperor Jomei and Empress Kōgyoku.
39		Ōtomo (Note: Also known as Iga (伊賀).) 大友	Emperor Kōbun 弘文天皇	672 (8 months)	648–672 (24 years) Son of Emperor Tenji. Deposed and committed suicide during the Jinshin War. Since 1870, he has been counted among the successive emperors, and was given a posthumous name that year. Based on the Honchō Kōin Shōunroku (本朝皇胤紹運録), he is not included among the successive emperors and is recorded as "Prince Ōtomo" (Ōtomo no Ōji or Ōtomo no Miko, 大友皇子).
40		Ōama 大海人	Emperor Tenmu 天武天皇; Amanonunaharaokinomahito no Sumera-mikoto 天渟中原瀛真人天皇	673–686 (14 years) Shuchō	630–686 (56 years) Son of Emperor Jomei and Empress Kōgyoku; younger brother of Emperor Tenji. Deposed his nephew, Emperor Kōbun, during the Jinshin War.
41		Unonosarara (Note: Also known as Unonosasara or Uno.) 鸕野讚良	Empress Jitō 持統天皇; Takamanoharahiro no hime no Sumera-mikoto 高天原広野姫天皇	687–697 (10 years) (Note: Her dates are usually given as 686–697. However, the Nihon Shoki states that she died on her 11th year, i.e. she ruled 10 years.)	646–703 (57 years) Daughter of Emperor Tenji; niece and wife of Emperor Tenmu. Abdicated.
42		Karu (Note: Name also written as 軽.) 珂瑠	Emperor Monmu 文武天皇; Yamato-neko-toyoohoji no Sumera-mikoto 倭根子豊祖父天皇; Ame no Mamune-toyoohoji no Sumera-mikoto 天之真宗豊祖父天皇	697–707 (10 years) Taihō, Keiun	683–707 (24 years) Grandson of Emperor Tenmu and Empress Jitō.

==== Nara period (710–794) ====
No.	Portrait	Personal name	Posthumous name	Reign and era names	Life details
43		Ahe (Note: Name also written as 阿部.) 阿閇	Empress Genmei 元明天皇; Yamato-neko-amatsumiyo-toyokuni-narihime no Sumera-mikoto 日本根子天津御代豊国成姫天皇	707–715 (8 years) Keiun, Wadō	660–721 (61 years) Daughter of Emperor Tenji; half-sister of Empress Jitō; mother of Emperor Monmu. Abdicated.
44		Hidaka (Note: Name also written as 日高.) 氷高	Empress Genshō 元正天皇; Yamato-neko-takamizukiyotarashihime no Sumera-mikoto 日本根子高瑞浄足姫天皇	715–724 (9 years) Reiki, Yōrō	681–748 (67 years) Daughter of Empress Genmei; elder sister of Emperor Monmu. Only instance of an empress regnant inheriting the throne from another empress regnant. Abdicated.
45		Obito 首	Emperor Shōmu 聖武天皇; Emperor Shōhō-kanjin-shōmu 勝宝感神聖武皇帝; Ameshirushikunioshiharakitoyosakurahiko no Sumera-mikoto 天璽国押開豊桜彦天皇	724–749 (25 years) Jinki, Tenpyō, Tenpyō-kanpō	701–756 (55 years) Son of Emperor Monmu; nephew of Empress Genshō. Abdicated.
46		Abe 阿倍	Empress Kōken 孝謙天皇; Takano no hime no Sumera-mikoto 高野姫天皇	749–758 (9 years) Tenpyō-kanpō, Tenpyō-shōhō, Tenpyō-hōji	718–770 (52 years) Daughter of Emperor Shōmu. First reign. Abdicated.
47		Ōi 大炊	Emperor Junnin 淳仁天皇	758–764 (6 years) Tenpyō-hōji	733–765 (32 years) Grandson of Emperor Tenmu; cousin of Empress Kōken. Deposed. He was given a posthumous name in 1870. Based on the Honchō Kōin Shōunroku (本朝皇胤紹運録), he is recorded as "Awaji Dethroned Emperor" (Awaji Haitei, 淡路廃帝), yet he is included among the successive emperors.
48		Abe 阿倍	Empress Shōtoku 称徳天皇; Takano no hime no Sumera-mikoto 高野姫天皇	764–770 (6 years) Tenpyō-hōji, Tenpyō-jingo, Jingo-keiun	718–770 (52 years) Deposed her cousin, Emperor Junnin. Previously reigned as Empress Kōken. Second reign.
49		Shirakabe 白壁	Emperor Kōnin 光仁天皇; Ametsumune-takatsugi no Sumera-mikoto 天宗高紹天皇	770–781 (11 years) Hōki, Ten'ō	708–782 (73 years) Grandson of Emperor Tenji; brother-in-law of Empress Shōtoku. Abdicated.

==== Heian period (794–1185) ====
No.	Portrait	Personal name	Posthumous name	Reign and era names	Life details
50		Yamabe 山部	Emperor Kanmu 桓武天皇; Yamato-neko-amatsu Hitsugi-yateri no Sumera-mikoto 日本根子皇統弥照天皇	781–806 (25 years) Ten'ō, Enryaku	736–806 (70 years) Son of Emperor Kōnin.
51		Ate 安殿	Emperor Heizei 平城天皇; Yamato-neko-ameoshikuni-takahiko no Sumera-mikoto 日本根子皇統弥照天皇	806–809 (3 years) Daidō	773–824 (51 years) Son of Emperor Kanmu. Abdicated.
52		Kamino 神野	Emperor Saga 嵯峨天皇	809–823 (14 years) Daidō, Kōnin	785–842 (57 years) Son of Emperor Kanmu; younger brother of Emperor Heizei. Abdicated.
53		Ōtomo 大伴	Emperor Junna 淳和天皇; Yamato-neko-ame no Takazuruiyatoo no Sumera-mikoto 日本根子天高譲弥遠尊天皇	823–833 (10 years) Kōnin, Tenchō	786–840 (54 years) Son of Emperor Kanmu; younger brother of Emperor Heizei and Emperor Saga. Abdicated.
54		Masara 正良	Emperor Ninmyō 仁明天皇; Yamato-neko-atsume Shirushi-toyosato no Sumera-mikoto 日本根子天璽豊聡慧尊天皇	833–850 (17 years) Tenchō, Jōwa, Kashō	808–850 (41 years) Son of Emperor Saga; nephew and adopted son of Emperor Junna.
55		Michiyasu 道康	Emperor Montoku 文徳天皇	850–858 (8 years) Kashō, Ninju, Saikō, Ten'an	827–858 (31 years) Son of Emperor Ninmyō.
56		Korehito 惟仁	Emperor Seiwa 清和天皇	858–876 (18 years) Ten'an, Jōgan	850–881 (30 years) Son of Emperor Montoku. Abdicated.
57		Sadaakira 貞明	Emperor Yōzei 陽成天皇	876–884 (8 years) Jōgan, Gangyō	869–949 (80 years) Son of Emperor Seiwa. Deposed by Fujiwara no Mototsune.
58		Tokiyasu 時康	Emperor Kōkō 光孝天皇	884–887 (3 years) Gangyō, Ninna	830–887 (57 years) Son of Emperor Ninmyō; great uncle of Emperor Yōzei. Became emperor at the recommendation of Fujiwara no Mototsune.
59		Sadami 定省	Emperor Uda 宇多天皇	887–897 (10 years) Ninna, Kanpyō	866–931 (65 years) Son of Emperor Kōkō. Abdicated.
60		Atsuhito (Note: Previously named Minamoto no Korezane (源維城).) 敦仁	Emperor Daigo 醍醐天皇	897–930 (33 years) Kanpyō, Shōtai, Engi, Enchō	884–930 (46 years) Son of Emperor Uda. Abdicated.
61		Yutaakira (Note: Also known as Hiroakira.) 寛明	Emperor Suzaku 朱雀天皇	930–946 (16 years) Enchō, Jōhei, Tengyō	921–952 (30 years) Son of Emperor Daigo. Abdicated.
62		Nariakira 成明	Emperor Murakami 村上天皇	946–967 (21 years) Tengyō, Tenryaku, Tentoku, Ōwa, Kōhō	924–967 (42 years) Son of Emperor Daigo; younger brother of Emperor Suzaku.
63		Norihara 憲平	Emperor Reizei 冷泉天皇	967–969 (2 years) Kōhō, Anna	949–1011 (62 years) Son of Emperor Murakami. Abdicated.
64		Morihira 守平	Emperor En'yū 円融天皇	969–984 (15 years) Anna, Tenroku, Ten'en, Jōgen, Tengen, Eikan	958–991 (32 years) Son of Emperor Murakami; younger brother of Emperor Reizei. Abdicated.
65		Morosada 師貞	Emperor Kazan 花山天皇	984–986 (2 years) Eikan, Kanna	968–1008 (39 years) Son of Emperor Reizei; nephew of Emperor En'yū. Abdicated.
66		Kanehito 懐仁	Emperor Ichijō 一条天皇	986–1011 (25 years) Kanna, Eien, Eiso, Shōryaku, Chōtoku, Chōhō, Kankō	980–1011 (31 years) Son of Emperor En'yū. Abdicated.
67		Okisada (Note: Also known as Iyasada or Sukesada.) 居貞	Emperor Sanjō 三条天皇	1011–1016 (5 years) Kankō, Chōwa	975–1017 (42 years) Son of Emperor Reizei; half-brother of Emperor Kazan; cousin of Emperor Ichijō. Abdicated.
68		Atsuhira (Note: Also known as Atsunari.) 敦成	Emperor Go-Ichijō 後一条天皇	1016–1036 (20 years) Chōwa, Kannin, Jian, Manju, Chōgen	1008–1036 (27 years) Son of Emperor Ichijō; cousin of Emperor Sanjō.
69		Atsunaga 敦良	Emperor Go-Suzaku 後朱雀天皇	1036–1045 (9 years) Chōgen, Chōryaku, Chōkyū, Kantoku	1009–1045 (37 years) Son of Emperor Ichijō; younger brother of Emperor Go-Ichijō. Abdicated.
70		Chikahito 親仁	Emperor Go-Reizei 後冷泉天皇	1045–1068 (23 years) Kantoku, Eishō, Tengi, Kōhei, Jiryaku	1025–1068 (42 years) Son of Emperor Go-Suzaku.
71		Takahito 尊仁	Emperor Go-Sanjō 後三条天皇	1068–1073 (5 years) Jiryaku, Enkyū	1032–1073 (40 years) Son of Emperor Go-Suzaku; half-brother of Emperor Go-Reizei. Abdicated.
72		Sadahito 貞仁	Emperor Shirakawa 白河天皇	1073–1087 (14 years) Enkyū, Jōhō, Jōryaku, Eihō, Ōtoku	1053–1129 (76 years) Son of Emperor Go-Sanjō. Abdicated.
73		Taruhito (Note: Also known as Yoshihito.) 善仁	Emperor Horikawa 堀河天皇	1087–1107 (20 years) Kanji, Kahō, Eichō, Jōtoku, Kōwa, Chōji, Kajō	1079–1107 (28 years) Son of Emperor Shirakawa.
74		Munehito 宗仁	Emperor Toba 鳥羽天皇	1107–1123 (16 years) Kajō, Tennin, Ten'ei, Eikyū, Gen'ei, Hōan	1103–1156 (53 years) Son of Emperor Horikawa. Forced to abdicate by Emperor Shirakawa.
75		Akihito 顕仁	Emperor Sutoku 崇徳天皇	1123–1142 (19 years) Hōan, Tenji, Daiji, Tenshō, Chōshō, Hōen, Eiji	1119–1164 (45 years) Son of Emperor Toba. Abdicated. Attempted to depose Emperor Go-Shirakawa during the Hōgen rebellion.
76		Narihito 体仁	Emperor Konoe 近衛天皇	1142–1155 (13 years) Eiji, Kōji, Ten'yō, Kyūan, Ninpei, Kyūju	1139–1155 (16 years) Son of Emperor Toba; half-brother of Emperor Sutoku.
77		Masahito 雅仁	Emperor Go-Shirakawa 後白河天皇	1155–1158 (3 years) Kyūju, Hōgen	1127–1192 (64 years) Son of Emperor Toba; younger brother of Emperor Sutoku; half-brother of Emperor Konoe. Abdicated.
78		Morihito 守仁	Emperor Nijō 二条天皇	1158–1165 (7 years) Hōgen, Heiji, Eiryaku, Ōhō, Chōkan	1143–1165 (22 years) Son of Emperor Go-Shirakawa. Abdicated.
79		Nobuhito (Note: Also known as Yoshihito or Toshihito.) 順仁	Emperor Rokujō 六条天皇	1165–1168 (3 years) Chōkan, Eiman, Nin'an	1164–1176 (11 years) Son of Emperor Nijō. Deposed by Emperor Go-Shirakawa.
80		Norihito (Note: Also known as Nobuhito.) 憲仁	Emperor Takakura 高倉天皇	1168–1180 (12 years) Nin'an, Kaō, Jōan, Angen, Jishō	1161–1181 (19 years) Son of Emperor Go-Shirakawa; half-brother of Emperor Nijō; uncle of Emperor Rokujō. Forced to abdicate by Taira no Kiyomori.
81		Tokihito (Note: Also known as Kotohito.) 言仁	Emperor Antoku 安徳天皇	18 March 1180 – 25 April 1185 (5 years, 38 days) Jishō, Yōwa, Juei, Genryaku	22 December 1178 – 25 April 1185 (6 years) Son of Emperor Takakura. Died at the Battle of Dan-no-ura during the Genpei War.

=== Medieval Japan (1185–1603) ===
==== Kamakura period (1185–1333) ====
No.	Portrait	Personal name	Posthumous name	Reign and era names	Life details
82		Takahira (Note: Also known as Takanari.) 尊成	Emperor Go-Toba 後鳥羽天皇	8 September 1183 – 18 February 1198 (14 years, 163 days) Juei, Genryaku, Bunji, Kenkyū	6 August 1180 – 28 March 1239 (58 years) Son of Emperor Takakura; half-brother of Emperor Antoku. Made emperor by Emperor Go-Shirakawa during the Genpei War. Kamakura shogunate turned the emperor into a figurehead. Abdicated. Attempted to overthrow the Kamakura shogunate during the Jōkyū War.
83		Tamehito 為仁	Emperor Tsuchimikado 土御門天皇	18 February 1198 – 12 December 1210 (12 years, 297 days) Kenkyū, Shōji, Kennin, Genkyū, Ken'ei, Jōgen	3 January 1196 – 6 November 1231 (35 years) Son of Emperor Go-Toba. Persuaded by Emperor Go-Toba to abdicate. Exiled following the Jōkyū War.
84		Morinari 守成	Emperor Juntoku 順徳天皇	12 December 1210 – 12 May 1221 (10 years, 151 days) Jōgen, Kenryaku, Kempo, Jōkyū	22 October 1197 – 7 October 1242 (44 years) Son of Emperor Go-Toba; half-brother of Emperor Tsuchimikado. Forced to abdicate following the Jōkyū War.
85		Kanenari 懐成	Emperor Chūkyō 仲恭天皇	12 May 1221 – 29 July 1221 (78 days) Jōkyū	30 October 1218 – 18 June 1234 (15 years) Son of Emperor Juntoku. Deposed and exiled following the Jōkyū War. Since 1870, he has been counted among the successive emperors, and was given a posthumous name that year. Based on the Honchō Kōin Shōunroku (本朝皇胤紹運録), he is not included among the successive emperors and is recorded as "Kujō Dethroned Emperor" (Kujō Haitei, 九条廃帝).
86		Yutahito (Note: Also known as Motsihito.) 茂仁	Emperor Go-Horikawa 後堀河天皇	29 July 1221 – 17 November 1232 (11 years, 111 days) Jōkyū, Jōō, Gennin, Karoku, Antei, Kangi, Jōei	22 March 1212 – 31 August 1234 (22 years) Grandson of Emperor Takakura; first cousin of Emperor Chūkyō. Abdicated. Based on the Honchō Kōin Shōunroku (本朝皇胤紹運録), he is the 85th Emperor.
87		Mitsuhito (Note: Also known as Tosihito.) 秀仁	Emperor Shijō 四条天皇	17 November 1232 – 10 February 1242 (9 years, 85 days) Jōei, Tenpuku, Bunryaku, Katei, Ryakunin, En'ō, Ninji	17 March 1231 – 10 February 1242 (10 years) Son of Emperor Go-Horikawa. Based on the Honchō Kōin Shōunroku (本朝皇胤紹運録), he is the 86th Emperor.
88		Kunihito 邦仁	Emperor Go-Saga 後嵯峨天皇	21 February 1242 – 16 February 1246 (3 years, 360 days) Ninji, Kangen	1 April 1220 – 17 March 1272 (51 years) Son of Emperor Tsuchimikado; second cousin of Emperor Shijō. Abdicated. Based on the Honchō Kōin Shōunroku (本朝皇胤紹運録), he is the 87th Emperor.
89		Hisahito 久仁	Emperor Go-Fukakusa (Note: Also known as Emperor Go-Ninmyō.) 後深草天皇	1246–1260 (14 years) Kangen, Hōji, Kenchō, Kōgen, Shōka, Shōgen	1243–1304 (61 years) Son of Emperor Go-Saga. From the Jimyōin line. Abdicated at the insistence of Emperor Go-Saga. Based on the Honchō Kōin Shōunroku (本朝皇胤紹運録), he is the 88th Emperor.
90		Tsunehito 恒仁	Emperor Kameyama 亀山天皇	1260–1274 (14 years) Shōgen, Bun'ō, Kōchō, Bun'ei	1249–1305 (56 years) Son of Emperor Go-Saga; younger brother of Emperor Go-Fukakusa. From the Daikakuji line. Abdicated. Based on the Honchō Kōin Shōunroku (本朝皇胤紹運録), he is the 89th Emperor.
91		Yohito 世仁	Emperor Go-Uda 後宇多天皇	1274–1287 (13 years) Bun'ei, Kenji, Kōan	1267–1324 (56 years) Son of Emperor Kameyama. From the Daikakuji line. Forced to abdicate by Emperor Go-Fukakusa. Based on the Honchō Kōin Shōunroku (本朝皇胤紹運録), he is the 90th Emperor.
92		Hirohito 熈仁	Emperor Fushimi 伏見天皇	1287–1298 (11 years) Kōan, Shōō, Einin	1265–1317 (52 years) Son of Emperor Go-Fukakusa. From the Jimyōin line. Abdicated. Based on the Honchō Kōin Shōunroku (本朝皇胤紹運録), he is the 91st Emperor.
93		Tanehito 胤仁	Emperor Go-Fushimi 後伏見天皇	1298–1301 (3 years) Einin, Shōan	1288–1336 (48 years) Son of Emperor Fushimi. From the Jimyōin line. Forced to abdicate by the Daikakuji line. Traditional dates used. Based on the Honchō Kōin Shōunroku (本朝皇胤紹運録), he is the 92nd Emperor.
94		Kuniharu 邦治	Emperor Go-Nijō 後二条天皇	1301–1308 (7 years) Shōan, Kengen, Kagen, Tokuji	1285–1308 (23 years) Son of Emperor Go-Uda. From the Daikakuji line. Based on the Honchō Kōin Shōunroku (本朝皇胤紹運録), he is the 93rd Emperor.
95		Tomihito 富仁	Emperor Hanazono 花園天皇	1308–1318 (10 years) Enkyō, Ōchō, Shōwa, Bunpō	1297–1348 (51 years) Son of Emperor Fushimi. From the Jimyōin line. Agreed to alternate control of the throne between the Daikakuji and Jimyōin lines. Based on the Honchō Kōin Shōunroku (本朝皇胤紹運録), he is the 94th Emperor.

==== 1336–1600 period ====
Courts period (1336–1392) / Muromachi period (1336–1573) / Azuchi–Momoyama period (1568–1600)

No.	Portrait	Personal name	Posthumous name	Reign and era names	Life details
96		Takaharu 尊治	Emperor Go-Daigo 後醍醐天皇	1318–1339 (21 years) Bunpō, Gen'ō, Genkō (1321–24), Shōchū, Karyaku, Gentoku, Genkō (1331–34), Kenmu, Engen	1288–1339 (50 years) Son of Emperor Go-Uda; younger brother of Emperor Go-Nijō. From the Daikakuji line. Kamakura shogunate ended in the Genkō War. Brief imperial rule during the Kenmu Restoration. Opposed the Ashikaga shogunate. Became the first emperor of the Southern Court. Based on the Honchō Kōin Shōunroku (本朝皇胤紹運録), which regards the "Northern Court" as the legitimate line, his reign is recorded as spanning the periods from 1318 to 1331 and from 1333 to 1336. Furthermore, based on that document, he is the 95th Emperor.
97		Noriyoshi (Note: Also known as Norinaga.) 義良	Emperor Go-Murakami 後村上天皇	1339–1368 (29 years) Engen, Kōkoku, Shōhei	1328–1368 (40 years) Son of Emperor Go-Daigo. Second emperor of the Southern Court. Southern Court briefly took the Northern Court's capital, Kyoto, during the Kannō disturbance. Based on the Honchō Kōin Shōunroku (本朝皇胤紹運録), which regards the Northern Court as the legitimate line, he is not included among the successive emperors and is recorded as "Prince Noriyoshi" (Noriyoshi Shinnō, 義良親王). Furthermore, a note next to his name states, "he was given the title of Emperor Go-Murakami as claimed by the Southern Court.". Because the Southern Court was recognized as the legitimate imperial line in 1911, he has been counted among the successive emperors ever since.
98		Yutanari 寛成	Emperor Chōkei 長慶天皇	1368–1383 (15 years) Shōhei, Kentoku, Bunchū, Tenju, Kōwa	1343–1394 (51 years) Son of Emperor Go-Murakami. Third emperor of the Southern Court. Abdicated. Based on the Honchō Kōin Shōunroku (本朝皇胤紹運録), which regards the "Northern Court" as the legitimate line, he is not included among the successive emperors and is recorded as "Prince Yutanari" (Yutanari Shinnō, 寛成親王). Furthermore, a note next to his name states, "he was given the title of Emperor Chōkei as claimed by the Southern Court.". The Southern Court was recognized as the legitimate imperial line in 1911, but he was not recognized as an emperor until 1925. Since then, he has been counted among the successive emperors.
99		Hironari 熙成	Emperor Go-Kameyama 後亀山天皇	1383–1392 (9 years) Kōwa, Genchū	c. 1347–1424 (c. 77 years) Son of Emperor Go-Murakami; younger brother of Emperor Chōkei. Fourth and last emperor of the Southern Court. Agreed to peace with the Northern Court. Abdicated in favor of the Northern Court line. Based on the Honchō Kōin Shōunroku (本朝皇胤紹運録), which regards the "Northern Court" as the legitimate line, he is not included among the successive emperors and is recorded as "Prince Hironari" (Hironari Ō, 熙成王). Furthermore, a note next to his name states, "After surrendering at Yoshino, he was given the honorary title of Emperor Emeritus (Daijō Tennō, 太上天皇) Go-Kameyama as a matter of expediency.". Because the Southern Court was recognized as the legitimate imperial line in 1911, he has been counted among the successive emperors ever since.
(1)		Kazuhito 量仁	Emperor Kōgon 光厳天皇	1331–1333 (2 years) Gentoku, Shōkyō	1313–1364 (51 years) Son of Emperor Go-Fushimi; nephew and adopted son of Emperor Hanazono. From the Jimyōin line. Made the first emperor of the Northern Court by the Kamakura shogunate during the Genkō War. Deposed by Emperor Go-Daigo of the Daikakuji line. Captured by the Southern Court during the Kannō disturbance. Based on the Honchō Kōin Shōunroku (本朝皇胤紹運録), which regards the "Northern Court" as the legitimate line, he is 96th emperor. Because the Southern Court was recognized as the legitimate imperial line in 1911, he was no longer counted among the successive emperors from then. However, he is treated as one of the emperors who actually reigned.
(2)		Yutahito 豊仁	Emperor Kōmyō 光明天皇	1336–1348 (12 years) Kenmu, Ryakuō, Kōei, Jōwa	1322–1380 (58 years) Son of Emperor Go-Fushimi; younger brother of Emperor Kōgon. Made second emperor of the Northern Court by the Ashikaga shogunate. Abdicated. Captured by the Southern Court during the Kannō disturbance. Based on the Honchō Kōin Shōunroku (本朝皇胤紹運録), which regards the "Northern Court" as the legitimate line, he is 97th emperor. Because the Southern Court was recognized as the legitimate imperial line in 1911, he was no longer counted among the successive emperors from then. However, he is treated as one of the emperors who actually reigned.
(3)		Okihito (Note: Previously named Masuhito (益仁).) 興仁	Emperor Sukō 崇光天皇	1348–1351 (3 years) Jōwa, Kannō	1334–1398 (64 years) Son of Emperor Kōgon; nephew of Emperor Kōmyō. Third emperor of the Northern Court. Abdicated. Captured by the Southern Court during the Kannō disturbance. Based on the Honchō Kōin Shōunroku (本朝皇胤紹運録), which regards the "Northern Court" as the legitimate line, he is 98th emperor. Because the Southern Court was recognized as the legitimate imperial line in 1911, he was no longer counted among the successive emperors from then. However, he is treated as one of the emperors who actually reigned.
(4)		Iyahito 彌仁	Emperor Go-Kōgon 後光厳天皇	1352–1371 (19 years) Bunna, Kōan, Jōji, Ōan	1338–1374 (36 years) Son of Emperor Kōgon; younger brother of Emperor Sukō. Became the fourth Emperor of the Northern Court after the Kannō disturbance. Abdicated. Based on the Honchō Kōin Shōunroku (本朝皇胤紹運録), which regards the "Northern Court" as the legitimate line, he is 99th emperor. Because the Southern Court was recognized as the legitimate imperial line in 1911, he was no longer counted among the successive emperors from then. However, he is treated as one of the emperors who actually reigned.
(5)		Ohito 緒仁	Emperor Go-En'yū 後円融天皇	1371–1382 (11 years) Ōan, Eiwa, Kōryaku, Eitoku	1359–1393 (34 years) Son of Emperor Go-Kōgon. Fifth emperor of the Northern Court. Abdicated in favor of Emperor Go-Komatsu. Based on the Honchō Kōin Shōunroku (本朝皇胤紹運録), which regards the "Northern Court" as the legitimate line, he is 100th emperor. Because the Southern Court was recognized as the legitimate imperial line in 1911, he was no longer counted among the successive emperors from then. However, he is treated as one of the emperors who actually reigned.
(6)		Motohito 幹仁	Emperor Go-Komatsu (Note: Also known as Emperor Go-Kōkō.) 後小松天皇	1382–1392 (10 years) Eitoku, Shitoku, Kakei, Kōō, Meitoku	1377–1433 (56 years) Son of Emperor Go-En'yū. Sixth and last emperor of the Northern Court from 1382 until 1392. Became the legitimate emperor following Emperor Go-Kameyama's abdication. Agreed to alternate control of the throne by the Northern Court and the Southern Court. All emperors after him are from the Northern line. Because the Southern Court was recognized as the legitimate imperial line in 1911, his reign as one of the successive emperors was considered from 1392 onward after 1911.
100		Motohito 幹仁	Emperor Go-Komatsu 後小松天皇	1392–1412 (20 years) Meitoku, Ōei	1377–1433 (56 years) Son of Emperor Go-En'yū. Sixth and last emperor of the Northern Court from 1382 until 1392. Became the legitimate emperor following Emperor Go-Kameyama's abdication. Agreed to alternate control of the throne by the Northern Court and the Southern Court. All emperors after him are from the Northern line. Because the Southern Court was recognized as the legitimate imperial line in 1911, his reign as one of the successive emperors was considered from 1392 onward after 1911.
101		Mihito (Note: Initially written as 躬仁.) 実仁	Emperor Shōkō 称光天皇	5 October 1412 – 30 August 1428 (15 years, 330 days) Ōei, Shōchō	12 May 1401 – 30 August 1428 (27 years) Son of Emperor Go-Komatsu.
102		Hikohito 彦仁	Emperor Go-Hanazono 後花園天皇	7 September 1428 – 21 August 1464 (35 years, 349 days) Shōchō, Eikyō, Kakitsu, Bun'an, Hōtoku, Kyōtoku, Kōshō, Chōroku, Kanshō	10 July 1419 – 18 January 1471 (51 years) Great-grandson of Northern Emperor Sukō; third cousin of Emperor Shōkō. Abdicated. Traditional dates used.
103		Fusahito 成仁	Emperor Go-Tsuchimikado 後土御門天皇	21 August 1464 – 21 October 1500 (36 years, 61 days) Kanshō, Bunshō, Ōnin, Bunmei, Chōkyō, Entoku, Meiō	3 July 1442 – 21 October 1500 (58 years) Son of Emperor Go-Hanazono. Ōnin War led to the start of the Sengoku period.
104		Katsuhito 勝仁	Emperor Go-Kashiwabara (Note: Also known as Emperor Go-Kanmu.) 後柏原天皇	16 November 1500 – 18 May 1526 (25 years, 183 days) Meiō, Bunki, Daiei	19 November 1462 – 18 May 1526 (63 years) Son of Emperor Go-Tsuchimikado. Imperial rule in the Ashikaga shogunate reached its lowest point in his reign.
105		Tomohito 知仁	Emperor Go-Nara (Note: Also known as Emperor Go-Heizei.) 後奈良天皇	9 June 1526 – 27 September 1557 (31 years, 110 days) Daiei, Kyōroku, Tenbun, Kōji	26 January 1495 – 27 September 1557 (62 years) Son of Emperor Go-Kashiwabara.
106		Michihito 方仁	Emperor Ōgimachi 正親町天皇	17 November 1557 – 17 December 1586 (29 years, 30 days) Kōji, Eiroku, Genki, Tenshō	18 June 1517 – 6 February 1593 (75 years) Son of Emperor Go-Nara. Ashikaga shogunate overthrown by Oda Nobunaga. Abdicated.
107		Katahito (Note: Also known as Kazuhito (和仁).) 周仁	Emperor Go-Yōzei 後陽成天皇	17 December 1586 – 9 May 1611 (24 years, 143 days) Tenshō, Bunroku, Keichō	31 December 1571 – 25 September 1617 (45 years) Grandson of Emperor Ōgimachi. Tokugawa shogunate established. Sengoku period ended.

=== Edo period (1603–1868) ===
No.	Portrait	Personal name	Posthumous name	Reign and era names	Life details
108		Kotohito (Note: Also known as Masahito.) 政仁	Emperor Go-Mizunoo (Note: Also known as Emperor Go-Minoo or Emperor Go-Seiwa.) 後水尾天皇	9 May 1611 – 22 December 1629 (18 years, 227 days) Keichō, Genna, Kan'ei	29 June 1596 – 11 September 1680 (84 years) Son of Emperor Go-Yōzei. Japan implements isolationist policy. Purple Robe Incident led to his abdication.
109		Okiko 興子	Empress Meishō 明正天皇	22 December 1629 – 14 November 1643 (13 years, 327 days) Kan'ei	9 January 1624 – 4 December 1696 (72 years) Daughter of Emperor Go-Mizunoo. Abdicated.
110		Tsuguhito 紹仁	Emperor Go-Kōmyō 後光明天皇	14 November 1643 – 30 October 1654 (10 years, 350 days) Kan'ei, Shōhō, Keian, Jōō	20 April 1633 – 30 October 1654 (21 years) Son of Emperor Go-Mizunoo; younger half-brother of Empress Meishō.
111		Nagahito (Note: Also known as Yoshihito.) 良仁	Emperor Go-Sai (Note: Also known as Emperor Go-Saiin (後西院天皇) or Emperor Go-Junna.) 後西天皇	5 January 1655 – 5 March 1663 (8 years, 59 days) Jōō, Meireki, Manji, Kanbun	1 January 1638 – 22 March 1685 (47 years) Son of Emperor Go-Mizunoo; younger half-brother of Empress Meishō and Emperor Go-Kōmyō. Abdicated.
112		Satohito 識仁	Emperor Reigen 霊元天皇	5 March 1663 – 2 May 1687 (24 years, 58 days) Kanbun, Enpō, Tenna, Jōkyō	9 July 1654 – 24 September 1732 (78 years) Son of Emperor Go-Mizunoo. Abdicated.
113		Asahito (Note: Also known as Tomohito.) 朝仁	Emperor Higashiyama 東山天皇	2 May 1687 – 27 July 1709 (22 years, 86 days) Jōkyō, Genroku, Hōei	21 October 1675 – 16 January 1710 (34 years) Son of Emperor Reigen. Abdicated.
114		Yasuhito (Note: Also known as Yoshihito.) 慶仁	Emperor Nakamikado 中御門天皇	27 July 1709 – 13 April 1735 (25 years, 260 days) Hōei, Shōtoku, Kyōhō	14 January 1702 – 10 May 1737 (35 years) Son of Emperor Higashiyama. Abdicated.
115		Teruhito 昭仁	Emperor Sakuramachi 桜町天皇	13 April 1735 – 9 June 1747 (12 years, 57 days) Kyōhō, Genbun, Kanpō, Enkyō	8 February 1720 – 28 May 1750 (30 years) Son of Emperor Nakamikado. Abdicated.
116		Tōhito 遐仁	Emperor Momozono 桃園天皇	9 June 1747 – 1762 (14–15 years) Enkyō, Kan'en, Hōreki	14 April 1741 – 31 August 1762 (21 years) Son of Emperor Sakuramachi. Abdicated.
117		Toshiko 智子	Empress Go-Sakuramachi 後桜町天皇	15 September 1762 – 9 January 1771 (8 years, 116 days) Hōreki, Meiwa	23 September 1740 – 24 December 1813 (73 years) Daughter of Emperor Sakuramachi; younger sister of Emperor Momozono. Abdicated.
118		Hidehito 英仁	Emperor Go-Momozono 後桃園天皇	9 January 1771 – 16 December 1779 (8 years, 341 days) Meiwa, An'ei	5 August 1758 – 16 December 1779 (21 years) Son of Emperor Momozono; nephew of Empress Go-Sakuramachi.
119		Morohito 師仁	Emperor Kōkaku 光格天皇	16 December 1779 – 7 May 1817 (37 years, 142 days) An'ei, Tenmei, Kansei, Kyōwa, Bunka	23 September 1771 – 11 December 1840 (69 years) Great-grandson of Emperor Higashiyama; cousin and adopted son of Emperor Go-Momozono. Abdicated.
120		Ayahito 恵仁	Emperor Ninkō 仁孝天皇	7 May 1817 – 21 February 1846 (28 years, 290 days) Bunka, Bunsei, Tenpō, Kōka	16 March 1800 – 21 February 1846 (45 years) Son of Emperor Kōkaku.
121		Osahito 統仁	Emperor Kōmei 孝明天皇	10 March 1846 – 30 January 1867 (20 years, 326 days) Kōka, Kaei, Ansei, Man'en, Bunkyū, Genji, Keiō	22 July 1831 – 30 January 1867 (35 years) Son of Emperor Ninkō. Reigned during the Bakumatsu period during which Japan ended its isolationist policy and changed from Tokugawa rule to Imperial rule. Last instance of an emperor with multiple era names.

=== Modern Japan (1867–present) ===
No.	Portrait	Personal name	Posthumous name	Reign and era names	Life details
122		Mutsuhito 睦仁	Emperor Meiji 明治天皇	30 January 1867 – 30 July 1912 (45 years, 182 days) Keiō, Meiji	3 November 1852 – 30 July 1912 (Aged 59) Son of Emperor Kōmei. Ended the Tokugawa shogunate with the Meiji Restoration (3 January 1868). First emperor of the Empire of Japan.
123		Yoshihito 嘉仁	Emperor Taishō 大正天皇	30 July 1912 – 25 December 1926 (14 years, 148 days) Taishō	31 August 1879 – 25 December 1926 (Aged 47) Son of Emperor Meiji. Taishō Democracy shifted political power from the genrō to the Imperial Diet and political parties. His eldest son, Crown Prince Hirohito, served as Sesshō (摂政; "Regent") from 1921 to 1926 because of Taishō's illness.
124		Hirohito 裕仁	Emperor Shōwa 昭和天皇	25 December 1926 – 7 January 1989 (62 years, 13 days) Shōwa	29 April 1901 – 7 January 1989 (Aged 87) Son of Emperor Taishō. Served as Sesshō from 1921 to 1926. Last emperor of the Empire of Japan. Reign saw World War II and post-war economic miracle. Longest-reigning verifiable emperor.
125		Akihito 明仁	Living	7 January 1989 – 30 April 2019 (30 years, 113 days) Heisei	born 23 December 1933 (Age 92) Son of Emperor Shōwa. Abdicated and later referred to as Jōkō (上皇; "Emperor Emeritus"). Longest-living verifiable emperor.
126		Naruhito 徳仁	Living	1 May 2019 – present (7 years, 184 days) Reiwa	born 23 February 1960 (Age 66) Son of Akihito. Referred to as Kinjō Tennō (今上天皇; "the Reigning Emperor") or Tennō Heika (天皇陛下; "His Majesty the Emperor").

== Individuals granted the title of Emperor without having ascended the throne ==
This is a list of individuals who did not reign as emperor during their lifetime but granted the title of Emperor.

Portrait	Personal name	Posthumous name	Year recognized	Life details
	Prince Kusakabe 草壁皇子	Emperor Oka 岡宮天皇	759	662–689 (27 years) Son of Emperor Tenmu; husband of Empress Genmei; father of Emperor Monmu and Empress Genshō. Made crown prince in 681; heir to Emperor Tenmu. Died prior to acceding the throne following Emperor Tenmu's death.
	Prince Toneri 舎人親王	Emperor Sudōjinkei 崇道尽敬皇帝	759	676–735 (59 years) Son of Emperor Tenmu; half-brother of Prince Kusakabe; father of Emperor Junnin.
	Prince Shiki 志貴皇子	Emperor Kasuga 春日宮天皇	770	died 716 Son of Emperor Tenji; half-brother of Emperor Tenmu, Empress Jitō, Empress Genmei and Emperor Kōbun; father of Emperor Kōnin; half-uncle of Prince Kusakabe and Prince Toneri.
	Prince Sawara 早良親王	Emperor Sudō 崇道天皇	800	750–785 (35 years) Son of Emperor Kōnin; younger brother of Emperor Kanmu. Made crown prince in 781. Implicated in the assassination of Fujiwara no Tanetsugu. Died on the way to exile.
	Prince Morisada 守貞親王	Emperor Go-Takakura 後高倉天皇		Father of Emperor Go-Horikawa.
	Sadafusa, Prince Fushimi 伏見宮貞成親王	Emperor Go-Sukō 後崇光天皇		Father of Emperor Go-Hanazono.
	Prince Masahito 誠仁親王	Yōkōin 陽光院	Before 1611	1552–1586 (34 years) Son of Emperor Emperor Ōgimachi; father of Emperor Go-Yōzei. Posthumously recognized as emperor by Emperor Go-Yōzei.
	Sukehito, Prince Kan'in 閑院宮典仁親王	Emperor Kyōkō 慶光天皇	1884	1733–1794 (61 years) Grandson of Emperor Higashiyama; father of Emperor Kōkaku.

== Individuals who are sometimes treated as emperors ==
No.	Portrait	Personal name	Posthumous name	Reign	Life details
–		Okinagatarashi 息長帯比売	Empress Jingū 神功皇后	201–269 (68 years)	170–269 (99 years) Wife of Emperor Chūai; mother and regent of Emperor Ōjin. Not counted among the officially numbered emperors. Presumed legendary. According to the Honchō Kōin Shōunroku ( 本朝皇胤紹運録), she is the 15th emperor.
–		Iitoyo 飯豊皇女	Empress Tsunuzashi 都奴佐之天皇	484 (11 months)	440–485 (45 years) Imperial princess; granddaughter of Emperor Richū, wife of Emperor Seinei and mother of Emperor Kenzō according to later traditions; not counted among the official emperors.

== See also ==
- Emperor of Japan
- Empress of Japan
  - List of empresses consort of Japan
- Sesshō and Kampaku
- Shogun
  - List of shoguns
- Prime Minister of Japan
  - List of prime ministers of Japan
- Family tree of Japanese monarchs
- Princess Iitoyo
