= Tenju =

Period of Japanese history (1375–1381)

Tenju (天授) was a Japanese era name (年号, nengō, lit. year name) of the Southern Court during the Era of Northern and Southern Courts after Bunchū and before Kōwa. This period spanned the years from May 1375 to February 1381. The Southern Court emperor in Yoshino during this time-frame was Emperor Chōkei (長慶天皇, Chōkei-tennō). The Northern court emperor in Kyoto was Emperor Go-En'yū (後円融天皇, Go-En'yū-tennō).

== Nanboku-chō overview ==
The Imperial seats during the Nanboku-chō period were in relatively close proximity, but geographically distinct. They were conventionally identified as: Northern capital : Kyoto; Southern capital : Yoshino.

During the Meiji period, an Imperial decree dated March 3, 1911 established that the legitimate reigning monarchs of this period were the direct descendants of Emperor Go-Daigo through Emperor Go-Murakami, whose Southern Court (南朝, nanchō) had been established in exile in Yoshino, near Nara.

Until the end of the Edo period, the militarily superior pretender-Emperors supported by the Ashikaga shogunate had been mistakenly incorporated in Imperial chronologies despite the undisputed fact that the Imperial Regalia were not in their possession.

This illegitimate Northern Court (北朝, hokuchō) had been established in Kyoto by Ashikaga Takauji.

== Change of era ==
- 1375, also called Tenju gannen (天授元年): The new era name was created to mark an event or series of events. The previous era ended and the new one commenced in Bunchū 4.

In this time frame, Eiwa (1375–1379) and Kōryaku (1379–1381) were the Northern Court equivalent nengō.

== Events of the Tenju Era ==
- 1375 (Tenju 1): Shōgun Ashikaga Yoshimitsu visits the Iwashimizu Hachiman-gū where he worships publicly; and he offers a sword for the shrine's treasury, gold foil for the embellishment of the shrine, and a racehorses for the shrine's stable.
- 1375 (Tenju 2): For the first time, Shōgun Yoshimitsu is permitted to enter the precincts of the Imperial quarters at the Imperial palace in Kyoto.
- 1377 (Tenju 2): Goryeo diplomatic envoy Chŏng Mong-ju met with the shogunal deputy (探題, tandai) in Kyūshū, Imagawa Ryōshun. The objective of this diplomatic mission was to begin negotiating steps to control pirates (wakō).
- 1378 (Tenju 4): Yoshimitsu moves into his new home in Muromachi; and the luxurious house and grounds are called Hana-no-Gosho
- 1379 (Tenju 5): Shiba Yoshimasa becomes Kanrei.
- 1380 (Tenju 6): Kusunoki Masanori rejoins Kameyama; southern army suffers reverses.
- July 26, 1380 (Tenju 6, 24th day of the 6th month): The former Emperor Kōmyō died at age 60.

== Notes ==
Preceded by Bunchū	Era or nengō Tenju; 1375–1381	Succeeded by Kōwa
