= Ashikaga Yoshimitsu =

Military ruler of Japan from 1368 to 1394

- 足利 義満
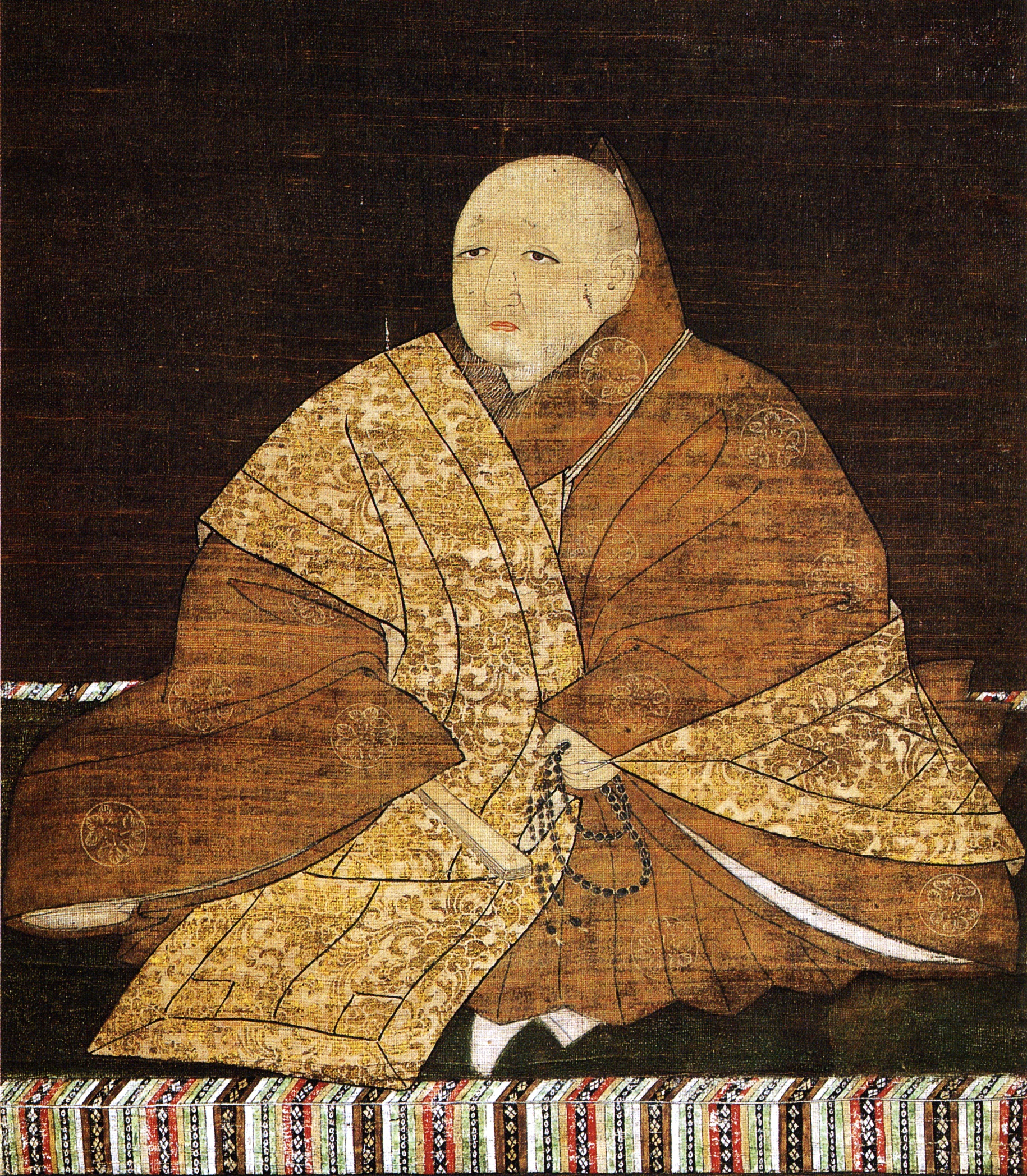

Shōgun
- In office February 7, 1369 – January 8, 1395
- Monarchs: Chōkei; Go-Kameyama; Go-Komatsu
- Preceded by: Ashikaga Yoshiakira
- Succeeded by: Ashikaga Yoshimochi

Personal details
- Born: September 25, 1358
- Died: May 31, 1408 (aged 49)
- Spouses: Wife: Hino Nariko; Concubine: Hino Yasuko; Among others...
- Children: Ashikaga Yoshimochi; Ashikaga Yoshinori
- Parents: Ashikaga Yoshiakira; Ki no Yoshiko
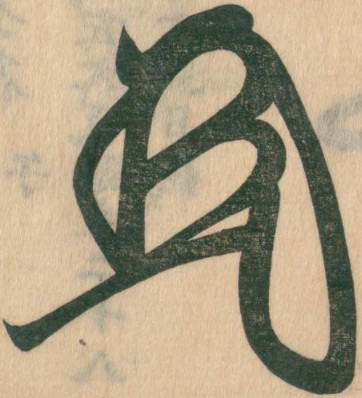
- Signature

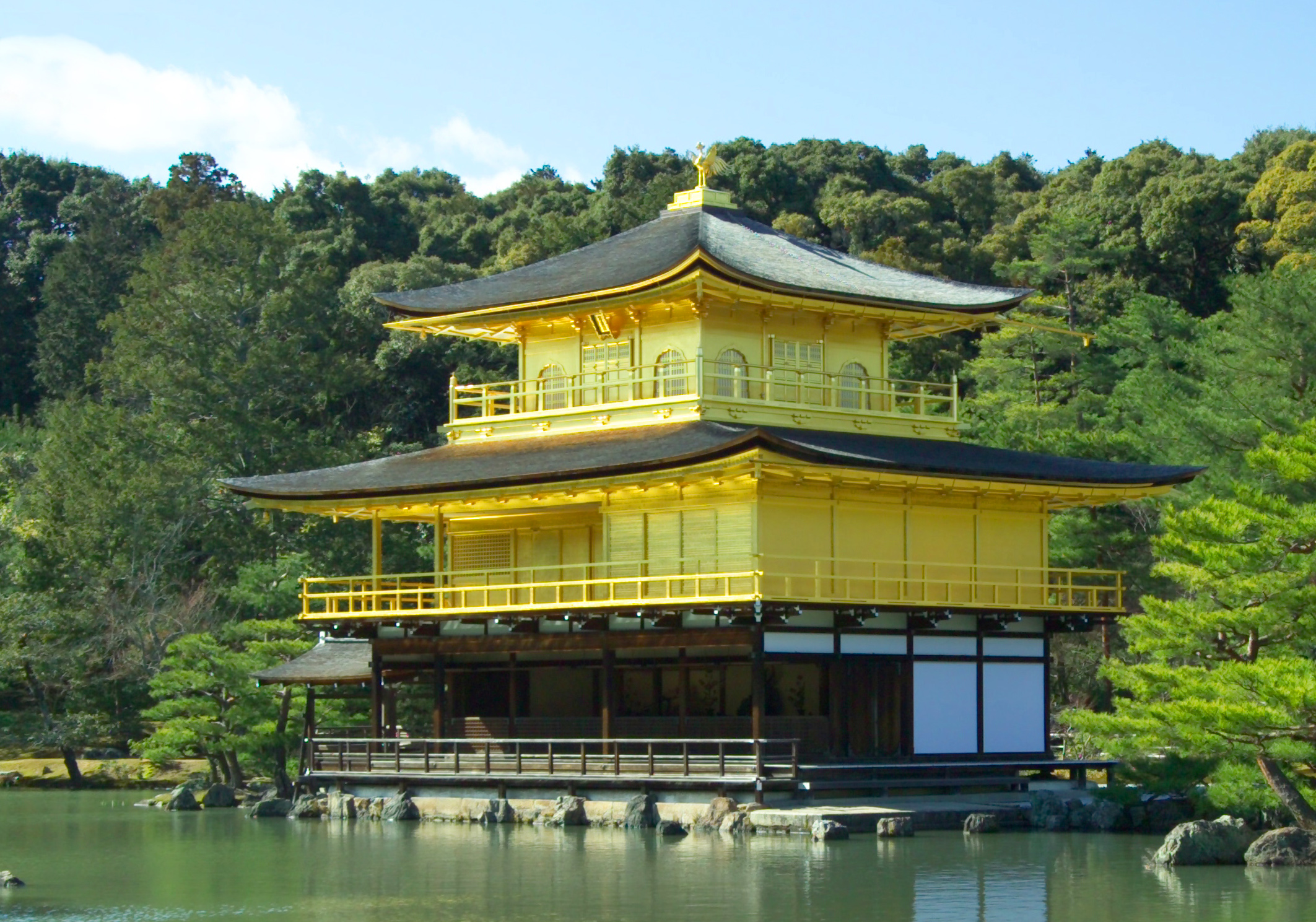
Kinkakuji Temple, the Golden Pavilion at Kinkaku-ji, originated as the villa of Ashikaga Yoshimitsu.

Ashikaga Yoshimitsu (Note: Japanese pronunciation: [ä̀.ɕi̥.kä́.ɡä̀ | jò̞.ɕí.mʲì.t͡sɨ̀, -ŋä̀ | jò̞-, -ɡä́ jó̞-, -ŋä́ jó̞-]) (足利 義満; September 25, 1358 – May 31, 1408) was the third shōgun of the Ashikaga shogunate, ruling from 1368 to 1394 during the Muromachi period of Japan. Yoshimitsu was Ashikaga Yoshiakira's third son but the oldest son to survive, his childhood name being Haruō (春王). Yoshimitsu was appointed shōgun, a hereditary title as head of the military estate, in 1368 at the age of ten; at twenty he was admitted to the imperial court as Acting Grand Counselor (Gon Dainagon 権大納言).

In 1379, Yoshimitsu reorganized the institutional framework of the Gozan Zen 五山禅 establishment before, two years later, becoming the first person of the warrior (samurai) class to host a reigning emperor at his private residence. In 1392, he negotiated the end of the Nanboku-chō imperial schism that had plagued politics for over half a century. Two years later he became Grand Chancellor of State (Daijō daijin 太政大臣), the highest-ranking member of the imperial court.

Retiring from that and all public offices in 1395, Yoshimitsu took the tonsure and moved into his Kitayama-dono (北山殿) retirement villa which, among other things, boasted a pavilion two-thirds covered in gold leaf (Kinkaku shariden 金閣舎利殿). There, he received envoys from the Ming and Joseon courts on at least six occasions and forged the terms of a Sino-Japanese trade agreement that endured for over a century. In recognition for his diplomatic efforts and overt displays of subservience as a tributary, the Chinese sovereign pronounced Yoshimitsu "King of Japan" (Nihon kokuō 日本国王).

In 1407, he set into motion a plan to become "Daijō tenno" (太上天皇), a title customarily applied to a retired emperor. Although unrealized due to his sudden death the following year, this last venture was particularly audacious because Yoshimitsu never actually sat on the Japanese throne. Late in his career, it appears Yoshimitsu sought to legitimize his transcendent authority through the idiom of Buddhist kingship, deploying ritual, symbols, and monumentalism to cast him as a universal monarch or dharma king, not unlike his counterparts in Southeast Asia. His posthumous name was Rokuon'in (鹿苑院).

== Biography ==
In 1368 Yoshimitsu was appointed shōgun; at the same time Emperor Chōkei ascended the southern throne. In the following year, the Southern Court samurai Kusunoki Masanori who was under the employ of the emperor defected to the Ashikaga bakufu (he would later defect again to royalist forces under Emperor Kameyama in 1380). However, Kusunoki was defeated in 1390.

While in 1370, the renowned commander Imagawa Sadayo was sent to subdue Kyushu; the region would later be pacified by 1389, which leads to Yoshimitsu distributing lands there. There was an uprising in Kyushu but this was later suppressed in 1397 (another uprising in Mutsu was suppressed in 1402).

The southern army suffered reverses in 1380 but enjoyed a resurgence in 1382. The Koga Domain, a region of the Southern army was defeated in 1385.

In 1392, the Northern and Southern courts were reconciled under Emperor Go-Komatsu. Yoshimitsu officially ceded his position to his son Ashikaga Yoshimochi in 1394 who was appointed the new shōgun. The Muromachi administration was later organized in 1398. Although Yoshimitsu retired in 1394, the old shōgun did not abandon any of his powers. Yoshimitsu continued to maintain authority over the shogunate until his death. Yoshimitsu is recognized as Nippon Koku-Ō (King of Japan) by Yongle Emperor in 1404.

Yoshimitsu died suddenly in 1408 at age 49. After his death, his retirement villa (near Kyoto) became Rokuon-ji, which today is famous for its three-storied, gold-leaf covered reliquary known as "Kinkaku". So famous is this single structure, in fact, that the entire temple itself is often identified as the Kinkaku-ji, the Temple of the Golden Pavilion. A statue of Yoshimitsu is found there today.

== Contributions ==
Yoshimitsu resolved the rift between the Northern and Southern Courts in 1392, when he persuaded Go-Kameyama of the Southern Court to hand over the Imperial Regalia to Emperor Go-Komatsu of the Northern Court. Yoshimitsu's greatest political achievement was that he managed to bring about the end to constant fighting during the Nanboku-chō period. This event had the effect of firmly establishing the authority of the Muromachi shogunate and suppressing the power of the regional daimyōs who might challenge central authority.

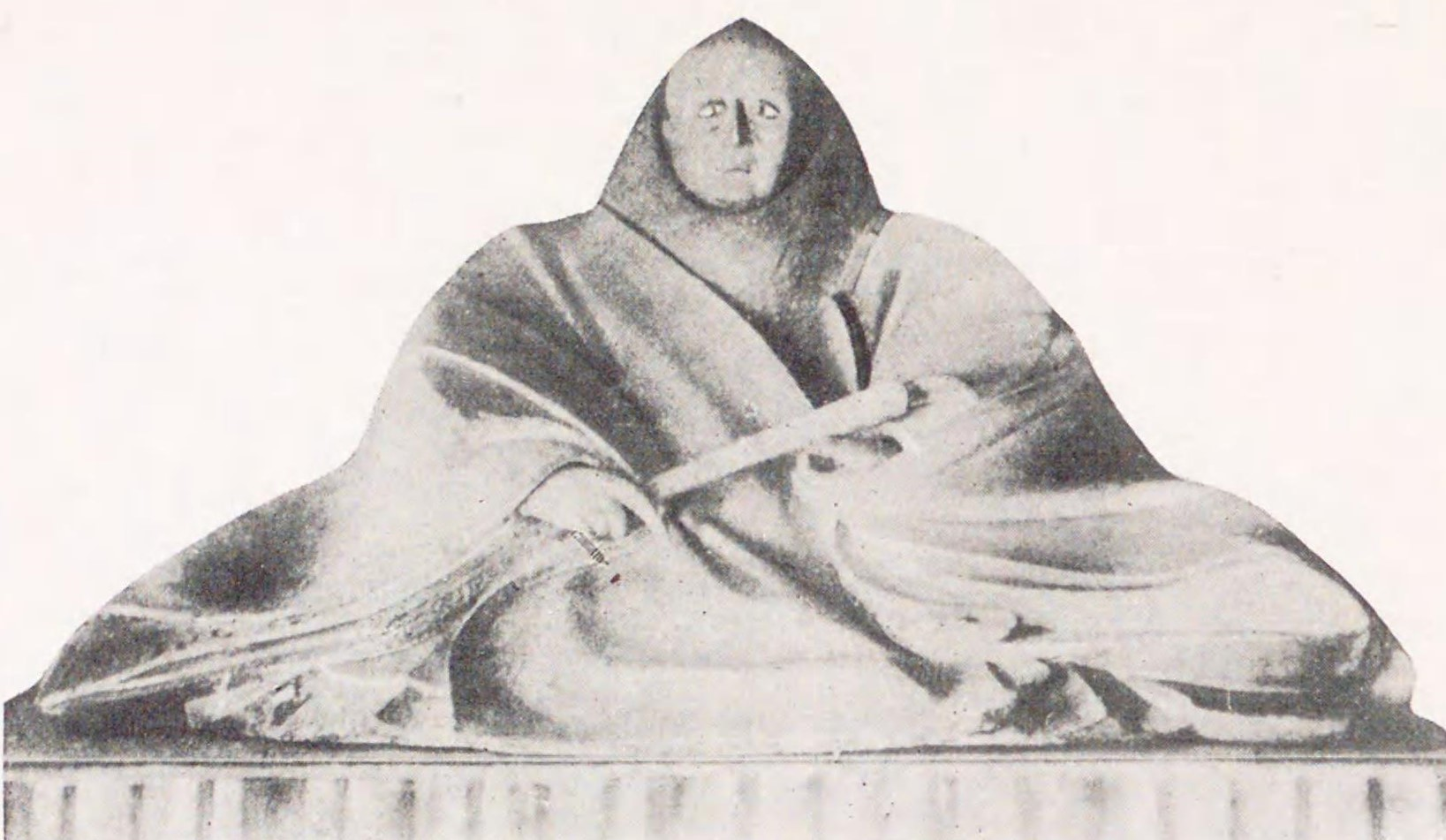
Lost statue of Ashikaga Yoshimitsu at Kinkaku-ji.

Yoshimitsu commissions the Muromachi palace in Kyoto's elite district of Kamigyo in 1378, on the site of the former residence of the nobleman Saionji Sanekane.

He also played a major role in the genesis of Noh theatre, as the patron and lover of Zeami Motokiyo, the actor considered to be Noh's founder, whom Yoshimitsu encouraged to give a loftier treatment to his art.

The Ashikaga shogunate and the corresponding time period are often referred to as the Muromachi shogunate or the Muromachi period in Japanese historiography because Yoshimitsu constructed his residential headquarters along the Muromachi Road in the northern part of Kyoto in 1378.

== Tributary relations with the Ming dynasty ==
Yoshimitsu accepted tributary relations with Ming China in 1401. In 1402 or 1404, Yoshimitsu accepted the title "King of Japan" from the Ming while the nominal sovereign of Japan still resided in Kyōto. Yoshimitsu bowed three times while kneeling and read a Ming government document addressing him as the "king of Japan" and instructing him to adopt the Ming calendar. In 1403, Yoshimitsu sent a letter to the Ming emperor addressing himself as "Your subject, the King of Japan". Yoshimitsu was the first and only Japanese leader in the early modern period to accept a title from China. Concordant with increased communication between the Muromachi Shogunate and the Ming dynasty between 1373–1406, during this period Japan received a significant influx of Ming influence to its economic system, architecture, philosophy and religion, and writing.

The act of submission towards the Ming is viewed negatively by many modern Japanese historians. Tsuji Zennosuke and Kuroita Katsumi described Yoshimitsu's decision as a violation of Japan's national tradition, an act of disloyalty to the Japanese throne, and brought shame and disgrace to Japan. Zuikei Shuho, a contemporary of Yoshimitsu, pointed out that the word "your subject" should only be used to show allegiance to the Japanese emperor. In 1411, Yoshimitsu's successor and son, Ashikaga Yoshimochi, ended Japanese embassies to the Ming and repudiated his predecessor by stating that "ever since antiquity our country has never called itself a vassal of a foreign land".

However, there were also supporters of Yoshimitsu's choice to accept official tributary status with the Ming. Arai Hakuseki, a supporter of the military class, wrote in his Tokushi yoron that Yoshimitsu increased his reputation outside Japan by being recognized as the ruler of Japan by the Ming. Haruseki believed that it was proper to use the title "King of Japan" because the shōgun was the de facto ruler rather than the Japanese emperor.

Several explanations have been given for why Yoshimitsu accepted tributary relations with the Ming, including: he was not aware of the political significance of his action, he accepted tributary relations to increase trade, he accepted tributary relations to solidify his own position within Japan as its ruler rather than the Japanese emperor.

== Family ==
- Father: Ashikaga Yoshiakira
- Mother: Ki no Yoshiko (1336–1413)
- Wife: Hino Nariko (1351–1405)
- Concubines:
  - Ichijo no Tsubone
  - Hino Yasuko (1369–1419)
  - Fujiwara no Yoshiko (1358–1399)
  - Kaga no Tsubone (d. 1422)
  - Kasuga no Tsubone
  - Nefu'in (1370–1421)
  - Fujiwara no Kyoko (1369–1406)
  - Fujiwara no Tomoko (d. 1426)
  - Fujiwara no Kenichi
  - Keijun'in
  - Takahashi-dono (d. 1429)
  - Ikegami-dono (d. 1426)
- Children:
  - a daughter by Nariko
  - Ashikaga Yoshimochi by Yoshiko
  - Ashikaga Yoshinori by Yoshiko
  - Ashikaga Yoshitsugu (1394–1418) by Kasuga
  - Daijiin Seishou (1395–1433) by Nefu'in
  - Gisho (1406–1467) by Tomoko
  - Irie Juzen (1397–1415) by Yoshiko
  - Sonman by Kaga
  - Hodo (1385–1387) by Kaga
  - a boy (1394–1436) by Kyoko
  - Daijin'in Sei (1396–1453) by Kyoko
  - a daughter married Rokkaku Mitsutsuna
  - Kaji Yoshiaki (1406–1467) by Tomoko
  - Koshoin by Keijun'in
  - a daughter by Ikegami
  - Kozan Eiryu (1403–1442) by Ikegami

== Eras of Yoshimitsu's bakufu ==
The years in which Yoshimitsu was shōgun are more specifically identified by more than one era name or nengō.

Nanboku-chō southern court

- Eras as reckoned by legitimate Court (as determined by Meiji rescript):
  - Shōhei (1346–1370)
  - Kentoku (1370–1372)
  - Bunchū (1372–1375)
  - Tenju (1375–1381)
  - Kōwa (1381–1384)
  - Genchū (1384–1393)

Nanboku-chō northern court

- Eras as reckoned by pretender Court (as determined by Meiji rescript):
  - Ōan (1368–1375)
  - Eiwa (1375–1379)
  - Kōryaku (1379–1381)
  - Eitoku (1381–1384)
  - Shitoku (1384–1387)
  - Kakei (1387–1389)
  - Kōō (1389–1390)
  - Meitoku (1390–1393)‡

Post-Nanboku-chō reunified court

- Eras merged as Meitoku 3 replaced Genchū 9 as Go-Kameyama abdicated.
  - Meitoku (1393–1394)‡
  - Ōei (1394–1428)

== Bibliography ==
- Ackroyd, Joyce I. (1982) Lessons from History: the Tokushi Yoron. Brisbane: University of Queensland Press. ISBN 9780702214851; OCLC 7574544
- Lee, Ji-Young (2017), China's Hegemony: Four Hundred Years of East Asian Domination, Columbia University Press
- Morton, W. Scott and J. Kenneth Olenik. (1973). Japan: Its History and Culture. Newton Abbot, Devon: David & Charles. ISBN 9780715357682; OCLC 462186835
- Ng, Wai-ming (2019), Imagining China in Tokugawa Japan: Legends, Classics, and Historical Terms, State University of New York Press, Albany
- Pier, Garrett Chatfield. (1914). Temple Treasures of Japan. New York: Frederick Fairchild Sherman. OCLC 535337
- Stavros, Matthew, and Norika Kurioka. "Imperial Progress to the Muromachi Palace, 1381 A Study and Annotated Translation of Sakayuku Hana". Japan Review 28 (2015): 3–46. JSTOR 43684115
- Stavros, Matthew (December 2017). "Monuments and Mandalas in Medieval Kyoto: Reading Buddhist Kingship in the Urban Plan of Ashikaga Yoshimitsu". Harvard Journal of Asiatic Studies. 77: 321–361
- Titsingh, Isaac. (1834). Nihon Ōdai Ichiran; ou, Annales des empereurs du Japon. Paris: Royal Asiatic Society, Oriental Translation Fund of Great Britain and Ireland. OCLC 585069
- Turnbull, Stephen. (2005). Samurai Commanders. Oxford: Osprey Press. ISBN 9781841767437; ISBN 9781841767444; OCLC 60834971
- Worden, Robert L. (1994). "Kamakura and Muromachi Periods, 1185–1573; Economic and Cultural Developments", A Country Study: Japan. Washington, D.C.: Federal Research Division, Library of Congress.

Preceded by Ashikaga Yoshiakira	Shōgun: Ashikaga Yoshimitsu; 1368–1394	Succeeded by Ashikaga Yoshimochi
