= Bunchū =

Period of Japanese history (1372–1375)

Bunchū (文中) was a Japanese era name (年号, nengō, lit. year name) of the Southern Court during the Era of Northern and Southern Courts after Kentoku and before Tenju. This period spanned the years from October 1372 to May 1375. The Southern Court emperor in Yoshino during this timeframe was Emperor Chōkei (長慶天皇, Chōkei-tennō). The Northern court emperor in Kyoto was Emperor Go-En'yū (後円融天皇, Go-En'yū-tennō).

== Nanboku-chō overview ==
The Imperial seats during the Nanboku-chō period were in relatively close proximity, but geographically distinct. They were conventionally identified as: Northern capital : Kyoto; Southern capital : Yoshino.

During the Meiji period, an Imperial decree dated March 3, 1911, established that the legitimate reigning monarchs of this period were the direct descendants of Emperor Go-Daigo through Emperor Go-Murakami, whose Southern Court (南朝, nanchō) had been established in exile in Yoshino, near Nara.

Until the end of the Edo period, the militarily superior pretender-Emperors supported by the Ashikaga shogunate had been mistakenly incorporated in Imperial chronologies, despite the undisputed fact that the Imperial Regalia were not in their possession.

This illegitimate Northern Court (北朝, hokuchō) had been established in Kyoto by Ashikaga Takauji.

== Change of era ==
- 1372, also called Bunchū gannen (文中元年): The new era name was created to mark an event or series of events. The previous era ended and the new one commenced in Kentoku 3.

In this time frame, Ōan (1368–1375) was the Southern Court equivalent nengō.

== Events of the Bunchū Era ==
- 1372 (Bunchū 1): Shōgun Ashikaga Yoshimitsu establishes an annual revenue for Iwashimizu Hachiman-gū.
- 1373-1406 (Bunchū 2 – Ōei 13): Embassies between China and Japan.
- 1374 (Bunchū 3): The former Emperor Go-Kōgon died at age 73,
- 1374 (Bunchū 3): Emperor Go-En'yū ascends northern throne.

== Notes ==
Preceded by Kentoku	Era or nengō Bunchū; 1372–1375	Succeeded by Tenju
