= Kumazawa Hiromichi =

Japanese businessman and Buddhist priest (1889-1966)

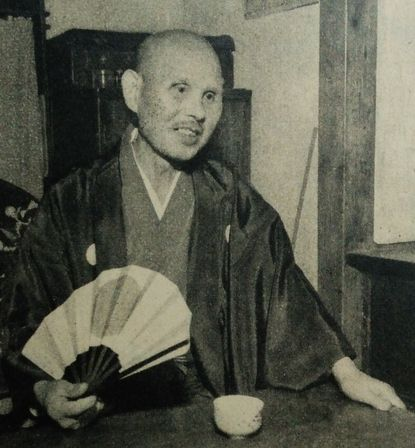
- Kumazawa Hiromichi
- Born: December 18, 1889; Aichi prefecture
- Died: June 11, 1966 (aged 76); Tokyo
- Occupations: Buddhist priest, businessman
- Known for: Contesting the Imperial Throne of Japan

Notes
- Some data has been translated from the Japanese Wikipedia article

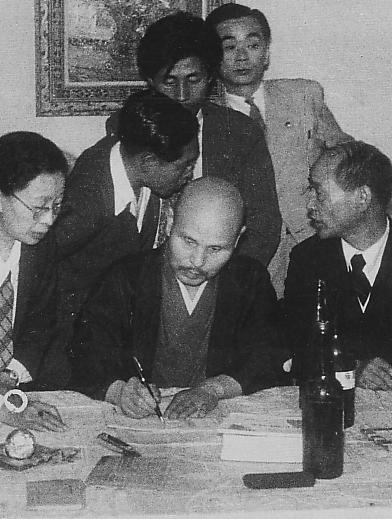
Photo of Kumazawa Hiromichi in 1947

Kumazawa Hiromichi (熊沢 寛道; December 18, 1889 – June 11, 1966), also known as the "Kumazawa emperor", was a Japanese businessman and Buddhist priest from Nagoya who publicly disputed the legitimacy of Emperor Hirohito's bloodline in the period shortly after the end of the Second World War. He claimed to be the 19th direct descendant of Emperor Go-Kameyama.

In 1946–1947, Hiromichi was only the first of roughly nineteen men who put themselves forward as Japan's rightful Emperor. As a direct descendant of the Southern Court emperors of the Nanboku-chō period, he argued that Emperor Hirohito was illegitimate. He pointed out that Hirohito's entire line is descended from the Northern Court emperors. He produced a koseki detailing his bloodline back to Emperor Go-Daigo in Yoshino, but his claims and rhetoric failed to inspire anything other than sympathy.

Hiromichi's claims ultimately remained unsubstantiated.
