= Eitoku =

Period of Japanese history (1381–1384)

Eitoku (永徳) was a Japanese era name (年号, nengō, lit. year name) of the Northern Court during the Era of Northern and Southern Courts after Kōryaku and before Shitoku. This period spanned the years from February 1381 to February 1384. The emperors in Kyoto were Emperor Go-En'yū (後円融天皇, Go-En'yū-tennō) and Emperor Go-Komatsu (後小松天皇, Go-Komatsu-tennō) The Southern Court rivals in Yoshino during this time-frame were Emperor Chōkei (長慶天皇, Chōkei-tennō) and Emperor Go-Kameyama (後亀山天皇, Go-Kameyama-tennō).

== Nanboku-chō overview ==
The Imperial seats during the Nanboku-chō period were in relatively close proximity, but geographically distinct. They were conventionally identified as: Northern capital : Kyoto; Southern capital : Yoshino.

During the Meiji period, an Imperial decree dated March 3, 1911 established that the legitimate reigning monarchs of this period were the direct descendants of Emperor Go-Daigo through Emperor Go-Murakami, whose Southern Court (南朝, nanchō) had been established in exile in Yoshino, near Nara.

Until the end of the Edo period, the militarily superior pretender-Emperors supported by the Ashikaga shogunate had been mistakenly incorporated in Imperial chronologies despite widespread recognition that the Imperial Regalia were not in their possession.

This illegitimate Northern Court (北朝, hokuchō) had been established in Kyoto by Ashikaga Takauji.

== Change of era ==
- 1381, also called Eitoku gannen (永徳元年): The new era name was created to mark an event or series of events. The previous era ended and the new one commenced in Kōryaku 3.

In this time frame, Kōwa (Muromachi period) (1381–1384) was the Southern Court equivalent nengō.

== Events of the Eitoku era ==
- 1381 (Eitoku 1, 3rd month): The emperor travels in procession to see Ashikaga Yoshimitsu at his palacial home in Muromachi.
- 1381 (Eitoku 1, 7th month): the kampaku Nijō Yoshimoto is elevated to the position of daijō daijin. Yoshimitsu is raised to the Imperial court position of nadaijin at the young age of 24. Yoshimoto and Yoshimitsu work well in harmony together.
- 1382 (Eitoku 2, 1st month): Yoshimitsu is raised to the court position of sadaijin, and several days later, he was named General of the Left (sadaisho). In this same period, Fujiwara no Sanetoki is elevated from the position of dainagon to nadaijin.
- 1383 (Eitoku 3): Emperor Go-Kameyama ascends southern throne.

== Notes ==
Preceded by Kōryaku	Era or nengō Eitoku; 1381–1384	Succeeded by Shitoku
