= Meitoku =

Period of Japanese history (1390–1394)

Meitoku (明徳) was a Japanese era name (年号, nengō; "year name") of the Northern Court during the Era of Northern and Southern Courts after Kōō and before Ōei. This period spanned the years from March 1390 to July 1394. After October 1392, Meitoku replaced the Southern Court's nengō (Genchū).

The emperor in Kyoto was Emperor Go-Komatsu (後小松天皇, Go-Komatsu-tennō) The Southern Court rival in Yoshino until 1392 was Emperor Go-Kameyama (後亀山天皇, Go-Kameyama-tennō).

== Nanboku-chō overview ==
The Imperial seats during the Nanboku-chō period were in relatively close proximity, but geographically distinct. They were conventionally identified as: Northern capital : Kyoto; Southern capital : Yoshino.

During the Meiji period, an Imperial decree dated March 3, 1911, established that the legitimate reigning monarchs of this period were the direct descendants of Emperor Go-Daigo through Emperor Go-Murakami, whose Southern Court (南朝, nanchō) had been established in exile in Yoshino, near Nara. Until the end of the Edo period, the militarily superior pretender-Emperors supported by the Ashikaga shogunate had been mistakenly incorporated in Imperial chronologies even though it was known that the Imperial Regalia were not in their possession. This illegitimate Northern Court (北朝, hokuchō) had been established in Kyoto by Ashikaga Takauji.

== Change of era ==
- 1390, also called Meitoku gannen (明徳元年): The new era name was created to mark an event or series of events. The previous era ended and the new one commenced after Kōō 2, 15th day of the 1st month.

In the initial years of this time frame, Genchū (1384–1392) was the Southern Court equivalent nengō.

In 1392, the two rival courts were said to be reunited in the era of Meitoku. Genchū 9 became Meitoku 3 when the two courts were reconciled.

== Events of Meitoku era ==
Ashikaga Yoshimitsu solidified the Bakufu's power by suppressing the power of the daimyōs and the shugo during the Toki Yasuyuki Rebellion, the Meitoku Rebellion and the Ōei Rebellion. In Meitoku 3/Genchū 9 (1392), the Northern Dynasty confiscated the Sacred Treasures which the Southern Court had possessed. With the abdication of Emperor Go-Kameyama, the dynasties, and eras, were consolidated. Hosokawa Yoriyuki, who had reinstated the Bakufu after it lost its standing in the Kōryaku Coup, died in Meiroku 3 (1392) in the Meiroku Rebellion. His younger brother Hosokawa Yoritomo replaced him as the person in control. In Meitoku 4 (1393), Shiba Yoshimasa became the person in control.

- 1390 (Meitoku 1): Kusunoki defeated; Yamana Ujikiyo chastises Tokinaga.
- 1391 (Meitoku 2): Yamana Ujikiyo attacks Kyoto, an escalation of the Meitoku War (1391–1394) in which Yoshimitsu tried to diminish the power of the Yamana clan which controlled 11 provinces
- 1392 (Meitoku 3): also known as Genchū 9: Northern and Southern courts reconciled under Go-Komatsu.

== Notes ==
Preceded by Kōō	Northern Era or nengō 1390–1393	Succeeded by Ōei
Preceded by Genchū	Southern Era or nengō 1393–1394	Succeeded by Ōei
