= Shitoku =

Period of Japanese history (1384–1387)

Shitoku (至徳) was a Japanese era name (年号, nengō; lit. year name) of the Northern Court during the Era of Northern and Southern Courts after Eitoku and before Kakei. This period spanned the years from February 1384 to August 1387. The emperor in Kyoto was Emperor Go-Komatsu (後小松天皇, Go-Komatsu-tennō) The Southern Court rival in Yoshino during this time-frame was Emperor Go-Kameyama (後亀山天皇, Go-Kameyama-tennō).

== Nanboku-chō overview ==
The Imperial seats during the Nanboku-chō period were in relatively close proximity, but geographically distinct. They were conventionally identified as: Northern capital : Kyoto; Southern capital : Yoshino.

During the Meiji period, an Imperial decree dated March 3, 1911 established that the legitimate reigning monarchs of this period were the direct descendants of Emperor Go-Daigo through Emperor Go-Murakami, whose Southern Court (南朝, nanchō) had been established in exile in Yoshino, near Nara.

Until the end of the Edo period, the militarily superior pretender-Emperors supported by the Ashikaga shogunate had been mistakenly incorporated in Imperial chronologies despite the undisputed fact that the Imperial Regalia were not in their possession.

This illegitimate Northern Court (北朝, hokuchō) had been established in Kyoto by Ashikaga Takauji.

Southern Court Equivalents: Genchū

== Change of era ==
- 1384, also called Shitoku gannen (至徳元年): The new era name was created to mark an event or series of events. The previous era ended and the new one commenced in Eitoku 4.

In this time frame, Genchū (1384–1393) was the Southern Court equivalent nengō.

== Events of the Shitoku era ==
- 1384 (Shitoku 1, 3rd month): Shōgun Ashikaga Yoshimitsu gave up his court position as General of the Left (sadaish).
- 1385 (Shitoku 2, 8th month): Yoshimistu made a public visit to Kasuga-taisha.
- 1385 (Shitoku 2): Southern army defeated at Koga.
- 1386 (Shitoku 3, 7th month): Yoshimitsu authorized the Five Mountain System for ranking state-sponsored Buddhist temples; and Nanzen-ji was ranked at the top and in a class of its own.
- 1387-89: Dissension is growing in Toki family of Mino.

== Notes ==
Preceded by Eitoku	Era or nengō Shitoku; 1384–1387	Succeeded by Kakei
