= Kakei =

Period of Japanese history (1387–1389)

Kakei (嘉慶) was a Japanese era name (年号, nengō; lit. year name) of the Northern Court during the Era of Northern and Southern Courts after Shitoku and before Kōō. This period spanned the years from August 1387 to February 1389. The emperor in Kyoto was Emperor Go-Komatsu (後小松天皇, Go-Komatsu-tennō) The Southern Court rival in Yoshino during this time-frame was Emperor Go-Kameyama (後亀山天皇, Go-Kameyama-tennō).

== Nanboku-chō overview ==
The Imperial seats during the Nanboku-chō period were in relatively close proximity, but geographically distinct. They were conventionally identified as: Northern capital : Kyoto; Southern capital : Yoshino.

During the Meiji period, an Imperial decree dated March 3, 1911 established that the legitimate reigning monarchs of this period were the direct descendants of Emperor Go-Daigo through Emperor Go-Murakami, whose Southern Court (南朝, nanchō) had been established in exile in Yoshino, near Nara.

Until the end of the Edo period, the militarily superior pretender-Emperors supported by the Ashikaga shogunate had been mistakenly incorporated in Imperial chronologies despite the undisputed fact that the Imperial Regalia were not in their possession.

This illegitimate Northern Court (北朝, hokuchō) had been established in Kyoto by Ashikaga Takauji.

== Change of era ==
- 1387, also called Kakei gannen (嘉慶元年): The new era name was created to mark an event or series of events. The previous era ended and the new one commenced in Shitoku 4.

In this time frame, Genchū (1384–1393) was the Southern Court equivalent nengō.

== Events of the Kakei era ==
- 1387 (Kakei 1, 1st month): Nijō Yoshimoto is removed from his powerful position as sesshō and daijō daijin.
- 1387 (Kakei 1, 2nd month): Konoe Kanetsugu is named sesshō.
- 1387-89 (Kakei 1–3): Dissension develops in Toki family of Mino.
- 1388 (Kakei 2, 3rd month): The sesshō Konoe Kanetsugu dies at age 29; and Yoshimoto re-assumes this role in the following month.
- 1388 (Kakei 2, 6th month): Yoshitomo dies at age 69; and his son Nijō Morotsugu succeeds him with the title of kampaku.
- 1389 -- Yoshimitsu pacifies Kyūshū and distributes lands; Yoshimitsu opposed by Kamakura kanrei Ashikaga Ujimitsu.

== Notes ==
Preceded by Shitoku	Era or nengō Kakei; 1387–1389	Succeeded by Kōō
