= Kōō =

Period of Japanese history (1389–1390)

Kōō (康応), also romanized as Kō-ō, was a Japanese era name (年号, nengō, lit. year name) of the Northern Court during the Era of Northern and Southern Courts after Kakei and before Meitoku. This period spanned the years from February 1389 to March 1390. The emperor in Kyoto was Emperor Go-Komatsu (後小松天皇, Go-Komatsu-tennō) The Southern Court rival in Yoshino during this time-frame was Emperor Go-Kameyama (後亀山天皇, Go-Kameyama-tennō).

== Nanboku-chō overview ==
The Imperial seats during the Nanboku-chō period were in relatively close proximity, but geographically distinct. They were conventionally identified as: Northern capital : Kyoto; Southern capital : Yoshino.

This illegitimate Northern Court (北朝, hokuchō) was established in Kyoto by Ashikaga Takauji in 1336. Until the end of the Edo period, the militarily superior pretender-Emperors supported by the Ashikaga shogunate were incorporated in Imperial chronologies, even though the Imperial Regalia were never in their possession.

During the Meiji period, an Imperial decree dated March 3, 1911 established that the legitimate reigning monarchs of this period were the direct descendants of Emperor Go-Daigo through Emperor Go-Murakami, whose Southern Court (南朝, nanchō) had been established in exile in Yoshino, near Nara.

== Change of era ==
- 1389, also called Kōō gannen (康応元年): The new era name was created to mark an event or series of events. The previous era ended and the new one commenced in Kakei 3.

In this time frame, Genchū (1384–1393) was the Southern Court equivalent nengō.

== Events of the Kōō era ==
- 1389 (Kōō 1): Dissension continues in Toki family in Mino.
- 1389 (Kōō 1): Yoshimitsu pacifies Kyūshū and distributes lands; Yoshimitsu opposed by Kamakura kanrei Ashikaga Ujimitsu.
- 1389 (Kōō 1, 7th month): The udaijin Saioinji Sanetoshi died at the age of 56.
- 1390 (Kōō 2): Kusunoki defeated; Yamana Ujikiyo chastises Tokinaga.

== Notes ==
Preceded by Kakei	Era or nengō Kōō; 1389–1390	Succeeded by Meitoku
