= Emperor Go-En'yū =

Japanese Northern Emperor from 1371 to 1382

Emperor Go-En'yū 後円融天皇
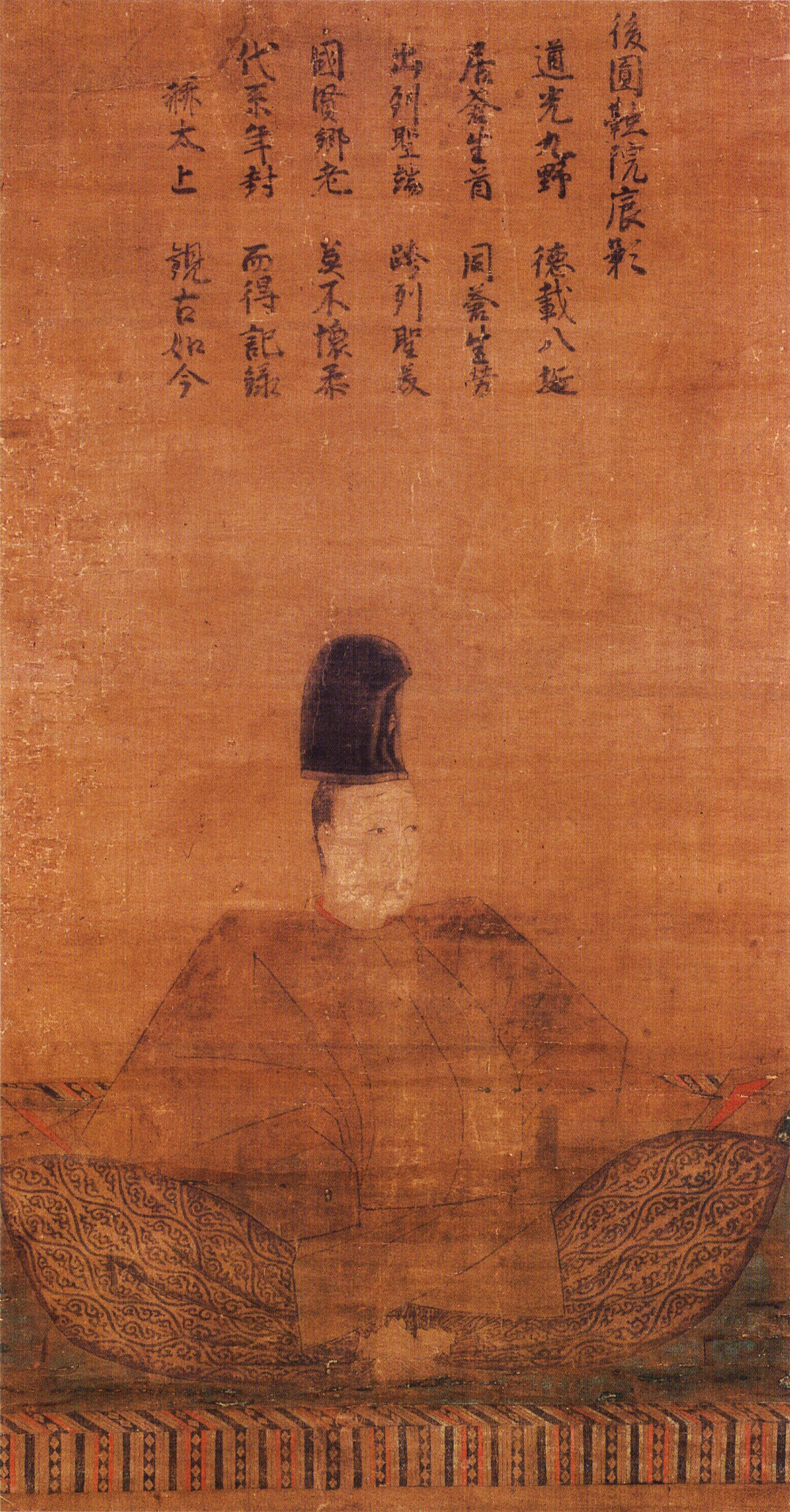

5th Northern Emperor
- Reign: 9 April 1371 – 24 May 1382
- Enthronement: 30 January 1375
- Predecessor: Go-Kōgon
- Successor: Go-Komatsu
- Born: 11 January 1359
- Died: 6 June 1393 (aged 34)
- Burial: Fukakusa no Kita no Misasagi (深草北陵), Kyoto
- Spouse: Sanjō Itsuko
- Issue: Emperor Go-Komatsu; Princess Keiko; Prince Dōchō
Posthumous name
- Tsuigō: Emperor Go-En'yū (後円融院 or 後円融天皇)
- House: Imperial House of Japan
- Father: Emperor Go-Kōgon
- Mother: Fujiwara no Nakako
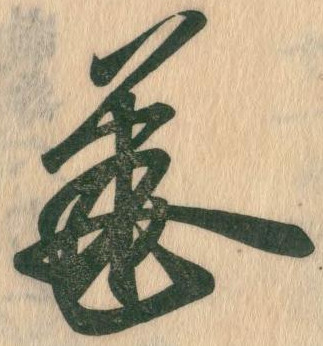
- Signature

Emperor Go-En'yū (後円融天皇, Go-En'yū-tennō) (11 January 1359 – 6 June 1393) was the 5th of the Emperors of Northern Court during the period of two courts in Japan. According to pre-Meiji scholars, his reign spanned the years from 1371 through 1382.

This Nanboku-chō "sovereign" was named after the 10th century Emperor En'yū and go- (後), translates literally as "later;" and thus, he may be called the "Later Emperor En'yū", or, in some older sources, may be identified as "Emperor En'yū, the second", or as "Emperor En'yū II."

== Genealogy ==
His personal name was Ohito (緒仁).

He was the second son of the fourth Northern Pretender Emperor Go-Kōgon. His mother was Fujiwara no Nakako (藤原仲子), Hirohashi Kanetsuna's daughter.

- Consort: Sanjō Itsuko (三条 厳子) (also known as Fujiwara no Izuko). Sanjō Kintada's daughter.
  - First son: Imperial Prince Motohito (幹仁親王) later Emperor Go-Komatsu
  - First daughter: Imperial Princess Keiko (1381–1399; 珪子内親王)
- Lady-in-waiting Fujiwara no Imako (藤原今子), Shijō Takasato's daughter
  - Second son: Imperial Prince Priest Dōchō (1378–1446; 道朝法親王)
- Naishi: Ogimachi Sanjo Sanetoshi's daughter
- Naishi: Azechi-no-tsubone, Tachibana Tomoshige's daughter
- unknown
  - daughter: (d.1391)
  - daughter: ???
  - son: ???

== Events of Go-En'yū's life ==
In his own lifetime, Go-En'yū and those around him believed that he occupied the Chrysanthemum Throne from 9 April 1371 to 24 May 1382.

In 1371, by Imperial Proclamation, he received the rank of shinnō (親王), or Imperial Prince (and potential heir). Immediately afterwards, he became emperor upon the abdication of his father, Emperor Go-Kōgon. There was said to be a disagreement between Go-Kōgon and the retired Northern Emperor Emperor Sukō over the Crown Prince. With the support of Hosokawa Yoriyuki, who controlled the Bakufu, Go-Kōgon's son became the Northern Emperor.

Until 1374, Go-Kōgon ruled as cloistered emperor. In 1368, Ashikaga Yoshimitsu was named shōgun, and with his guardianship, the Imperial Court was stabilized. In 1382, upon abdicating to Emperor Go-Komatsu, his cloistered rule began. Having no actual power, he rebelled, attempting suicide and accusing Ashikaga Yoshimitsu and his consort Itsuko of adultery.

In 1392, peace with the Southern Court being concluded, the Period of the Northern and Southern Courts came to an end. On 6 June 1393, Go-En'yū died. He is enshrined with other emperors at the imperial tomb called Fukakusa no kita no misasagi (深草北陵) in Fushimi-ku, Kyoto.

== Eras of Go-En'yū's reign ==
The years of Go-En'yū's Nanboku-chō reign are more specifically identified by more than one era name or nengō.

Nanboku-chō Southern court

- Eras as reckoned by legitimate Court (as determined by Meiji rescript)
  - Kentoku (1370–1372)
  - Benchū (1372–1375)
  - Tenju (1375–1381)
  - Kōwa (1381–1384)

Nanboku-chō Northern court

- Eras as reckoned by pretender Court (as determined by Meiji rescript)
  - Ōan (1368–1375)
  - Eiwa (1375–1379)
  - Kōryaku (1379–1381)
  - Eitoku (1381–1384)

== Southern Court rivals ==
- Emperor Chōkei

== See also ==
- Emperor of Japan
- List of Emperors of Japan
- Imperial cult

== Notes ==
Japanese Imperial kamon — a stylized chrysanthemum blossom

Regnal titles
Preceded by Emperor Go-Kōgon	Northern Emperor; 1371–1382	Succeeded by Emperor Go-Komatsu
