= Emperor Go-Komatsu =

Emperor of Japan from 1392 to 1412

Emperor Go-Komatsu 後小松天皇
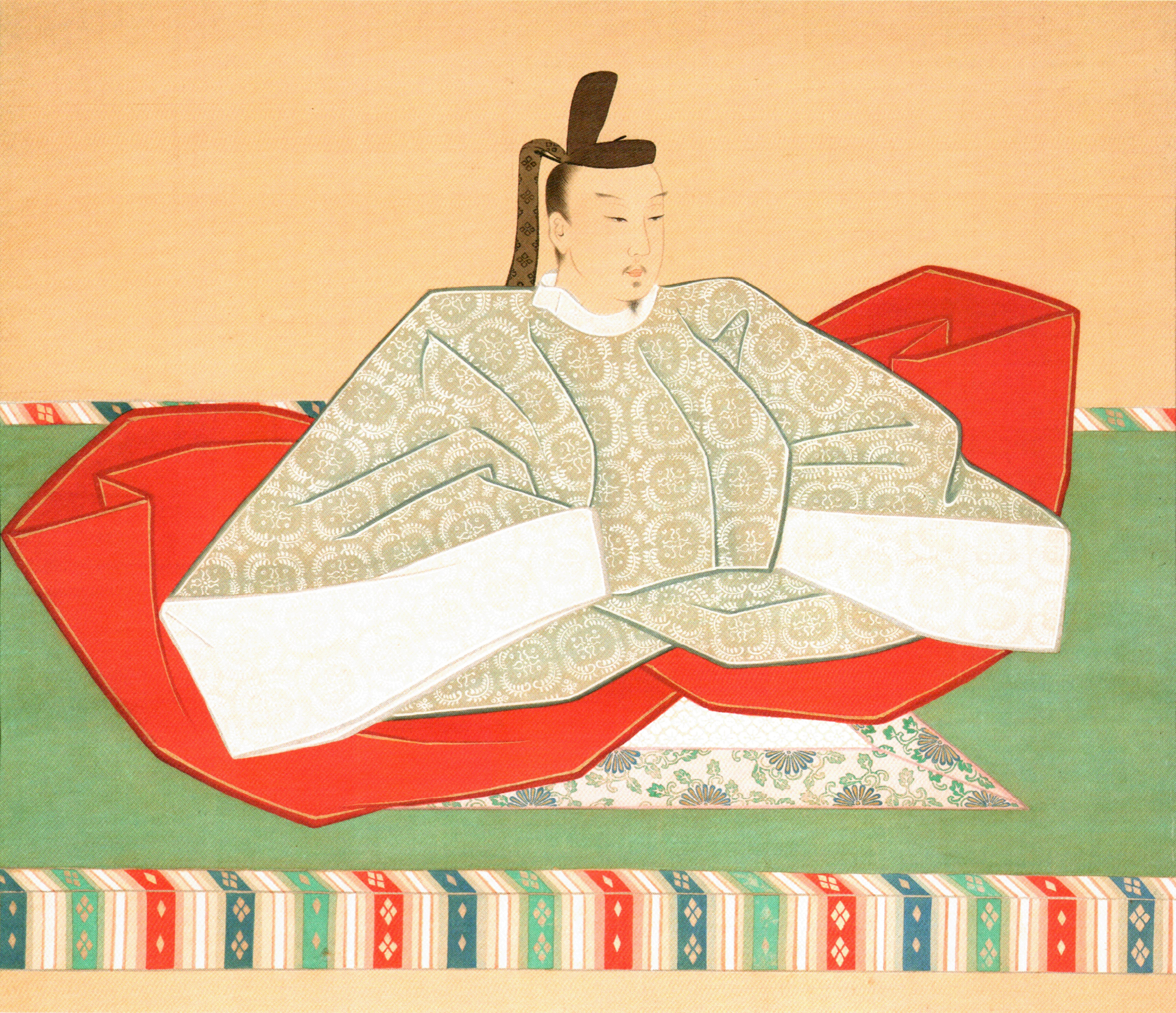
- Portrait from the mid-Edo period

Emperor of Japan
- Reign: 19 November 1392 – 5 October 1412
- Predecessor: Go-Kameyama
- Successor: Shōkō
- Shōgun: Ashikaga Yoshimitsu; Ashikaga Yoshimochi

6th Northern Emperor
- Reign: 24 May 1382 – 19 November 1392
- Enthronement: 31 January 1383
- Predecessor: Go-En'yū
- Successor: None
- Born: Motohito (幹仁); 1 August 1377
- Died: 1 December 1433 (aged 56)
- Burial: Fukakusa no kita no Misasagi (深草北陵) (Kyoto)
- Issue more...: Ikkyū Sōjun; Emperor Shōkō
Posthumous name
- Tsuigō: Emperor Go-Komatsu (後小松院 or 後小松天皇)
- House: Imperial House of Japan
- Father: Emperor Go-En'yū
- Mother: Sanjō Izuko
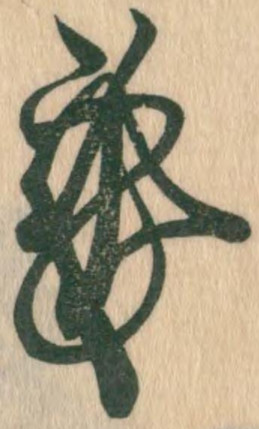
- Signature

Emperor Go-Komatsu (後小松天皇, Go-Komatsu-tennō; 1 August 1377 – 1 December 1433) was the 100th emperor of Japan, according to the traditional order of succession, and the sixth and final Emperor of the Northern Court.

He is officially considered to have been the Northern pretender from 24 May 1382 to 21 October 1392, when upon Emperor Go-Kameyama's abdication, Go-Komatsu is understood to have been a legitimate emperor (the 100th sovereign) from that date. In 1392, following the post-Nanboku-chō unification of the two formerly contending courts, the Southern Emperor Emperor Go-Kameyama reached an agreement with Go-Komatsu to alternate control of the throne between the Northern and Southern courts on a ten-year plan which effectively signaled the end of the southern court's claims to sovereignty. However, Go-Komatsu reneged, not only ruling for 20 years until his own abdication on 5 October 1412, but was succeeded by his own son, rather than by one from the former Southern Court. According to pre-Meiji scholars, Go-Komatsu's reign as a legitimate emperor spanned the years from 1392 through 1412. The present Japanese Imperial Family is descended from the three Northern Court emperors.

This Nanboku-chō "sovereign" was named after the 9th-century Emperor Kōkō, and go- (後), translates literally as "later." Jien's Gukanshō explains that Kōkō was called "the Emperor of Komatsu". The 14th-century pretender and emperor may be called the "later Emperor Kōkō" or the "later Emperor Komatsu". The Japanese word go has also been translated to mean the "second one;" and in some older sources, this would-be emperor may be identified as "Komatsu, the second", or as "Komatsu II."

== Genealogy ==
Before his accession to the Chrysanthemum Throne, his personal name (his imina) was Motohito-shinnō (幹仁親王).

Go-Komatsu was the first son of Emperor Go-En'yū. His mother was Tsūyōmonin no Itsuko (通陽門院厳子), daughter of the Lord Keeper of the Privy Seal Sanjō Kimitada (三条公忠).

- Consort: Hinonishi Motoko (日野西資子, 1384–1440) later Kohan’mon-in (光範門院), Hinonishi Sukekuni's daughter
  - First son: Imperial Prince Mihito (1401–1428実仁親王) later Emperor Shōkō
  - Second son: Prince Ogawa (1404–1425; 小川宮), Emperor Shōkō's crown prince
  - First daughter: Princess Riei (理永女王; 1406–1447)
- Lady-in-waiting: Kanrouji Tsuneko (甘露寺経子), Kanrouji Kanenaga's daughter
- Naishi: Hinonishi Sukekuni's daughter
- Naishi: Shirakawa Suketada's daughter
- Naishi: Kohyōe-no-Tsubone (小兵衛局)
  - daughter: (b. 1412)
- Naishi: Unknown (daughter of a retainer from the Southern Court)
  - Ikkyū Sōjun

He was named after Emperor Kōkō, who had the alternate name Komatsu, because they both returned the throne to their families, in the case of Emperor Go-Komatsu, by defeating his Southern Court rivals, and in the case of Emperor Kōkō, by succeeding his elder brother's grandson, Emperor Yōzei.

== Events of Go-Komatsu's life ==
In his own lifetime, Go-Komatsu and those around him believed that he occupied the Chrysanthemum Throne from 24 May 1382 until 1412.

He was raised in the turbulent Nanboku-chō period of rival northern and southern courts in the mansion of Hino Sukenori (日野西資教). He succeeded as Northern Emperor upon the abdication of his father, the Northern Pretender Emperor Go-En'yū. With the help of Ashikaga Yoshimitsu, his father ruled as Cloistered Emperor.

In 1392, an envoy from the Ashikaga Shogunate managed to persuade Emperor Go-Kameyama to convey the Imperial Regalia to Go-Komatsu, which meant that he ceded the Chrysanthemum Throne to his former rival. Go-Komatsu received the succession (senso); and he is understood to have formally acceded to the legitimate Imperial power and position (sokui). In the peace at that time, it was agreed that the northern and southern courts would alternate. However, in 1412, when Emperor Go-Komatsu abdicated, the agreement was thrown away, and, instead, he was succeeded by his son, Emperor Shōkō, and all subsequent Emperors were descended from the Northern Court. Until 1911, the Northern Court Emperors were considered the legitimate ones, and the Southern Court to be illegitimate. However, now the Southern Court is considered to have been legitimate, primarily because they retained the three sacred treasures, and thus, Emperor Go-Komatsu is not considered to have been legitimate for the first 10 years of his reign.

He is enshrined with other emperors at the imperial tomb called Fukakusa no kita no misasagi (深草北陵) in Fushimi-ku, Kyoto.

=== Kugyō ===
Kugyō (公卿) is a collective term for the very few most powerful men attached to the court of the Emperor of Japan in pre-Meiji eras. Even during those years in which the court's actual influence outside the palace walls was minimal, the hierarchic organization persisted.

In general, this elite group included only three to four men at a time. These were hereditary courtiers whose experience and background would have brought them to the pinnacle of a life's career. During Go-Komatsu's reign, this apex of the Daijō-kan included:

- Sadaijin
- Udaijin
- Nadaijin
- Dainagon

== Eras of Go-Komatsu's reign ==
The years of Go-Komatsu's Nanboku-chō and post-Nanboku-chō reign are more specifically identified by more than one era name or nengō.

Nanboku-chō northern court

- Eras as reckoned by legitimate Court (as determined by Meiji rescript)
  - Eitoku (1381–1384)
  - Shitoku (1384–1387)
  - Kakei (1387–1389)
  - Kōō (1389–1393)

Nanboku-chō southern court

- Eras as reckoned by pretender Court (as determined by Meiji rescript)
  - Kōwa (1381–1384)
  - Genchū (1384–1390)
  - Meitoku (1390–1393)‡

Post-Nanboku-chō court

- Eras merged as Meitoku 3 replaced Genchū 9 as Go-Kameyama abdicated.
  - Meitoku (1393–1394)‡
  - Ōei (1394–1428)

== Southern Court rivals ==
- Chōkei
- Go-Kameyama

== See also ==
- List of Emperors of Japan
- Imperial cult

== Notes ==
Japanese Imperial kamon — a stylized chrysanthemum blossom

Regnal titles
Preceded by Emperor Go-En'yū	Northern Emperor; 1382–1392	Succeeded by –
Preceded by Emperor Go-Kameyama	Emperor of Japan: Go-Komatsu; 1392–1412	Succeeded by Emperor Shōkō
