= Genchū =

Period of Japanese history (1384–1392)

Genchū (元中) was a Japanese era of the Southern Court during the Era of Northern and Southern Courts lasting from April 1384 to October 1392. The reigning Emperors were Go-Kameyama in the south and Go-Komatsu in the north.

== Nanboku-chō overview ==
The Imperial seats during the Nanboku-chō period were in relatively close proximity, but geographically distinct. They were conventionally identified as: Northern capital: Kyoto; Southern capital: Yoshino.

During the Meiji period, an Imperial decree dated March 3, 1911, established that the legitimate reigning monarchs of this period were the direct descendants of Emperor Go-Daigo through Emperor Go-Murakami, whose Southern Court (南朝, nanchō) had been established in exile in Yoshino, near Nara.

Until the end of the Edo period, the militarily superior pretender-Emperors supported by the Ashikaga shogunate had been mistakenly incorporated in Imperial chronologies despite the undisputed fact that the Imperial Regalia were not in their possession.

This illegitimate Northern Court (北朝, hokuchō) had been established in Kyoto by Ashikaga Takauji.

== Northern Court Equivalents ==
- Shitoku
- Kakei
- Kōō
- Meitoku – Genchū became Meitoku 3 when the Courts were united

== Notes ==
Preceded by Kōwa	Era or nengō Genchū; 1384–1392	Succeeded by Meitoku
