= Emperor Go-Kameyama =

Emperor of Japan from 1383 to 1392

Emperor Go-Kameyama 後亀山天皇
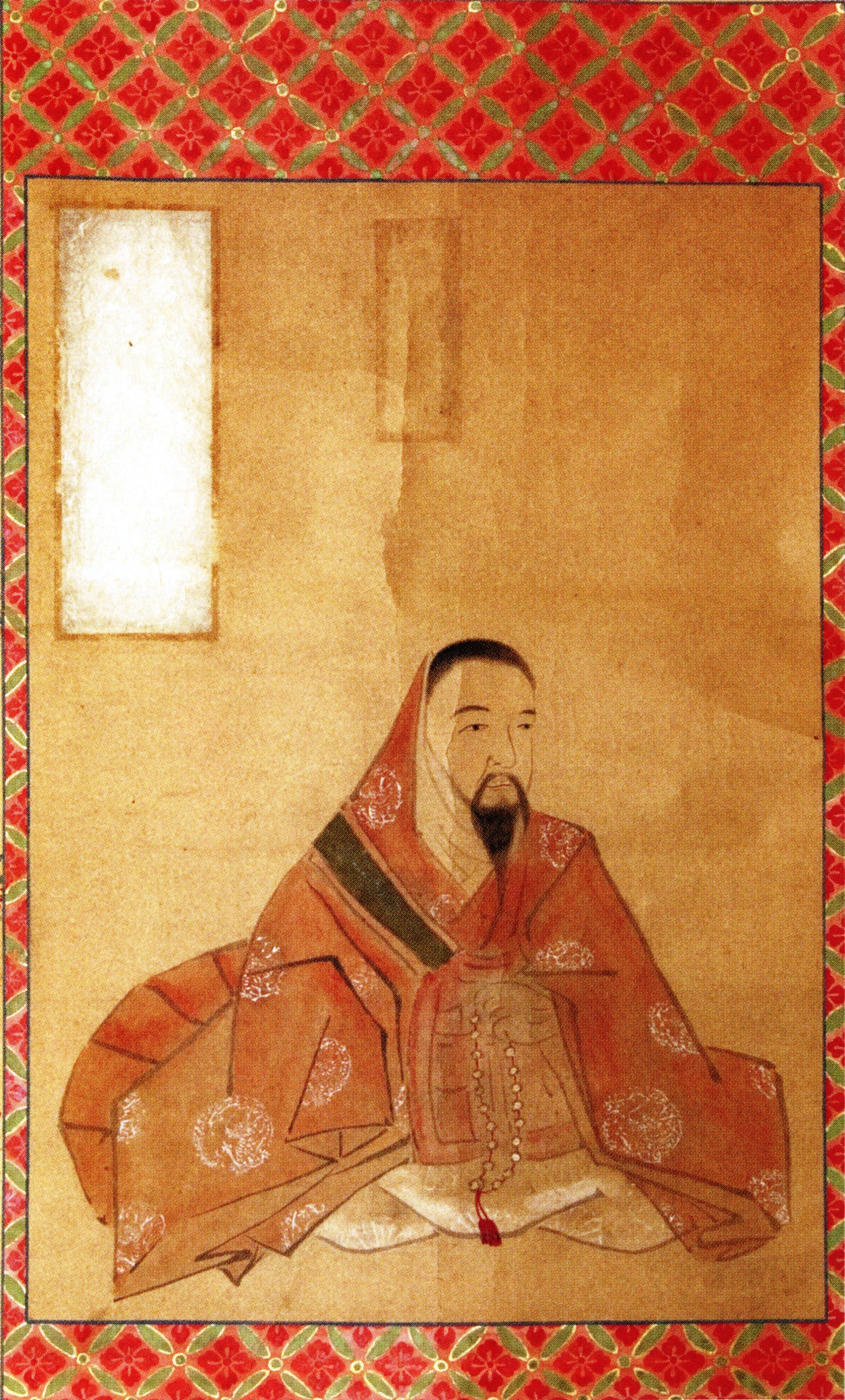

Emperor of Japan
- Reign: 1383 – November 19, 1392
- Predecessor: Chōkei
- Successor: Go-Komatsu
- Shōgun: Ashikaga Yoshimitsu
- Born: Hironari (熙成); 1347
- Died: May 10, 1424 (aged 76–77); Daikaku-ji
- Burial: Saga no Ogura no Misasagi (嵯峨小倉陵) (Yamashiro)
- Spouse: Kitabatake Nobuko
- Issue: See below
Posthumous name
- Tsuigō: Emperor Go-Kameyama (後亀山院 or 後亀山天皇)
- House: Imperial House of Japan
- Father: Emperor Go-Murakami
- Mother: Kaki Mon'in

Emperor Go-Kameyama (後亀山天皇, Go-Kameyama Tennō) (c. 1347 – May 10, 1424) was the 99th emperor of Japan, according to the traditional order of succession. He ruled from 1383 to October 21, 1392, becoming the last Emperor of the Southern Court. His personal name was Hironari (熙成).

This 14th century sovereign was named after the 13th century Emperor Kameyama and go- (後), translates literally as "later"; and thus, he could be called the "Later Emperor Kameyama". The Japanese word "go" has also been translated to mean the "second one"; and in some older sources, this emperor may be identified as "Kameyama, the second" or as "Kameyama II".

== Genealogy ==
He was the second son of Emperor Go-Murakami. His mother was Fujiwara Katsuko (藤原勝子), better known as Kaki Mon'in.

Little is known of his empress or other consorts. Imperial Prince Tsuneatsu (恒敦) is believed to be his son.

- Empress: Minamoto (Kitabatake) Nobuko, Kitabatake Akinobu's daughter
  - Third Son: Imperial Prince Yoshiyasu (良泰親王; 1370–1443)
  - Imperial Prince Priest Gyōgo (行悟法親王; 1377–1406)
  - First Daughter: Imperial Princess Yasuko (泰子内親王) married Nijō Fuyuzane
- Consort: Fujiwara (Nijo) Noriko, Nijo Norimoto's daughter
  - First Son: Imperial Prince Tokiyasu (世泰親王, 1360–1377)
- Lady-in-waiting: Fujiwara (Hino) Kuniko, Hino Kunimitsu's daughter
  - Second Son: Imperial Prince Moroyasu (師泰親王; 1362–1423)
  - Shino (真阿, 1374–1440)
- Mother unknown
  - Imperial Prince Tsuneatsu (恒敦, d.1422), First Head of Ogawa clan.
  - Sonkoku (琮頊, d.1448)

== Life ==
Go-Kameyama acceded to the throne during the turbulent Nanboku-chō period during which rival claimants to the Chrysanthemum Throne gathered supporters around them in what were known as the Northern court and the Southern Court. Go-Kameyama became Emperor in what was called the Southern court when Emperor Chōkei abdicated in 1383. On October 15, 1392, at the insistence of the peace faction amongst his own courtiers, he applied to Ashikaga Yoshimitsu for peace; and he subsequently returned to the capital where he did hand over the Sacred Treasures to his Northern Court rival. In doing so, Go-Kameyama was understood to have abdicated.

By the conditions of the peace treaty, the Northern Court and the Southern Court were supposed to alternate control of the throne. However, this was thrown out in 1412 as Emperor Go-Komatsu reneged on the treaty by abdicating in favour of his own son. Henceforth, no Southern Court claimant ever sat on the Chrysthansemum Throne again. Still, since 1911, the Japanese government has declared the southern claimants were actually the rightful emperors despite the fact that all subsequent emperors including the then-Emperor Meiji were descended from the Northern Court, reasoning the Southern Court retained possession of the three sacred treasures, thus converting the emperors of the former Northern court into mere pretenders.

Following his abdication, he went into seclusion; but, in 1410, he returned to Yoshino.

The Imperial Household Agency recognizes Saga no ogura no misasagi (嵯峨小倉陵) in Ukyō-ku, Kyoto as his tomb.

=== Kugyō ===
Kugyō (公卿) is a collective term for the very few most powerful men attached to the court of the Emperor of Japan in pre-Meiji eras. Even during those years in which the court's actual influence outside the palace walls was minimal, the hierarchic organization persisted.

In general, this elite group included only three to four men at a time. These were hereditary courtiers whose experience and background would have brought them to the pinnacle of a life's career. During Go-Kameyama's reign, this apex of the Daijō-kan included:

- Sadaijin
- Udaijin
- Nadaijin
- Dainagon

== Eras of Go-Kameyama's reign ==
The years of Go-Kameyama's reign are more specifically identified by more than one era name or nengō.

Nanboku-chō southern court

- Eras as reckoned by legitimate Court (as determined by Meiji rescript)
  - Kōwa (1381–1384)
  - Genchū (1384–1393)

Nanboku-chō northern court

- Eras as reckoned by pretender Court (as determined by Meiji rescript)
  - Eitoku (1381–1384)
  - Shitoku (1384–1387)
  - Kakei (1387–1389)
  - Kōō (1389–1390)
  - Meitoku (1390–1393)‡

Post-Nanboku-chō reunified court

- Eras merged as Meitoku 3 replaced Genchū 9 as Go-Kameyama abdicated.
  - Meitoku (1393–1394)‡

== Works cited ==
- Hamaguchi, Hiroaki (1983). "Kaki Mon'in". Nihon Koten Bungaku Daijiten 日本古典文学大辞典 (in Japanese). Vol. 1. Tokyo: Iwanami Shoten. p. 588. OCLC 11917421.
- Ponsonby-Fane, Richard Arthur Brabazon. (1959). The Imperial House of Japan. Kyoto: Ponsonby Memorial Society. OCLC 194887
- Titsingh, Isaac, ed. (1834). [Siyun-sai Rin-siyo/Hayashi Gahō, 1652], Nipon o daï itsi ran; ou, Annales des empereurs du Japon. Paris: Oriental Translation Fund of Great Britain and Ireland.

== See also ==
- Emperor of Japan
- List of Emperors of Japan
- Imperial cult

Regnal titles
| Preceded by Emperor Chōkei | Emperor of Japan: Go-Kameyama; 1383–1392 | Succeeded by Emperor Go-Komatsu |
