= Southern Court =

Legitimate emperors during the Nanboku-chō period of Japan (1336–1392)

Southern Court 南朝 Nanchō
- 1338–1392
- Nishiki No Mihata Imperial Seal
- Capital: Yoshino, Yoshino Province; 34°23′46″N 135°51′27″E
- Common languages: Late Middle Japanese
- Religion: Shinbutsu shūgō
- Government: Absolute monarchy
- Emperor
  - 1336–1339: Go-Daigo
  - 1339–1368: Go-Murakami
  - 1368–1383: Chōkei
  - 1383–1392: Go-Kameyama
- History
  - Fall of Kyoto: February 23 1338
  - Re-unification of Imperial courts: August 11 1392
Preceded by
Kenmu Restoration
Succeeded by
Imperial House of Japan
Later Southern Court
Ashikaga shogunate

The Southern Court (南朝, Nanchō) were a set of four emperors (Emperor Go-Daigo and his line) whose claims to sovereignty during the Nanboku-chō period spanning from 1336 through 1392 were usurped by the Northern Court. This period ended with the Southern Court definitively losing the war, and they were forced to completely submit sovereignty to the Northern Court. This had the result that, while later Japanese sovereigns were descended from the Northern Court, posterity assigns sole legitimacy during this period to the Southern Court.

The Southern descendants are also known as the "junior line" and the Daikakuji line (大覚寺統, Daikakuji-tō), Daikaku-ji being the cloistered home of Go-Uda, a Southern ruler. Because it was based in Yoshino, Nara, it is also called the Yoshino court (吉野朝廷, Yoshino chōtei).

== Origin ==
The Imperial seats during the Nanboku-chō period were in relatively close proximity, but geographically distinct. They were conventionally identified as: Northern capital: Kyoto; Southern capital: Yoshino.

The genesis of the Southern Court go back to Emperor Go-Saga, who reigned from 1242 through 1246. Go-Saga was succeeded by two of his sons, Emperor Go-Fukakusa and Emperor Kameyama, who took turns on the throne. This was because on his death bed in 1272, Go-Saga had insisted that his sons adopt a plan in which future emperors from the two fraternal lines would ascend the throne in alternating succession. This plan proved to be unworkable, resulting in two rival factions, the Daikaku-Ji line and the Jimyoin-to line.

When the Daikaku-Ji emperor Go-Daigo rebelled against the Kamakura Shogunate, The Shogun installed the jimyoin-to line emperor Kogon as a puppet ruler. After the Shogunate was overthrown, Go-Daigo started the Kenmu Restoration.

== Nanboku-Cho Overview ==
He started the Kenmu Restoration to restore the power to the Imperial Court. By doing this, he wanted the emperor to have all the power. Due to it, he refused to grant Ashikaga Takauji the title of Shogun. When Takauji went without the Emperor's permission to suppress a rebellion by the recently ousted Hojo clan, Go Daigo ordered Takauji to come back, but Takauji, realizing that the Samurai class were with him, marched on to Kyoto directly. He seized Kyoto and installed Komyo, son of Kogon and of the Jimyoin-to line as the legitimate emperor, and by doing so Komyo granted him the title of Shogun. Kōmyo's family thus formed an alternate Imperial Court in Kyoto, which came to be called the Northern Court because its seat was in a location north of its rival. His capture of Kyoto forced Go Daigo and the southern line to retreat to the mountains of Yoshino, where he formed his government in exile. This starts the Nanboku-Cho period.

The Northern Court supported by the Ashikaga shoguns was rivaled by the Southern Court of Go-Daigo and his descendants. This came to be called the Southern Court because its seat was in a location south of its rival. Although the precise location of the emperors' seat did change, it was often identified as simply Yoshino.

== Defeat and loss of power ==
By 1392, the southern court was on the verge of collapse and its armies had been completely annihilated and its economic base was dwindling. Seeing this, the third Ashikaga shogun Ashikaga Yoshimitsu brokered the Meitoku Accord. According to it, the two lines must take turns in rulling just like the original agreement in 1272. Having no other option, Go-Kameyama abdicates and gives the throne to northern line Emperor Go Komatsu and gives the imperial regalia to the northern line. This effectively ends the Nanboku-Cho period. But Go-Komatsu didn't keep up his promise, as after he abdicated he passed the throne to his son instead of a southern line descendent but the southern court was too weak by this point to do anything.

== Kumazawa Hiromichi ==
One Southern Court descendant, Kumazawa Hiromichi, declared himself to be Japan's rightful Emperor in the days after the end of the Second World War. He claimed that Emperor Hirohito was a fraud, arguing that Hirohito's entire line is descended from the Northern Court. Despite this, he was not arrested for lèse-majesté, even when donning the Imperial Crest. He could and did produce a koseki detailing his bloodline back to Go-Daigo in Yoshino, but his claims and rhetoric failed to inspire anything other than sympathy.

== Southern Court emperors ==
These are the Nanchō or Southern Court emperors:

- Emperor Go-Daigo 1336–1339.
- Emperor Go-Murakami 1339–1368.
- Emperor Chōkei 1368–1383.
- Emperor Go-Kameyama 1383–1392.
