= Northern Court =

Set of pretenders to the Japanese throne during the Nanboku-chō period (1336–92)

Northern Court 北朝 Hokuchō
- 1331/1336–1392
- Imperial Seal
- Capital: Heian-kyō
- Common languages: Late Middle Japanese
- Religion: Shinbutsu shūgō
- Government: Monarchy
- Emperor
  - 1331–1333: Kōgon
  - 1336–1348: Kōmyō
  - 1348–1351: Sukō
  - 1352–1371: Go-Kōgon
  - 1371–1382: Go-En'yū
  - 1382–1392/1412: Go-Komatsu
- History
  - Established: 1331/1336
  - Re-unification of Imperial courts: August 11 1392
Preceded by	Succeeded by
Kenmu Restoration	Imperial House of Japan; Ashikaga shogunate

The Northern Court (北朝, hokuchō), also known as the Ashikaga Pretenders or Northern Pretenders, were a set of six pretenders to the throne of Japan during the Nanboku-chō period from 1336 through 1392. Even though the present Imperial House of Japan is descended from the Northern Court emperors, the Southern Court is considered the legitimate line, with the argument being that it was the Southern court which possessed the Imperial Regalia, which was later handed over to the Northern court, thus making Emperor Go-Komatsu the 100th Emperor of Japan. In 1911, Emperor Meiji passed an edict which made the Southern line the legitimate one. Before this, pre-Meiji scholars considered the Northern line as the legitimate line.

The Northern dynasty is also referred to as the "senior line" or the Jimyōin line (持明院統, Jimyōin-tō); Jimyō-in was a temple and retirement residence of this line's emperors Go-Fukakusa and Fushimi.

== Nanboku-chō overview ==
The Imperial seats during the Nanboku-chō period were in relatively close proximity, but geographically distinct. They were conventionally identified as: Northern capital: Kyoto; Southern capital: Yoshino.

The origins of the Northern Court go back to Emperor Go-Saga, who reigned from 1242 through 1246. Go-Saga was succeeded in turn by two of his sons, Emperor Go-Fukakusa and Emperor Kameyama. On his death bed in 1272, Go-Saga insisted that his sons adopt a plan in which future emperors from the two fraternal lines would ascend the throne in alternating succession. This plan proved to be unworkable, resulting in two rival factions, the Daikaku-Ji line and the Jimyoin-to line.

When the Daikaku-Ji emperor Go-Daigo rebelled against the Kamakura Shogunate, The Shogun installed the jimyoin-to line emperor Kogon as a puppet ruler. After the Shogunate was overthrown, Go-Daigo started the Kenmu Restoration.

He started the Kenmu Restoration to restore the power to the Imperial Court. By doing this, he wanted the emperor to have all the power. Due to it, he refused to grant Ashikaga Takauji the title of Shogun. When Takauji went without the Emperor's permission to suppress a rebellion by the recently ousted Hojo clan, Go Daigo ordered Takauji to come back, but Takauji, realizing that the Samurai class were with him, marched on to Kyoto directly. He seized Kyoto and installed Komyo, son of Kogon and of the Jimyoin-to line as the legitimate emperor, and by doing so Komyo granted him the title of Shogun. Kōmyo's family thus formed an alternate Imperial Court in Kyoto, which came to be called the Northern Court because its seat was in a location north of its rival. His capture of Kyoto forced Go Daigo and the southern line to retreat to the mountains of Yoshino, where he formed his government in exile. This starts the Nanboku-Cho period.

The Northern Court supported by the Ashikaga shoguns was rivaled by the Southern Court of Go-Daigo and his descendants. This came to be called the Southern Court because its seat was in a location south of its rival. Although the precise location of the emperors' seat did change, it was often identified as simply Yoshino.

== Meitoku Accords and Abdication Of Go-Kameyama ==
By 1392, the southern court was on the verge of collapse and its armies had been completely annihilated and its economic base was dwindling. Seeing this, the third Ashikaga shogun Ashikaga Yoshimitsu brokered the Meitoku Accord. According to it, the two lines must take turns in rulling just like the original agreement in 1272. Having no other option, Go-Kameyama abdicates and gives the throne to northern line Emperor Go Komatsu and gives the imperial regalia to the northern line. This effectively ends the Nanboku-Cho period. But Go-Komatsu didn't keep up his promise, as after he abdicated he passed the throne to his son instead of a southern line descendent but the southern court was too weak by this point to do anything.

== Legitimacy of the Northern Court ==
The Northern Court was under the power of the Ashikaga shoguns and had little real independence. Partly because of this, since the 19th century, the Emperors of the Southern Imperial Court have been considered the legitimate Emperors of Japan. Moreover, the Southern Court controlled the Japanese imperial regalia. The Northern Court members are not considered legitimate Japanese emperors. They are called "Northern Court Emperors" now.

During the Meiji period, an Imperial decree dated March 3, 1911, established that the legitimate reigning monarchs of this period were the direct descendants of Emperor Go-Daigo through Emperor Go-Murakami, whose Southern Court had been established in exile in Yoshino, near Nara.

== Northern Court emperors ==
These are the Hokuchō or Northern Court emperors:

- Emperor Kōgon 1331–1333
- –
- Emperor Kōmyō 1336–1348
- Emperor Sukō 1348–1351
- –
- Emperor Go-Kōgon 1352–1371
- Emperor Go-En'yū 1371–1382
- Emperor Go-Komatsu 1382–1392 (then went on to reign as legitimate emperor 1392–1412)
