= Imperial Regalia of Japan =

Three legendary treasures

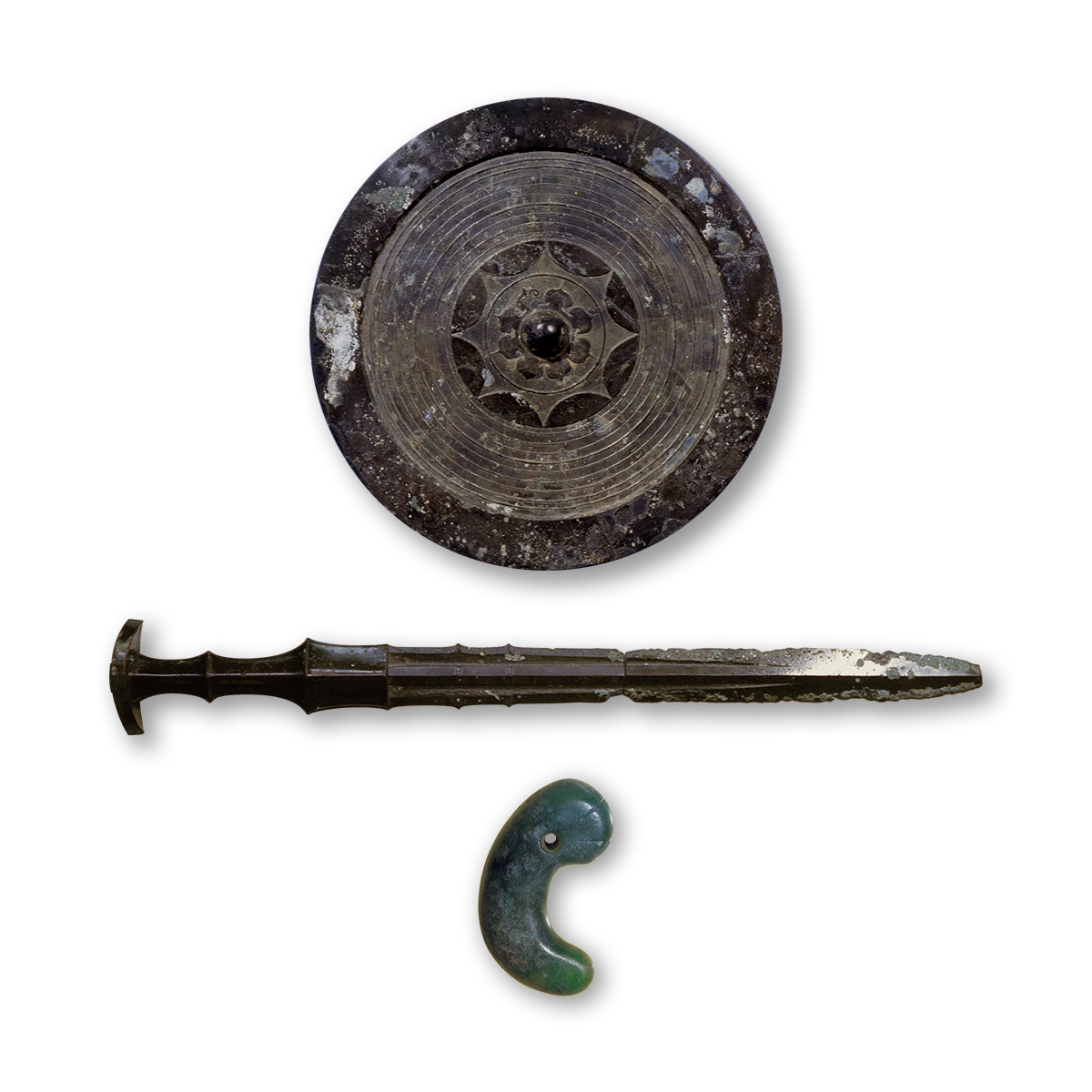
An artist's impression of the Three Sacred Treasures. The actual regalia remain unseen.

The Three Sacred Treasures (三種の神器, Sanshu no Jingi/Mikusa no Kamudakara) are the imperial regalia of Japan and consist of the sword Kusanagi no Tsurugi (草薙劍), the mirror Yata no Kagami (八咫鏡), and the jewel Yasakani no Magatama (八尺瓊勾玉). They represent the three primary virtues: valour (the sword), wisdom (the mirror), and benevolence (the jewel). The actual historical status of these legendary treasures is unknown as they are intentionally kept from public view to symbolize authority. There are many theories that surround their creation. The main theory surrounds Japan's first emperor, Jimmu, who was the original recipient of the Three Sacred Treasures and an additional piece, an octagonal mirror. Only those crowned Emperor are able to view these items.

Representations of the regalia are used in masakaki in many Shinto rituals.

== Legend ==
According to legend, these treasures were brought to Earth by Ninigi-no-Mikoto, legendary ancestor of the Japanese imperial line, when his grandmother, the sun goddess Amaterasu, sent him to pacify Japan. These treasures were eventually said to be passed down to Emperor Jimmu, who was the first Emperor of Japan and Ninigi's great-grandson. Traditionally, they were a symbol of the emperor's divinity as a descendant of Amaterasu, confirming his legitimacy as paramount ruler of Japan. When Amaterasu hid in a cave from her brother Susanoo-no-Mikoto, thus plunging the world in darkness, the goddess Ame-no-Uzume-no-Mikoto hung the mirror and jewels outside the cave and lured her out of hiding. Upon emerging from the cave, Amaterasu was so startled by her reflection in the mirror that it gave the gods an opportunity to extract her. Susanoo later presented the sword Kusanagi to Amaterasu as a token of apology; he had obtained it from the body of an eight-headed serpent, Yamata no Orochi.

At the conclusion of the Genpei War in 1185, the six-year-old Emperor Antoku and the Regalia were under the control of the Taira clan. They were present when the Taira were defeated by the rival Minamoto clan at the Battle of Dan-no-ura, which was fought on boats in the shallow Kanmon Straits. Although there are some medieval texts relating to the loss of the sword, which variously contended that a replica was forged afterwards, or that the lost sword itself was a replica, or even that the sword was returned to land by supernatural forces; replicas of the sword and mirror were actually made as early as the 9th century, and the original sword is considered entrusted to Atsuta Shrine in Nagoya.

The importance of the Imperial Regalia to Japan is evident from the declarations made by Emperor Hirohito to Kōichi Kido on 25 and 31 July 1945 at the end of World War II, when he ordered the Lord Keeper of the Privy Seal of Japan to protect them "at all costs". When Supreme Commander for the Allied Powers (GHQ) arrived in Japan, Emperor Hirohito's greatest fear was that the Three Sacred Treasures would fall into enemy hands. In a diary entry by Kōichi Kido dated 31 July, after the Potsdam Declaration, Emperor Hirohito told Kido, "In the end, I think it would be best to move the sacred treasures of Ise and Atsuta close to me and protect them. ... In the event of an emergency, I believe there is no other option than to protect them myself and share their fate," and expressed his readiness to jump into the sea with the sacred treasures and die if the situation came to that.

== Role ==
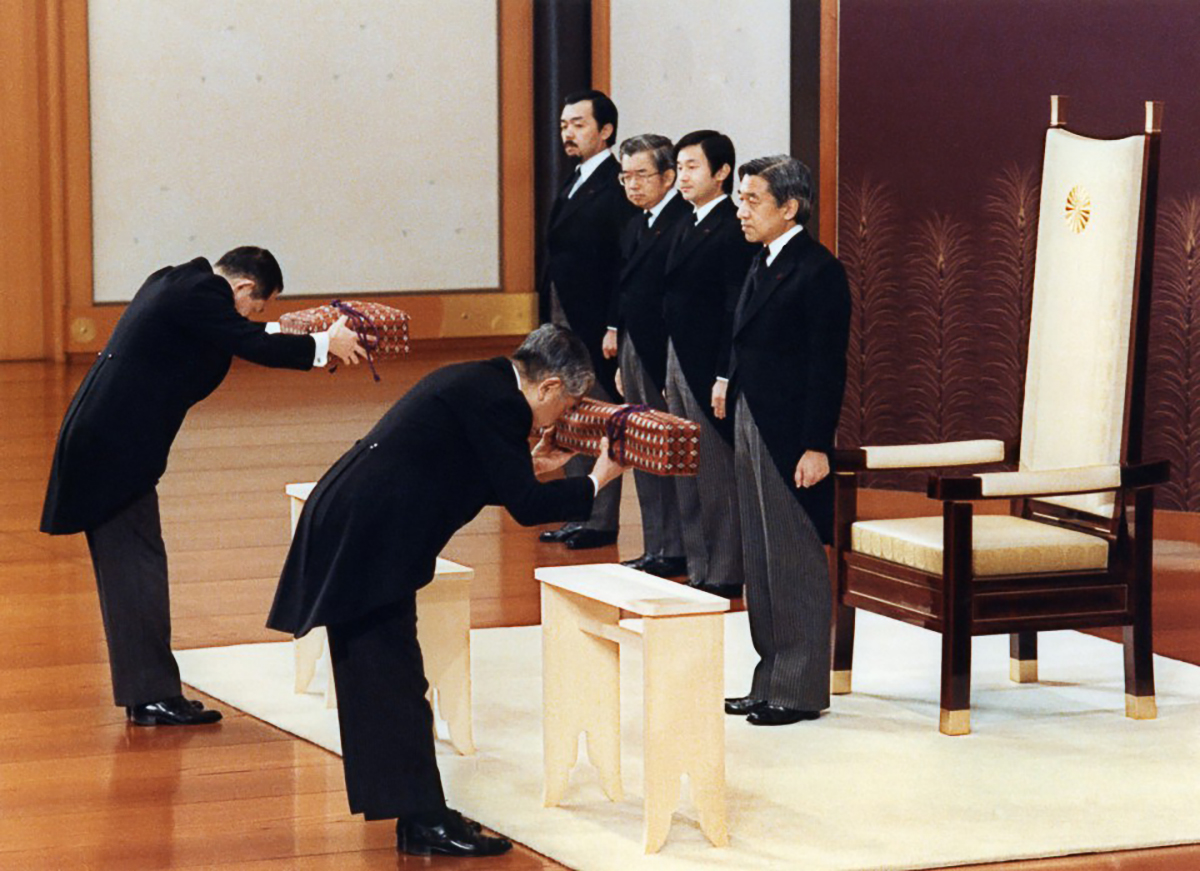
Presentation of the sword Kusanagi no Tsurugi and the Yasakani no Magatama at the accession of Emperor Akihito, 7 January 1989

Since 690, the presentation of these items to the Emperor by the priests at the shrine has been a central element of the enthronement ceremony. Under the pre-war 1909 Tōkyokurei ("Regulations Governing the Ascension to the Throne") and its addenda, the new emperor inherited the sword and jewel, two of the three imperial emblems, in a ceremony then called the Kenji Tōgyo no Gi, before proclaiming the succession at the Kyūchū Sanden (the three palace sanctuaries) and announcing the new era name. Following the postwar reforms, the same ceremony has since been conducted as the Kenji-tō-Shōkei-no-gi under the 1947 Imperial House Law. This ceremony is not public, and these items are by tradition seen only by the Emperor and certain priests. While their actual locations are not confirmed, it is commonly thought that the sword is located at the Atsuta Shrine in Nagoya, the jewel is located at the Three Palace Sanctuaries in Kōkyo (the Imperial Palace in Tokyo), and the mirror is located at the Ise Grand Shrine in Mie Prefecture. Their first post-World War II enthronement appearance occurred during the accession and enthronement of Akihito in 1989 and 1990. Aside from their presence during the abdication of Akihito on 30 April 2019, their latest appearance occurred during the enthronement of Emperor Naruhito. He formally took possession of the regalia in a brief ceremony on 1 May 2019. The items themselves were never revealed during these public occasions as they remained shrouded from view in packages or boxes.

When these items are not being used for their ceremonial purpose, their locations are kept off limits to the public. Mikael Adolphson, a professor at Cambridge University, stated that this hidden strategy "adds mystique, and thus, authority, to the objects." He went on to say that Shinto religious tradition is "especially protective" of its symbols. There is a general reluctance in Japan to allow a historical analysis of the regalia as such an assessment could potentially "de-mythologize" the items.

== Cultural references ==
- The phrase "Three Sacred Treasures" (ja:三種の神器 (電化製品)) is retrospectively applied to durable goods of modern Japan. During a policy address in 2003, then-Prime Minister Junichiro Koizumi said that during the mid-1950s and mid-1960s, the "three sacred treasures" for durable goods were the washing machine, refrigerator, and the black and white television, and the automobile, air conditioner, and color television set from the mid-1960s to the mid-1970s.
- Alvin and Heidi Toffler's Powershift use them to symbolize the three kinds of power they distinguish: force (sword), wealth (jewel) and knowledge (mirror).
- In Assassin's Creed Shadows, the three sacred treasures are central to the story.
- In The King of Fighters, The Three Sacred Treasures serve as a fundamental element of The storyline, embodied by Kyo Kusanagi with the Kusanagi Sword, Iori Yagami with the Yasakani Jewel, and Chizuru Kagura with the Yata Mirror.
- Three similar objects referred to as talismans in Naoko Takeuchi's Sailor Moon manga (the Space Sword wielded by Sailor Uranus, the Deep Aqua Mirror held by Sailor Neptune and the Garnet Orb atop Sailor Pluto's Garnet Rod) are likely references to the three sacred treasures.
- A Yu-Gi-Oh! Trading Card Game card, Mitsurugi Magatama, was inspired by Yasakani no Magatama.

== See also ==
- Ashtamangala: the eight auspicious symbols in Buddhist iconography
- Bagua, the eight Taoist symbols
- Chrysanthemum Throne
- Jinnō Shōtōki
- National seals of Japan
- Order of the Sacred Treasure
- Tenson kōrin
- Three Heavenly Seals: legendary tokens of authority in Korean lore
- Twelve Ornaments: emblems of imperial authority in Chinese ceremonial regalia

== Sources ==
- Hamasaki, Yōsuke (2025). 敗戦とトラウマ―次こそ「正しく」戦えるか [Defeat and Trauma: Will we be able to fight "rightly" next time?]. Criterion Series (in Japanese). Kijunsha. ISBN 978-4-8284-2751-5.
