= 1352 =

1352 in various calendars
- Gregorian calendar: 1352; MCCCLII
- Ab urbe condita: 2105
- Armenian calendar: 801; ԹՎ ՊԱ
- Assyrian calendar: 6102
- Balinese saka calendar: 1273–1274
- Bengali calendar: 758–759
- Berber calendar: 2302
- English Regnal year: 25 Edw. 3 – 26 Edw. 3
- Buddhist calendar: 1896
- Burmese calendar: 714
- Byzantine calendar: 6860–6861
- Chinese calendar: 辛卯年 (Metal Rabbit); 4049 or 3842 — to — 壬辰年 (Water Dragon); 4050 or 3843
- Coptic calendar: 1068–1069
- Discordian calendar: 2518
- Ethiopian calendar: 1344–1345
- Hebrew calendar: 5112–5113
- Hindu calendars
- Vikram Samvat: 1408–1409
- Shaka Samvat: 1273–1274
- Kali Yuga: 4452–4453
- Holocene calendar: 11352
- Igbo calendar: 352–353
- Iranian calendar: 730–731
- Islamic calendar: 752–753
- Japanese calendar: Kannō 3 / Bunna 1 (文和元年)
- Javanese calendar: 1264–1265
- Julian calendar: 1352; MCCCLII
- Korean calendar: 3685
- Minguo calendar: 560 before ROC 民前560年
- Nanakshahi calendar: −116
- Thai solar calendar: 1894–1895
- Tibetan calendar: ལྕགས་མོ་ཡོས་ལོ་ (female Iron-Hare); 1478 or 1097 or 325 — to — ཆུ་ཕོ་འབྲུག་ལོ་ (male Water-Dragon); 1479 or 1098 or 326

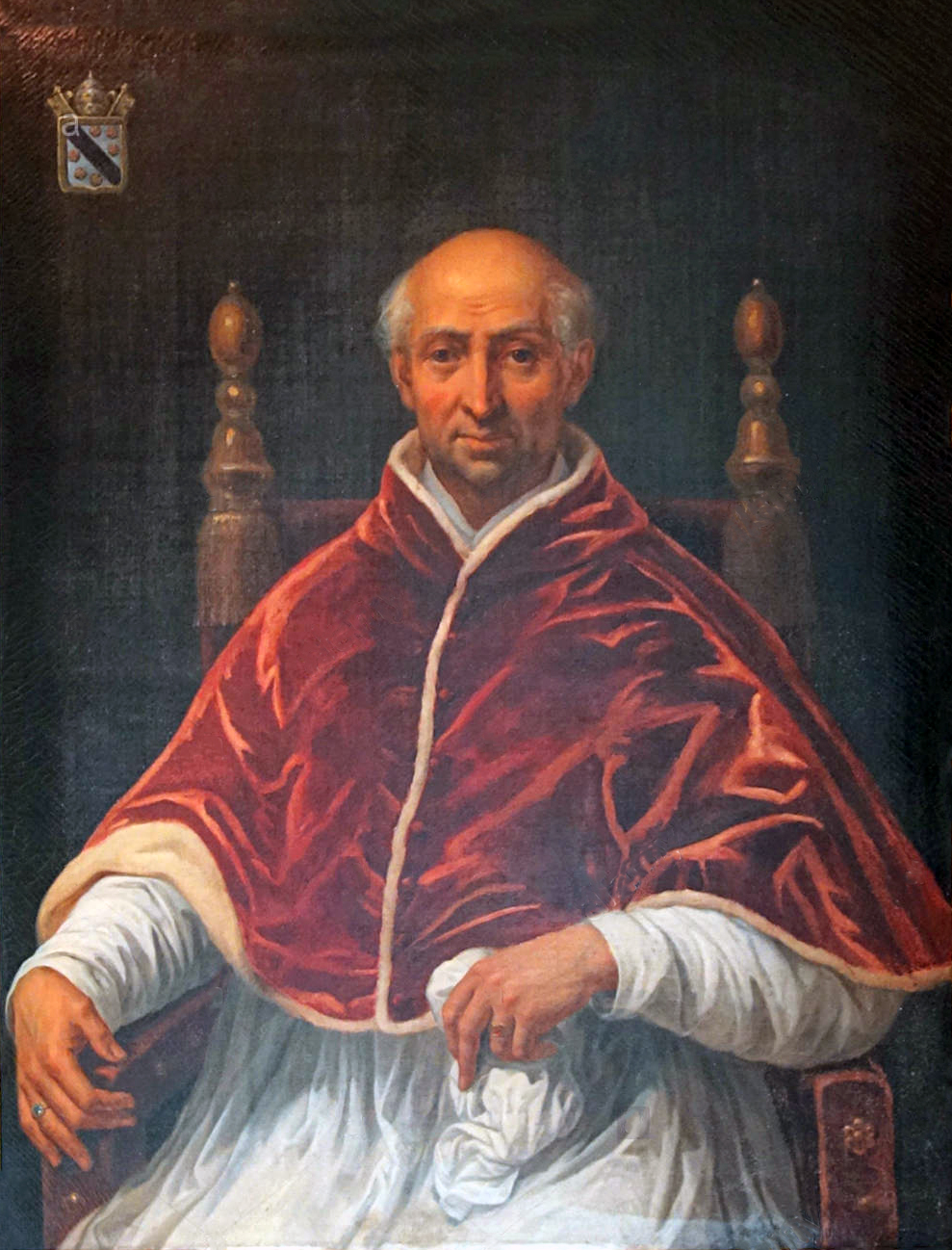
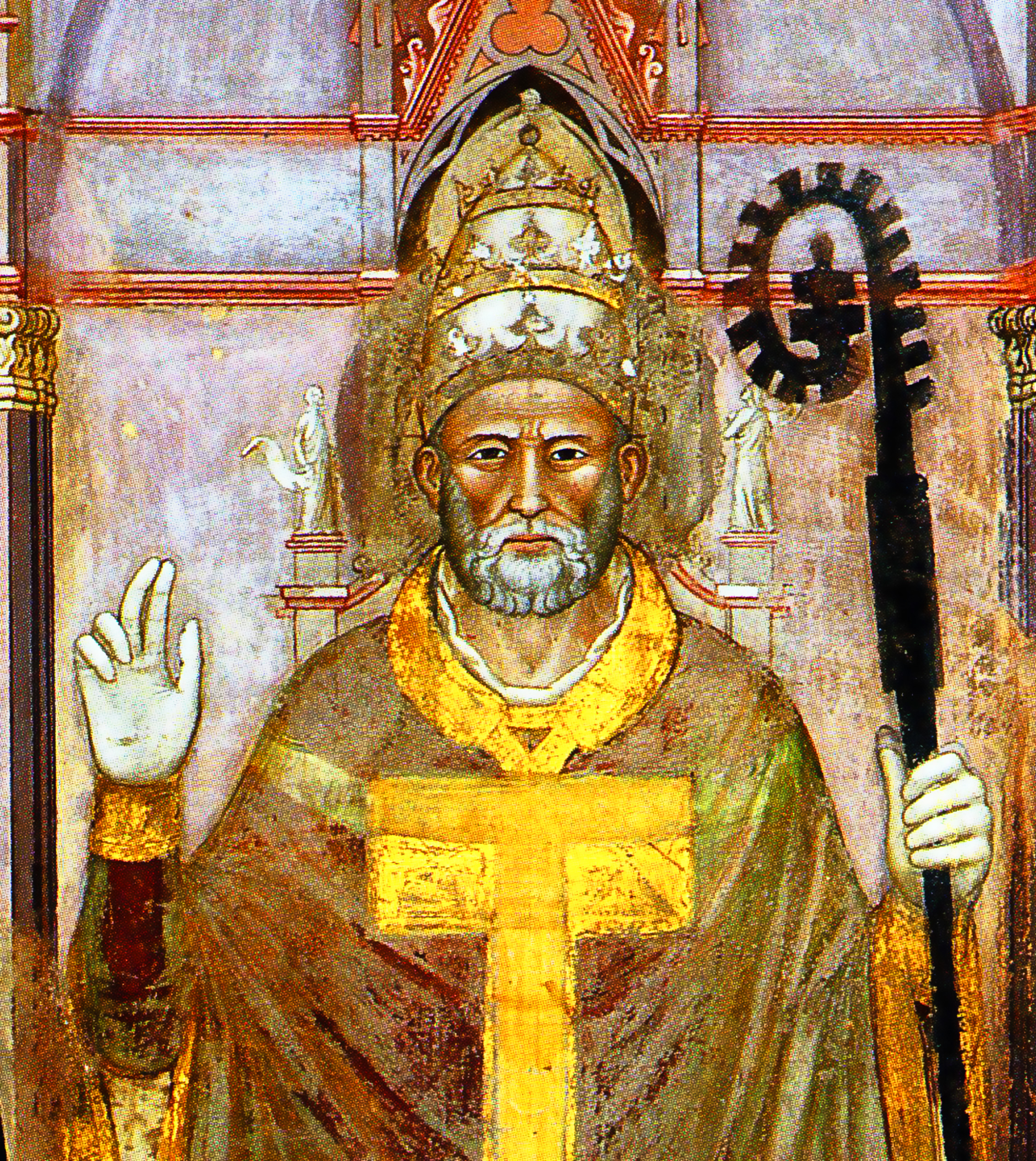
Pope Clement VI dies on December 6, Cardinal Étienne Aubert is selected as Pope Innocent VI on December 18.

Year 1352 (MCCCLII) was a leap year starting on Sunday of the Julian calendar.

== Events ==
=== January–March ===
- January 6 – The Order of the Star (Ordre de l'Étoile), the first military order in French history founded as an order of chivalry founded on November 6, 1351 by King Jean II of France, is bestowed for the first time, in a ceremony at Saint-Ouen-sur-Seine.
- January 7 – Following a rebellion of peasants in the Swiss canton of Valais against Guichard Tavel, the Roman Catholic bishop of Sion, Pope Clement VI issues an order of excommunication against any participants, after which troops gather in March at Saint-Maurice to crush the rebellion.
- January 13 – The English Parliament assembles at Westminster for a 29-day session, after being summoned by King Edward on November 15.
- February 11 – The English Parliament adjourns after a four-week session and laws passed therein take effect, including the Treason Act 1351, titled "A Declaration which Offences shall be adjudged Treason". The Act, given royal assent by King Edward III, codifies the common law offenses considered to be treason against the Crown.
- February 13 – War of the Straits – The Battle of the Bosporus is fought in a stormy sea into the night between the Genoese, Venetian, Aragonese, and Byzantine fleets. The Genoese emerge victorious, as the other fleets withdraw.
- February 16 – Red Turban Rebellions: Buddhist rebels against China's Yuan dynasty capture the city of Haozhou. The Yuan Chinese army sends raiders to raid monasteries in what is now the Anhui province, and burns down the temple monastery where the peasant Zhu Yuanzhang is studying Buddhist texts, prompting the future Emperor to join the Red Turbans two months later.
- March 3 – Less than three weeks after his victory at the Battle of the Bosporous, Genoese Admiral Paganino Doria, attempts to renew the fighting by ordering the surviving ships of Venice and Aragon to leave the area. In that all the navies are still recuperating from their losses, the Venetians and Aragonese stay in place. Doria declines to confront them and the Genoese ships anchor on the Asian side of the strait as guests of the Ottoman Sultan Orhan.
- March 23 – Louis I of Naples receives formal recognition by Pope Clement VI of the right to be co-ruler of Naples alongside his wife, Queen Joanna, whom he had married, without dispensation from the Pope, on August 22, 1347.

=== April–June ===
- April 5 – Southern Japanese troops led by Kitabatake Akiyoshi, Kusunoki Masanori and Chigusa Akitsune capture and occupy Kyoto, capital of Northern Japan. The Southern troops capture the Northern Emperor Sukō and the Crown Prince Tadahito as prisoners back to Tokyo, along with the retired Northern Emperor Kōgon and Emperor Kōmyō. The invaders install Imperial Prince Iyahito, son of Kogon, as emperor. The shogun Ashikaga Yoshiakira is called by the Northern nobles to rescue the city.
- April 15 – The peasant Zhu Yuanzhang joins the Red Turbans and serves under the command of Guo Zixing. Zhu will rise rapidly in rank and, with in three years, command an army of 30,000 rebels. By 1356, four years after having been a peasant, Zhu becomes the Emperor Hongwu of China and founds the Ming dynasty
- April 25 – The shogun Ashikaga Yoshiakira and his troops recapture Kyoto from the Southern enemy.
- April 27 – Pope Clement VI agrees with the Visconti family of Milan to give them control of church properties in northern Italy, and agrees to recognize the takeover of Bologna by the Archbishop Giovanni Visconti.
- May 6 – The Byzantine Empire, lea by John VI Kantakouzenos, signs a treaty with the Republic of Genoa] to cease hostilities in the War of the Straits. Genoa's right to possess its Black Sea port of Galata is recognized by Byzantium, which also bars ships from the Republic of Venice and from the Kingdom of Aragon from its ports.
- May 27 – The second coronation of Queen Joanna of Naples (Giovanna di Napoli) takes place in conjunction with the crowning of her husband Louis of Taranto (Luigi di Taranto) as the co-ruler and King of Naples. The coronation of Louis proceeds after Pope Clement VI gives his approval of the 1347 marriage of Joanna and Louis.
- June 4 – The Canton of Glarus joins the Old Swiss Confederacy.
- June 27 – The Canton of Zug joins the Old Swiss Confederacy.

=== July–September ===
- July 2 – A treaty of alliance is executed between the Kingdom of France and the Crown of Castile, along with a contract for King Pedro II of Castile to marry Blanche of Bourbon, the 14-year-old French daughter of Pierre, Duke of Bourbon, in order to secure the agreement.King Jean II of France ratifies the agreement on July 7, and King Pedro and Blanche marry 11 months later on June 3, 1353, after which Pedro deserts his new bride.
- August 18 – The long siege of Geertruidenberg castle, which had started 10 months earlier on October 4, 1351, ends after more than 10 months as the castle owner, Philips I of Polanen, surrenders the castle to the Cod faction led by John IV, Lord of Arkel, and the defenders are allowed free passage and the right to take their own personal items with them.
- September 25 – Emperor Go-Kōgon becomes 4th Emperor of the Northern Court of Japan.

=== October–December ===
- October 10 – The Byzantine Emperor John V Palaiologos signs a treaty with the Republic of Venice, ceding the Aegean Sea island of Tenedos to Venice in return for financial assistance.
- October – Byzantine civil war of 1352–1357 – Battle of Demotika: Fighting as allies of John VI Kantakouzenos, the Ottoman beylik scores its first victory on European soil, against the Serbs.
- November 4 – King Pedro II of Castile signs the marriage contract agreeing to marry Blanche of Bourbon.
- November 7 – Corpus Christi College is founded as a College of the University of Cambridge in England, by the Guilds of Corpus Christi and the Blessed Virgin Mary.
- December 6 – Pope Clement VI dies at Avignon, and 25 of the 26 living Roman Catholic Cardinals travel to the Palais des Papes in France to elect his successor.
- December 16 – The conclave of 25 cardinals begins at Avignon, and for the first time in the history of the papacy, the cardinals agree to a "conclave capitulation", limiting the powers of whomever is elected as the next Pope. Under the 1352 agreement, the cardinals agree that no new people will be elected to the College of Cardinals until their number decreases from 26 to 16, and that the College will be limited to only 20 cardinals. The parties agree also that two-thirds of the cardinals will need to approve changes in the rules of the College, that all revenue to the papacy will be shared with the cardinals, and that the cardinals will have veto power over papal decisions. Despite his agreement to the capitulation, the new pope will declare it invalid on July 6, 1353, less than seven months after his election.
- December 18 – Cardinal Étienne Aubert of France, the Roman Catholic Bishop of Ostia, is unanimously elected as the 199th pope at the end of the three-day conclave. He takes the regnal name Pope Innocent VI and is crowned on December 30 as the 199th pope at the cathedral of Notre Dame des Doms.

=== Date unknown ===
- Süleyman Pasha (son of Orhan) is probably granted control of Çimpe Castle on the Gallipoli peninsula by Emperor John VI Kantakouzenos, the first territory west of the Bosporus held by the Ottoman Empire.
- The Bengal Sultanate is formed after the realms of Satgaon, Lakhnauti and Sonargaon are united under Shamsuddin Ilyas Shah.
- Coming from Hungary, the noble Vlach Dragoş becomes the first voivode of Moldova, being seen as the founder of this principality (some scholars place this moment as early as 1345).
- Following the death of his father Basarab, Nicholas Alexander becomes voivode of Wallachia, after being co-ruler for about eight years.
- The town of Biel/Bienne, Switzerland, finalizes its alliance with the city of Bern.
- Lionel of Antwerp marries Elizabeth, daughter of William de Burgh, 3rd Earl of Ulster.
- Reginald de Cobham, 1st Baron Cobham becomes a Companion of the Most Noble Order of the Garter of England.
- The Metropolitan of the Ukrainian Greek Catholic Church; the Metropolitan of Halych begins to relocate back to Kyiv, after having moved to Halych in 1299. Thereafter, the Metropolitan will hold the title of Metropolitan of Kiev-Halych and All Rus.
- After years of begging and being a Buddhist monk, the penniless Chinese peasant Zhu Yuanzhang joins the Red Turban Rebellions against the Mongol-led Yuan dynasty of China; he will later become the first emperor of the Ming dynasty.
- Earliest surviving illustration of someone wearing spectacles, a fresco in the chapter house of the Dominican convent of San Nicolò, Treviso by Tommaso da Modena (anachronistically) depicting Hugh of Saint-Cher.
- Moroccan traveller Ibn Battuta reports the existence of the ngoni and balafon musical instruments, at the court of Mansa Musa.

== Births ==
- May 5 – Rupert of Germany, Count Palatine of the Rhine (d. 1410)
- Elizabeth of Slavonia, Latin empress consort of Constantinople
- date unknown
  - John Holland, 1st Duke of Exeter (d. 1400)
  - Vytautas the Great, Grand Duke of Lithuania (d. 1430)

== Deaths ==
- September 15 – Ewostatewos, Ethiopian monk and religious leader (b. 1273)
- December 6 – Pope Clement VI (b. 1291)
- date unknown
  - Matthias of Arras, French architect (b. 1290)
  - Elizabeth of Carinthia, Queen of Sicily, regent of Sicily (b. 1298)
  - William de Ros, 3rd Baron de Ros (b. 1325)
  - Basarab I of Wallachia
  - Al-Hakim II, Caliph of Cairo
  - Laurence Minot, English poet (b. 1300)
  - Vasilii Kalika, Archbishop of Novgorod
  - Yoshida Kenkō, Japanese monk and author (b. 1283)
