= Shōhei =

Period of Japanese history (1346–1370)

Shōhei (正平) was a Japanese era (年號, nengō, lit. year name) of the Southern Court during the Era of Northern and Southern Courts after Kōkoku and before Kentoku. This period spanned the years from December 1346 to July 1370. The Southern Court emperors in Yoshino were Emperor Go-Murakami (後村上天皇, Go-Murakami-tennō) and Emperor Chōkei (長慶天皇, Chōkei-tennō). The emperors in Kyoto were Emperor Kōmyō (光明天皇, Kōmyō-tennō), Emperor Sukō (崇光天皇, Sukō-tennō) and Emperor Go-Kōgon (後光嚴天皇, Go-Kōgon-tennō) in the north.

== Nanboku-chō overview ==
The Imperial seats during the Nanboku-chō period were in relatively close proximity, but geographically distinct. They were conventionally identified as: Northern capital : Kyoto; Southern capital : Yoshino.

During the Meiji period, an Imperial decree dated March 3, 1911 established that the legitimate reigning monarchs of this period were the direct descendants of Emperor Go-Daigo through Emperor Go-Murakami, whose Southern Court (南朝, nanchō) had been established in exile in Yoshino, near Nara.

Until the end of the Edo period, the militarily superior pretender-Emperors supported by the Ashikaga shogunate had been mistakenly incorporated in Imperial chronologies despite the undisputed fact that the Imperial Regalia were not in their possession.

This illegitimate Northern Court (北朝, hokuchō) had been established in Kyoto by Ashikaga Takauji.

== Events of the Shohei Era ==
- 1346 (Shōhei 1): The kampaku Takatsukasa Morohira was relieved of his duties; and he was replaced by Nijō Yoshimoto.
- 1347 (Shōhei 2): Nijō Yoshimoto was demoted from his high office as Kampaku; and he was instead given the title and responsibilities of sadaijin.
- 1349 (Shōhei 4): Go-Murakami flees to A'no; Ashikaga Tadayoshi and Kō no Moronao quarrel; Ashikaga Motouji, son of Takauji, appointed Kamakura Kanrei
- 1350 (Shōhei 5): Yoshinori guarded Kyoto.
- 1350 (Shōhei 5): Tadayoshi, excluded from administration, turns priest; Tadayoshi's adopted son, Ashikaga Tadafuyu is wrongly repudiated as a rebel.
- 1351 (Shōhei 6): Tadayoshi joins Southern Court, southern army takes Kyoto; truce, Takauji returns to Kyoto; Tadayoshi and Takauji reconciled; Kō no Moronao and Kō no Moroyasu are exiled.
- 1350–1352 ((Shōhei 5–Shōhei 7): Armed conflict, variously known as the Kannō disturbance or Kannō incident (觀廣擾亂, Kannō Jōran) or Kannō no juran, developed from antagonism between Shōgun Ashikaga Takauji and his brother, Ashikaga Tadayoshi. Disagreement about the influence of Kō no Moronao diminished after death of Moronao. Tadayoshi was ordered to relocate to Kamakura. The brothers eventually reconciled before Tadayoshi's death in 1352.
- 1352 (Shōhei 7): The grandfather of the emperor is advanced from the rank of dainagon to nadaijin.
- 1353 (Shōhei 8): Kyoto occupied by southern forces under Yamana Tokiuji; and the capital was retaken by the Ashikaga.
- 1354 (Shōhei 9): Takauji flees with Go-Kōgon; Kitabatake Chikafusa dies.
- 1355 (Shōhei 10): Kyoto taken by southern army; Kyoto retaken again by the Ashikaga forces.
- 1356 (Shōhei 11): Minamoto no Michisuke was advanced from the court rank of dainagon to nadaijin.
- 1356 Shōhei 11): Ashikaga Yoshinori is raised to the second rank of the third class in the court hierarchy.
- 1357 (Shōhei 12): Emperor Go-Murakami, who had captured former-Emperor Kōgon, former-Emperor Kōmyō and former-Emperor Sukō in 1352, released all three of them and permitted their return from Yoshino to Kyoto.
- 1358 (Shōhei 13): Death of Ashikaga Takauji; Ashikaga Yoshiakira appointed shōgun; dissention and defections in shogunate.
- 1361 (Shōhei 16): Snowfall was unusually heavy; and there was also a disastrous fire in Kyoto as well as a violent earthquake.
- 1361 (Shōhei 16): Eigen-ji, a Zen Buddhist temple located in modern-day Shiga prefecture, was founded Sasaki Ujiyori; and its first Abbot was Jakushitsu Genko.
- 1362 (Shōhei 17): Hosokawa Kiyouji and Kusunoki Masanori attack Kyoto, Ashikaga Yoshiakira flees, but regains the capital in twenty days.

== Northern Court Equivalents ==
- Jōwa
- Kan'ō
- Bunna
- Enbun
- Kōan
- Jōji
- Ōan

== Notes ==
Preceded by Kōkoku	Era or nengō Shōhei; 1346–1370	Succeeded by Kentoku
