= Glossary of Japanese history =

This is the glossary of Japanese history including the major terms, titles and events the casual (or brand-new) reader might find useful in understanding articles on the subject.

== A ==
- ashigaru (足軽) – feudal foot soldiers drawn from the peasant or commoner class, rather than from the samurai hereditary warrior class.
- Ashikaga – bushi clan from Kamakura whose members ruled as shōguns over Japan from 1336 to 1573.

== B ==
- bakufu (幕府) – a shōgun's government; commonly called "shogunate" in English.
- bettō (別当) – the head of a civilian, military or religious institution.
- bugyō (奉行) – a magistrate. Examples include the Edo period machibugyō who administered the city during the Edo period.
- bushi (武士) – a member of the warrior class (a samurai).
- bushidō (武士道) – purported warrior code of honor, analogous to Western chivalry.

== C ==
- chōnin (町人, "townsman") - a social class that emerged in Japan during the early years of the Tokugawa period. The majority of chōnin were merchants, but some were craftsmen, as well.

== D ==
- daimyō (大名) – a feudal lord during the later Muromachi period, Sengoku period, Azuchi–Momoyama period and Edo period.

== E ==
- Edo (江戸) – the old name of Tokyo when it was the seat of the Tokugawa shogunate. Alternate, outdated spellings include Yedo and Yeddo.
- Eikyō Rebellion (永享の乱 Eikyō no Ran) – Ashikaga Mochiuji's 1439 rebellion against the Ashikaga shogunate. See also the article Kantō kubō.

== F ==
- fudai daimyō (譜代) – a daimyō who was a hereditary vassal of the Tokugawa before the Battle of Sekigahara (1600). See also tozama daimyō.

== G ==
- gaikoku bugyō (外国奉行) – commissioners appointed to oversee foreign trade and relations between 1858 and 1868.
- Genkō War (元弘の乱, Genkō no Ran) – a civil war which marked the fall of the Kamakura shogunate and end of the power of the Hōjō clan
- Genpei War (源平合戦 Genpei Kassen) (1180–1185) – a conflict between the Taira and Minamoto clans and in late-Heian period Japan that resulted with the defeat of the Taira.
- genrō (元老) – unofficial term for retired Japanese statesmen considered "founding fathers" of modern Japan who served as informal advisors to the emperor during the Meiji and Taishō periods.
- gokenin (or kenin; 御家人) – A vassal of the shōgun during the Kamakura, Ashikaga and Tokugawa shogunates.
- Gosanke (御三家)– Three branches of the Tokugawa clan from which a shōgun might be chosen if the main line became extinct. Established by Tokugawa Ieyasu in the early Edo period. They were the daimyō of the Owari (or Bishū), Kii (or Kishū), and Mito Han.
- Gosankyō (御三卿) – Three branches of the Tokugawa clan from which a shōgun might be chosen if the main line became extinct. Established by Tokugawa Yoshimune in the middle of the Edo period.
- gosho (御所) – The Emperor's throne or his residence. The residence of a member of the Imperial family, and a term to indicate those members. The residence of a prince or shōgun, and a term for prince or shōgun.
- gōzoku (豪族) – local samurai clans with significant local land holdings.

== H ==
- haibutsu kishaku (廃仏毀釈)– anti-Buddhist violence, in particular that of the early Meiji period. See also shinbutsu bunri.
- haimyō (俳名) – a "haiku pen-name". It was common in the Edo period for artists, writers, kabuki actors and others to take part in poetry circles and to take on pen-names under which they would compose poetry or create related works, such as haiga paintings.
- han (藩) – feudal fiefs; the land owned and controlled by a noble lord or clan.
- hansatsu (藩札) – scrip issued by a han.
- Hatamoto (旗本) - high-ranking direct retainers of the Tokugawa shogunate
- Heian
  - (a) Heian-kyō (平安京) – capital of Japan from 794 to 1185; located in present-day Kyoto.
  - (b) Heian period (平安時代) – historical period during which capital was located at Heian-kyō.
- Hiki Yoshikazu's rebellion (比企能員の乱 Hiki Yoshikazu no Ran) – Hiki Yoshikazu's rebellion against the Hōjō clan.
- Hōjō clan (北条氏) – branch of the Taira clan that ruled Japan from Kamakura during the Kamakura period. Not to be confused with the Later Hōjō clan (see below).
- Hōkōshū (奉公衆) – During the Muromachi period, the Gokenin part of the shōgun's personal army. They constituted five uits were in service from the time of Ashikaga Yoshimitsu to that of Ashikaga Yoshinori. The KantōkKubō had his own Hōkōshū, which were an important part of his power base.

== J ==
- jitō (地頭) – shōgun-appointed officials that managed shōen (manors) during the Kamakura and Muromachi shogunates.
- Jōkyū War (承久の乱 Jōkyū no Ran) – a 1221 war between Emperor Go-Toba and the Kamakura shogunate.

== K ==
- kaikin (海禁) – "maritime prohibitions" imposed by the Tokugawa shogunate from roughly 1635 to 1853. See also hai jin, sakoku.
- Kami (神) - are the spirits or phenomena that are worshipped in the religion of Shinto.
- Kamikaze (神風) – were a part of the Japanese Special Attack Units of military aviators who initiated suicide attacks for the Empire of Japan. It also means "divine wind" or "spirit wind".
- kampaku (関白) – an Imperial regent who served a number of functions, including chief advisor and secretary.
- Kannō disturbance (観応擾乱, Kannō Jōran), also called Kannō incident – a 1350 factional struggle with serious consequences pitting Ashikaga Tadayoshi, Takauji's brother, against the Kō brothers, Moronao and Moroyasu. See also the article Nanboku-chō period.
- kanrei (管領) - a high political post (shōgun's deputy) of the Kamakura and Ashikaga shogunates. Originally called shitsuji.
- kenin (家人) – one of the lower castes under the ritsuryō system (see below). Also a direct vassal of the shōgun during the Kamakura period (see "gokenin" above).
- Kentō-shi (遣唐使) – mission to Tang China (唐) for importing the technologies and culture of China to Japan.
- Kenzui-shi (遣隋使) – mission to Sui China (隋) for importing the technologies and culture of China to Japan.
- koku (石) – an amount of rice equal to the amount one man eats in a year; used in feudal times as a measurement of income and of wealth.
- Koga kubō (古河公方) – title arbitrarily assumed by Ashikaga Shigeuji after his escape from Kamakura to the city of Koga, Ibaraki.
- kubō (公方) – shōgun. Title later also assumed by the Kantō kanrei, who became known as Kantō kubō.
- kugyō (公卿) – a collective term for the very few most powerful men attached to the court of the Emperor of Japan in pre-Meiji eras.
- Kyōtoku Incident (享徳の乱, Kyōtoku no Ran) – a long series of skirmishes and conflicts fought for control of the Kantō region of Japan in the 15th century.

== L ==
- Later Hōjō clan (後北条氏) – also known as Odawara Hōjō clan. A powerful warrior clan of the Sengoku period, it had renamed itself after the original Hōjō clan from Kamakura (see above).

== M ==
- Meiji Restoration – The 1867 restoration of the Emperor to being the true ruler of the country, in practice as well as name, and the downfall of the last shogunate.
- Minamoto – the Minamoto clan defeated the rival Taira clan in 1185, establishing the first shogunate.

== N ==
- Nagaoka-kyō (長岡京) – the capital of Japan from 784 to 794 (after Nara, before Kyoto).

== O ==
- Ōnin War (応仁の乱, Ōnin no Ran) – a civil war that lasted from 1467 to 1477 during the Muromachi period.

== R ==
- rensho (連署) – "co-signatory", the rensho was the assistant to the regent of the Kamakura shogunate.
- ritsuryō (律令) – the East Asian historical law system based on the philosophies of Confucianism and Chinese Legalism. In Japan, ritsuryō was in effect during the late Asuka period, the Nara period and the early Heian period. The Taihō-ritsuryō (大宝律令, Code of Taihō) was a key element of the ritsuryō.
- rōjū (老中) – one of the highest-ranking government posts in the Tokugawa shogunate. There were usually four or five rōjū.
- rōnin (浪人) – a samurai without a lord or master during the feudal period (1185–1868) of Japan.

== S ==
- sadaijin (左大臣) – Senior Minister of State overseeing all branches of the Department of State with his deputy, the udaijin.
- sakoku (鎖国) – the "self-isolation" policy followed during the Edo period (1603–1867), under which Japan engaged in limited trade or communication with the outside world.
- samurai (侍) – the feudal Japanese noble warrior class.
- sankin-kōtai (参勤交代) – the Edo period (1603–1867) policy under which feudal lords (daimyōs) had to travel to the capital in Edo annually, and to leave their families in Edo year-round. This was used by the shōgun (warlord leader of the nation) to prevent rebellion.
- Sengoku period (戦国時代, sengoku jidai) was a time of social upheaval and nearly constant military conflict that lasted roughly from the middle of the 15th century to the beginning of the 17th century.
- seppuku (切腹) – honorable ritual suicide. Also called hara-kiri. One of the death penalties which respected a samurai's honor. The belly was ceremonially cut and an assistant then cut the head from the back. Suicide allowed a samurai to keep his honor because it was considered dishonorable for a samurai to be killed by others.
- sesshō (摂政) – Imperial regent for a child emperor or empress; the regent often continued in this role, changing titles to kampaku once the child emperor came of age.
- shikken (執権) – the regent for the shōgun during the Kamakura shogunate. The Hōjō clan monopolized the shikken post and was therefore the effective ruler of Japan.
- shinbutsu bunri (神仏分離) – The forcible separation of Buddhism and Shinto, in particular during the Meiji era.
- shinto (神道) – is the traditional religion of Japan that focuses on ritual practices to be carried out diligently to establish a connection between present-day Japan and its ancient past.
- Shinto and Buddhism Separation Order (神仏判然令, Shinbutsu Hanzenrei) - A Meiji era law that forbade the mixing of Buddhism and Shinto, an effort to weaken Buddhist temporal power. See shinbutsu bunri
- shitsuji (執事) – see kanrei above.
- shizoku (士族) – "warrior families", term used to refer to former samurai after the abolition of the class system following the Meiji Restoration.
- shōen (荘園 or 庄園) – a manor and its fields.
- shōgun (将軍) – warlord dictator; the practical head of the nation, having seized power militarily or inherited it from another shōgun.
- shogunate – see bakufu
- shugo (守護) – officials appointed by the shōgun to oversee one or more provinces.

== T ==
- taikō (太閤) – a title frequently taken on by retired kampaku (Imperial regents). The term is most commonly used in reference to Toyotomi Hideyoshi.
- tairō (大老) – the highest-ranking government post of the Tokugawa shogunate. There was usually only one tairō, or, at times, none.
- tandai (探題) – during the Kamakura and Muromachi periods, tandai was a colloquialism for a high-ranking official (for example a shikken or rensho) with governmental, judiciary or military responsibilities within a certain area.
- Tokugawa (徳川) – Tokugawa Ieyasu united Japan through force, becoming its shōgun in 1603. His family ruled in that position until 1867.
- tokusō (得宗) – the head of the mainline Hōjō clan, who monopolized the position of shikken (see above) during the Kamakura shogunate.
- tozama daimyō (外様) – a daimyō who had become a vassal of Tokugawa Ieyasu after the Battle of Sekigahara (see fudai). There were tozama who had fought both for and against Ieyasu.

== U ==
- udaijin (右大臣) – Junior Minister of State overseeing all branches of the Department of State during the late Nara and Heian periods, deputy of the sadaijin (see above).
- Uesugi clan (上杉氏, Uesugi-shi) – a clan, descended from the Fujiwara clan, important for its power in the Muromachi and Sengoku periods (roughly 14th–17th centuries).
- Uesugi Zenshū's rebellion (上杉禅秀の乱 Uesugi Zenshū no Ran) – Uesugi Zenshū's 1416 rebellion against Ashikaga Mochiuji.

== W ==
- Warring states period - See Sengoku period

== Y ==
- Yūki War (結城合戦) – 15th century rebellion by the Yūki clan against the Ashikaga shogunate.

== See also ==
- Category:Government of feudal Japan
- Japanese units of measurement
