= Emperor Go-Kōgon =

Japanese Northern Emperor from 1352 to 1371

Emperor Go-Kōgon 後光厳天皇
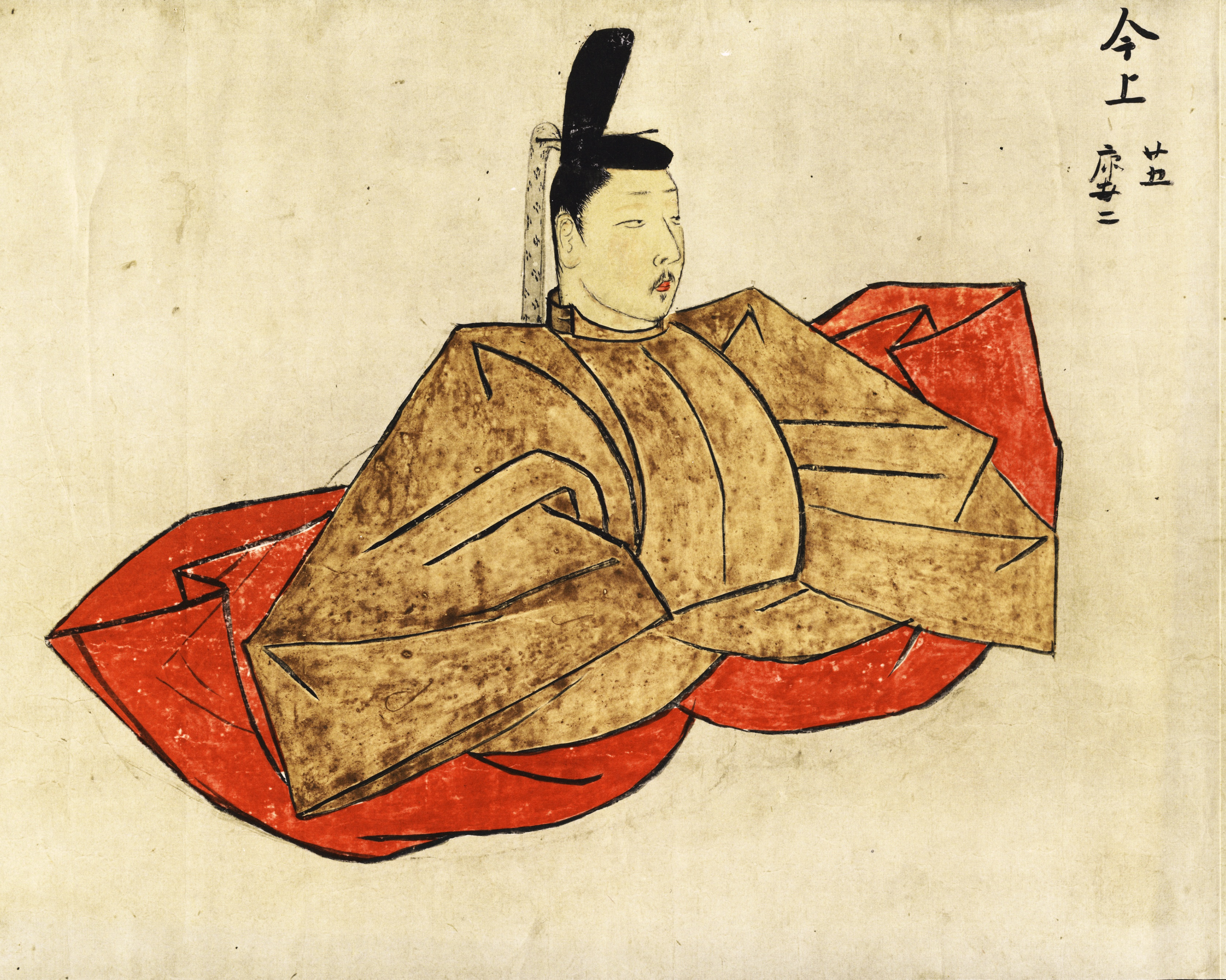

4th Northern Emperor
- Reign: 25 September 1352 – 9 April 1371
- Enthronement: 21 January 1354
- Predecessor: Sukō
- Successor: Go-En'yū
- Born: 23 March 1338
- Died: 12 March 1374 (aged 35)
- Burial: Fukakusa no Kita no Misasagi (深草北陵), Kyoto
- Spouse: Hirohashi Nakako
- Issue among others...: Emperor Go-En'yū
Posthumous name
- Tsuigō: Emperor Go-Kōgon (後光厳院 or 後光厳天皇)
- House: Imperial House of Japan
- Father: Emperor Kōgon
- Mother: Sanjō Hideko

Emperor Go-Kōgon (後光厳天皇, Go-Kōgon-tennō; 23 March 1338 – 12 March 1374) was the 4th of the Emperors of Northern Court during the Period of the Northern and Southern Courts. According to pre-Meiji scholars, his reign spanned the years from 1352 through 1371.

This Nanboku-chō "sovereign" was named after his father Emperor Kōgon and go- (後), translates literally as "later;" and thus, he may be called the "Later Emperor Kōgon", or, in some older sources, may be identified as "Emperor Kōgon, the second", or as "Emperor Kōgon II."

== Genealogy ==
His personal name was Iyahito (彌仁).

He was the second son of the Northern Pretender Emperor Kōgon, and brother of his predecessor, Emperor Sukō. His mother was Hideko (秀子), Sanjō Kinhide's daughter

- Lady-in-waiting: Hirohashi (Fujiwara) Nakako (廣橋（藤原）仲子; 1336/9-1427) later Sukenmon’in (崇賢門院), Hirohashi Kanetsuna's daughter
  - Second son: Imperial Prince Ohito (緒仁親王) later Emperor Go-En'yū
  - Fifth son: Imperial Prince Priest Eijo (1362–1437; 永助入道親王)
  - Sixth son: Imperial Prince Priest Gyōnin (堯仁法親王; 1363–1430）
  - Twelfth son: Imperial Prince Priest Gyōsho (堯性法親王; 1371–1388)
- Consort: Uemon-no-Suke no Tsubone (右衛門佐局)
  - First son: Imperial Prince Priest Ryōnin (1355–1370; 亮仁入道親王)
  - Third son: Imperial Prince Priest Gyojo (行助法親王; 1360–1386）
  - son: (1361–1369)
  - Seventh son: Imperial Prince Priest Kakuzō (1363–1390; 覺増法親王)
- Consort: Sakyōdaibu-no-Tsubone (左京大夫局), Hōin Chōkai's daughter
  - First daughter: Imperial Princess Haruko (d. 1390; 治子内親王)
  - Fourth son: Imperial Prince Priest Kakuei (覺叡法親王; 1361–1377)
  - Eighth son: Imperial Prince Priest Dōen (道圓入道親王; 1364–1385)
  - Eleventh son: Imperial Prince Priest Shōjo (聖助法親王; b.1371)
- Consort:Shonagon-naishi (少納言内侍), Tachibana no Mochishige ‘s daughter
  - Tenth son: Imperial Prince Priest Myōshō (1367–1396; 明承法親王)
- from unknown women
  - Ninth son: Imperial Prince Priest Kanshu (1366–1401; 寬守法親王)
  - Thirteenth son: Imperial Prince Priest Kankyō (1373–1405; 寬教入道親王)
  - Second daughter: Imperial Princess Kenshi (見子內親王)
  - Fourteenth son: ?
  - Daughter: Princess Shūnin (秀仁女王)

== Events of Go-Kōgon's life ==
In his own lifetime, Go-Kōgon and those around him believed that he occupied the Chrysanthemum Throne from 25 September 1352 to 9 April 1371.

In 1351, Ashikaga Takauji briefly returned to the allegiance of the Southern Dynasty, causing the Southern Court to briefly consolidate control of the Imperial Line. However, this peace fell apart in April 1352. On this occasion, the Southern Court abducted Retired (Northern) Emperors Emperor Kōgon and Emperor Kōmyō as well as Emperor Sukō and the Crown Prince Tadahito from Kyoto to Anau, the location of the Southern Court. This produced a state of affairs in which there was no Emperor in Kyoto. Because of this, Imperial Prince Iyahito became emperor in 1352 with the support of Ashikaga Yoshiakira.

During this period, the Era of the Northern and Southern Courts, because of the antagonism between the two competing dynasties, public order in Kyoto was disturbed. The Southern Court repeatedly recaptured Kyoto. Emperor Go-Kōgon was forced to repeatedly flee from Kyoto to Ōmi Province and other places. Around the time that Ashikaga Yoshimitsu was named shōgun (1368), the Southern Court's power weakened, and order was restored to Kyoto. Also around this time, the Emperor's authority began to show its weakness.

On 9 April 1371, he abdicated in favor of his son, who became Emperor Go-En'yū. He continued to rule as Cloistered Emperor until he died of illness on 12 March 1374. He is enshrined with other emperors at the imperial tomb called Fukakusa no kita no misasagi (深草北陵) in Fushimi-ku, Kyoto.

== Eras of Go-Kōgon's reign ==
The years of Go-Kōgon's reign are more specifically identified by more than one era name or nengō.

Nanboku-chō Southern court

- Eras as reckoned by legitimate Court (as determined by Meiji rescript)
- Shōhei (1346–1370)
- Kentoku (1370–1372)

Nanboku-chō Northern court

- Eras as reckoned by pretender Court (as determined by Meiji rescript)
- Kannō (1350–1352)
- Bunna (1352–1356)
- Embun (1356–1361)
- Kōan (1361–1362)
- Jōji (1362–1368)
- Ōan (1368–1375)

== Southern Court rivals ==
- Emperor Go-Murakami
- Emperor Chōkei

== See also ==
- Emperor of Japan
- List of Emperors of Japan
- Imperial cult

== Notes ==
Japanese Imperial kamon — a stylized chrysanthemum blossom

Regnal titles
Preceded by Emperor Sukō	Northern Emperor; 1352–1371	Succeeded by Emperor Go-En'yū
