= Kō brothers =

Kō brothers may refer to:

- Kō no Moronao
- Kō no Moroyasu
