= Kannō disturbance =

1350–52 Ashikaga civil war in Japan

Ashikaga Tadayoshi, main cause of the Kannō disturbance. Recent research suggests that this portrait, traditionally believed to be of Minamoto no Yoritomo, is instead likely to be his.

The Kannō disturbance or Kannō incident (観応擾乱, Kannō Jōran), also called Kannō no juran, was a civil war which developed from antagonisms between shōgun Ashikaga Takauji and his brother, Ashikaga Tadayoshi, thus dividing and weakening the early Ashikaga shogunate. These events are labeled Kannō after the Japanese era or nengō which was proclaimed by the Northern Court during the years 1350 through 1351 in the Nanboku-chō period of Japanese history. One of the main effects of the Disturbance was the re-invigoration of the Southern Court's war effort due to the flow of renegades from Kyoto who followed Tadayoshi to the Southern capital of Yoshino, near Nara.

== Resurgence of the Southern Court ==
=== Events ===
The Imperial seats during the Kannō disturbance were in relatively close proximity, but geographically distinct. They were: Northern capital: Kyoto; Southern capital: Yoshino

Takauji was nominally shōgun but, having proved not to be up to the task of ruling the country, for more than ten years Tadayoshi governed in his stead. The relationship between the two brothers was however destined to be destroyed by an extremely serious episode called the Kannō Incident, an event which takes its name from the Kannō era (1350–1351) during which it took place and which had grave consequences for the entire country. Trouble between the two started when Takauji made Kō no Moronao his shitsuji, or deputy. Tadayoshi did not like Moronao and his policies so (at least according to the Taiheiki), after every effort to get rid of him failed, he tried to have him assassinated. Tadayoshi in 1349 was forced by Moronao to leave the government, shave his head and become a Buddhist monk with the name Keishin under the guidance of Zen master, poet, and old associate Musō Soseki. In 1350 he rebelled and joined his brother's enemies, the supporters of the Southern court, whose Emperor Go-Murakami appointed him general of all his troops. In 1351 he defeated Takauji, occupied Kyoto, and entered Kamakura. During the same year he captured and executed the Kō brothers, Moronao and Moroyasu, at Mikage (Settsu province). The following year his fortunes turned and he was defeated by Takauji at Sattayama. A reconciliation between the brothers proved to be brief. Tadayoshi fled to Kamakura, but Takauji pursued him there with an army. In March 1352, shortly after an ostensible second reconciliation, Tadayoshi died suddenly, according to the Taiheiki by poisoning.

=== Background ===
The extremely divisive Kannō Incident that divided the Muromachi regime put a temporary hold on the new shogunate's integration. Before the incident, the bureaucratic organs of the early regime were under the separate jurisdiction of the Ashikaga brothers Takauji and Tadayoshi, creating a bifurcated administration. Takauji was the leader of the house vassals, and thus controlled the Board of Retainers (the Samurai-dokoro) and the Office of Rewards (the Onshō-kata), while Tadayoshi was the bureaucratic leader controlling the Board of Inquiry's administration of the regime's judicial functions.

The Board of Retainers was used as a disciplinary organ towards house vassals; brigandage and other crimes were prosecuted. The Office of Rewards was used to hear the claims of and to give fiefs to deserving vassals. The Office of Rewards was used to enroll new warriors who were potential adversaries of the regime. The major judicial organ, the Board of Coadjutors, decided on all land dispute cases and quarrels involving inheritance. All judicial functions are par excellence used to resolve conflicts and disputes legally, within an institutional framework. Bureaucrats (bugyōnin) for the new regime were recruited from the ranks of those who served the Hōjō regime before its fall. They were valuable because they knew how to read and write, a task beyond the reach of most warriors.

In the 1350s, the Kannō Incident and its aftermath divided and nearly destroyed the early regime. On the surface the incident looks like a factional struggle pitting Ashikaga Tadayoshi, Takauji's brother, against the Kō brothers, Moronao and Moroyasu backed by Takauji. The conflict can be pinpointed to differences in opinion regarding the estate system and, behind these differing opinions, to the different bureaucracies controlled by Takauji and Tadayoshi. On the whole Takauji was the innovator, while Tadayoshi played the conservative, wanting to preserve the policies of the past. In his capacity as a military leader of vassal bands, Takauji did two things that conflicted with Tadayoshi: he appointed vassals to shugo posts as a reward for battlefield heroics, and he divided the shōen estates, giving half of them to his vassals in fief or as stewardships. Tadayoshi strenuously contested these policies through the drafting of the Kemmu Formulary that opposed the appointment of shugo as a reward for battlefield service. He also opposed any sort of outright division of estate lands in his capacity as the leader of the Board of Coadjutors. There was therefore a clear division between the policies of Takauji and his brother Tadayoshi.

Conflict can thus be said to have emerged as a result of having two heads of state whose policies contradicted each other. The events which followed the incident testify to the extent to which the regime began to lose its support. Deep divisions between members of the Ashikaga family strengthened the opposition. Both of the pillars of the Muromachi regime, Tadayoshi and Takauji, enacted token submissions to the Southern Court to push their own agendas: Tadayoshi in his desire to destroy the Kō brothers, and Takauji in his desire to defeat Tadayoshi. Ironically, even though the Southern Court was the enemy, it was used as the justification by regime members to attack each other.

=== Effects ===
One of the main effects of the Disturbance was the re-invigoration of the war effort of the Southern Court. To a large extent its renewed offensive was made possible by turncoats from the Muromachi regime. The imperialist offensive of 1352 directed against Takauji in Kamakura was made possible by the vast numbers of former adherents of Tadayoshi who became supporters of the imperialist leader Nitta Yoshimune. The imperialist offensive against Kyoto in 1353 was made possible through the defection of the shugo lord Yamana Tokiuji. Tadayoshi's adopted son Ashikaga Tadafuyu is an outstanding example of defection: he became the leader of the western armies of the Southern Court during the imperialist offensives against Kyoto in 1353 and 1354.

The end of the Disturbance on the other hand eliminated the sharing of power between the two Ashikaga brothers putting it all into Takauji's hands, strengthening his position and ultimately that of the early Muromachi shogunate as a whole.

== See also ==
- Glossary of Japanese history
- List of Japanese battles
