= Ōan =

Period of Japanese history (1368–1375)

Ōan (応安), also romanized as Ō-an, was a Japanese era name (年号, nengō, lit. year name) of the Northern Court during the Era of Northern and Southern Courts after Jōji and before Eiwa. This period spanned the years from February 1368 through February 1375. The emperors in Kyoto were Emperor Go-Kōgon (後光厳天皇, Go-Kōgon-tennō) and Emperor Go-En'yū (後円融天皇, Go-En'yū-tennō) The Southern Court rival in Yoshino during this time-frame was Emperor Chōkei (長慶天皇, Chōkei-tennō).

== Nanboku-chō overview ==
The Imperial seats during the Nanboku-chō period were in relatively close proximity, but geographically distinct. They were conventionally identified as: Northern capital : Kyoto; Southern capital : Yoshino.

During the Meiji period, an Imperial decree dated March 3, 1911 established that the legitimate reigning monarchs of this period were the direct descendants of Emperor Go-Daigo through Emperor Go-Murakami, whose Southern Court (南朝, nanchō) had been established in exile in Yoshino, near Nara.

Until the end of the Edo period, the militarily superior pretender-Emperors supported by the Ashikaga shogunate had been mistakenly incorporated in Imperial chronologies despite the undisputed fact that the Imperial Regalia were not in their possession.

This illegitimate Northern Court (北朝, hokuchō) had been established in Kyoto by Ashikaga Takauji.

== Change of era ==
- 1368, also called Ōan gannen (応安元年): The new era name was created to mark an event or series of events. The previous era ended and the new one commenced in Jōji 7.

In this time frame, Shōhei (1346–1370), Kentoku (1370–1372) and Bunchū (1372–1375) were Southern Court equivalent nengō.

== Events of the Ōan era ==
- 1368 (Ōan 1): The Southern Court proclaims Emperor Chōkei's succession to the vacancy created by the death of Emperor Go-Murakami.
- 1369 (Ōan 2): Kusunoki Masanori defects to Ashikaga.
- 1370 (Ōan 3): Imagawa Sadayo sent to subdue Kyūshū.
- 1371 (Ōan 4): Attempts to arrange truce.
- 1373-1406 (Ōan 6 – Ōei 13): Embassies between China and Japan.
- 1374 (Ōan 7): En'yū ascends northern throne.

== Notes ==
Preceded by Jōji	Era or nengō Ōan; 1368–1375	Succeeded by Eiwa
