= Jōwa (Muromachi period) =

Japanese era from 1345 to 1350

Jōwa (貞和) was a Japanese era or nengō which was promulgated by the more militarily powerful two Imperial rival courts during the Era of Northern and Southern Courts (南北朝時代, nanbokuchō jidai). This nengō came after Kōei and before Kannō and lasted from October 1345 through February 1350. The emperor in Kyoto was Emperor Kōmyō (光明天皇, Kōmyō-tennō). Go-Kōgon's Southern Court rival in Yoshino during this time-frame was Emperor Go-Murakami (後村上天皇, Go-Murakami-tennō).

== Nanboku-chō overview ==
The Imperial seats during the Nanboku-chō period were in relatively close proximity, but geographically distinct. They were conventionally identified as: Northern capital: Kyoto; Southern capital: Yoshino.

During the Meiji period, an Imperial decree dated March 3, 1911, established that the legitimate reigning monarchs of this period were the direct descendants of Emperor Go-Daigo through Emperor Go-Murakami, whose Southern Court (南朝, nanchō) had been established in exile in Yoshino, near Nara.

Until the end of the Edo period, the militarily superior pretender-Emperors supported by the Ashikaga shogunate had been mistakenly incorporated in Imperial chronologies despite the undisputed fact that the Imperial Regalia were not in their possession.

This illegitimate Northern Court (北朝, hokuchō) had been established in Kyoto by Ashikaga Takauji.

== Change of era ==
- 1345, also called Jōwa gannen (貞和元年): The new era name was created to mark an event or series of events. The previous era ended and the new one commenced in Kōei 2.

In this time frame, Kōkoku (1340-1346) and Shōhei (1346-1370) were Southern Court equivalent nengō.

== Events of the Jōwa era ==
- 1346 (Jōwa 2, 2nd month): The kampaku Takatsukasa Morohira was relieved of his duties; and he was replaced by Nijō Yoshimoto.
- 1347 (Jōwa 3, 9th month): Nijō Yoshimoto was demoted from his high office as Kampaku; and he was instead given the title and responsibilities of sadaijin.
- 1349 (Jōwa 5):— Go-Murakami flees to A'no; Ashikaga Tadayoshi and Kō no Moronao quarrel; Ashikaga Motouji, son of Takauji, appointed Kamakura Kanrei

== Notes ==
Preceded by Kōei	Era or nengō Jōwa; 1345–1350	Succeeded by Kannō
