= Enbun =

Japanese era from 1356 to 1361

Enbun (延文), also transcribed Embun, was a Japanese era name (年号, nengō, lit. year name) of the Northern Court during the Era of Northern and Southern Courts after Bunna and before Kōan. This period spanned the years from March 1356 through March 1361; The emperor in Kyoto was Emperor Go-Kōgon (後光厳天皇, Go-Kōgon-tennō). Go-Kōgon's Southern Court rival in Yoshino during this time-frame was Emperor Go-Murakami (後村上天皇, Go-Murakami-tennō)

== Nanboku-chō overview ==
The Imperial seats during the Nanboku-chō period were in relatively close proximity, but geographically distinct. They were conventionally identified as: Northern capital : Kyoto; Southern capital : Yoshino.

During the Meiji period, an Imperial decree dated March 3, 1911 established that the legitimate reigning monarchs of this period were the direct descendants of Emperor Go-Daigo through Emperor Go-Murakami, whose Southern Court (南朝, nanchō) had been established in exile in Yoshino, near Nara.

Until the end of the Edo period, the militarily superior pretender-Emperors supported by the Ashikaga shogunate had been mistakenly incorporated in Imperial chronologies despite undisputed recognition that the Imperial Regalia were not in their possession.

This illegitimate Northern Court (北朝, hokuchō) had been established in Kyoto by Ashikaga Takauji.

== Change of era ==
- 1356, also called Enbun gannen (延文元年): The new era name was created to mark an event or series of events. The previous era ended and the new one commenced in Bunna 5.

In this time frame, Shōhei (1346–1370) was the Southern Court equivalent nengō.

== Events of the Enbun era ==
- 1356 (Enbun 1, 7th month): Minamoto no Michisuke was advanced from the court rank of dainagon to naidaijin.
- 1356 (Enbun 1, 7th month): Ashikaga Yoshinori is raised to the second rank of the third class in the court hierarchy.
- 1357 (Enbun 2, 2nd month): Emperor Go-Murakami, who had captured former-Emperor Kōgon, former-Emperor Kōmyō and former-Emperor Sukō in 1352, released all three of them and permitted their return from Yoshino to Kyoto.
- 1358 (Enbun 3): Death of Ashikaga Takauji; Ashikaga Yoshiakira appointed shōgun; dissention and defections in shogunate.

== Notes ==
Preceded by Bunna	Era or nengō Enbun; 1356–1361	Succeeded by Kōan
