= Jōji =

Period of Japanese history (1362–1368)

Jōji (貞治) was a Japanese era name (年号, nengō, lit. year name) of the Northern Court during the Era of Northern and Southern Courts after Kōan and before Ōan. This period spanned the years from September 1362 through February 1368. The emperor in Kyoto was Emperor Go-Kōgon (後光厳天皇, Go-Kōgon-tennō). Go-Kōgon's Southern Court rival in Yoshino during this time-frame was Emperor Go-Murakami (後村上天皇, Go-Murakami-tennō).

== Nanboku-chō overview ==
The Imperial seats during the Nanboku-chō period were in relatively close proximity, but geographically distinct. They were conventionally identified as: Northern capital : Kyoto; Southern capital : Yoshino.

During the Meiji period, an Imperial decree dated March 3, 1911 established that the legitimate reigning monarchs of this period were the direct descendants of Emperor Go-Daigo through Emperor Go-Murakami, whose Southern Court (南朝, nanchō) had been established in exile in Yoshino, near Nara.

Until the end of the Edo period, the militarily superior pretender-Emperors supported by the Ashikaga shogunate had been mistakenly incorporated in Imperial chronologies despite the undisputed fact that the Imperial Regalia were not in their possession.

This illegitimate Northern Court (北朝, hokuchō) had been established in Kyoto by Ashikaga Takauji.

== Change of era ==
- 1362, also called Jōji gannen (貞治元年): The new era name was created to mark an event or series of events. The previous era ended and the new one commenced in Kōan 2.

In this time frame, Shōhei (1346–1370) was a Southern Court equivalent nengō,

== Events of the Jōji era ==
- 1362 (Jōji 1): The era begins with Ashikaga Yoshiakira in control of Kyoto.
- 1365 (Jōji 4): Emperor Go-Daigo's son, Prince Kaneyoshi (also known as Kanenaga) gains control of Kyūshū.
- 1367 (Jōji 6): Kantō Kubō Ashikaga Motouji dies; Yoshiakira falls ill and cedes his position to his son.
- 1368 (Jōji 7): Yoshiakira's son, Ashikaga Yoshimitsu, becomes the third shōgun of what comest to be known as the Muromachi period.

== Notes ==
Preceded by Kōan	Era or nengō Jōji; 1362–1368	Succeeded by Ōan
