= Emperor Sukō =

Japanese Northern Emperor from 1348 to 1351

Emperor Sukō 崇光天皇
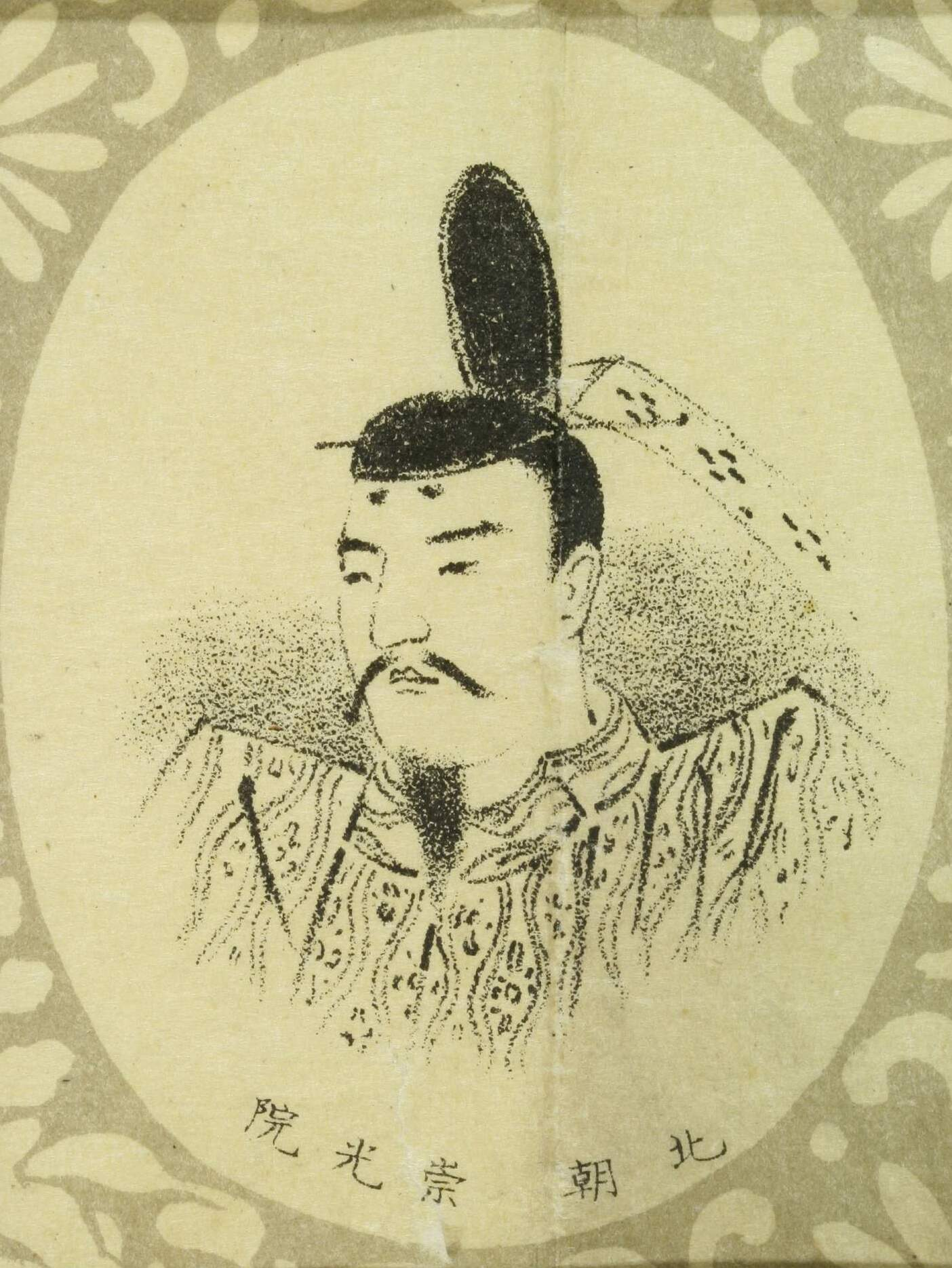

3rd Northern Emperor
- Reign: 18 November 1348 – 26 November 1351
- Enthronement: 3 February 1350
- Predecessor: Kōmyō
- Successor: Go-Kōgon
- Born: 25 May 1334
- Died: 31 January 1398 (aged 63)
- Burial: Daikōmyō-ji no Misasagi (大光明寺陵)
- Issue: See list
Posthumous name
- Tsuigō: Emperor Sukō (崇光院 or 崇光天皇)
- House: Imperial House of Japan
- Father: Emperor Kōgon
- Mother: Sanjō Shūshi

Emperor Sukō (崇光天皇, Sukō Tennō) (25 May 1334 – 31 January 1398) was the third of the Emperors of Northern Court during the Period of the Northern and Southern Courts in Japan. According to pre-Meiji scholars, his reign spanned the years from 1348 through 1351.

== Genealogy ==
His personal name was originally Masuhito (益仁), but was later changed to Okihito (興仁).

His father was Emperor Kōgon. His predecessor, Emperor Kōmyō was his uncle, the younger brother of Emperor Kōgon.

- Lady-in-waiting: Niwata (Minamoto) Motoko (庭田（源）資子; d.1394), Niwata Shigemoto's daughter
  - First son: Imperial Prince Fushimi-no-miya Yoshihito (1351–1416; 伏見宮栄仁親王) (Founder of Fushimi-no-miya house, collateral branch of the Imperial Family and included in the Succession to the Japanese throne until 1947)
  - Second son: Imperial Prince Priest Koshin (1358–1391; 興信法親王)
- Court Lady: Anfuku-dono-Naishi (安福殿女御)
- Consort: Sanjō-no-Tsubone (三条局)
  - First daughter: Princess Suiho (瑞宝女王)
  - Third son: Imperial Prince Priest Kojo (弘助法親王)

== Events of Sukō's life ==
Sukō occupied the Chrysanthemum Throne from 18 November 1348 until 22 November 1351.

In 1348, he became Crown Prince. In the same year, he became Northern Emperor upon the abdication of Emperor Kōmyō. Although Emperor Kōgon ruled as a cloistered Emperor, the rivalry between Ashikaga Takauji and Ashikaga Tadayoshi began, and in 1351, Takauji returned to the allegiance of the Southern Court, forcing Emperor Sukō to abdicate. This was intended to reunify the Imperial Line.

However, the peace soon fell apart, and in April 1352, the Southern Dynasty evacuated Kyoto, abducting with them Retired (Northern) Emperors Emperor Kōgon and Emperor Kōmyō as well as Emperor Sukō and the Crown Prince Tadahito. Because of this, Takauji made Emperor Kōgon's second son Imperial Prince Iyahito emperor (First Fushimi-no-miya).

Returning to Kyoto in 1357, Emperor Sukō's son Imperial Prince Yoshihito began to work with the Bakufu to be named Crown Prince, but the Bakufu instead decided to make Emperor Go-Kōgon's son (the future Emperor Go-En'yū) Crown Prince instead.

In 1398, Emperor Sukō died. But, 30 years after his death, in 1428, his great-grandson Hikohito (彦仁), as the adopted son of Emperor Shōkō, became Emperor Go-Hanazono, fulfilling Sukō's dearest wish. Sukō is enshrined at the Daikōmyōji no misasagi (大光明寺陵) in Fushimi-ku, Kyoto.

== Eras during his reign ==
Nanboku-chō Southern court

- Eras as reckoned by legitimate Court (as determined by Meiji rescript)
  - Shōhei

Nanboku-chō Northern court

- Eras as reckoned by pretender Court (as determined by Meiji rescript)
  - Jōwa
  - Kan'ō

== Southern Court rivals ==
- Emperor Go-Murakami

== Ancestry ==
Ancestors of Emperor Sukō

8. Emperor Fushimi (1265–1317)
4. Emperor Go-Fushimi (1288–1336)
9. Itsutsuji Tsuneko (d. 1324)
2. Emperor Kōgon (1313–1364)
10. Saionji Kinhira (1264–1315)
5. Saionji Neishi/Yasuko (1292–1357)
11.Fujiwara Kaneko
1. Emperor Sukō
12.Ōgimachisanjō Sanemi (1264-?)
6. Ōgimachisanjō Kinhide (1285–1363)
13. Seikai
3. Ōgimachisanjō Hideko (1311–1353)

== See also ==
- Emperor of Japan
- List of Emperors of Japan
- Imperial cult

== Notes ==
Japanese Imperial kamon — a stylized chrysanthemum blossom

Regnal titles
Preceded by Emperor Kōmyō	Northern Emperor; 1348–1351	Succeeded by Emperor Go-Kōgon
