= Prince Narinaga =

Military ruler of Japan from 1335 to 1337

Prince Nariyoshi 成良親王

Shōgun
- In office: 1335–1337
- Predecessor: Prince Moriyoshi
- Successor: Prince Okiyoshi (Southern Court); Ashikaga Takauji (Northern Court)
- Born: 1326
- Died: 1337 or January 21, 1344
- Father: Emperor Go-Daigo
- Mother: Ano Renshi

Prince Narinaga (成良親王, Narinaga Shinnō; also called Prince Nariyoshi) (1326 – c. 1337–44) reigned from 1334 to 1338 and was one of two Sei-i Taishōguns during the Kenmu Restoration. He was also Crown Prince in 1336 (for one month).

== Family ==
Prince Narinaga was a son of Emperor Go-Daigo and Fujiwara no Renshi (藤原廉子, also called Ano Renshi 阿野廉子), daughter of Ano Kinkado. His full brothers were Crown Prince Tsunenaga and Emperor Go-Murakami.

== Life ==
On 17 November 1336 Prince Narinaga became Crown Prince to Emperor Kōmyō. However, according to some accounts, Ashikaga Takauji had the prince killed in 1337 when Go-Daigo continued to resist.

Other accounts have Narinaga placed with Konoe Mototsugu after deposal and dying in 1344 (according to Diary by Nakahara no Moromori, 師守記).
