= Ashikaga Yoshiakira =

Military ruler of Japan from 1358 to 1367

- 足利 義詮
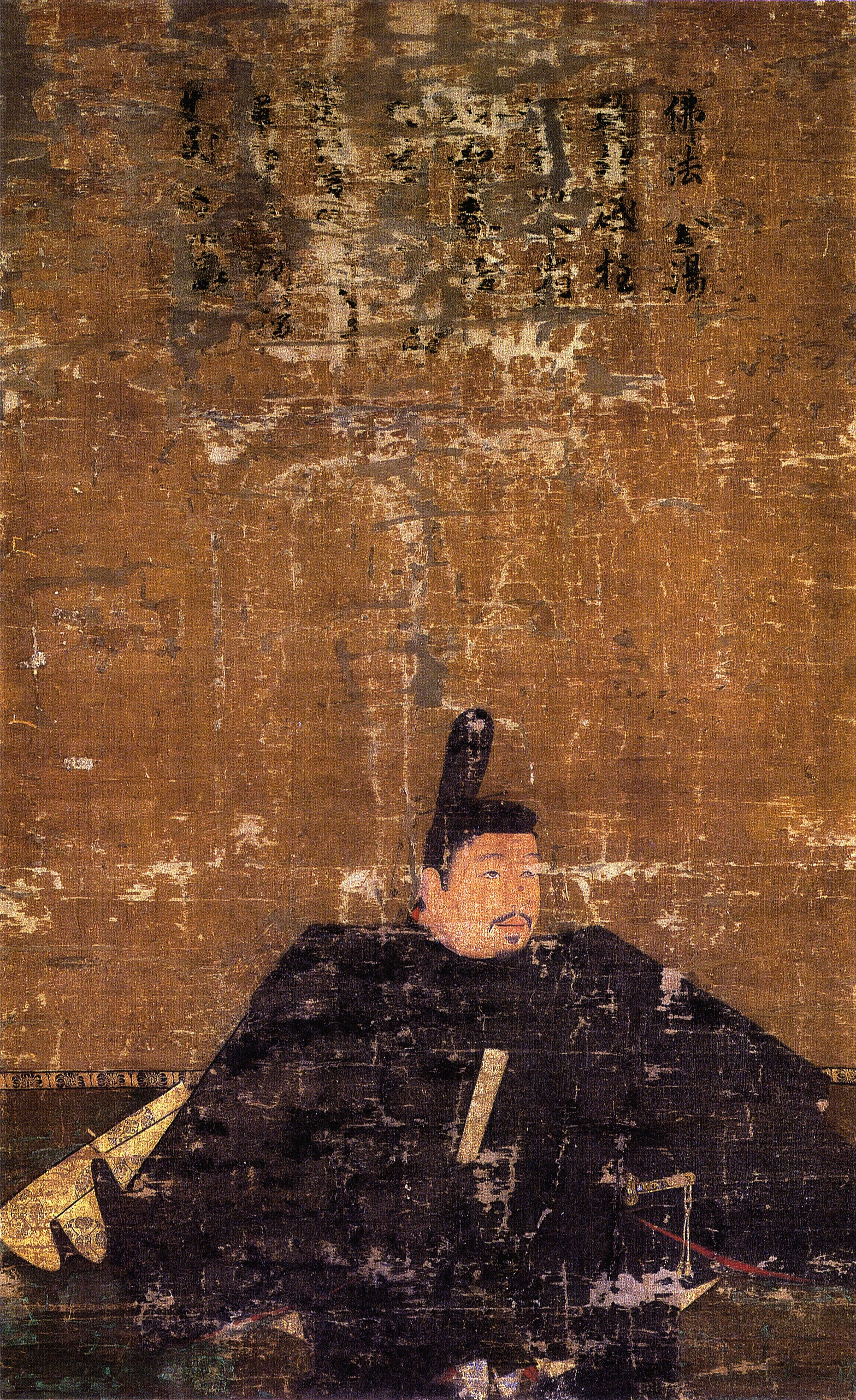

Shōgun
- In office 1358–1367
- Monarch: Go-Murakami
- Preceded by: Ashikaga Takauji
- Succeeded by: Ashikaga Yoshimitsu

Personal details
- Born: July 4, 1330
- Died: December 28, 1367 (aged 37)
- Spouse: Shibukawa Kōshi
- Children: Ashikaga Yoshimitsu
- Parents: Ashikaga Takauji; Akahashi Tōshi
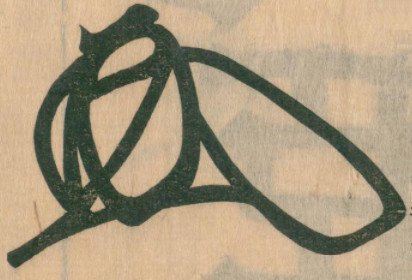
- Signature

Ashikaga Yoshiakira (足利 義詮; July 4, 1330 – December 28, 1367) was the second shōgun of the Ashikaga shogunate who reigned from 1358 to 1367 during the Muromachi period of Japan. Yoshiakira was the son of the founder and first shōgun of the Muromachi shogunate, Ashikaga Takauji. His mother was Akahashi Tōshi (赤橋登子), also known as Hōjō Nariko.

His childhood name was Senjuō (千寿王). He spent his childhood in Kamakura as a hostage of the Hōjō clan. His father Takauji joined forces with the banished Emperor Go-Daigo. Go-Daigo revolted against the Kamakura shogunate in the Kenmu Restoration. Yoshiakira assisted Nitta Yoshisada (1301–1338) in his attack on the Kamakura shogunate. During the Nanboku-cho period, several Loyalist occupations of Kyoto in the 1350s were successfully retaken by Yoshiakira.

== Notable events ==
In 1349, an internal disturbance of the government caused Yoshiakira to be called back to Kyoto, where he found himself named as Takauji's heir. On 5 April 1352, Loyalist forces led by Kitabatake Akiyoshi, Kusunoki Masanori and Chigusa Akitsune occupied Kyoto for 20 days before Yoshiakira was able to retake the city. Loyalist forces led by Masanori and Yamana Tokiuji captured Kyoto again in July 1353, but were repulsed by Yoshiakira in August. Eighteen months later, Loyalist forces led by Momonoi, Tadafuyu, and Yamana captured Kyoto again and held it for three months, but the city was retaken on 25 April 1355 by the combined forces of Takauji and Yoshiakira. Yoshiakira succeeded his father Takauji as Sei-i Taishōgun after his death in 1358.

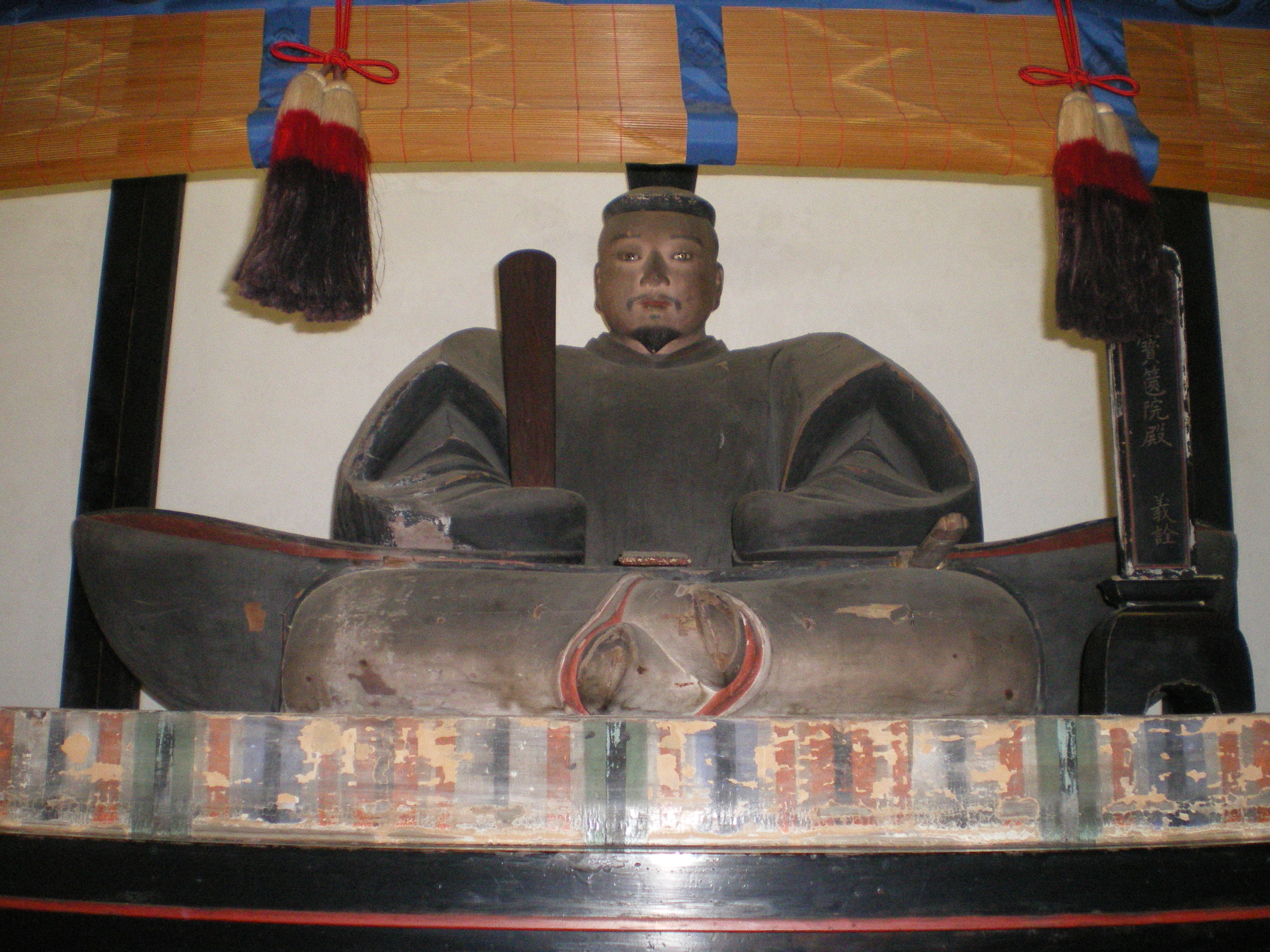
Statue of Yoshiakira at Tōji-in.

Takauji died in 1358, his son Yoshiakira is then appointed shōgun, which leads to dissention and defections in shogunate. In 1362, Hosokawa Kiyouji and Kusunoki Masanori attack Kyoto, Yoshiakira flees, but regains the capital in twenty days. Later, Emperor Go-Daigo's son, Prince Kaneyoshi (also known as Kanenaga, leader of Ashikaga clan's archrival court) gains control of Kyushu in 1365. Yoshiakira falls ill in 1367 and cedes his position to his son.

Some months after his death he was succeeded by his son Ashikaga Yoshimitsu, who became the third shōgun in 1368. Yoshiakira was posthumously named 宝篋院 (Hōkyōin), and his grave is at Tōji-in, Kyoto, at the same site as his father's grave.

== Family ==
Parents:

- Father: Ashikaga Takauji (足利 尊氏, August 18, 1305 – June 7, 1358)
- Mother: Akahashi Toshi (赤橋 登子; 1306– 4 May 1365)

Consort and issue:

- Wife: Shibukawa Koshi (澀川幸子; 1332–1392)
  - Son: Senju-ō (千寿王)
- Concubine: Ki no Yoshiko (纪良子; 1336–1413)
  - Son: Ashikaga Yoshimitsu (足利 義満, September 25, 1358 – May 31, 1408)
  - Son: Ashikaga Mitsuakira (足利満詮; 6 July 1364 – 29 June 1418)
  - Son: Seiso (清祖)

== Eras of Yoshiakira's bakufu ==
The years in which Yoshiakira was shōgun are more specifically identified by more than one era name or nengō.

Nanboku-chō southern court

- Eras as reckoned by legitimate Court (as determined by Meiji rescript):
  - Shōhei (1346–1370)

Nanboku-chō northern Court

- Eras as reckoned by pretender Court (as determined by Meiji rescript):
  - Enbun (1356–1361)
  - Kōan (1361–1362)
  - Jōji (1362–1368)

== See also ==
- Ashikaga Tadayoshi, paternal uncle of Ashikaga Yoshiakira

== Sources ==
- Ackroyd, Joyce I. (1982) Lessons from History: the Tokushi Yoron. Brisbane: University of Queensland Press. ISBN 9780702214851; OCLC 7574544
- Sansom, George (1978) [1961]. A History of Japan, 1334–1615. Palo Alto CA: Stanford University Press. ISBN 0-8047-0525-9.
- Titsingh, Isaac. (1834). Nihon Ōdai Ichiran; ou, Annales des empereurs du Japon. Paris: Royal Asiatic Society, Oriental Translation Fund of Great Britain and Ireland. OCLC 585069

Preceded by Ashikaga Takauji	Shōgun: Ashikaga Yoshiakira; 1358–1367	Succeeded by Ashikaga Yoshimitsu
