= Hōkōshū =

Hōkōshū (奉公衆) were high-ranking samurai guard-officials and close retainers (gokenin) to the Ashikaga shogun in Muromachi period Japan. The hōkōshū were made up from five guard groups, and thus were also known as gobanshū (五番衆) or simply banshū (番衆). Their role was to restrict the power of powerful regional shugo daimyo and increase their dependence on the central government.

== Overview ==
The hōkōshū served the shogun directly as close retainers (gokenin), as opposed to the retainers of daimyo, and ranked above the omemie, a samurai retainer with the right to hold an audience with the shogun.

The hōkōshū were organized into five guard groups called gobanshū, and were headed by a head of guards (bantō). Their daily duties included various duties inside the shogunal palace and accompanying the shogun when he went out. During wartime, the hōkōshū departed to the front as close bodyguards to the shogun.

They were also appointed as managers to regional territories under shogun's direct control (goryōsho), and were given the right of no-entry by shugo governor authorities (shugo funyū no ken) as well as the right collect field tax and to pay taxes straight to Kyoto (kyōsei) without paying tax to the shugo. The territories of hōkōshū were mainly located in Tōkai and western Tōsandō. As the hōkōshū were independent from the shugo, they were a nuisance to the territorial formation of the shugo daimyo. However, there were also hōkōshū who were under the governance of the shugo while simultaneously supporting the shogunate.

The hōkōshū were appointed from branches of shugo daimyo families, close retainers, members of the Ashikaga clan, and regional lords (kokujin ryōshū). According to an analysis by Toyohiko Fukuda, many hōkōshū were appointed from the more rural regions, such as Mikawa, Hokuriku, San'yō and San'in, and the number of appointees from the capital region Kinai was surprisingly low.

== History ==
In the beginning of the Muromachi period, the shugo daimyo of the newly established Ashikaga shogunate were at a constant political dispute against each other, and in 1379, the shogunal deputy (kanrei) Hosokawa Yoriyuki fell amidst the chaotic situation. After this during the Ōei era, in an attempt to restrict the power of the shugo, Ashikaga Yoshimitsu (1368–1394) established a new system of shogunal horse guards, the umamawari.

At the time of the Ashikaga Yoshimochi (1394–1423), the shogunate was still largely dependent on the military power of two powerful samurai families, the Hatakeyama clan and Ōuchi clan. Although there already was a system of close shogunal guards (tōsanhōkō), during the rule of Ashikaga Yoshinori (1428–1441), the shogun began to strengthen his power against the shugo daimyo who had gradually become more and more independent, and thus, a new system of shogunal guards called hōkōshū was established during the rule of Ashikaga Yoshihisa (1474–1489). In the beginning of the Ashikaga shogunate, the hōkōshū took on the duties of the inner palace guards (gosho uchiban) of the Kamakura shogunate.

The hōkōshū existed until the Ōnin War (1467-1477) when Ashikaga Yoshitane departed to Kawachi Province, but effectively collapsed during the political change of Meiō. After this, a new different system of shogunal guards, the tsumeshū was established.

== Notable hōkōshū ==
- Nikaidō clan
- Soga clan
- Kobayakawa clan

== See also ==
- Hatamoto
- Ashikaga shogunate
