= Bunna =

Japanese era from 1352 to 1356

Bunna (文和), also romanized as Bunwa, was a Japanese era name (年号, nengō, lit. year name) of the Northern Court during the Era of Northern and Southern Courts after Kannō and before Enbun. This period spanned the years from September 1352 through March 1356. The emperor in Kyoto was Emperor Go-Kōgon (後光厳天皇). Go-Kōgon's Southern Court rival in Yoshino during this time-frame was Emperor Go-Murakami (後村上天皇).

== Nanboku-chō overview ==
The Imperial seats during the Nanboku-chō period were in relatively close proximity, but geographically distinct. They were conventionally identified as: Northern capital : Kyoto; Southern capital : Yoshino.

During the Meiji period, an Imperial decree dated March 3, 1911 established that the legitimate reigning monarchs of this period were the direct descendants of Emperor Go-Daigo through Emperor Go-Murakami, whose Southern Court (南朝, nanchō) had been established in exile in Yoshino, near Nara.

Until the end of the Edo period, the militarily superior pretender-Emperors supported by the Ashikaga shogunate had been mistakenly incorporated in Imperial chronologies though it was acknowledged that the Imperial Regalia were not in their possession.

This illegitimate Northern Court (北朝, hokuchō) had been established in Kyoto by Ashikaga Takauji.

== Change of era ==
- 1352, also called Bunna gannen (文和元年): The new era name was created to mark the accession of Emperor Go-Kōgon. The previous era ended and the new one commenced in Kannō 3.

In this time frame, Shōhei (1346–1370) was the Southern Court equivalent nengō.

== Events of the Bunna era ==
- 1352 (Bunna 1, 11th month): The grandfather of the emperor is advanced from the rank of dainagon to nadaijin.
- 1353 (Bunna 2): Kyoto occupied by southern forces under Yamana Tokiuji; and the capital was retaken by the Ashikaga.
- 1354 (Bunna 3): Takauji flees with Go-Kōgon; Kitabatake Chikafusa dies.
- 1355 (Bunna 4): Kyoto taken by southern army; Kyoto retaken again by the Ashikaga forces.

== Notes ==
Preceded by Kannō	Era or nengō Bunna; 1352–1356	Succeeded by Enbun
