= Kannō =

Japanese era from 1350 to 1352

Kannō (観応), also sometimes romanized as Kan'ō, was a Japanese era name (年号, nengō, lit. year name) of the Northern Court during the Era of Northern and Southern Courts after Jōwa and before Bunna. This period spanned the years from February 1350 through September 1352. The emperor in Kyoto was Emperor Sukō (崇光天皇, Sukō-tennō). Go-Kōgon's Southern Court rival in Yoshino during this time-frame was Emperor Go-Murakami (後村上天皇, Go-Murakami-tennō).

== Nanboku-chō overview ==
The Imperial seats during the Nanboku-chō period were in relatively close proximity, but geographically distinct. They were conventionally identified as: Northern capital : Kyoto; Southern capital : Yoshino.

During the Meiji period, an Imperial decree dated March 3, 1911 established that the legitimate reigning monarchs of this period were the direct descendants of Emperor Go-Daigo through Emperor Go-Murakami, whose Southern Court (南朝, nanchō) had been established in exile in Yoshino, near Nara.

Until the end of the Edo period, the militarily superior pretender-Emperors supported by the Ashikaga shogunate had been mistakenly incorporated in Imperial chronologies despite the undisputed fact that the Imperial Regalia were not in their possession.

This illegitimate Northern Court (北朝, hokuchō) had been established in Kyoto by Ashikaga Takauji.

== Change of era ==
- 1350, also called Kannō gannen (観応元年): The new era name was created to mark an event or series of events. The previous era ended and the new one commenced in Jōwa 6.

In this time frame, Shōhei (1346–1370) was the Southern Court equivalent nengō.

== Events of the Kannō era ==
- 1350 (Kannō 1, 10th month): Yoshinori guarded Kyoto.
- 1350 (Kannō 1): Tadayoshi, excluded from administration, turns priest; Tadayoshi's adopted son, Ashikaga Tadafuyu is wrongly repudiated as a rebel.
- 1351 (Kannō 2): Tadayoshi joins Southern Court, southern army takes Kyoto; truce, Takauji returns to Kyoto; Tadayoshi and Takauji reconciled; Kō no Moronao and Kō no Moroyasu are exiled.
- 1350–1352 (Kannō 2–3): Armed conflict, variously known as the Kannō disturbance or Kannō incident (観応擾乱, Kannō Jōran) or Kannō no juran, developed from antagonism between Shōgun Ashikaga Takauji and his brother, Ashikaga Tadayoshi. Disagreement about the influence of Kō no Moronao diminished after death of Moronao. Tadayoshi was ordered to relocate to Kamakura. The brothers eventually reconciled before Tadayoshi's death in 1352.

== Notes ==
Preceded by Jōwa	Era or nengō Kannō; 1350–1352	Succeeded by Bunna
