= Ashikaga Tadayoshi =

Japanese samurai general (1306-1352)

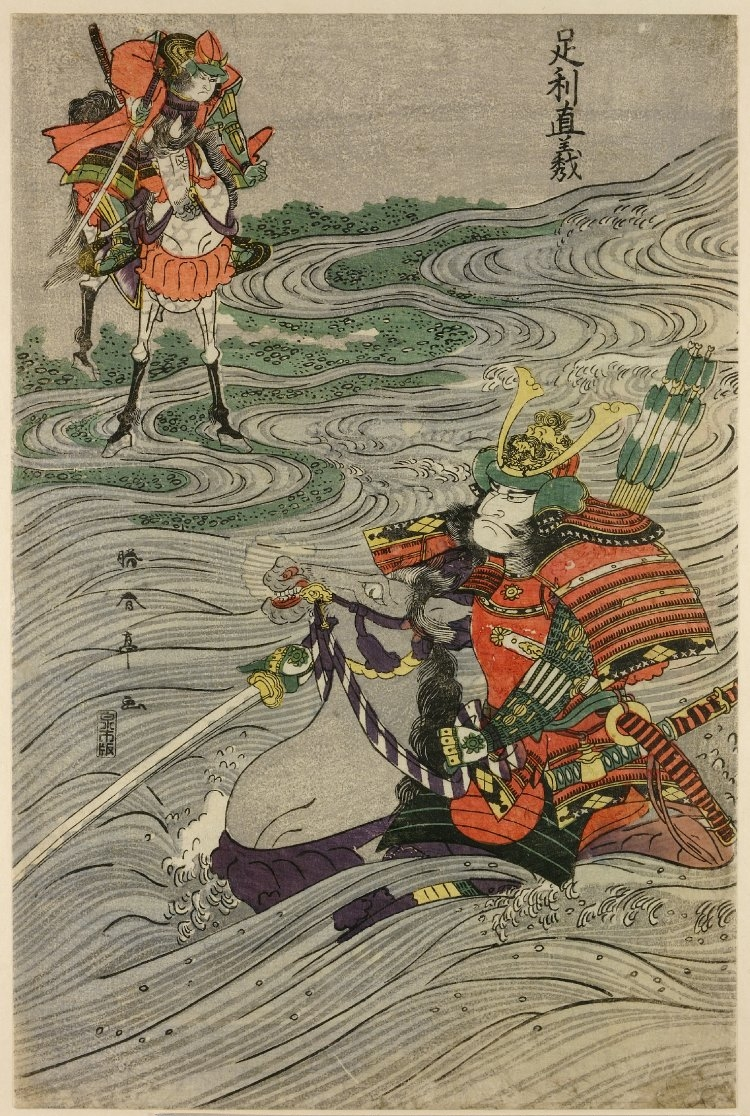
Ashikaga Tadayoshi depicted in an Edo period print

Ashikaga Tadayoshi (足利 直義; 1306 – March 13, 1352, Kamakura, Japan) was a Japanese samurai general of the Northern and Southern Courts period (1337–92) of Japanese history and a close associate of his elder brother Takauji, the first Muromachi shōgun. Son of Ashikaga Sadauji and Uesugi Kiyoko, daughter of Uesugi Yorishige, the same mother as Takauji, he was a pivotal figure of the chaotic transition period between the Kamakura and Muromachi shogunates. Tadayoshi is today considered a military and administrative genius and the true architect of many of his elder brother's successes. In contemporary chronicles he is rarely called with his name, but is instead called either gosho (御所) or Daikyū-ji-dono (大休寺殿) from the name of his family temple. His posthumous name was Kozan Egen (古山慧源).

== Biography ==
The Ashikaga were a samurai family from Kamakura having blood ties with the Seiwa Genji, Minamoto no Yoritomo's clan. Unlike his brother Takauji, Tadayoshi took no part in the Kamakura shogunate's political activities until the Genkō War (1331–1333), a civil war whose conclusion (the Siege of Kamakura (1333)) marks the end of the Kamakura period and the beginning of the most turbulent period in Japan's history, the Muromachi era.

Like his brother, Tadayoshi resolutely abandoned the Kamakura shogunate (de facto ruled by Hōjō clan) to ally himself with formerly expelled Emperor Go-Daigo during the Kenmu Restoration of 1333. When Go-Daigo had ascended to the throne in 1318, he had immediately manifested his intention to rule without interference from the military in Kamakura. The samurai class as a whole however was not ready to give away power, so the alliance between him and the Ashikaga was bound to be only temporary.

Go-Daigo wanted to re-establish his rule in Kamakura and the east of the country without sending there a shōgun, as this was seen, just a year from the fall of its shogunate, as still too dangerous. As a compromise, he sent his six-year-old son Prince Norinaga to Mutsu Province and nominated him Governor-General of the Mutsu and Dewa Provinces. In an obvious reply to this move, Tadayoshi, without an order from the Emperor escorted another of his sons, eleven-year-old Prince Nariyoshi (a.k.a. Narinaga) to Kamakura, where he installed him as governor of the Kōzuke Province with himself as a deputy and de facto ruler. The appointment of a warrior to such an important post was intended to demonstrate the Emperor that the samurai class was not ready for a purely civilian rule. Since he ruled without interference from Kyoto and the area in itself was in effect a miniature shogunate, this event can be considered the beginning of the Ashikaga shogunate.

In 1335, during the Nakasendai Rebellion led by Hōjō Tokiyuki Tadayoshi, being unable to defend the city, had to leave Kamakura in a rush. Not being in the position to take along another son of Go-Daigo's, Prince Morinaga, whom he had kept as a hostage for several months, rather than letting him go he decided to have him beheaded.

In Dec. 1335, Tadayoshi was defeated by imperial forces under the command of Nitta Yoshisada forcing his retreat to the Hakone mountains. However, with the aid of his brother Takauji, they were able to defeat Yoshisada at the battles of Sanoyama and Mishima. The brothers were then free to advance upon Kyoto.

Their occupation of Kyoto was short lived however, as forces loyal to Go-Daigo forced the brothers to flee west. In April 1336, Ashikaga Tadayoshi, "drove the enemy before him" helping his brother defeat the Kikuchi clan, allies of Go-Daigo. This Battle of Tatarahama (1336) occurred in Hakata Bay. The victory enabled Takauji to become master of Kyushu.

By May, Takauji was able to advance with a flotilla, reaching the environs of present-day Kobe in July. Tadayoshi followed in parallel with a land force.

Turning against Go-Daigo, Tadayoshi and Takauji set up a rival emperor in 1336 after defeating the Loyalists in the Battle of Minatogawa. Their Muromachi shogunate was founded in 1338.

Dividing power between them, Takauji took charge of military affairs and Tadayoshi of judicial and administrative matters.

Both Tadayoshi and Takauji were disciples of famous Zen master, intellectual and garden designer Musō Soseki, under which guidance the first would later become a Buddhist monk. It was partly because of Soseki's influence that the pre-existing Five Mountain System network of Zen temples was expanded and strengthened, first with the establishment of the Jissetsu, and later with that of the Ankoku-ji temple sub-networks. The creation of both systems is generally attributed wholly to Tadayoshi. It was also Soseki which famously wrote about the two brothers, describing Takauji as more apt to military pursuits, and Tadayoshi to government.

=== The Kannō disturbance and Tadayoshi's death ===
Ashikaga Takauji was the formally-appointed shogun but, having proved incapable of ruling the country (namely, Northern Court), for more than ten years Tadayoshi had governed in his stead. The relationship between the two brothers was however destined to be destroyed by the Kannō disturbance, an event which takes its name from the Kannō era (1350–1351) during which it took place, and which had very serious consequences for the entire country. Trouble between the two started when Takauji made Kō no Moronao his deputy shōgun. According to the Taiheiki, Tadayoshi didn't like Moronao and, every other effort to get rid of him having failed, tried to have him assassinated. According to the same source, his plot was discovered and he was therefore removed from the government. In any event, Tadayoshi in 1350 was forced by Moronao to leave the government, and take the tonsure under the monastic name Keishin.

In 1351 Tadayoshi rebelled and joined his brother's enemies, the Southern court, whose then emperor, Go-Murakami appointed him general of all his troops. In 1351 he defeated Takauji, occupied Kyoto, and entered Kamakura. During the same year his forces killed Moronao and his brother Moroyasu at Mikage (Settsu Province). The following year Tadayoshi's fortunes turned and he was defeated by Takauji at Sattayama. A reconciliation between the brothers proved to be brief; Tadayoshi was sandwiched by two of Takauji's armies and fled to the hills of Izu in 1352. Shortly after an ostensible second reconciliation, Tadayoshi was captured and confined in the Kamakura Jomyoji monastery, where he died suddenly in March. According to the Taiheiki, by poisoning.

Ashikaga Tadayoshi was buried at Kumano Daikyū-ji (熊野大休寺), a Buddhist temple which no longer exists, but whose ruins are now near Jōmyō-ji in Kamakura. The temple was founded on the grounds of Tadayoshi's former Kamakura residence, according to Jōmyō-ji's own records by Tadayoshi himself. According to the Kuge Nikkushū (空華日工集), the diary of priest Gidō Shūshin, in 1372 on the day of Tadayoshi's death Kamakura's Kubō Ashikaga Ujimitsu visited Daikyū-ji. The date of disappearance of the temple is unknown. He also adopted Ashikaga Tadafuyu, one of Takauji's biological sons, as his own.

== Family ==
- Father: Ashikaga Sadauji (1273–1331)
- Mother: Uesugi Kiyoko (1270–1343)
- Wife: Shibukawa Yoriko later Honkoin
- Son: Ashikaga Nishimaru (1347–1351)
- Adopted son: Ashikaga Tadafuyu (1327–1387)

== See also ==
- Ashikaga Takauji
- Kenmu Restoration
- Kamakura – The Muromachi and Edo periods
- Nanboku-chō period
