= Ashikaga Takauji =

Japanese Samurai, Daimyo and Military ruler of Japan from 1338 to 1358

- 足利 尊氏
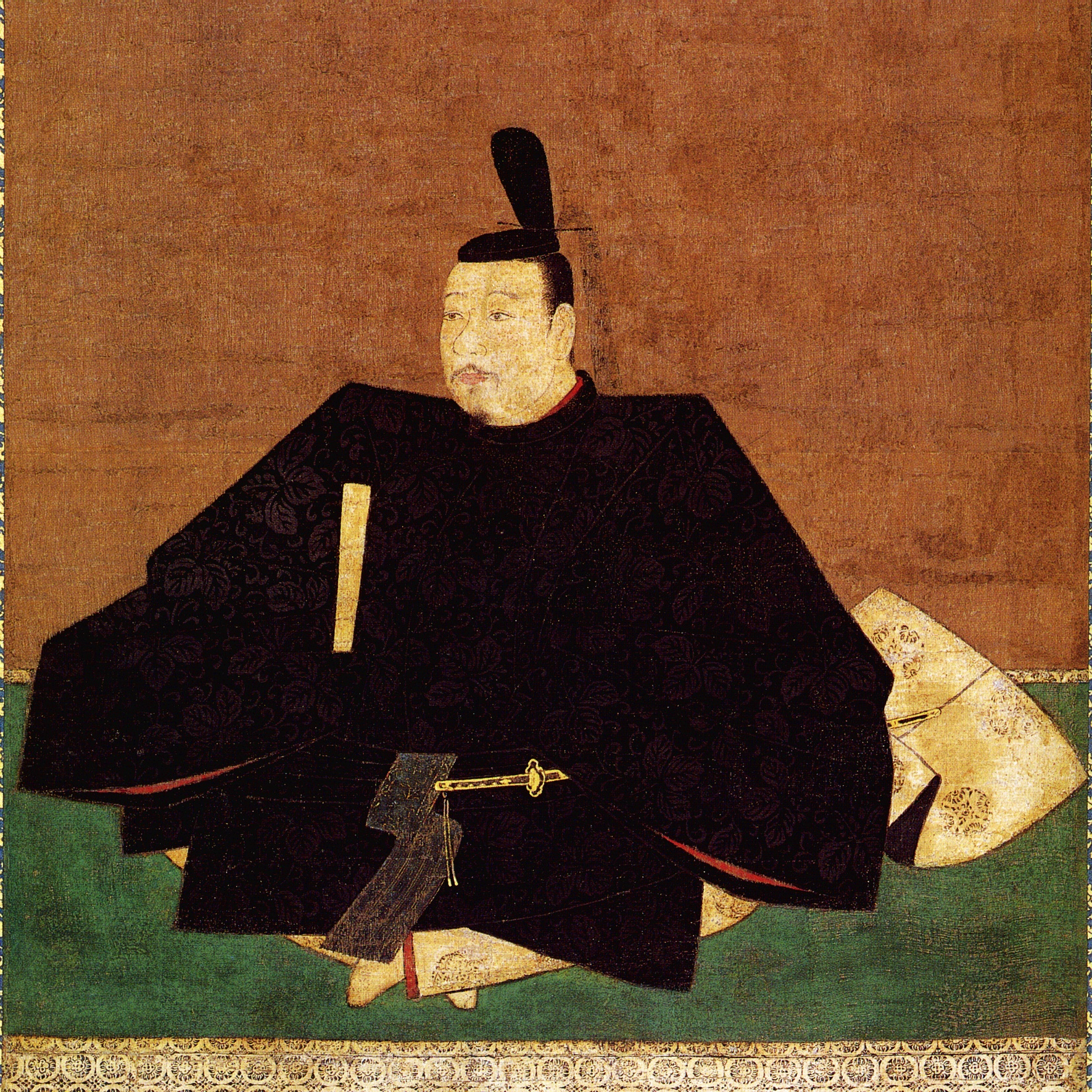

Shōgun of Ashikaga shogunate
- In office 1338–1358
- Monarchs: Go-Daigo; Go-Murakami
- Preceded by: Prince Narinaga (Kenmu Restoration)
- Succeeded by: Ashikaga Yoshiakira

Personal details
- Born: August 18, 1305 Uesugi-shō, Ayabe, Kyoto or Kamakura, Kanagawa, or Ashikaga, Tochigi, Japan
- Died: June 7, 1358 (aged 52) Masuya-chō, Kamigyō-ku, Kyoto, Japan
- Relations: Ashikaga Takayoshi (older brother); Ashikaga Tadayoshi (younger brother)
- Children: Ashikaga Yoshiakira; Ashikaga Motouji; Tazuō; Ashikaga Takewakamaru
- Parents: Ashikaga Sadauji; Uesugi Kiyoko

Military service
- Allegiance: Minamoto clan (Seiwa Genji)
- Branch/service: Ashikaga clan

Ashikaga Takauji (Note: Japanese pronunciation: [ä̀.ɕi̥.kä́.ɡä̀ | tä̀.kä́.ɯ̈̀.(ɟ̟͡)ʑì, -ŋä̀ | tä̀-, -ɡä́ tä́-, -ŋä́ tä́-]) (足利 尊氏; August 18, 1305 – June 7, 1358) also known as Minamoto no Takauji was a Japanese samurai, daimyo and the founder and first shōgun of the Ashikaga shogunate. His rule began in 1338, beginning the Muromachi period of Japan, and ended with his death in 1358. He was a male-line descendant of the samurai of the (Minamoto) Seiwa Genji line (meaning they were descendants of Emperor Seiwa) who had settled in the Ashikaga area of Shimotsuke Province, in present-day Tochigi Prefecture.

According to Zen master and intellectual Musō Soseki, who enjoyed his favor and collaborated with him, Takauji had three qualities: he kept his cool in battle and was not afraid of death, he was merciful and tolerant, and he was very generous with those below him.

Due to his rise to power by betraying his former masters, such as the Kamakura shogunate and Emperor Go-Daigo, he has a historical reputation as one of Japan's Three Great Villains (日本三大梟雄), a nickname which he shared with Dōkyō and Taira no Kiyomori; who also known with similar sobriquet as Japan's Three Great Villains by Confucian-minded history scholars due to their lack of loyalty to the throne. (Note: Not to be confused with Matsunaga Hisahide, Saitō Dōsan and Ukita Naoie from Sengoku period, who also shared similar group nickname of Japan's Three Great Villains due to their ambitious and treasonous personality, along with the habit of resorting to underhanded tactics and assassinations to eliminate their opposition.)

== Life ==
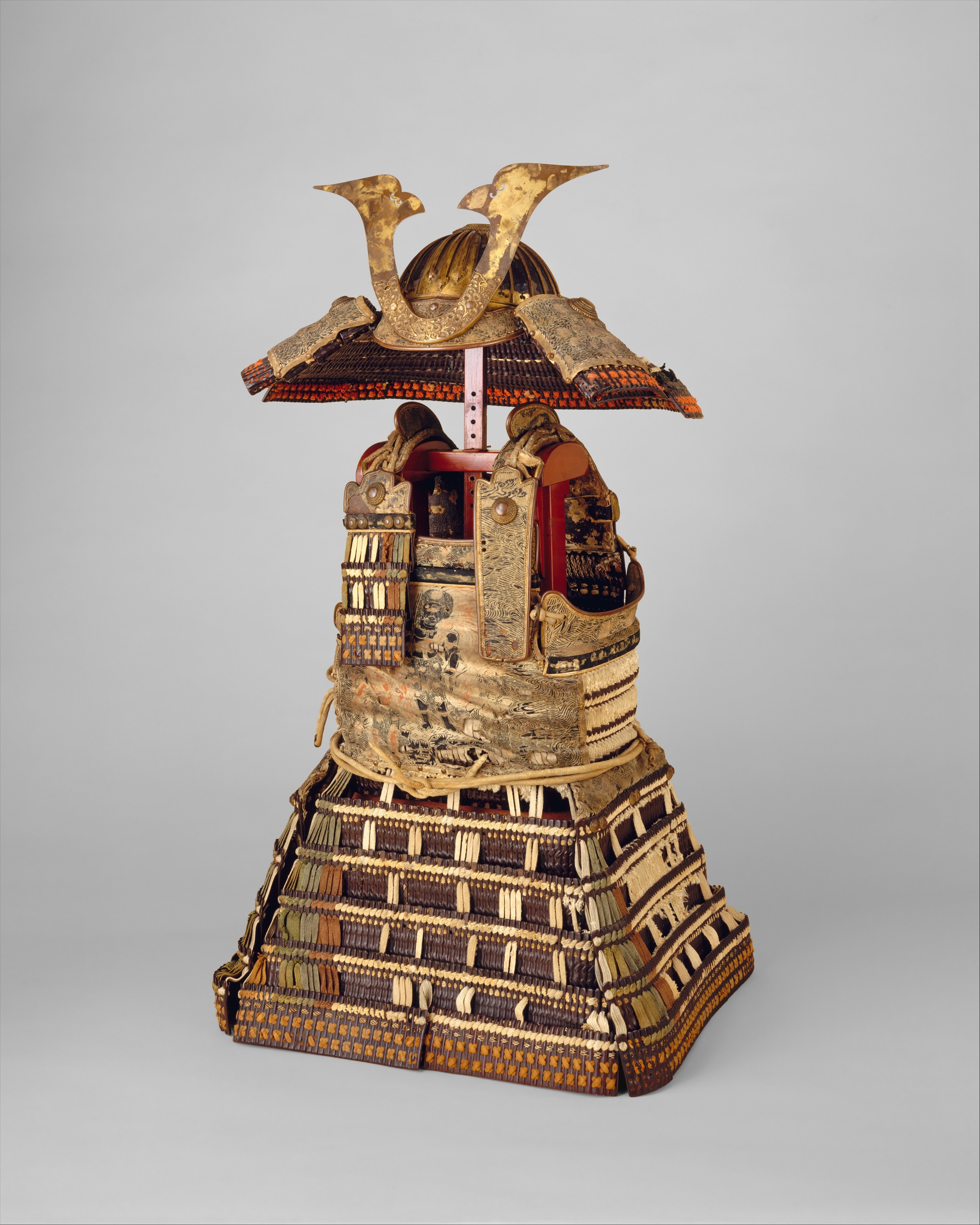
Ashikaga Takauji's ō-yoroi (shoulder guards, missing here). Kamakura or Muromachi period, early 14th century, Metropolitan Museum of Art

His childhood name was Matagorō (又太郎). Takauji was a general of the Kamakura shogunate sent to Kyoto in 1333 to put down the Genkō War which had started in 1331. After becoming increasingly disillusioned with the Kamakura shogunate over time, Takauji joined the banished Emperor Go-Daigo and Kusunoki Masashige, and seized Kyoto. Soon after, Nitta Yoshisada joined their cause, and laid siege to Kamakura. When the city fell to Nitta, the Shogunal regent, Hōjō Takatoki, and his clansmen committed suicide. This ended the Kamakura shogunate, as well as the Hōjō clan's power and influence. Go-Daigo was enthroned once more as emperor, reestablishing the primacy of the Imperial court in Kyoto and starting the so-called Kenmu Restoration.

However, shortly thereafter, the samurai clans became increasingly disillusioned with the reestablished imperial court, which sought to return to the social and political systems of the Heian period. As the new government made mistakes, Takauji gained favor among the samurai, who believed he could restore the feudal government. Prince Moriyoshi, also known as Morinaga, had the favor of the imperial court and was a rival to Takauji's political ambitions. In July 1334, Takauji heard a rumor that Moriyoshi was planning to attack him, leading Takauji to send out armed men to defend his mansion. Months later, Takauji had Moriyoshi arrested and, in August 1335, had his brother Ashikaga Tadayoshi execute Moriyoshi.

Hōjō Tokiyuki, son of Takatoki, took the opportunity to start the Nakasendai rebellion to try to reestablish the shogunate in Kamakura in 1335. Takauji put down the rebellion and took Kamakura for himself. Taking up the cause of his fellow samurai, he claimed the title of Sei-i Taishōgun and allotted land to his followers without permission from the court. Takauji announced his allegiance to the imperial court, but Emperor Go-Daigo sent Nitta Yoshisada to reclaim Kamakura.

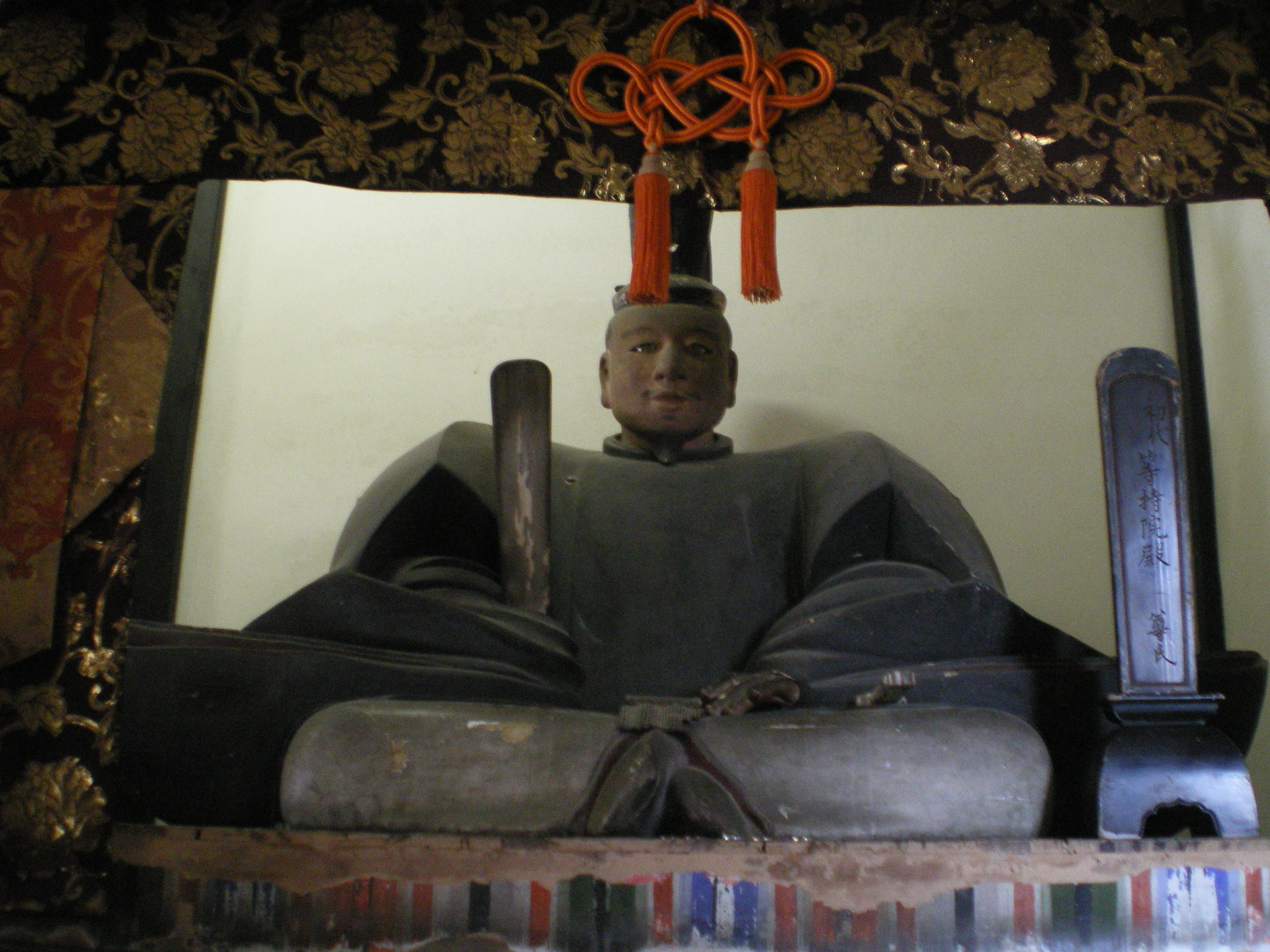
Wooden statue of Ashikaga Takauji.

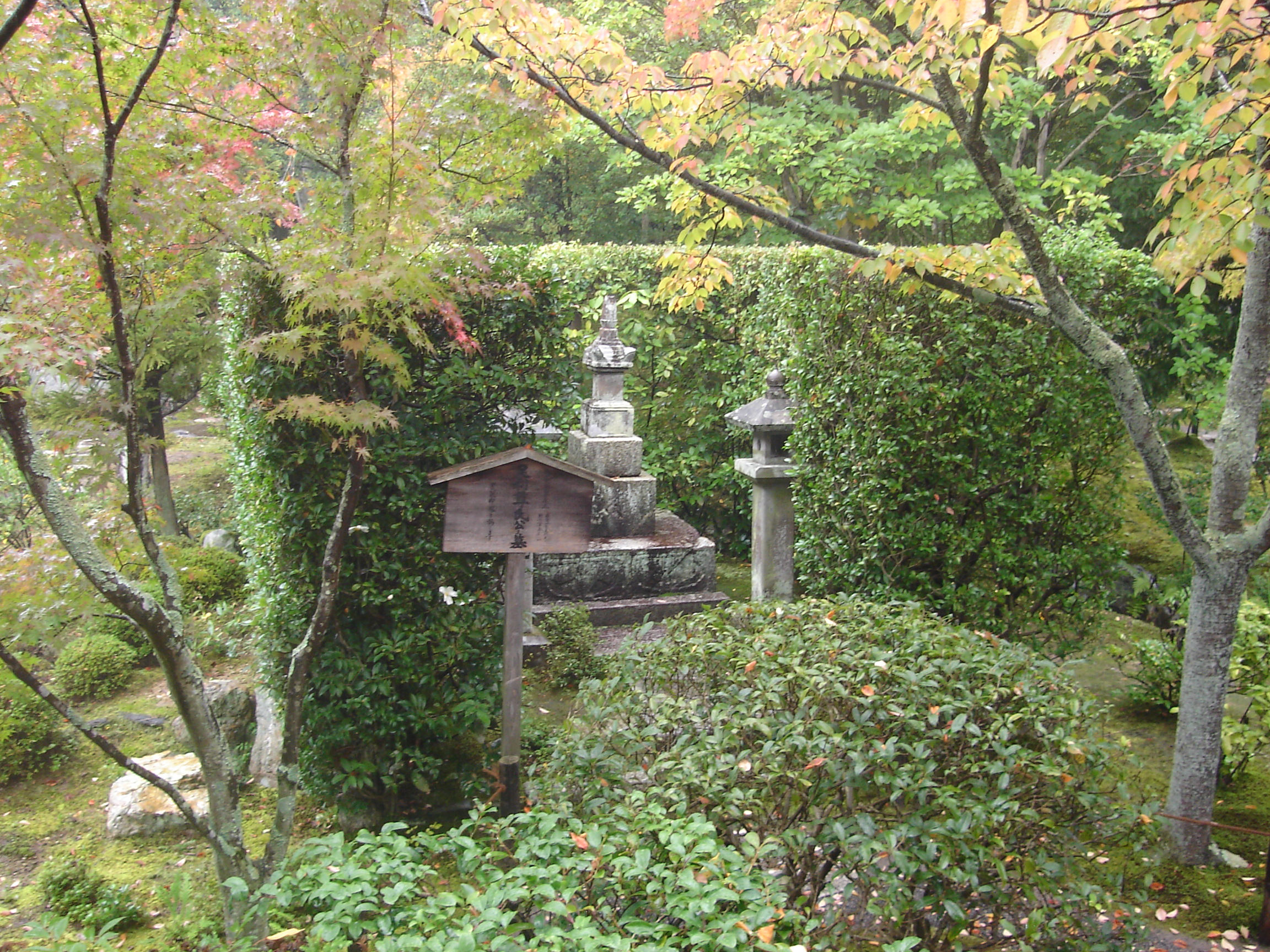
Tomb of Ashikaga Takauji at Tōji-in in Kyoto

Takauji defeated Yoshisada in the battles of Sanoyama and Mishima. This cleared the path for Takauji and Tadayoshi to march on to Kyoto. He captured Kyoto for a few days in February 1336, only to be driven out and fled to Kyūshū due to the arrival of forces under Prince Takanaga, Prince Norinaga, Kitabatake Akiie and Yūki Munehiro.

After Takauji and his brother were forced to retreat to the west, he then allied himself with the clans native to Kyūshū. After defeating the Kikuchi clan at Hakata Bay in the Battle of Tatarahama (1336), Takauji swayed many of Kikuchi's men to his side, giving Takauji control over Kyushu. His brother advanced simultaneously by land and both reached the environs of present-day Kobe in July.

At the decisive Battle of Minatogawa in 1336, Takauji defeated Yoshisada again and killed Masashige, allowing him to seize Kyoto for good. Emperor Kōmyō of the illegitimate Northern Court (see below) was installed as emperor by Takauji in opposition to the exiled Southern Court, beginning the turbulent Northern and Southern Court period (Nanbokuchō), which saw two emperors fight each other and which would last for almost 60 years.

Besides other honors, Emperor Go-Daigo had given Takauji the title of Chinjufu-shōgun, or Commander-in-chief of the Defense of the North, and the courtly title of the Fourth Rank, Junior Grade. His Buddhist name was Tojiinden Niyama Myogi dai koji Chojuji-dono (等持院殿仁山妙義大居士長寿寺殿).

== Family ==
Parents and siblings

- Father: Ashikaga Sadauji (足利 貞氏; 1273–1331)
- Mother: Uesugi Kiyoko (上杉 清子; 1270–1343)
- Siblings:
  - Half-siblings: Ashikaga Takayoshi (足利高義; 1297–1317)
  - Natural Siblings: Ashikaga Tadayoshi (足利 直義; 1307–1352)

Consorts and issue:

- Wife: Akahashi Toshi (赤橋 登子; 1306 – 4 May 1365)
  - Son: Ashikaga Yoshiakira (足利 義詮; July 4, 1330 – December 28, 1367)
  - Son: Ashikaga Motouji (足利基氏) (1340–1367)
  - Daughter: Tazuō (鶴王; d.1353)
- Concubine: Kako no Tsubone
  - Son: Ashikaga Takewakamaru (足利 竹若丸; d. 1333)
- Concubine: Echizen no Tsubone (越前局)
  - Illegitimate son: Ashikaga Tadafuyu (足利 直冬; 1327–1387, Ashikaga Tadayoshi's adopted son)
- Concubine Unknown name
  - Daughter: Unknown name (d. 2 October 1342)
  - Son: Seiōmaru (聖王丸; d. 1 August 1345)
  - Daughter: Ashikaga Tadayoshi's adopted daughter (d.14 October 1347)
  - Daughter: Unknown name
  - Son: Eichu Hoshin (英仲法俊; d. 26 February 1416)

== Family tree ==
Emperor Seiwa
"Hachimantarō" Yoshiie
Minamoto no Yoshichika	Minamoto no Yoshikuni
Nitta clan	Ashikaga clan
Minamoto no Tameyoshi	Nitta Yoshishige	Ashikaga Yoshiyasu
Yamana clan
Minamoto no Yoshitomo	Nitta Yoshikane	Yamana Yoshinori	Ashikaga Yoshikane	Minamoto no Yoshikiyo
Minamoto no Yoritomo	Ashikaga Yoshiuji	Hirosawa Yoshizane
Kira clan	Hosokawa clan
Ashikaga Yasuuji	Kira Osauji	Hosokawa Yoshisue
Uesugi clan	Imagawa clan
Uesugi Shigefusa	Ashikaga Yoriuji	Kira Mitsuuji	Imagawa Kuniuji
Uesugi Yorishige	Ashikaga Ietoki
Uesugi Kiyoko	Ashikaga Sadauji	Hojō Hisatoki
Nitta Yoshisada	Ashikaga Takauji	Akahashi Tōshi	Hōjō Moritoki
Ashikaga Yoshiakira

== Timeline of shogunate ==
Significant events which shaped the period during which Takauji was shōgun are:

- 1338 – Takauji appointed shōgun.
- 1349 – Go-Murakami flees to A'no; Ashikaga Tadayoshi and Kō no Moronao quarrel; Ashikaga Motouji, son of Takauji, appointed Kamakura Kanrei
- 1350 – Tadayoshi, excluded from administration, turns priest; Tadayoshi's adopted son, Ashikaga Tadafuyu is wrongly repudiated as a rebel.
- 1351–1358 – Struggle for Kyoto.
- 1351 – Tadayoshi joins Southern Court, southern army takes Kyoto; truce, Takauji returns to Kyoto; Tadayoshi and Takauji reconciled; Kō no Moronao and Kō no Moroyasu are exiled.
- 1352 – Tadayoshi dies, Southern army recaptures Kyoto; Nitta Yoshimune captures Kamakura; Ashikaga forces recapture Kamakura and Kyoto; Tadafuyu joins Southern Court; Yamana Tokiuji joins Tadafuyu.
- 1353 – Kyoto retaken by Southern forces under Yamana Tokiuji; retaken by Ashikaga forces.
- 1354 – Takauji flees with Go-Kōgon; Kitabatake Chikafusa dies.
- 1355 – Kyoto taken by Southern army; Kyoto retaken by Ashikaga forces.
- 1358 – Takauji dies.

Takauji's son Ashikaga Yoshiakira succeeded him as shōgun after his death. His grandson Ashikaga Yoshimitsu united the Northern and Southern courts in 1392.

== Eras of Takauji's bakufu ==
Because of the anomalous situation, which he had himself created and which saw two Emperors reign simultaneously, one in Yoshino and one in Kyoto, the years in which Takauji was shōgun as reckoned by the Gregorian calendar are identified in Japanese historical records by two different series of Japanese era names (nengō), that following the datation used by the legitimate Southern Court and that formulated by the pretender Northern Court.

Eras as reckoned by the Southern Court (declared legitimate by a Meiji era decree because in possession at the time of the Japanese Imperial Regalia):

- Engen (1336–1340)
- Kōkoku (1340–1346)
- Shōhei (1346–1370)

Eras as reckoned by the pretender Northern Court (declared illegitimate by a Meiji era decree because not in possession at the time of the Japanese Imperial Regalia):

- Ryakuō (1338–1342)
- Kōei (1342–1345)
- Jōwa (1345–1350)
- Kan'ō or Kannō (1350–1352)
- Bunna (1352–1356)
- Enbun (1356–1361)

== Literary references ==
The story of Ashikaga Takauji, Emperor Go-Daigo, Nitta Yoshisada, and Kusunoki Masashige from the Genko rebellion to the establishment of the Northern and Southern Courts is detailed in the 40 volume Muromachi period epic Taiheiki.

== Honours ==
- Junior First Rank (9 July 1358; posthumous)

== In popular culture ==
- The 29th NHK Taiga drama "Taiheiki" depicted the life of Takauji.
- He features in the manga The Elusive Samurai as the primary antagonist.

== Sources ==
- Ackroyd, Joyce I. (1982) Lessons from History: the Tokushi Yoron. Brisbane: University of Queensland Press. ISBN 9780702214851; OCLC 7574544
- Matsuo, Kenji. (1997). 中世都市鎌倉をく: 源頼朝から上杉謙信まで (Chūsei toshi Kamakura o aruku: Minamoto no Yoritomo kara Uesugi Kenshin made). Tokyo: Chūkō Shinsho. ISBN 9784121013927; OCLC 38970710
- Titsingh, Isaac. (1834). Nihon Ōdai Ichiran; ou, Annales des empereurs du Japon. Paris: Royal Asiatic Society, Oriental Translation Fund of Great Britain and Ireland. OCLC 585069

Kenmu Restoration	Shōgun: Ashikaga Takauji; 1338–1358	Succeeded by Ashikaga Yoshiakira
