= Kō no Moronao =

Japanese samurai (died 1351)

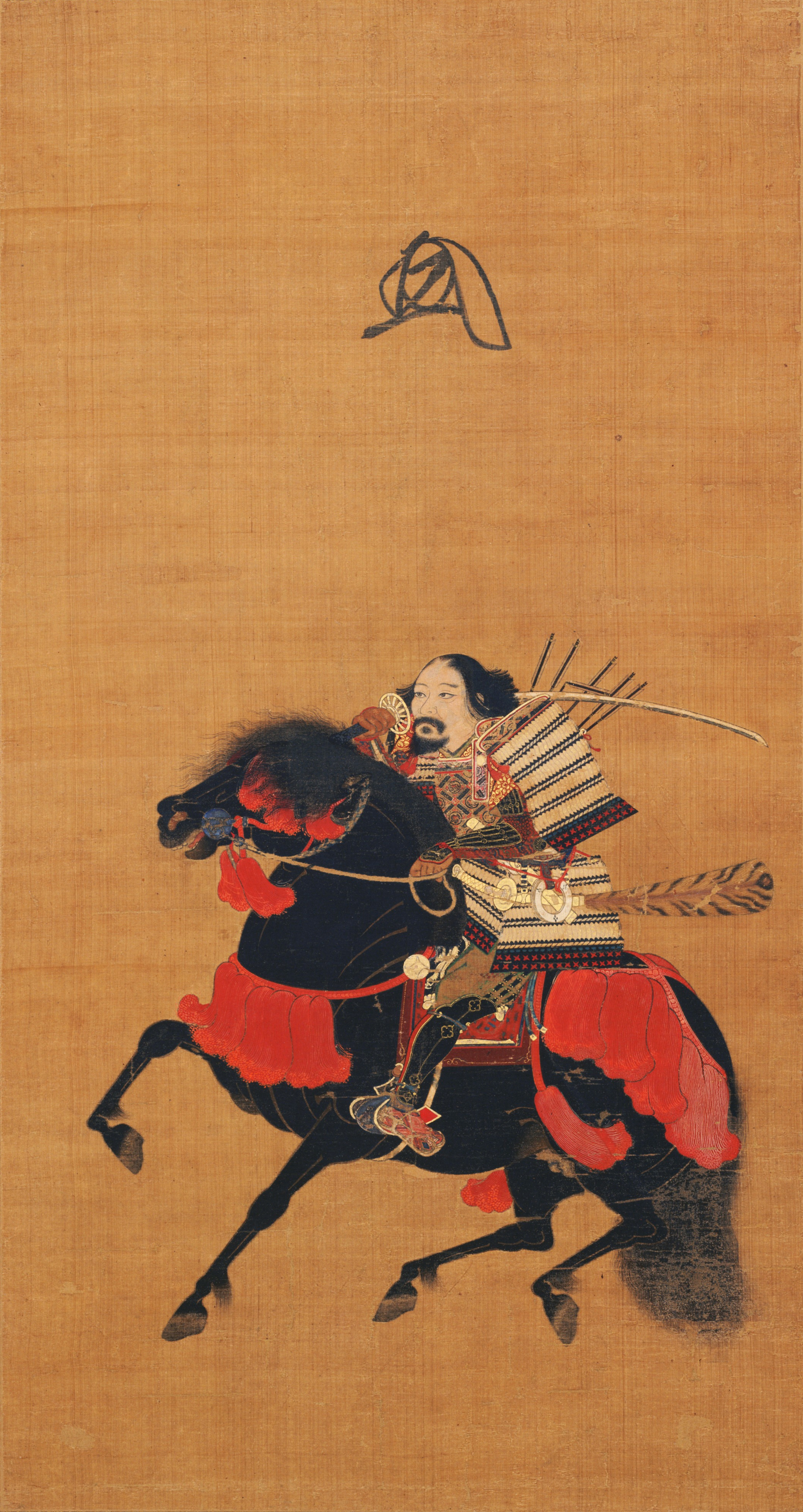
- Died: 24 March 1351
- Children: Kō no Morofuyu (adopted)
- Relatives: Kō no Moroyasu
- Military career
- Era: Late Kamakura – Nanboku-chō/early Muromachi

Kō no Moronao (高 師直; died 24 March 1351, also Moronō) was a Japanese samurai of the Nanboku-chō period who was the first to hold the position of Shitsuji (Shōgun's Deputy). He was appointed by Ashikaga Takauji, the first shōgun of the Ashikaga shogunate. As Deputy, he served not only an administrative governmental function, but also as general of the Shogun's armies. He fought for the Ashikaga against the loyalist forces of the Southern Court during the wars of the Nanboku-chō period and killed its generals Kitabatake Akiie and Kusunoki Masayuki.

Moronao was an iconoclast with no intention of following tradition, particularly insofar as the Emperor was concerned. On the subject, he once said:

What is the use of a King? Why should he live in a Palace? And why should we bow to him? If for some reason a King is needed, let us have one made of wood or metal, and let all the live Kings be banished.

The Taiheiki, an epic dedicated to the events of this period, describes the Kō brothers as avid villains. Moronao in particular is accused of violence, greed and lewdness. Because of this reputation, in the bunraku and kabuki play Kanadehon Chūshingura, which depicts the vendetta of the 47 rōnin, his name is used to represent Kira Yoshinaka.

Both Moronao and his brother Moroyasu during their careers were extremely useful to Takauji, but because of their violent and imperious characters they also made him many powerful enemies. Most importantly, Moronao was bitterly opposed to Takauji's younger brother Tadayoshi and his policies. This enmity would be the main trigger of the Kannō Disturbance, an extremely divisive and damaging civil war between Takauji and Tadayoshi with very serious repercussions for the whole country.

Although he ultimately won, Takauji was initially defeated in March 1351 by Tadayoshi and a truce was agreed upon with the help of Zen master Musō Soseki, who was close to both sides. One of the conditions imposed by Tadayoshi was that the Kō brothers would retire from politics forever and become monks, which they did. Moronao became a Zen monk and Moroyasu a member of the Nenbutsu fraternity. They later left Hyōgo for Kyoto accompanied by Takauji, but they would never arrive. The Kō were captured and then executed with many dozens of their family at the Mukogawa River by forces led by Uesugi Akiyoshi on 25 March 1351 (Kannō 2, 27th day of the 2nd month) in revenge for their killing of Akiyoshi's father Shigeyoshi. Takauji, powerless, had to deliver them to Akiyoshi.
