= List of The Elusive Samurai characters =

The Japanese manga series The Elusive Samurai features an extensive cast of characters created by Yusei Matsui. Many among them are based on historical Japanese figures from the early 14th century.

== Main characters ==
Hōjō Tokiyuki (北条 時行)
Voiced by: Asaki Yuikawa (Japanese); Abby Trott (English)
The heir to the Hōjō regency before its destruction by Ashikaga Takauji. After the fall of the shogunate, he took refuge under Yorishige, where he was taught martial arts and academics while plotting to overthrow the Ashikaga clan and restore the Hōjō clan. He has the superhuman ability to flee, hide, and dodge enemy attacks. To prevent being recognized by Takauji and his allies, he takes on the pseudonym of Koizumi Chōjumaru (小泉 長寿丸) in public.
Suwa Yorishige (諏訪 頼重)
Voiced by: Yuichi Nakamura (Japanese); Ricco Fajardo (English)
A shady priest from Suwa who claims can see the future. He is a loyal follower of the Hōjō clan and predicts that Tokiyuki would become a hero. It is revealed that he has the spirit of Suwa Myōjin inside him which makes him a god. Yorishige dies during Ashikaga's campaign to reclaim Kamakura just after it was conquered by Tokiyuki and his army.

=== The Elusive Warriors ===
Shizuku (雫)
Voiced by: Hinaki Yano (Japanese); Courtney Chu (English)
Yorishige's adopted daughter and assistant who has the ability to see spirits as a shrine maiden and acts as the logistics expert. It is revealed that she is a mishaguji, a mass of divine power capable of creating miracles which can disappear if she overuses her power. She later exhausts all her divine power but manages to retain her human form, becoming a normal person out of her desire to remain by Tokiyuki's side and one of his three wives.
Nezu Kojirō (袮津 弧次郎)
Voiced by: Mari Hino (Japanese); Jeannie Tirado (English)
A young swordsman who is skilled for his age and becomes Tokiyuki's military commander.
Mochizuki Ayako (望月 亜也子)
Voiced by: Sayumi Suzushiro (Japanese); Brittany Cox (English)
A young swordswoman with superstrength and artistic talent. She later grows feelings for Tokiyuki and becomes one of his three wives.
Kazama Genba (風間 玄蕃)
Voiced by: Aoi Yūki (Japanese); Kaitlyn Robrock (English)
A thief who operates on money and fear and is able to impersonate anyone using his fox mask. He joins the Elusive Warriors and becomes the leader of Tokyuki's spies.
Fubuki (吹雪)
Voiced by: Kikunosuke Toya (Japanese); Stuart Allan (English)
A rōnin who dual wields swords and joins the group after seeing Tokiyuki as a master worth serving under. Later on the story, he defects to Takauji's faction and is adopted by Kō no Moronao who renames him Kō no Morofuyu (高 師冬). He apparently is killed in a duel with Tokiyuki, but is later revived thanks to Uesugi's experiments and returns to the Elusive Warriors.
Natsu-no-yon (夏の四)
Voiced by: Yūko Sanpei (Japanese); Stephen Fu (English) (Tengu)
Natsu is an elite member of shinobi who disguise themselves as tengu, originally loyal to Kō no Moronao, before becoming Genba's aide and later, his wife, also learning how to value her life.
Shina (粃, Shiina)
Shina is a powerful Hōjō samurai, who was crippled during the Ashikaga rebellion, but upon entering Tokiyuki's servitude, she gains weapons tailor-made to allow her to fight.
Sasaki Mima (佐々木 魅摩)
Voiced by: Niina Hanamiya (Japanese); Michaela Jill Murphy (English)
Mima is Dōyo's young daughter who likes to gamble, and has great divine power, growing close to Tokiyuki and later becoming one of his three wives.

== Tokiyuki's allies ==
=== Suwa Sect ===
Suwa Moritaka (諏訪 盛高)
Voiced by: Fumitake Ishiguro (Japanese); Mark Whitten (English)
A relative and ally of Yorishige.
Suwa Tokitsugu (諏訪 時継)
Voiced by: Fumitake Ishiguro
Yorishige's son, who is a calm and reserved person, unlike his father.
Sakae (栄)
Voiced by: Wakana Kuramochi
Sakae is a Suwa shrine maiden close to Yukiyasu, whose ear is shot off by Ogasawara.
Hikari (光)
Voiced by: Juri Nagatsuma
Hikari is a Suwa shrine maiden close to Yukiyasu.
Homare (誉)
Voiced by: Marie Miyake
Homare is a Suwa shrine maiden close to Yukiyasu.
Hoshina Yasaburō (保科 弥三郎)
Voiced by: Tetsu Inada (Japanese); Kyle Omori (English)
A hot-headed warrior and member of the Hoshina clan who is part of the Suwa sect found in the territory of the kokushi.
Shinomiya Saemontarō (四宮 左衛門太郎)
Voiced by: Shin'ichirō Kamio (Japanese); Wolfie Trausch (English)
A warrior and an ally of Hoshina who is part of the Suwa sect.
Yūki Sanjūrō (結城 三十郎)
Voiced by: Soungdok
Sanjūrō is a savage warrior serving Hoshina, and the son of general Yūki Munehiro, who serves the Emperor.
Unno Yukiyasu (海野 幸康)}
Voiced by: Taiten Kusunoki (Japanese); Cory Yee (English)
Yukiyasu is a powerful warrior who is shy with women, and one of the Three Great Generals of the Suwa army.
Mochizuki Shigenobu (望月 重信)
Voiced by: Kenta Miyake (Japanese); Sean Burgos (English)
Shigenobu is a powerful warrior and one of the Three Great Generals of the Suwa army, as well as Ayako's father.
Nezu Yorinao (袮津 頼直)
Voiced by: Katsuyuki Miura (Japanese); Xander Mobus (English)
Yorinao is Kojiro's strict uncle, who raised him, as well as one of the Three Great Generals of the Suwa army.
Nezu Kojirō (袮津 小次郎)
Voiced by: Mari Hino
Yorinao's son who shares his name with his cousin, though they're written differently. Yorinao gave his name to his cousin, so that the latter's valor could raise both their names.
Suwa Yoritsugu (諏訪 頼継)
Voiced by: Yumiko Takahashi (Japanese); Katie Leigh (English)
Yoritsugu is Yorishige's 7-year-old grandson, who is jealous of the affection Tokiyuki receives from his grandfather.
Kosaka Takamune (香坂 高宗)
Takamune is a young warrior member of the Suwa Sect, who Tokiyuki reunites with after the Nakasendai war.

=== Other allies ===
Inukai Tomomitsu (犬甘 知光)
Voiced by: Takashi Uezumiya
Tomomitsu is a samurai serving the Fukashi Magistrate, who is Yorishige's ally.
Tokoiwa Muneie (常岩 宗家)
Voiced by: Hiroki Matsukawa
Tokoiwa is a samurai serving the Kitajo Magistrate, who is Yorishige's ally.
Miura Hachirō (三浦 八郎)
Voiced by: Setsuo Itō
Hachirō is a young and loyal member of the Miura clan, vassal of the Hōjō clan.
Miura Tokiaki (三浦 時明)
Tokiaki is the leader of the Miura clan, who initially betrayed the Hōjō clan during the Ashikaga rebellion, before returning to Tokiyuki's servitude.
Nagoe Takakuni (名越 高邦)
A young warrior of the loyal Nagoe clan, whose father was slain by the Ashikaga when Kamakura burned.
Goro Masamune (五郎政宗)
Masamune is an unrivaled blacksmith who forges custom weapons for anyone he deems worthy, no matter the allegiance.
Nagasaki Surugashiro (長崎 駿河四郎)
Surugashiro is a warrior loyal to the Hōjō clan in Izu.

== Ashikaga Faction ==
Ashikaga Takauji (足利 高氏 / 足利 尊氏)
Voiced by: Katsuyuki Konishi, Miyuki Sakurai (young) (Japanese); Jonah Scott (English)
A former ally to the Hōjō clan who defected to the Emperor's side and overthrew the shogunate. Later he betrays the emperor and joins forces with the Northern Court, igniting a civil war with the intention of establishing a new shogunate with him as ruler.
Ashikaga Tadayoshi (足利 直義)
Voiced by: Makoto Furukawa, Kanako Nomura (young)
Takauji's younger brother and strategist.
Kō no Moronao (高 師直)
Voiced by: Atsushi Miyauchi
The cunning right-hand man and steward of Takauji, who later adopts Fubuki and brings him to his side.
Kō no Moroyasu (高 師泰)
Voiced by: Ryu Yamaguchi
Moroyasu is Moronao's little brother and a powerful warrior.
Ogasawara Sadamune (小笠原 貞宗)
Voiced by: Yutaka Aoyama (Japanese); Kellen Goff (English)
A retainer of Takauji and the governor of Shinano who is proficient in archery and is able to perceive every detail in his immediate surroundings. Despite being enemies with Tokiyuki, he later develops a friendly relationship with him.
Ichikawa Sukefusa (市河 助房)
Voiced by: Takahiro Yamamoto (Japanese); Keith Silverstein (English)
A retainer and ally of Sadamune who can spot his enemies through his sharp hearing senses.
Shōkan (瘴奸)
Voiced by: Hiroki Tōchi (Japanese); Fred Tatasciore (English)
The current alias of Hirano Shōgen (平野 将監) who is the leader of a group of bandits and becomes Sadamune's retainer.
Furan (腐乱)
Voiced by: Tōru Nara
Furan is a bandit with a tri-color tattoo on his face who serves Shōkan, and faces off against Fubuki.
Sasaki Dōyo (佐々木 道誉)
Voiced by: Kenji Yamauchi
Dōyo is one of Takauji's close advisors and a priest, who seems apathetic to the fate of people other than his daughter, Mima.
Nagao Kagetada (長尾 影只)
Kagetada is the former head of the fallen Nagao clan, who was brainwashed and experimented on by Uesugi Noriaki to become a powerful warrior.
Imagawa Yorikuni (今川 頼国)
Yorikuni is the brother of Norimitsu from the Hisashiban, who wears a bull mask in battle.
Ashikaga Yoshiakira (足利 義詮)
Yoshiakira is Takauji's 7-year old son and a lord who seeks to gain his father's favor.
Momonoi Tadatsune (桃井 直常)
Tadatsune is a skilled warrior serving Ienaga and Noriaki, who is enchanted by Ayako on the battlefield.
Ashikaga Tadafuyu (足利 直冬)
Tadafuyu is a bastard son of Takauji taken in by a priest, who has a chance encounter with Tokiyuki.
Toki Yorito (斎 従人)
Yorito is a gigantic warrior serving Moronao who faces off against Akiie's army.
Uesugi Shigeyoshi (上杉 重吉)
Shigeyoshi is Noriaki's older brother and head of the Uesugi family under Tadayoshi's rule.
Murakami Nobusada (村上 信禎)
The new general of the forces in the Shinano province after the Nakasendai war, with an especially keen sense of smell.
Aeba Myozurumaru (饗庭 命鶴丸)
Myozurumaru, also called as Myozuru by Takauji, is his favored ward and a talented warrior, who occasionally dances for Takauji as well.
Kō no Moroyo (高 モロヨ)
Moroyo is Moroyasu's son and a powerful warrior touted as a secret weapon to turn the tides of Takauji's war.

=== Kantō Hisashiban ===
Shiba Ienaga (斯波 家長)
Voiced by: Ayumu Murase (Japanese); Laura Post (English)
Ienaga, also known by his childhood name; Shiba Magojirō (斯波 孫二郎), is a genius strategist, said to rival Tadayoshi, who was chosen by him to be a yoriki of the Hisashiban, designated to protect Kamakura.
Uesugi Noriaki (上杉 憲顕)
Voiced by: Yasuyuki Kase (Japanese); Daman Mills (English)
Noriaki is a pale man obsessed with human experimentation and the vice-leader of the second detachment of the Hisashiban.
Shibukawa Yoshisue (渋川 義季)
Voiced by: Toshiki Masuda (Japanese); Jonathon Ha (English)
Yoshisue is the leader of the first detachment of the Hisashiban, as well as Tadayoshi's brother-in-law, who has anger issues and wields an ōdachi.
Iwamatsu Tsuneie (岩松 経家)
Voiced by: Yū Hayashi (Japanese); Ben Balmaceda (English)
Tsuneie is the leader of the second detachment of the Hisashiban, who is a womanizer.
Imagawa Norimitsu (今川 範満)
Norimitsu is a powerful yoriki, who is an extremely dangerous cavalry warrior, also wearing a horse mask in battle.
Isshiki Yoriyuki (一色 依幸)
Yoriyuki is the leader of the fourth detachment of the Hisashiban.
Kira Mitsuyoshi (吉良 満義)
Mitsuyoshi is the leader of the sixth detachment of the Hisashiban.
Ishidō Noriie (石塔 範家)
Voiced by: Taisuke Nakano
Noriie is the leader of the seventh detachment of the Hisashiban, who is obsessed with a goddess named Tsuruko, that he made up.

== Government ==
Emperor Go-Daigo (後醍醐天皇, Go-Daigo-tennō)
Voiced by: Fuminori Komatsu
The Emperor leading the restoration of Imperial rule after the overthrowing of the shogunate.
Prince Moriyoshi (護良 親王, Moriyoshi Shinnō)
Voiced by: Ryōta Suzuki (Japanese); Ryan Colt Levy (English)
The son of the Emperor who attempted to assassinate Takauji out of fear of Takauji ousting the Emperor.
Kusunoki Masashige (楠木 正成)
Voiced by: Kenichi Suzumura (Japanese); Mark Whitten (English)
A brilliant strategist and one of the main forces of the Emperor.
Kitabatake Chikafusa (北畠 親房)
Chikafusa is a court noble and one of the Emperor's closest advisors, as well as Akiie's father.
Nitta Yoshisada (新田 義貞)
Voiced by: Nobuyuki Hiyama
Nitta is a powerful military commander loyal to the Emperor, who participated in the defeat of the Kamakura shogunate in 1333.
Kusunoki Masatsura (楠木 正行)
Masatsura is Masashige's eldest son, who is inspired to action by tales of Tokiyuki's bravado.
Kusunoki Masatoki (楠木 正時)
Masatoki is Masashige's second son, who follows in his elder brother and Tokiyuki's footsteps.
Prince Munenaga (宗良 親王, Muneyoshi Shinnō)
Muneyoshi, later known as Munenaga, is emperor Go-Daigo's eighth son and representative of the Emperor on the battlefield.
Nitta Yoshimune (新田 義宗)
Yoshisada's third son and Yoshioki's younger brother, and later an ally of the Suwa.
Kiyohara Shinano-no-kami (清原 信濃守)
Voiced by: Anri Katsu (Japanese); Todd Haberkorn (English)
The eccentric kokushi of Shinano, the highest authority in the Shinano territory.
Wada Yonemaru (和田 米丸)
Voiced by: Kōji Takeda
A brutish warrior serving Kiyohara.

=== Akiie's Army ===
Kitabatake Akiie (北畠 顕家)
Akiie is a court noble and later general serving the Emperor, who is an extremely talented bowman, who united the Northern "savages" under his army.
Kasuga Akikuni (春日 顕国)
Akikuni is Akiie's right-hand man and a skilled strategist.
Nitta Yoshioki (新田 義興)
Yoshisada's son, Nitta Tokujumaru (新田 得十丸), later re-christened by the Emperor as Yoshioki for his valor in battle, is a 7-year old warrior serving Akiie, who befriends Tokiyuki.
Yūki Munehiro (結城 宗広)
Munehiro is one of Akiie's generals and a savage warrior, like his son.
Date Yukitomo (伊達 行朝)
Yukitomo is one of Akiie's generals from up north, who was considered barbaric by the court.
Nanbu Moroyuki (南部 師行)
Moroyuki is one of Akiie's generals from up north, whose strong dialect makes it nigh impossible for others to understand him, which is why he has an interpreter.
Moroyuki's interpreter
Moroyuki's interpreter is a young woman who speaks the Northern dialect and translates Moroyuki's words.
Horiguchi Sadamitsu (堀口 貞光)
Sadamitsu is one of Yoshioki's retainers and closest allies.
Hata Tokiyoshi (畑 時能)
Tokiyoshi is one of Yoshioki's retainers and closest allies.
Utsunomiya Kintsuna (宇都宮 公綱)
Kintsuna is a stern older general one of Akiie's closest allies.

== Hōjō Clan ==
Hōjō Kunitoki (北条 邦時)
Voiced by: Yuka Terasaki
Tokiyuki's older half-brother, who held no interest in inheriting the regency in order to prevent a dispute over the succession. He was executed after his own uncle betrayed him.
Hōjō Takatoki (北条 高時)
Voiced by: Hinata Tadokoro
Tokiyuki's father and head of the Kamakura Shogunate, who is actually an inept puppet ruler controlled by nobles.
Godaiin Muneshige (五大院 宗繁)
Voiced by: Atsushi Imaruoka
A relative to the Hōjō clan and the maternal uncle of Tokiyuki and Kunitoki, who sold out Kunitoki to a search party for personal glory.
Hōjō Yasuie (新田 泰家)
Voiced by: Yōji Ueda (Japanese); Sean Chiplock (English)
Yasuie is Tokiyuki's paternal uncle and one of the last surviving members of the Kamakura Shogunate.
Kakunai-ni (覚海尼)
Kakunai-ni is Tokiyuki's paternal grandmother who lives in Izu, the clan's ancestral home.
