= Asaki Yuikawa =

Japanese voice actress and singer

- 結川 あさき
- Born: 15 February
- Occupations: Voice actress; singer
- Years active: 2022–present
- Employer: I'm Enterprise
- Notable work: The Elusive Samurai as Hōjō Tokiyuki; Tonari no Yōkai-san as Mutsumi Sugimoto; Trapezium as Yū Azuma; BanG Dream! as Nagi Kotohira

Asaki Yuikawa (結川 あさき, Yuikawa Asaki; born 15 February) is a Japanese voice actress and singer from Tokyo, affiliated with I'm Enterprise. She is known for starring as Hōjō Tokiyuki, the main protagonist of the anime television series The Elusive Samurai, as well as Mutsumi Sugimoto in Tonari no Yōkai-san and Yū Azuma in Trapezium.

== Early life and career ==
Yuikawa, a native of Tokyo, was born on 15 February and educated at the Japan Narration Actor Institute. She joined I'm Enterprise on 1 April 2022.

In March 2023, she was cast as Hōjō Tokiyuki, the main protagonist of the anime television series The Elusive Samurai. At the time, she was a newcomer to the agency and did not even have her own image on their website, and she was unaware of her new role until she learned about it in a voice actors' interview project. In August 2023, she appeared at Aniplex Online Fest.

In November 2023, it was announced she would star as Mutsumi Sugimoto in Tonari no Yōkai-san. She later starred in her first cinematic leading role as Yū Azuma in the 2024 film adaptation of Trapezium, and she and the rest of the cast performed the ending theme "Hōi Jishin". Author Kazumi Takayama intuitively noticed Yuikawa from the moment she entered the audition studio, and when she spoke her lines, she was convinced that "Azuma is Yuikawa-san", later recalling that every staff member present had the same belief.

Her hobbies are music and games, and her special skill is futsal. She has a Grade 2 certificate in Kanji Kentei.

== Filmography ==
=== Television animation ===
Year	Title	Role	Ref.
2022	Idolish7 Third Beat!		
2023	Good Night World	Natsuki	
2023	Oshi no Ko		
2023	Shangri-La Frontier	Rumi Hizutome	
2023	The Eminence in Shadow		
2023	The Legendary Hero Is Dead!	Shannon Petrarca	
2024	A Condition Called Love	Marika	
2024	Atri: My Dear Moments	Miyo	
2024	Cardfight!! Vanguard Divinez		
2024	Jellyfish Can't Swim in the Night	Mayumi	
2024	Studio Apartment, Good Lighting, Angel Included		
2024	The Elusive Samurai	Hōjō Tokiyuki	
2024	The Magical Girl and the Evil Lieutenant Used to Be Archenemies		
2024	Tonari no Yōkai-san	Mutsumi Sugimoto	
2024	Why Does Nobody Remember Me in This World?		
2024	Wind Breaker	Mio Tsuchiya	
2024	Yatagarasu		
2024	Blue Box	Niina Shimazaki	
2025	Cultural Exchange with a Game Centre Girl	Karin Kaga	
2026	Marriagetoxin	Shiori Ureshino	
2026	Eren the Southpaw	Yūko Akane	
2026	Magical Girl Lyrical Nanoha Exceeds Gun Blaze Vengeance	Towa Yorumi	
2026	Magical Explorer	Iori Hijiri	

=== Animated film ===
Year	Title	Role	Ref.
2024	Trapezium	Yū Azuma	

=== Original net animation ===
Year	Title	Role	Ref.
2024	Monsters: 103 Mercies Dragon Damnation		

=== Video games ===
Year	Title	Role	Ref.
2022	Brown Dust	Vestria	
2024	Reynatis	Hitomi Meguro	
2024	Kantai Collection	Heian Maru, Drum	
2026	BanG Dream! Our Notes	Nagi Kotohira	
2026	Maimai DX Magical	Kanadera	
