= Atsushi Imaruoka =

Japanese voice actor

- 伊丸岡 篤
- Born: May 23, 1972 (age 54); Isesaki, Gunma Prefecture, Japan
- Occupation: Voice actor
- Years active: 2001–present
- Agent: Mausu Promotion

Atsushi Imaruoka (伊丸岡 篤, Imaruoka Atsushi; born May 23, 1972) is a Japanese voice actor. He is affiliated with Mausu Promotion.

== Filmography ==
=== Anime ===
2001

- Okojo-san (Hasegawa)

2003

- The Galaxy Railways (José Antonio Valdivia, Ōiwa)

2004

- Gokusen (Ohashi)
- Desert Punk (Haro Ōnami)

2005

- Elemental Gelade (Jimothy Cubege)
- Hell Girl (Hideo Yasuda, Goro Suetsugu)
- Basilisk (Jimushi Jubei)

2006

- 009-1 (Apollo)
- Welcome to the N.H.K. (Hideo Nomura)
- Hell Girl: Two Mirrors (Heitaro Kenmochi, Shigeki Ozaki, Tanidenki, Sakuma)
- Ghost Hunt (Eijiro Yoshimi)
- Shōnen Onmyōji (Enki)
- A Spirit of the Sun (Terada)
- Tokyo Tribes (Batter Nori, Sasaki)
- Tokimeki Memorial Only Love (Fumihiko Kinosaki, Hiromi Akaboshi)
- Strain: Strategic Armored Infantry (Hobbs)
- Wan Wan Celeb Soreyuke! Tetsunoshin (John)

2007

- Big Windup! (Keisuke Yamanoi)
- Kono Aozora ni Yakusoku o (Masashi Fujimura)
- Skull Man (Jin Mamiya)
- Fantastic Detective Labyrinth (Gonji Suzuki)
- Toward the Terra (Helman, Romero)
- My Bride Is a Mermaid (Burio, Nagasumi's father)
- Baccano! (Dallas Geonard)
- Bamboo Blade (Akira Toyama)

2008

- S · A: Special A (Jiro Hanazono)
- Golgo 13 (Scott)
- Hell Girl: Three Vessels (Kengo Saegusa)
- Natsume's Book of Friends (Akagane)
- Nabari no Ou (Akatsuki Rokujō)
- Naruto: Shippuden (Fudo)

2009

- The Beast Player Erin (Karon)
- Sengoku Basara: Samurai Kings (Naoe Kanetsugu)
- Mazinger Edition Z: The Impact! (Detective Ankokuji)

2010

- Big Windup! Season 2 (Keisuke Yamanoi)
- Princess Jellyfish (Tsukimi's father)
- The Qwaser of Stigmata (Jackal)
- Sengoku Basara: Samurai Kings 2 (Naoe Kanetsugu)
- Durarara!! (Ran Izumii)
- The Legend of the Legendary Heroes (Claugh Klom)
- Fairy Tail (Cobra)

2011

- Kamisama Dolls (Murota)
- Maken-ki! (Gen Tagayashi)

2012

- Girls und Panzer (Shinzaburō)
- JoJo's Bizarre Adventure (Rudol von Stroheim)

2013

- Samurai Flamenco (Guillotine Gorilla)
- Tanken Driland (Jarudo)
- Haiyore! Nyaruko-san W (Zhar)
- Log Horizon (Demiquas)

2014

- Shōnen Hollywood (Kamiji)
- Jinsei (Fake Yoshitaka)
- Marvel Disk Wars: The Avengers (Joel Murphy, MODOK)
- Tenkai Knights (Slyger)
- Hamatora: The Animation (Haruo Edogawa)
- Maken-ki! Two (Gen Tagayashi)
- Encouragement of Climb: Second Season (Susuki)
- Log Horizon 2 (Demiquas)

2015

- Assassination Classroom (Smog)
- Kindaichi Case Files R Season 2 (Nemoto)
- Kuroko's Basketball 3 (Hideki Ishida)
- Subete ga F ni Naru (Satoshi Hasebe)
- Durarara!!x2 (Ran Izumii)
- Rampo Kitan: Game of Laplace (Sunaga)
- Lupin the Third Part 4 (Romeo)
- One-Punch Man (Tank-Top Blackhole)

2016

- 91 Days (Mad Mack)
- Durarara!!x2 Ketsu (Ran Izumii)
- Haruchika: Haruta & Chika (Matsuda)

2017

- Kirakira PreCure a la Mode (Hotto, Bitard, Spongen)
- One Piece (Charlotte Mont-d'Or)
- Knight's & Magic (David Hepken)

2019

- Afterlost (Jack)

2021

- That Time I Got Reincarnated as a Slime (Middray)

2022

- Tokyo 24th Ward (Yamamori)
- Salaryman's Club (Kohji Matsushita)
- Shinobi no Ittoki (Gantetsu Suzunone)

2023

- Edens Zero Season 2 (Daichi)
- Reign of the Seven Spellblades (Cyrus Rivermoore)

2024

- The Elusive Samurai (Godaiin Muneshige}
- Loner Life in Another World (Ofter)

=== Original video animation ===
- Bludgeoning Angel Dokuro-Chan (Umezawa)
- Carnival Phantasm (Kunifuji, Sasaki Battōsai)
- Ichi the Killer: Episode 0 (Nobuo)
- Kirameki Project (Kikuchi, Schmidt)
- Maria Watches Over Us Season 3 (Gensuke Sawamura)
- Saint Seiya: The Lost Canvas (Worm Raimi)
- ShootFighter Tekken (Mikunino)
- Transformers: Go! (Judōra)

=== Original web animation ===
- Ninja Slayer From Animation (Yamahiro)
- Wonder Momo (Glooder)
- Fate/Grand Order: You've Lost Ritsuka Fujimaru (Goredolf Musik)

=== Tokusatsu ===
2008

- Engine Sentai Go-onger (Savage Sky Barbaric Machine Beast Heater Banki (ep. 34))

2010

- Tensou Sentai Goseiger (Yuumajuu Elmgaim of the Baku (ep. 30))

2011

- Kamen Rider OOO (UniArmadillo Yummy (ep. 37))

2014

- Ressha Sentai ToQger (Bomb Shadow (ep. 8))

2015

- Shuriken Sentai Ninninger (Westein Yokai Dracula (ep. 24 - 25))

2016

- Kamen Rider Ghost (Hikoki Ganma Brothers (ep. 26 (Elder), 25 - 26 (Younger)), Hikoki Ganma Perfect (ep. 36))

=== Video games ===
- Fu-un Bakumatsu-den (Sōma Tonomo)
- Izuna: Legend of the Unemployed Ninja (Utsuho)
- JoJo's Bizarre Adventure: All Star Battle (Rudol von Stroheim)
- JoJo's Bizarre Adventure: Eyes of Heaven (Rudol von Stroheim)
- Kobayashi ga Kawai Sugite Tsurai!! (Kagetsuna Sanada)
- Overwatch (Winston)
- Princess Maker 5 (Hitoshi Kuroda)
- Sengoku Basara 2 (Naoe Kanetsugu)
- Sengoku Basara 4 (Naoe Kanetsugu)
- Sengoku Basara: Samurai Heroes (Naoe Kanetsugu)
- Super Street Fighter IV (Adon)
- Ultra Street Fighter IV (Adon)
- Way of the Samurai 2 (Gunji Dojima)
- Way of the Samurai 3 (Gunji Dojima, Dr. Genan)
- Way of the Samurai 4 (Gunji Dojima)
- Sdorica (Dylan Levon, Dylan SP, Karnulla)
- Fire Emblem: Three Houses (Jeritza, Death Knight)

=== Dubbing ===
==== Live-action ====
- 10,000 BC (Moha)
- 24 (Rick Burke, Kevin Wade)
- 300: Rise of an Empire (General Bandari (Ashraf Barhom))
- Adventureland (Joel (Martin Starr))
- Alien Siege (Leon)
- The Baytown Outlaws (McQueen Oodie)
- The Black Phone (Max (James Ransone))
- The Bourne Ultimatum (Paz)
- Casa de los Babys (Don Mercurio)
- Casa de Mi Padre (Raúl Álvarez)
- Coach Carter (Oscar)
- The Da Vinci Code (Youth on Bus (Shane Zaza))
- The Dark Knight (Lau, Bank Manager)
- Fat Albert (Bill Cosby Jr. (Keith Robinson))
- Ghost Whisperer (Julian Borgia)
- Guardians of the Galaxy Vol. 2 (Howard the Duck)
- Hawaii Five-0 (Ray Mapes)
- Hotel Rwanda (Dube)
- I'll Always Know What You Did Last Summer (Roger Pack)
- The Interpreter (Doug)
- King Kong (Jimmy)
- Lost (Caesar)
- Million Dollar Baby (Omar)
- Minority Report (Lt. Will Blake)
- Pee Mak (Puak)
- Power Rangers Mystic Force (Imperious)
- Power Rangers Samurai (Antonio Garcia)
- Project Runway (Collier Strong)
- The Road to Guantánamo (Shafiq Rasul)
- Rush (Anthony 'Bubbles' Horsley (Julian Rhind-Tutt))
- The Seeker (James Stanton)
- Sesame Street (Count von Count)
- Superman Returns (Stanford (Kal Penn))
- Terminator Genisys (Danny Dyson)
- Ultimate Force (Corporal Ricky Mann)

==== Animation ====
- Arthur and the Revenge of Maltazard (Max)
- Dead End: Paranormal Park (Pugsley)
- Gravity Falls (Soos)
- Rio (Luiz)
- Rio 2 (Luiz)
- Secret Level (Rade)
- Transformers: Animated (Cliffjumper, Highbrow, Ironhide (Japanese:Armor Hide), Warpath, Oil-Slick)
- Transformers: Prime (Breakdown)(Japanese:War Breakdown)
- Gameoverse (Kaboodle)
