= My Neighbor Yokai =

Japanese manga series

- Cover of Tonari no Yōkai-san volume 1 by East Press

となりの妖怪さん (Tonari no Yōkai-san)
- Genre: Fantasy
- Manga
- Written by: noho
- Published by: East Press
- English publisher: NA: Ink Pop
- Magazine: Matogrosso
- Original run: July 2018 – January 6, 2022
- Volumes: 4 + 2 side stories
- Anime television series

Tonari no Yōkai-san
- Directed by: Aimi Yamauchi
- Written by: Tomoko Konparu
- Music by: ats-; Takehito Shimizu; Toru Watanabe
- Studio: Liden Films
- Licensed by: Crunchyroll
- Original network: ANN (ABC TV, TV Asahi), AT-X, BS12 TwellV
- Original run: April 7, 2024 – June 30, 2024
- Episodes: 13
- icon

My Neighbor Yokai (Japanese: となりの妖怪さん, Hepburn: Tonari no Yōkai-san; lit. "The Yōkai Next to Me") is a Japanese manga series by noho. It originally began serialization online via Twitter in August 2017. It was then serialized via East Press' Matogrosso website from July 2018 to January 2022 and was collected in four tankōbon volumes and two side story volumes. The manga is licensed in English by Ink Pop of Penguin Random House. An anime television series adaptation produced by Liden Films aired from April to June 2024.

== Synopsis ==
Set in a version of Earth where yōkai, humans and gods live together, the story follows the lives of several characters in Fuchigamori, a rural Japanese village. A twenty-year-old cat named Buchio evolves into a Nekomata and sets out to learn more from his yōkai peers about his evolution. Meanwhile, a young human named Mutsumi becomes curious about their neighbor Jiro, a crow Tengu who performs ritual Shinto duties.

== Characters ==
Mutsumi Sugimoto (杉本 睦実, Sugimoto Mutsumi) / Mu-chan (むーちゃん, Mū-chan)
Voiced by: Asaki Yuikawa
A human third-grader in training to become a miko. She is troubled by the disappearance of her father, causing her to feel lonely and listless. She loves Jiro, but struggles to express her feelings.
Jirōbō Fuchibiyama (縁火山 次郎坊, Fuchibiyama Jirōbō) / Jirō (ジロー)
Voiced by: Ryosuke Higa
A crow tengu who has served as guardian of Fuchigamori for centuries. He protects the town from supernatural threats while also serving as a spiritual advisor to troubled townsfolk. Despite his important role, he has a laid-back personality and casual speaking style. He is apologetic and self-sacrificing, which frustrates Mutsumi. Despite his outwardly cheerful demeanor, he struggles with trauma from the death of Mutsumi's great-grandmother during World War 2.
Buchio Ōishi (大石 ぶちお, Ōishi Buchio)
Voiced by: Yuki Kaji
The Ōishi's family cat, who is reborn as a nekomata at the start of the story. He is shy and emotionally sensitive, often crying and apologizing when faced with difficult situations, and is excessively polite, even to his family. He trains with Yuri to hone his transformation abilities while struggling to determine his life's direction.
Tazenbō Fuchibiyama (縁火山 太善坊, Fuchibiyama Tazenbo) / Occhan (おっちゃん, Otchan)
Voiced by: Jin Urayama
An old, one-winged tengu who assists Jiro in his spiritual duties.
Yuri Tachibana (立花 百合, Tachibana Yuri)
Voiced by: Yō Taichi
A kitsune who serves as Buchio's transformation tutor. She was born into a high-class family, but left after being disgusted by their elitism. Working at the local laundromat, she has a reserved personality, and resents Buchio for having a loving family.
Takumi Ōishi (大石 拓海, Ōishi Takumi)
Voiced by: Mutsumi Tamura
A human boy in the fourth grade and Buchio's brother. He is excitable and adventurous, and often gets into trouble.
Ryo Sano (佐野 龍, Sano Ryō)
Voiced by: Yūko Sanpei
A human boy in the fifth grade with a crush on Rain. He is friends with Takumi.
Rain Nakagawa (中川 虹, Nakagawa Rein)
Voiced by: Megumi Han
A half-kappa girl in the fifth grade. She has a crush on Ryo, but is very shy and has trouble expressing her feelings.
Taira Tanaka (田中 平, Tanaka Taira)
Voiced by: Kenji Hamada
A human man who is drinking buddies with Jiro, Yasu, Yuri, and Benmaru. He is empathetic and supportive of his friends.
Benmaru Kobayashi (小林 弁丸, Kobayashi Benmaru) / Betobeto-san (ベトベトサン)
Voiced by: Tatsumaru Tachibana
A Betobeto-san who is drinking buddies with Jiro, Yasu, Yuri, and Taira. He was once a void of loneliness that preyed on people, but he has since taken on a humanoid form.
Hayachiyo (早千代)
Voiced by: Yuko Kaida
A beast youkai who assists Jiro in his spiritual duties.
Gorozaemon Sanmoto (山本五郎左衛門, Sanmoto Gorōzaemon)
Voiced by: Satoshi Mikami
A demon king who serves as a representative and leader for the youkai of Japan. Though he takes the form of a human man, his true form is a large, hairy beast the size of one and a half Tokyo Domes. He runs an entertainment company in Tokyo and offers Buchio tutelage and life guidance.
Suzu Sakaki (坂木 すず, Sakaki Suzu)
Voiced by: Ayako Kawasumi
A nekomata who works for Sanmoto.
Chiaki Nishiya (西谷 千彰, Nishiya Chiaki) / Wagen (ワーゲン, Wāgen)
Voiced by: Tokuyoshi Kawashima
A tsukumogami of Kazuhiko's car, who was awakened after 40 years with the couple. He forms a friendship with Buchio and strives to take care of Kazuhiko.
Kazuhiko Nishiya (西谷 和彦, Nishiya Kazuhiko)
Voiced by: Hideyuki Tanaka
An old man who lives with Chiaki. His wife's recent death has made him morbid and concerned with how Chiaki will fare after his death.

== Media ==
=== Manga ===
No.	Japanese release date	Japanese ISBN
1	July 10, 2018	978-4-7816-1672-8
2	July 10, 2019	978-4-7816-1924-8
3	October 17, 2020	978-4-7816-1924-8
4	April 7, 2022	978-4-7816-2054-1
SS1	August 18, 2023	978-4-7816-2234-7
SS2	April 17, 2026	978-4-7816-2545-4

=== Anime ===
An anime adaptation was announced on the fourth volume of the manga on April 7, 2022. It was later confirmed to be a television series produced by Liden Films and directed by Aimi Yamauchi, with scripts written by Tomoko Konparu, characters designed by Shigemitsu Abe, and music composed by Avex Music Creative and Blue Bird's Nest. The series aired from April 7 to June 30, 2024, on the Animazing!!! programming block on all ANN affiliates, including ABC TV and TV Asahi. (Note: ABC and TV Asahi listed the series premiere on April 6, 2024, at 26:00, which is effectively April 7 at 2:00 a.m. JST.) The opening theme song is "Obake Himawari" (お化けひまわり, "Ghost Sunflower"), performed by Pii, while the ending theme song is "Iro no Naka" (イロノナカ), performed by Aoi Kubo. Crunchyroll licensed the series under the original title Tonari no Yōkai-san.

==== Episodes ====
No.	Title (Note: Every episode is untitled but all the titles are taken from Crunchyroll.)	Directed by (Note: Information is taken from the ending credits of each episode.)	Written by	Storyboarded by	Original release date
1	"Episode 1"; Transliteration: "Dai-ichi-wa" (Japanese: 第1話)	Aiya Yamauchi	Tomoko Konparu	Aiya Yamauchi	April 7, 2024
Buchio, a 20-year-old cat, is reborn as a nekomata. His family records a video of his transformation and hopes to upload it to YouTube, but Buchio is very shy and requests they do not. Mu-chan, a young human girl, tells the news to Jiro, a kind crow tengu. Buchio struggles to fill out paperwork so he can be added to the Youkai Rebirth Registry. Confused by his new existence as a youkai, Buchio visits Jiro and Tazenbo for guidance. Mu-chan sees a passing daidarabocchi while visiting Jiro. Jiro introduces Buchio to Yuri, a kitsune who offers to tutor Buchio in transformation magic. With practice, Buchio is able to give himself human hands. During an Obon festival, Mu-chan is visited by the spirit of her deceased grandfather, but is upset by the absence of her father, who is missing and presumed dead. She overhears her mother speaking to a detective who says Mu-chan's father was likely swallowed by the void, a dimension between the real world and the afterlife. Jiro resolves to act as a parental figure for Mu-chan in her father's absence. While walking home, Mu-chan sees a dark shadow in the forest.
2	"Episode 2"; Transliteration: "Dai-ni-wa" (Japanese: 第2話)	Ryoko Nakano	Tomoko Konparu	Ryoko Nakano	April 14, 2024
Mu-chan reflects on her father's disappearance. Though her memories of him are fond, she can no longer remember his voice. Yuri hosts a barbecue with Jiro, Buchio, and the kids, as well as her friends Taira (a 27-year-old human), Yasu (a 33-year-old okuri-itachi), and Benmaru (a 125-year-old Betobeto-san). Afterwards, Buchio wonders why he became a nekomata. Benmaru tells him he is confused because he has not found his raison d'être for why he was brought to life, something all youkai have. Jiro recommends he express his feelings of gratitude to his family. During a literature class, Rain the kappa drops an eraser, which is returned by Ryo, a human boy she has a crush on. Rain is overwhelmed by her emotions and faints. Rain's friend recommends she tell Ryo her feelings, but Rain is too shy. Rain asks Hanako-san for guidance, who advises she find a way to express her feelings without words by passing a baton to Ryo in the upcoming relay race. Mu-chan follows Jiro and Hayachiyo as they investigate a spiritual disturbance in the forest. Mu-chan is hypnotized by a snake spirit that compels her to weaken the barrier protecting a sacred cedar tree before she is rescued by Jiro. Buchio learns how to transform ordinary objects into a bow and arrow. Buchio asks Yuri about her family, which makes Yuri angry and upset. The students perform an athletic festival where they must climb through a spiderweb woven by a tsuchigumo and walk across planks of ice created by a yuki-onna, among other activities. Rain successfully passes the baton to Ryo in the relay race. Mu-chan once again sees a dark shadow in the forest before running into Benmaru. Benmaru reveals that before he took his present form he was a dark shadow himself, during which time he was overwhelmed by feelings of loneliness that drove him to prey on humans.
3	"Episode 3"; Transliteration: "Dai-san-wa" (Japanese: 第3話)	Yasuyuki Shinozaki	Tomoko Konparu	Masao Suzuki	April 21, 2024
Buchio reminisces about his life as a cat. After the Ōishis rescued him from a kite attack as a kitten, he witnessed Takumi's birth and lived with the family for many years. However, he is still uncertain about his reason for becoming a nekomata. While walking, Takumi and Buchio are attacked by a nue, but Buchio is able to scare it off by transforming into an archer. Buchio advances his training and is able to transform into Takumi; the two use this to play a prank on Takumi's mother, but she quickly sees through the ruse. Mu-chan's grandmother notices she is upset about Jiro and tells her a story from his past: A hundred years prior, Jiro saved the town from a flash flood by killing the snake spirit responsible. Jiro nearly drowned, but survived. Mu-chan tells Jiro she hates him risking his life and vows to protect him. Jiro suddenly collapses and disappears, leaving behind a single feather. In a flashback to the previous day, the snake returns as a vengeful spirit and seeks to destroy the cedar tree, which is Jiro's true body. While Jiro affirms his decision to save the town 100 years prior, he chooses to atone for the murder by accepting the snake's vengeful curse. Mu-chan, Tazenbo, Hayachiyo, Yuri, and Buchio go to the cedar tree to confront the snake spirit. Buchio transforms into Jiro, provoking the snake into relinquishing the tree. While the snake is distracted, Mu-chan uses cloth from her red Miko hakama to repair the tree's barrier. Jiro is reborn and makes peace with the snake, accepting its grudge and offering to welcome it when it reincarnates. This appeases the spirit, allowing it to pass on to the afterlife. In a flashback, it is revealed the snake was once a suijin married to a nobleman; however, the nobleman's mistress poisoned her, turning her into a snake and causing her to lash out against Fuchigamori in anguish. In a post-credits scene, a man looks at a picture of Buchio and expresses interest in his transformation.
4	"Episode 4"; Transliteration: "Dai-yon-wa" (Japanese: 第4話)	Ryōta Karasawa	Tomoko Konparu	Yuki Komoda	April 28, 2024
While fishing with his friends, Tazenbo sees a bunrei of the local dragon god in the river. The man from the previous post-credits scene is revealed to be Gorozaemon Sanmoto, a demon king and famous celebrity. Sanmoto invites Buchio to his office in Tokyo. Buchio meets Sanmoto's secretary, Suzu, who is a fellow nekomata. Back in Fuchigamori, Buchio tells the Ōishis his raison d'être for becoming a nekomata was to repay them for their kindness in raising him. Buchio wonders if he should get a job that aligns with his youkai powers, but Benmaru advises him to follow his passions instead. Buchio attends driving school to obtain a driver's license, and becomes friends with Chiaki, a recently-reborn car tsukumogami. The tengu meet with the dragon god, who takes the form of an idol. She warns Buchio to be wary of Sanmoto. Troubled by the warning, Buchio contacts Suzu. Suzu reveals that she became a nekomata due to negative emotions and nearly became a monster, but Sanmoto convinced her to choose a happier life. A black rift appears in the sky, depositing a feral raiju onto the school field. It rampages through the school, but Jiro is able to send it back to the clouds. In a hi-tech facility, scientists observe the rift and decide to investigate Fuchigamori.
5	"Episode 5"; Transliteration: "Dai-go-wa" (Japanese: 第5話)	Yūki Ikeda	Tomoko Konparu	Aiya Yamauchi	May 5, 2024 (Note: This episode aired at 2:30 a.m. JST, 30 minutes after the original air time on ABC Television.)
Yuri sells oshibana at a fair and Buchio meets Kazuhiko, Chiaki's elderly partner. The oshibana makes Kazuhiko reminisce about his wife, who died of illness last year. Yuri reminisces about her family, who are proud kitsune of noble heritage. She became disgusted with her father's elitism and obsession with racial hygiene, causing her to leave the family. Buchio advises Yuri to talk to her family, but this sends Yuri into a rage due to her envy of Buchio's happy family. That night, a group of railway workers see a train that is empty except for a single woman. The woman panics at the sight of youkai and runs away. The next day, an unknown woman enters Yuri's home, and both become dizzy and faint. Taira visits Yuri's house and talks to the woman, who is also called Yuri and recognizes Taira but thinks Buchio is an ordinary cat. Meanwhile, "our" Yuri wakes up in a parallel universe where youkai do not exist. In the youkai universe, investigators from the Space-Time Laboratory explain that the two Yuris switched universes due to a dimensional instability, and use a device to return them to their home universes.
6	"Episode 6"; Transliteration: "Dai-roku-wa" (Japanese: 第6話)	Moe Maehara	Tomoko Konparu	Tomoko Akiyama	May 12, 2024
Yuri apologizes for lashing out at Buchio. Yuri's little brother, Tsubaki, visits to tell her their mother is sick and begs Yuri to come home. Yuri agrees and speaks to her father, who says he stands by his beliefs and has no regrets. Yuri refuses to forgive him, but feels she has achieved closure, and chooses to maintain a relationship with Tsubaki and her mother. Buchio receives his driver's license. Mu-chan discovers Jiro has not yet replaced the damaged barrier, which frustrates her. In a post-credits scene, a group of students discuss a rumor that a stuffed tanuki in the science room is actually a bake-danuki with a vengeful spirit. Yusuke, an animate anatomical doll, warns the students against spreading dangerous rumors, as the power of kotodama can make them come true. After the students leave, a spirit animates the stuffed tanuki.
7	"Episode 7"; Transliteration: "Dai-nana-wa" (Japanese: 第7話)	Ryoko Nakano	Tomoko Konparu	Ryoko Nakano	May 19, 2024
Buchio and Chiaki travel to the ocean, where they see an umibozu. Chiaki confides that Kazuhiko has been depressed since his wife's passing and is overly fixated on his own death. This causes Buchio to realize that, as nekomata have longer lifespans than humans, he will outlive his family, which makes him depressed. Chiaki ruminates on Kazuhiko's relationship with his wife, beginning a flashback of their life together. His wife's ancestor was a basho spirit, causing her to become terminally ill when the basho plant died. Mu-chan helps Jiro weave a new barrier. Jiro states that he has a very good memory, and even remembers events from long ago. He relates a story about Mu-chan's grandmother when she was a young girl, which makes Mu-chan ask about her great-grandmother. This makes Jiro dissociate and flash back to his memories of Mu-chan's great-grandmother, who was named Haru. Mu-chan confesses to Hayachiyo that she loves Jiro, but is upset when he puts himself in danger. Mu-chan's grandmother shows her a photo Jiro took of Haru when she was a young woman.
8	"Episode 8"; Transliteration: "Dai-hachi-wa" (Japanese: 第8話)	Ryūta Yamamoto	Tomoko Konparu	Ryūta Yamamoto	May 26, 2024
Sanmoto invites Buchio on a trip to England, where magic is very powerful due to an abundance of ley lines and power spots. Takumi's mother senses Buchio is depressed and affirms that she sees him as a son. In England, Sanmoto reveals the purpose of the trip was to make Buchio confront his fear of loneliness by experiencing separation from his family. After returning to Japan, Buchio has tea with the Nishiyas, and Kazuhiko asks him to take care of Chiaki after he dies. This upsets Chiaki, who wants Kazuhiko to live in the moment. Chiaki reveals that before she died, Kazuhiko's wife asked him to take care of Kazuhiko in her place. The students believe Ryo and Rain are dating, but Ryo stifles the rumors by acting aloof towards Rain. Jiro searches his storage shed for paper, but discovers it has been infested by mokumokuren. Mu-chan finds an old camera and asks Jiro about the photo of Haru, which causes Jiro to have a panic attack. Jiro apologizes, which upsets Mu-chan due to PTSD from Jiro frequently apologizing before putting himself in danger. In a flashback, Haru tells Jiro she is engaged, and her mother is excited to see the wedding before she dies. However, Haru's mother dies of illness before the wedding, causing Haru to feel guilty that she could not fulfill her mother's last wish. Later, Haru's son and best friend are killed in an earthquake, and her husband dies in battle during World War 2, causing her to believe she is cursed. Haru dies in a bombing attack, and with her last words asks Jiro to forget her. However, Jiro is unable to forget, causing him to feel that he has betrayed her.
9	"Episode 9"; Transliteration: "Dai-kyū-wa" (Japanese: 第9話)	Yūichi Sato	Tomoko Konparu	Yuki Komoda	June 2, 2024
Rain's doctor explains that she is at risk of entering a state of hibernation due to the winter cold, and advises she avoid cold water. Ryo feels guilty for avoiding Rain and wishes to apologize. Ryo's friends drop a soccer ball into the river and Ryo attempts to retrieve it, but falls into a spatial distortion created by the sleeping dragon god. Rain rescues him, but falls into hibernation and cannot escape herself. Jiro attempts to commune with the dragon god to rescue her, but starts to be pulled in as well. Despite his warnings, Mu-chan rallies the children to help him, and together they rescue Rain. Rain awakens in the hospital a week later and Ryo apologizes to her. Mu-chan chastises Jiro for attempting to do everything himself, and Jiro promises to be less reckless in the future. Jiro confides his difficulty in forgetting Haru, but Mu-chan convinces him to remember her instead. Mu-chan's grandmother finds a letter penned by Haru shortly before her death telling Jiro to disregard her dying wish. Jiro replaces the barrier around the cedar tree and creates a charm from a tree branch and Mu-chan's hakama. In a post-credits scene, the dragon god reawakens during the New Year's festival. The dark shadow reaches for Mu-chan, but she does not notice.
10	"Episode 10"; Transliteration: "Dai-jū-wa" (Japanese: 第10話)	Misato Takada	Tomoko Konparu	Yasuyuki Shinozaki	June 9, 2024
Hayachiyo sees an oni in the forest and visits Isshin, a human musician she is in love with. Mu-chan makes her own charm, which Jiro completes with a bean cooked by his fire magic. Mu-chan is attacked by the dark shadow, but she realizes it is actually the spirit of her father. Jiro is able to convince the shadow to become a Betobeto-san, but he has no memories and is not sapient. The family names him "Ma-san".
11	"Episode 11"; Transliteration: "Dai-jūichi-wa" (Japanese: 第11話)	Moe Maehara	Tomoko Konparu	Tomoko Akiyama	June 16, 2024
Spatial distortions are increasing, leading to rumors that the boundary between parallel worlds is breaking down. This excites Takumi, who interviews two Space-Time Laboratory researchers; however, they refuse to reveal any information. Buchio and Takumi learn that Tagenbo, the village tengu before Tazenbo, sacrificed himself to save the village from a meteorite in the year 1523, and this has some connection to the dimensional rifts. Buchio compliments Takumi on his passion for video-making, but Takumi is disillusioned due to his friends telling him it is difficult to become a successful filmmaker. Buchio, Chiaki, and Takumi travel to Tokyo, where a massive dimensional rift opens in the sky and disgorges a horde of oni.
12	"Episode 12"; Transliteration: "Dai-jūni-wa" (Japanese: 第12話)	Hazuki Mizumoto	Tomoko Konparu	Yasuhiro Tanabe	June 23, 2024
Oni rampage across Japan while tengu attempt to protect the citizens. Sanmoto is cut off from his avatars spread across Earth, forcing him to revert to a small bat-like form with no powers. Taira and Yuri slay an oni who has boarded their airplane, causing it to crumble into sand. Kazuhiko escapes a group of oni by distracting them with a voice recording of Chiaki. Ma-san leaves the house and is attacked by oni, but Mu-chan rescues him by throwing Jiro's baked bean, which releases Jiro's fire magic and stuns the oni. Kotodama fades due to the boundary break, causing youkai to weaken and revert to mundane objects. Yusuke and Chiaki become inanimate. Buchio takes human form to save Takumi from an oni attack. Jiro erects a magical barrier to protect the Sugimoto family from oni, but one oni slips through. Mu-chan realizes the oni is composed of her father's memories, which were separated from his soul when he was taken by the void. Using kotodama, she transforms the oni into an image of her father, which awakens Ma-san's ego. The Space-Time Laboratory faces manpower shortages as their youkai members die, and warn that the world is about to be "inverted".
13	"Episode 13"; Transliteration: "Dai-jūsan-wa" (Japanese: 第13話)	Aiya Yamauchi, Yuki Komoda & Moe Maehara	Tomoko Konparu	Shinobu Yoshioka, Aiya Yamauchi & Yuki Komoda	June 30, 2024
The dragon god dies as youkai across Japan lose their powers. Buchio and Suzu revert to normal cats and die. Rain turns into water and Jiro turns into wind. Takumi, Ryo, and Mu-chan awaken in a white void with no memories. By talking with one another, they remember their loved ones and are able to use kotodama to restore the youkai to life. However, Sanmoto disappears. Spring break is extended to give the students time to recover from the traumatic events. Takumi decides to pursue his passion for filmmaking. In a meeting with the Tengu Association, Jiro explains the true nature of oni and theorizes that they became dangerous due to kotodama from the erroneous belief they were monsters. Ma-san cannot remember his life as Mu-chan's father, but the Sugimoto family allows him to stay with them. Rain and Ryo confess their feelings for one another. Ma-san goes to Buchio for advice, causing Buchio to become embarrassed when he realizes he is now someone else's mentor. Jiro sees a white-haired infant and realizes they are the reincarnation of the suijin he killed. Takumi's brother teaches him about filmmaking, and Hayachiyo performs a song with Isshin. In a post-credits scene Jiro notes that it is summer once again, ending on a shot of the sky that mirrors the opening of the first episode.
