= Yokoi Yayū =

Japanese linguist, poet and philosopher

Yokoi Yayū (横井 也有)
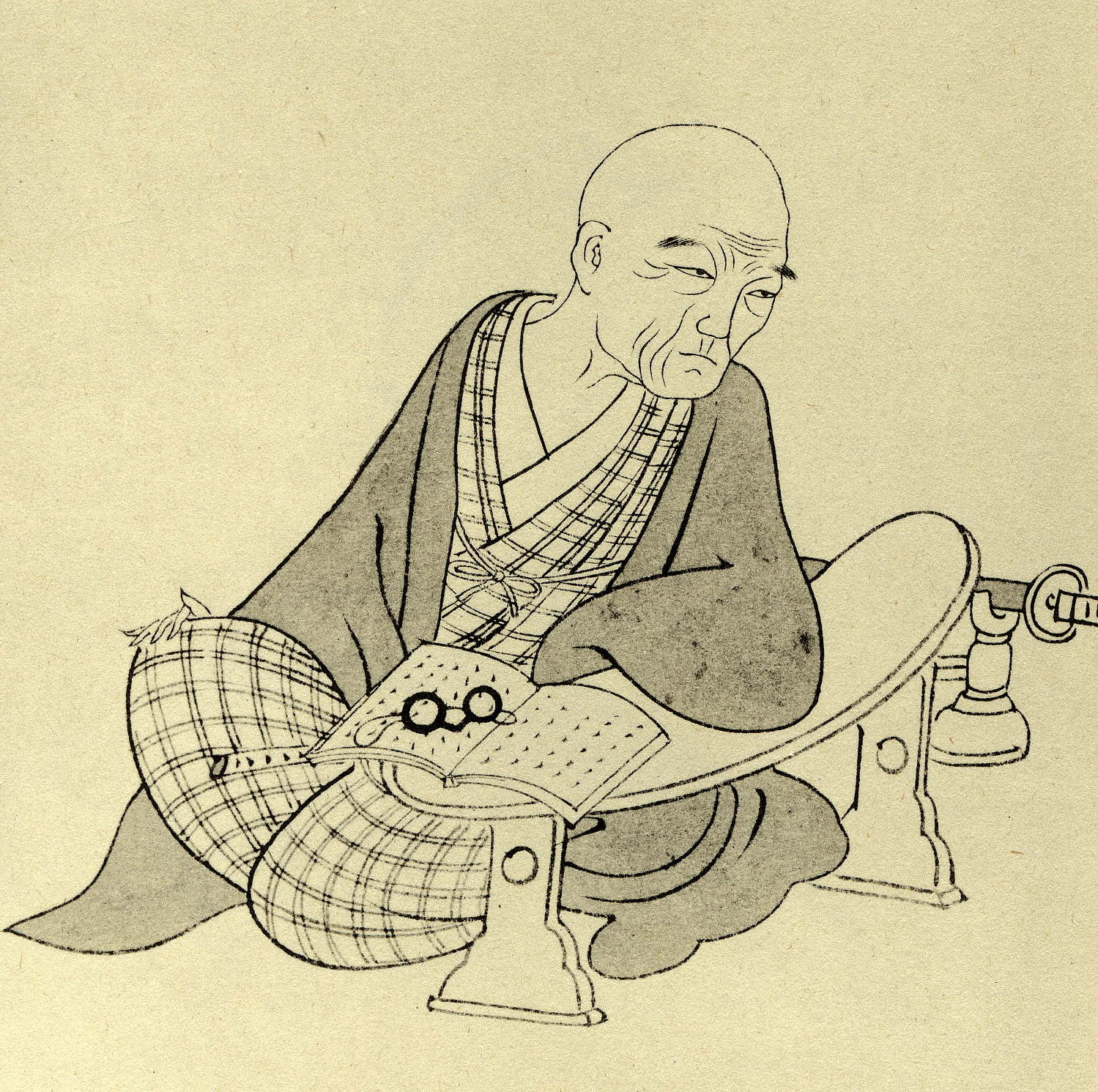
- Yokoi Yayū
- Born: Yokoi Tokitsura (横井 時般); October 24, 1702; Nagoya
- Died: July 15, 1783 (aged 80)
- Occupation: Poet
- Writing career
- Pen name: Tatsunojō
- Notable work: Uzuragoromo 鶉衣(The Quail's Cloak)

Yokoi Yayū (横井 也有; October 24, 1702 – July 15, 1783) was a Japanese samurai best known for his haibun, a scholar of Kokugaku, and haikai poet. He was born Yokoi Tokitsura (横井 時般), and took the pseudonym Tatsunojō. His family are believed to be descendants of Hōjō Tokiyuki.

== Life ==
Yayū was born in Nagoya, the first son of Yokoi Tokihira (時衡) who served the Owari Domain. He inherited the Yokoi House's patrimony at twenty-six and held important posts of the Owari Domain. He was for example yōnin (manager of general affairs), Ōbangashira (chief of guard) and Jisha-Bugyō (manager of religious affairs). In 1754, at age 53, he retired for health reasons. Yayū moved to Maezu (前津) (now in Naka-ku, Nagoya), and lived in the Chiutei (知雨亭) hermitage. He was a prolific and respected composer of haibun, Classical Chinese poems, waka and Japanese satirical poems, and was an adept of the Japanese tea ceremony.

== Works ==
Yayū also excelled in Japanese martial arts, studied Confucianism and learned haikai from Mutō Hajaku (武藤巴雀) and Ōta Hajō (太田巴静). Hajaku and Hajō were pupils of Kagami Shikō (各務支考), a leading disciple of Matsuo Bashō. Mori Senzō (森銑三), a student of old Japanese literature, compared his hokku to senryū, and said they were not as interesting as his haibun. Yayū has been described as a master of haibun, and Nagai Kafū 永井荷風 called Yayū's haibun a model of Japanese prose.

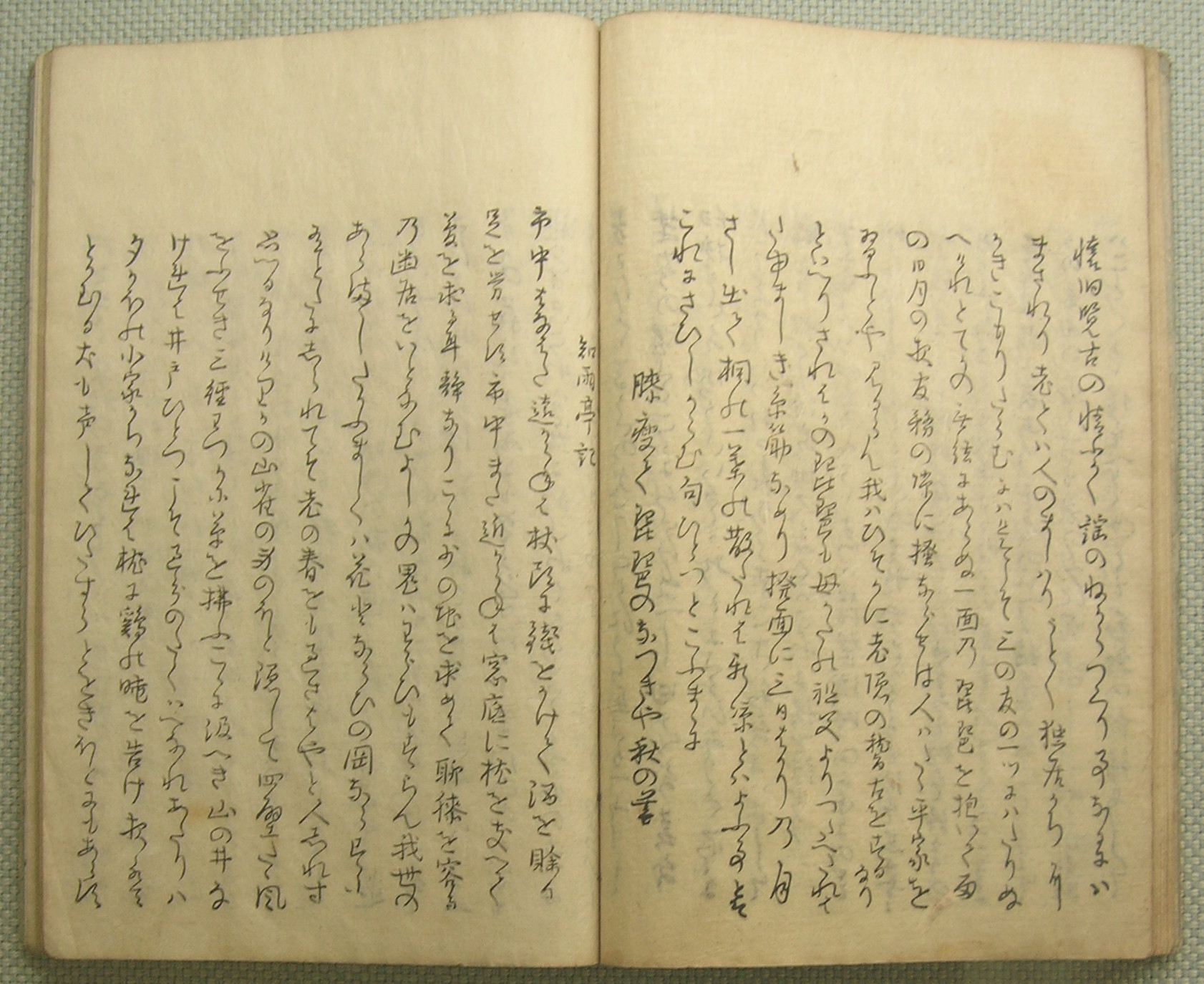
Uzuragoromo

- "Uzuragoromo" (鶉衣) : An anthology of haibun, partially translated in Monumenta Nipponica, vol. 34, no. 3, Autumn 1979, by Lawrence Rogers.
- "Rayō Shū", "Tetsu Shū" (蘿葉集), (垤集): Anthology of haiku.
- "More Oke" (漏桶): Anthology of renku
- "Kankensō" (管見草): Essay on haikai
- "Rain Hen" (蘿隠編): Prose and poetry in Classical Chinese
- "Gyō-Gyō-Shi" (行々子): An anthology of Japanese satirical poems

== See also ==
- Haibun
- Haiku
