= Shikō =

- Gender: Male

Origin
- Origin: Japanese
- Meaning: Different meanings depending on the kanji used

Shikō, Shiko or Shikou (commonly written: 志功 or 紫紅) is a masculine Japanese given name. Notable people with the name include:

- Kagami Shikō (各務 支考) (1665-1731), Japanese haiku poet
- Shikō Imamura (今村 紫紅) (1880–1916), Japanese artist
- Shikō Munakata (棟方 志功) (1903–1975), Japanese printmaker and painter

Shiko (四股) may also refer to a leg-raising exercise in sumo.
