= Suwa Yorishige =

Suwa Yorishige may refer to:

- Suwa Yorishige (daimyo), Japanese samurai daimyo of the Shinano province
- Suwa Yorishige (Nanboku-chō period), military commander during the Nanboku-chō period
