= Muneshige =

- Gender: Male

Origin
- Origin: Japanese
- Meaning: Different meanings depending on the kanji used

Muneshige (written: 宗茂 or 宗鎮) is a masculine Japanese given name. Notable people with the name include:

- Hachisuka Muneshige (蜂須賀 宗鎮; 1721–1780), Japanese daimyō
- Tachibana Muneshige (立花 宗茂; 1567–1643), Japanese samurai and daimyō
- Godaiin Muneshige (五大院 宗繁; Unknown), Japanese samurai
