= Bad Girl (manga) =

Japanese manga series

- First tankōbon volume cover, featuring Yuu Yuutani

ばっどがーる (Baddo Gāru)
- Genre: Comedy; Yuri
- Manga
- Written by: Nikumaru
- Published by: Houbunsha
- English publisher: NA: Yen Press
- Imprint: Manga Time KR Comics
- Magazine: Manga Time Kirara Carat
- Original run: March 27, 2021 – present
- Volumes: 6
- Anime television series
- Directed by: Jōji Furuta
- Written by: Shōji Yonemura
- Music by: Arisa Okehazama
- Studio: Bridge
- Licensed by: Sentai Filmworks: SA/SEA: Medialink
- Original network: Tokyo MX, BS11, HTB, RCC, AT-X
- Original run: July 6, 2025 – September 21, 2025
- Episodes: 12
- icon

Bad Girl (Japanese: ばっどがーる, Hepburn: Baddo Gāru) is a Japanese four-panel manga series written and illustrated by Nikumaru. It has been serialized in Houbunsha's seinen manga magazine Manga Time Kirara Carat since March 2021, with its chapters collected into six tankōbon volumes as of July 2026. An anime television series adaptation produced by Bridge aired from July to September 2025.

== Plot ==
Yuu Yuutani is a good and studious first-year high school student who attends Fujigasaki Private High School. Worshipping the school's displinary committee chairman and madonna Atori Mizutori, Yuu starts acting like a delinquent in the hopes of attracting Atori's attention.

== Characters ==
Yuu Yuutani (優谷 優, Yūtani Yū)
Voiced by: Azusa Tachibana (Japanese); Monica Rial (English)
A high school girl who greatly admires Atori. Despite appearance, she is actually an honor student. However, she decides to change her personality and become a "bad girl" to gain Atori's attention.
Atori Mizutori (水鳥 亜鳥, Mizutori Atori)
Voiced by: Niina Hanamiya (Japanese); Luci Christian (English)
A third-year student and Yuu's upperclassman and the most popular student in school. As the chair of the discipline committee, she is so popular that she has her own fan club.
Suzu Suzukaze (涼風 涼, Suzukaze Suzu)
Voiced by: Misato Matsuoka (Japanese); Kira Vincent-Davis (English)
Yuu's childhood friend, who has the appearance of a gyaru. In contrast to Yuu, she actually acts like her appearance. Unlike most students in school, she does not think positively of Atori.
Rura Ruriha (瑠璃葉 るら, Ruriha Rura)
Voiced by: Miharu Hanai (Japanese); Brittney Karbowski (English)
A second-year student and a popular streamer. After finding out that Yuu is not familiar with her, she does everything she can to gain Yuu's attention.
Kiyoraka Sumiki (清木 清, Sumiki Kiyoraka)
Voiced by: Lynn (Japanese); Katelyn Barr (English)
Mizuka Mizutori (水鳥 水花, Mizutori Mizuka)
Voiced by: Kaori Maeda (Japanese); Alyssa Marek (English)
A first-year student and Atori's younger sister. She is deeply attached to her sister.
Maria Komari (小鞠 まりあ, Komari Maria)
Voiced by: Yui Horie (Japanese); Hilary Haag (English)
Nana Matsuda (松田 なな, Matsuda Nana)
Voiced by: Sora Amamiya (Japanese); Ginger Sue (English)
Marimo Nishikawa (西川 まりも, Nishikawa Marimo)
Voiced by: Ayane Sakura (Japanese); Shelby Blocker (English)
Rin Mōri (毛利 りん, Mōri Rin)
Voiced by: Sumire Uesaka (Japanese); Amanda Cielo (English)
Yume Izumi (泉 ゆめ, Izumi Yume)
Voiced by: Saori Hayami (Japanese); Nickolette Kong (English)
Aoi Aoyama (青山 あおい, Aoyama Aoi)
Voiced by: Maaya Uchida (Japanese); Chaney Moore (English)
Momiji Kaname (鹿目 もみじ, Kaname Momiji)
Voiced by: Akari Kitō (Japanese); Annie Wild (English)

== Media ==
=== Manga ===
Written and illustrated by Nikumaru, Bad Girl was initially published in Houbunsha's Manga Time Kirara Carat magazine as a guest work before beginning serialization on March 27, 2021. As of July 2026, six tankōbon volumes have been released.

During its panel at Anime NYC 2025, Yen Press announced that it had licensed the series for English publication.

==== Volumes ====
No.	Original release date	Original ISBN	English release date	English ISBN
1	January 26, 2022	978-4-8322-7346-7	March 24, 2026	979-8-8554-1755-5
2	November 26, 2022	978-4-8322-7421-1	August 25, 2026	979-8-8554-1757-9
3	August 25, 2023	978-4-8322-7478-5	January 26, 2027	979-8-8554-1759-3
4	July 25, 2024	978-4-8322-9562-9	—	—
5	July 26, 2025	978-4-8322-9649-7	—	—
6	July 27, 2026	978-4-8322-9736-4	—	—

=== Anime ===
An anime television series adaptation was announced on June 28, 2024. It is produced by Bridge and directed by Jōji Furuta, with series composition handled by Shōji Yonemura, characters designed by Yūki Morimoto, and music composed by Arisa Okehazama. The series aired from July 6 to September 21, 2025, on Tokyo MX and other networks. (Note: Tokyo MX and BS11 listed the series premiere on July 5, 2025, at 25:00, which is effectively July 6 at 1:00 a.m. JST.) The opening theme song is "Super Big Love!" (すーぱーびっぐらぶ！), and the ending theme song is "Bad Surprise", both performed by Tenrogun (天狼群), a unit composed of Azusa Tachibana, Niina Hanamiya, Misato Matsuoka, and Miharu Hanai as their respective characters. Sentai Filmworks licensed the series in North America for streaming on Hidive; prior to its streaming debut, it premiered at Anime Expo on July 4, 2025. An English-language dubbing premiered on Hidive on October 29, 2025. Medialink licensed the series in Asia-Pacific for streaming on Ani-One Asia's YouTube channel.

==== Episodes ====
No.	Title	Directed by (Note: Production staff information is taken from the ending credits of each episode.)	Written by	Storyboarded by	Original release date
1	"As of Today, I'm a Bad Girl!"; Transliteration: "Kyō kara Baddo Gāru" (Japanese: 今日からばっどがーる♡)	Akira Tsunoda	Shōji Yonemura	Jōji Furuta	July 6, 2025
1	"I Wanna Be a Bad Girl!"; Transliteration: "Waruiko ni Naritai" (Japanese: 悪い子になりたい♡)	Akira Tsunoda	Shōji Yonemura	Jōji Furuta	July 6, 2025
1	"Dog Ears and a Collar"; Transliteration: "Kubiwa to Inu Mimi" (Japanese: 首輪と犬耳)	Akira Tsunoda	Shōji Yonemura	Jōji Furuta	July 6, 2025
1	"Suzukaze-san's Many Misunderstandings!"; Transliteration: "Suzukaze-san wa Gokaisare Yasui" (Japanese: 涼風さんは誤解されやすい)	Akira Tsunoda	Shōji Yonemura	Jōji Furuta	July 6, 2025
2	"Natural-Born Ero-ist"; Transliteration: "Nachuraru Bōn Erorisuto" (Japanese: ナチュラル・ボーン・エロリスト)	Kayoko Suzuki	Shōji Yonemura	Jōji Furuta	July 13, 2025
2	"Secret Club"; Transliteration: "Himitsu no Kurabu" (Japanese: 秘密のクラブ)	Kayoko Suzuki	Shōji Yonemura	Jōji Furuta	July 13, 2025
2	"Please Tell Me!"; Transliteration: "Oshiete Kudasai" (Japanese: 教えてください)	Kayoko Suzuki	Shōji Yonemura	Jōji Furuta	July 13, 2025
2	"Rura-chan Wants to Be Pampered"; Transliteration: "Rura-chan wa Chiyahoya Saretai" (Japanese: るらちゃんはチヤホヤされたい)	Kayoko Suzuki	Shōji Yonemura	Jōji Furuta	July 13, 2025
3	"I Hate You"; Transliteration: "Daikkirai" (Japanese: だいっきらい♡)	Yūto Nakamura	Shōji Yonemura	Yūto Nakamura & Jōji Furuta	July 20, 2025
3	"Is Ruu Cute?"; Transliteration: "Rū tte Kawaii?" (Japanese: るーってかわいい？)	Yūto Nakamura	Shōji Yonemura	Yūto Nakamura & Jōji Furuta	July 20, 2025
3	"First Kiss"; Transliteration: "Fāsuto Kissu" (Japanese: ふぁーすときっす♡)	Yūto Nakamura	Shōji Yonemura	Yūto Nakamura & Jōji Furuta	July 20, 2025
3	"Suzukaze-san's Many Misunderstandings!"; Transliteration: "Suzukaze-san wa Gokaisare Yasui" (Japanese: 涼風さんは誤解されやすい)	Yūto Nakamura	Shōji Yonemura	Yūto Nakamura & Jōji Furuta	July 20, 2025
4	"ADC Committee Assemble!"; Transliteration: "ADC Kanbu Sōkai ni Shūgō Seyo" (Japanese: ADC幹部総会ニ集合セヨ)	Katsuyuki Komai	Jōji Furuta	Shinji Ishihira	July 27, 2025
4	"The Secret Classroom"; Transliteration: "Himitsu no Kyōshitsu" (Japanese: 秘密の教室)	Katsuyuki Komai	Jōji Furuta	Shinji Ishihira	July 27, 2025
4	"A Rendez-vous with Rura Ruriha"; Transliteration: "Rurirura Randebū" (Japanese: るりるら・ランデブー)	Katsuyuki Komai	Jōji Furuta	Shinji Ishihira	July 27, 2025
4	"Rura-chan Wants to Be Pampered"; Transliteration: "Rura-chan wa Chiyahoya Saretai" (Japanese: るらちゃんはちやほやされたい)	Katsuyuki Komai	Jōji Furuta	Shinji Ishihira	July 27, 2025
5	"Shijimi and Hotate"; Transliteration: "Shijimi to Hotate" (Japanese: しじみとホタテ)	Yoshitaka Nagaoka	Hiroshi Iijima	Jōji Furuta	August 3, 2025
5	"Bool!"; Transliteration: "Wakkoii" (Japanese: わっこいい♡)	Yoshitaka Nagaoka	Hiroshi Iijima	Jōji Furuta	August 3, 2025
5	"I've Got You Now!"; Transliteration: "Manaita e Yōkoso" (Japanese: まな板へようこそ)	Yoshitaka Nagaoka	Hiroshi Iijima	Jōji Furuta	August 3, 2025
5	"Suzukaze-san's Many Misunderstandings!"; Transliteration: "Suzukaze-san wa Gokaisare Yasui" (Japanese: 涼風さんは誤解されやすい)	Yoshitaka Nagaoka	Hiroshi Iijima	Jōji Furuta	August 3, 2025
6	"Violent Times"; Transliteration: "Jidai wa Bōryoku" (Japanese: 時代は暴力)	Akira Tsunoda	Shōji Yonemura	Jōji Furuta	August 10, 2025
6	"Four-lling in Love"; Transliteration: "Fōrin Rabu" (Japanese: 4(フォー)リンラブ)	Akira Tsunoda	Shōji Yonemura	Jōji Furuta	August 10, 2025
6	"Heaven and Hell"; Transliteration: "Jigoku de Tengoku" (Japanese: 地獄で天国♡)	Akira Tsunoda	Shōji Yonemura	Jōji Furuta	August 10, 2025
6	"Suzukaze-san Wants to Be by Her Side"; Transliteration: "Suzukaze-san wa Tonari ni Itai" (Japanese: 涼風さんはとなりに居たい)	Akira Tsunoda	Shōji Yonemura	Jōji Furuta	August 10, 2025
7	"Clothes Change Chaos"; Transliteration: "Koromogae Panikku" (Japanese: 衣替えパニック)	Akihiko Sano	Jōji Furuta	Akihiko Sano	August 17, 2025
7	"The Enemy Is Within the Classroom"; Transliteration: "Teki wa Kyōshitsu ni Ari" (Japanese: 敵ハ教室ニアリ)	Akihiko Sano	Jōji Furuta	Akihiko Sano	August 17, 2025
7	"Welcome to Cafe Scramble!"; Transliteration: ""Kafe Sukuranburu" e Yōkoso!" (Japanese: 『カフェ・すくらんぶる』へようこそ！)	Akihiko Sano	Jōji Furuta	Akihiko Sano	August 17, 2025
7	"Rura-chan Wants to Be Pampered"; Transliteration: "Rura-chan wa Chiyahoya Saretai" (Japanese: るらちゃんはチヤホヤされたい)	Akihiko Sano	Jōji Furuta	Akihiko Sano	August 17, 2025
8	"A Co-Ord Based on Vibes"; Transliteration: "Kanjiru Kōde" (Japanese: 感じるコーデ)	Kenya Ueno	Shōji Yonemura	Jōji Furuta	August 24, 2025
8	"Confession"; Transliteration: "Kokuhaku" (Japanese: こくはく♡)	Kenya Ueno	Shōji Yonemura	Jōji Furuta	August 24, 2025
8	"She's Here!"; Transliteration: "Orareru" (Japanese: おられる♡)	Kenya Ueno	Shōji Yonemura	Jōji Furuta	August 24, 2025
8	"A Troublesome Senpai's Interest in Her Kouhai"; Transliteration: "Yakkai na Senpai ni Kiniirarete Shimatta Kōhai-chan" (Japanese: やっかいな先輩に気に入られてしまった後輩ちゃん)	Kenya Ueno	Shōji Yonemura	Jōji Furuta	August 24, 2025
9	"Something Bad"; Transliteration: "Ikenai Koto" (Japanese: イケないこと♡)	Yūto Nakamura	Jōji Furuta	Jōji Furuta	August 31, 2025
9	"Another Mountain"; Transliteration: "Saranaru Itadaki" (Japanese: さらなるいただき)	Yūto Nakamura	Jōji Furuta	Jōji Furuta	August 31, 2025
9	"I'll Tempt You!"; Transliteration: "Yatchaō ka na" (Japanese: やっちゃおうかな♡)	Yūto Nakamura	Jōji Furuta	Jōji Furuta	August 31, 2025
9	"Suzukaze-san's Many Misunderstandings!"; Transliteration: "Suzukaze-san wa Gokaisare Yasui" (Japanese: 涼風さんは誤解されやすい)	Yūto Nakamura	Jōji Furuta	Jōji Furuta	August 31, 2025
10	"In the Private Study Room"; Transliteration: "Jishūshitsu de" (Japanese: 自習室で♡)	Katsuyuki Komai	Shōji Yonemura	Katsuyuki Komai & Jōji Furuta	September 7, 2025
10	"Gripping Rather Than Grabbing"; Transliteration: "Tsukami yori Nigiri" (Japanese: つかみよりにぎり♡)	Katsuyuki Komai	Shōji Yonemura	Katsuyuki Komai & Jōji Furuta	September 7, 2025
10	"In My Room"; Transliteration: "Oheya de Shiyo" (Japanese: お部屋でしよ♡)	Katsuyuki Komai	Shōji Yonemura	Katsuyuki Komai & Jōji Furuta	September 7, 2025
10	"Suzukaze-san's Many Misunderstandings!"; Transliteration: "Suzukaze-san wa Gokaisare Yasui" (Japanese: 涼風さんは誤解されやすい)	Katsuyuki Komai	Shōji Yonemura	Katsuyuki Komai & Jōji Furuta	September 7, 2025
11	"A Really Fun Toy"; Transliteration: "Tanoshii Omocha" (Japanese: 楽しいおもちゃ)	Masakazu Yoshimoto	Jōji Furuta	Jōji Furuta	September 14, 2025
11	"Yuri-Track Camp"; Transliteration: "Yurikyan" (Japanese: ゆりきゃん×)	Masakazu Yoshimoto	Jōji Furuta	Jōji Furuta	September 14, 2025
11	"Wibutt"; Transliteration: "Yajiri" (Japanese: やじり)	Masakazu Yoshimoto	Jōji Furuta	Jōji Furuta	September 14, 2025
11	"Rura-chan Wants to Be Pampered"; Transliteration: "Rura-chan wa Chiyahoya Saretai" (Japanese: るらちゃんはチヤホヤされたい)	Masakazu Yoshimoto	Jōji Furuta	Jōji Furuta	September 14, 2025
12	"Goodbye"; Transliteration: "Sayonara" (Japanese: さよなら)	Akihiko Sano	Shōji Yonemura	Jōji Furuta	September 21, 2025
12	"I'll Give You All of Them!"; Transliteration: "Zenbu Agemasu" (Japanese: ぜんぶあげます♡)	Akihiko Sano	Shōji Yonemura	Jōji Furuta	September 21, 2025
12	"The Ultimate Bad Girl"; Transliteration: "Saikyō no Baddo Gāru" (Japanese: 最強のばっどがーる♡)	Akihiko Sano	Shōji Yonemura	Jōji Furuta	September 21, 2025
12	"Suzu-chan Is All Mine"; Transliteration: "Suzu-chan wa Watashi Senyō" (Japanese: 涼ちゃんは私専用)	Akihiko Sano	Shōji Yonemura	Jōji Furuta	September 21, 2025

== Reception ==
Bad Girl was nominated for the 2022 Next Manga Awards in the printed manga category; it was also nominated in the same category for the 2023 edition.

== See also ==
- Someone's Girlfriend, another manga series by the same author
