= Someone's Girlfriend =

Japanese manga series

- First tankōbon volume cover

アイツノカノジョ (Aitsu no Kanojo)
- Genre: Romantic comedy
- Manga
- Written by: Nikumaru
- Published by: Shogakukan
- English publisher: NA: Seven Seas Entertainment
- Imprint: Sunday Webry Comics
- Magazine: Sunday Webry
- Original run: September 30, 2022 – November 21, 2025
- Volumes: 8
- icon

Someone's Girlfriend (Japanese: アイツノカノジョ, Hepburn: Aitsu no Kanojo) is a Japanese web manga series written and illustrated by Nikumaru. It was serialized on Shogakukan's digital platform Sunday Webry from September 2022 to November 2025, with its chapters collected in eight tankōbon volumes.

== Media ==
=== Manga ===
Written and illustrated by Nikumaru, Someone's Girlfriend was first published as a one-shot on Shogakukan's digital platform Sunday Webry on November 27, 2021, and was serialized on the same platform from September 30, 2022, to November 21, 2025. Shogakukan collected its chapters in eight tankōbon volumes, released from February 10, 2023, to December 12, 2025.

The manga has been licensed for English released in North America by Seven Seas Entertainment.

==== Volumes ====
No.	Original release date	Original ISBN	English release date	English ISBN
1	February 10, 2023	978-4-09-851600-1	August 27, 2024	979-8-89160-277-9
2	August 9, 2023	978-4-09-852773-1	December 17, 2024	979-8-89160-278-6
3	January 12, 2024	978-4-09-853083-0	April 22, 2025	979-8-89160-929-7
4	June 11, 2024	978-4-09-853397-8	September 9, 2025	979-8-89373-735-6
5	October 10, 2024	978-4-09-853624-5	January 20, 2026	979-8-89561-186-9
6	February 12, 2025	978-4-09-853846-1	May 12, 2026	979-8-89561-923-0
7	August 8, 2025	978-4-09-854125-6	October 13, 2026	979-8-89765-936-4
8	December 12, 2025	978-4-09-854364-9	—	—

=== Others ===
As part of a collaboration between Weekly Shōnen Sunday, Sunday Webry and the music project Maisondes, a music video with a song, titled "Furi", composed by Daibakuhashin, performed by Rei and based on the manga was uploaded to the Maisondes' YouTube channel on April 4, 2025.

== Reception ==
The series was nominated for the 2023 Next Manga Award in the web manga category, and ranked 20th in the same category in 2024.

== See also ==
- Bad Girl, another manga series by the same author
