= Trapezium (novel) =

Novel by Kazumi Takayama

- Novel volume cover

トラペジウム (Torapejiumu)
- Genre: Coming-of-age
- Serial novel
- Written by: Kazumi Takayama
- Illustrated by: Tae
- Published by: Kadokawa Shoten
- English publisher: NA: Seven Seas Entertainment
- Magazine: Da Vinci
- Original run: April 6, 2016 – August 6, 2018
- Volumes: 1
- Anime film
- Directed by: Masahiro Shinohara
- Written by: Yūko Kakihara
- Music by: Masaru Yokoyama
- Studio: CloverWorks
- Licensed by: Crunchyroll
- Released: May 10, 2024
- Runtime: 94 minutes
- Manga
- Written by: Kazumi Takayama
- Illustrated by: Kina Kazuharu
- Published by: Kadokawa Shoten
- Magazine: KadoComi
- Original run: February 26, 2025 – March 4, 2026
- Volumes: 1
- icon

Trapezium (トラペジウム, Torapejiumu) is a Japanese novel written by Kazumi Takayama while she was a member of Nogizaka46. It was initially serialized in Kadokawa Shoten's Da Vinci book and manga news magazine from April 2016 to August 2018. Kadokawa Shoten later published the novel in print with cover art by Tae in November 2018. An anime film adaptation produced by CloverWorks premiered in Japan in May 2024. A manga adaptation illustrated by Kina Kazuharu was serialized on Kadokawa Shoten's KadoComi website from February 2025 to March 2026.

== Premise ==
Yū Azuma, a first-year high school student, will do anything in order to become an idol. She selects and befriends three other girls so that they could become the shining stars of the north, east, west and south, manipulating events as part of her master plan to push the group on the path to stardom. However, being an idol means living by certain rules, and the others might not have the same drive Azuma has...

== Characters ==
Yū Azuma (東ゆう, Azuma Yū)
Voiced by: Asaki Yuikawa
Kurumi Taiga (大河くるみ, Taiga Kurumi)
Voiced by: Hina Yōmiya
Ranko Katori (華鳥蘭子, Katori Ranko)
Voiced by: Reina Ueda
Mika Kamei (亀井美嘉, Kamei Mika)
Voiced by: Haruka Aikawa
Shinji Kudō (工藤真司, Kudō Shinji)
Voiced by: Shōya Kimata (JO1)
Moka Koga (古賀萌香, Koga Moka)
Voiced by: Yurika Kubo
Sachi Mizuno (水野サチ, Mizuno Sachi)
Voiced by: Hina Kino
Shūichi Itami (伊丹秀一, Itami Shūichi)
Voiced by: Teruyoshi Uchimura

== Media ==
=== Novel ===
Written by then-Nogizaka46 member Kazumi Takayama, Trapezium was initially serialized in Kadokawa Shoten's Da Vinci magazine from April 6, 2016, to August 6, 2018. It was later published in print on November 28, 2018, with the cover art illustrated by Tae.

In March 2026, Seven Seas Entertainment announced that they had licensed the novel for English publication in November later in the year.

No.	Release date	ISBN
1	November 28, 2018	978-4-04-068696-7
Chapter 1: "Minami no Hoshi: Tate Roll no Onna" (南の星 〜縦ロールの女〜); Chapter 2: "Nishi no Hoshi: Moesode no Onna" (西の星 〜萌え袖の女〜); Chapter 3: "Higashi no Hoshi: Kagayakitai Onna" (東の星 〜輝きたい女〜); Chapter 4: "Kita no Hoshi: Zen o Nasu Onna" (北の星 〜善を為す女〜); Chapter 5: "Onaji Hoshi: Kuruma Isu no Shōjo" (同じ星 〜車イスの少女〜); Chapter 6: "Kyōbōsha: Rakudairo Cameraman" (共謀者 〜ラクダ色カメラマン〜); Chapter 7: "Kōtekishu: Multilingual Rōjin" (好敵手 〜マルチリンガル老人〜); Chapter 8: "Sukuinushi: Doku Kinoko AD" (救い主 〜毒キノコAD〜); Chapter 9: "Hōi Jishin" (方位自身); Epilogue

=== Anime film ===
An anime film adaptation was announced on December 12, 2023. The film is produced by CloverWorks, directed by Masahiro Shinohara, and supervised by Koji Masunari, with scripts written by Yūko Kakihara, character designs by Rio, and music composed by Masaru Yokoyama. It was released in Japan on May 10, 2024. The film's theme song, "Wannabe" (なんもない, Nanmonai), is produced by Maisondes and performed by Hoshimachi Suisei, while the ending theme song, "Hōi Jishin," is performed by Asaki Yuikawa, Hina Yōmiya, Reina Ueda, and Haruka Aikawa.

Crunchyroll picked up the film for release in North American theaters for one day on September 18, 2024, with France and Germany following on November 19 and November 26, respectively, before adding it to their streaming service on 28 February 2025. Sugoi Co licensed the film for release in Australia from September 26, 2024.

=== Manga ===
A manga adaptation illustrated by Kina Kazuharu was announced on May 11, 2024. It ran on the KadoComi website from February 26, 2025, to March 4, 2026. A single volume was released on March 19, 2026.

No.	Release date	ISBN
1	March 19, 2026	978-40-4607264-1

== Reception ==
By 2022, the novel had over 250,000 copies in circulation.

The anime film debuted at tenth at the Japanese box office on its opening weekend.
