= Niina Hanamiya =

Japanese voice actress

- 花宮 初奈
- Born: October 24; Osaka Prefecture, Japan
- Occupation: Voice actress
- Years active: 2022-present
- Agent: Aoni Production
- Known for: Link! Like! Love Live! as Kozue Otomune; Bad Girl as Atori Mizutori

Niina Hanamiya (花宮 初奈, Hanamiya Niina; born October 24) is a Japanese voice actress from Osaka Prefecture. She is known for voicing Kozue Otomune in Link! Like! Love Live! and Atori Mizutori in Bad Girl.

== Biography ==
Hanamiya took piano lessons from a young age, inspired by her mother who was a skilled piano player. However, as she was not skilled at it, she switched to dancing ballet at the age of five. While in high school, she began practicing ikebana, following the Ohara-ryū school; she would continue this hobby even after graduation. She also took up jazz dancing, aiming to enroll at the Takarazuka Music School, as well as taking up dancing in university.

Hanamiya first became interested in becoming a voice actress after becoming a fan of the Love Live! franchise. She liked the character Eli Ayase, who was a ballet dancer like her, and wanted to become part of the series. Her first attempt was auditioning to become a member of Liella from Love Live! Superstar!!, although she did not pass. After that, she took up voice acting training lessons and auditioned for the talent agency Aoni Production. After becoming affiliated with Aoni, she auditioned for Love Live! again, this time to be part of the Hasunosora Girls' High School Idol Club project. This time she passed, ultimately being chosen as the voice actress for the character Kozue Otomune. In 2025, she played Atori Mizutori in the anime television series Bad Girl.

Hanamiya is a quarter American, as her grandfather is American. She also has a younger brother, and they are so close that they call each other every day. She has had an interest in Ancient Egypt since childhood and taught herself how to write and read Egyptian hieroglyphs. She holds a license as an ikebana instructor.

== Filmography ==
=== Anime ===
| Year | Title | Role | Notes | Ref. |
|---|---|---|---|---|
| 2025 | Bad Girl | Atori Mizutori | | |
| 2026 | Love Live! Hasunosora Girls' High School Idol Club Bloom Garden Party | Kozue Otomune | Film | |
| 2026 | The Elusive Samurai | Mima Sasaki | | |

=== Video games ===
| Year | Title | Role | Notes | Ref. |
|---|---|---|---|---|
| 2023 | Link! Like! Love Live! | Kozue Otomune | | |
| 2024 | Goddess of Victory: Nikke | Zwei | | |
| 2026 | Dead or Alive Xtreme Venus Vacation | Nozomi | | |
| 2026 | Brown Dust 2 | Nekyndalia | | |
| 2026 | BanG Dream! Our Notes | Yomogi Yakura | | |
