= Suwa Yorishige (Nanboku-chō period) =

Military commander

- Born: Unknown
- Died: August 19, 1335 (Kenmu 2)
- Children: Tokitsugu, Takashige, Takatsugu, Banzai [1]
- Relatives: Father: Suwa Morishige? / Suwa Munetsune (Naoyuki Nyudo)? / Suwa Nobushige? [
- Military career
- Era: Late Kamakura period - Nanbokucho period
- Rank: Junior Fifth Rank [2], Governor of Mikawa [1]

Suwa Yorishige was a military commander of the Suwa clan active from the late Kamakura period to the Northern and Southern Courts period. He is said to have been the chief of Suwa Taisha, though details are uncertain. There are various theories regarding his parentage.

== Life ==
During the Kamakura period, the Suwa clan served as retainers to the Hojo clan, the shugo (governor) of Shinano Province for generations. During the Tosho-ji War, Suwa Tokimitsu (Enko Nyudo) committed suicide.

After the fall of the Kamakura Shogunate, the Suwa clan clashed with Ogasawara Sadamune, who was appointed as the new shugo of Shinano by the new-established Kenmu Restoration. Due to dissatisfaction with Ogasawara's rule, Yorishige and his son Suwa Tokitsugu supported Hojo Tokiyuki, the surviving son of Regent Hojo Takatoki, and initiated the Nakasendai Rebellion. With the help of the Miura clan and others, Yorishige defeated and killed Shibukawa Yoshiki, Iwamatsu Tsuneie, Imagawa Norimitsu, and Koyama Hidetomo. They temporarily occupied Kamakura and forced Ashikaga Tadayoshi to flee, but were ultimately defeated by a punitive force led by Kiso Iemura, sent from Kyoto. Yorishige then committed suicide at Shochoju-in along with his son Tokitsugu and 43 others.

According to the genealogy in Volume 27 of the Suwa Shiryo Sosho, it is believed that the "Suwa Moritaka" who helped Hojo Tokiyuki escape from Kamakura and brought him to Shinano is the same person as Yorishige.

The headship of the Suwa family (the position of Daishugi) was passed down to his grandson, Yoritsugu (Tokitsugu's son).

== Gallery ==
A memorial tower for Lord Suwa Teruun Yorishige (Miyagawa, Chino City, Nagano Prefecture; the top of the tower shows signs of repair.)

Torii gate of Suwa Taisha Shrine (signboard on the left, memorial tower on the right after climbing up)

Suwa Shrine Front Shrine Worship Site (The memorial tower is on the left as you descend)

== Related works ==
- Matsui Yusei "The Elusive Samurai" (serialized in Weekly Shonen Jump)

== Sources ==
- "Umematsuron"
- "Taiheiki" (Volume 13, The Death of Tokiyuki in the Case of the Ashikaga Lord's Departure to the Eastern Provinces)
