= Betobeto-san =

Japanese supernatural entity

Betobeto-san (べとべとさん) is a kind of Japanese yōkai said to follow people walking at night. In Uda-gun, Nara, it is better to meet on a dark night road. In Shizuoka, it is said that one will encounter Betobeto-san when descending from a small mountain.

== Overview ==
Although it is said that Betobeto-san does not cause harm to people, if one hears footsteps, they should stop by one side of the road and say "Go ahead, Betobeto-san" (Nara Prefecture). If one says "coming" (Shizuoka Prefecture), "Please go ahead" (the same prefecture), that person will be away from the people who follow them. Manga artist Shigeru Mizuki said that he has encountered something that seems to be akin to this yōkai. The local name of Mizuki, the West Japan Railway Company (JR West) Sakai Line, Yonago Airport Station is nicknamed "Betobeto-san Station."

== Analogy ==
"Bishakutsu", which is transmitted to Sakai-gun, Fukui Prefecture (currently Sakai City), is a place where invisible objects can be seen after a human walking on a dark night road during the winter sleet. A mystery of making a walking sound is heard, and it is regarded as a monster of the same kind as the sticky person.

"Teke Teke", which is known in recent years, is almost the same as a footsteps monster.
