= Kagami Shikō =

Japanese poet

- 各務 支考
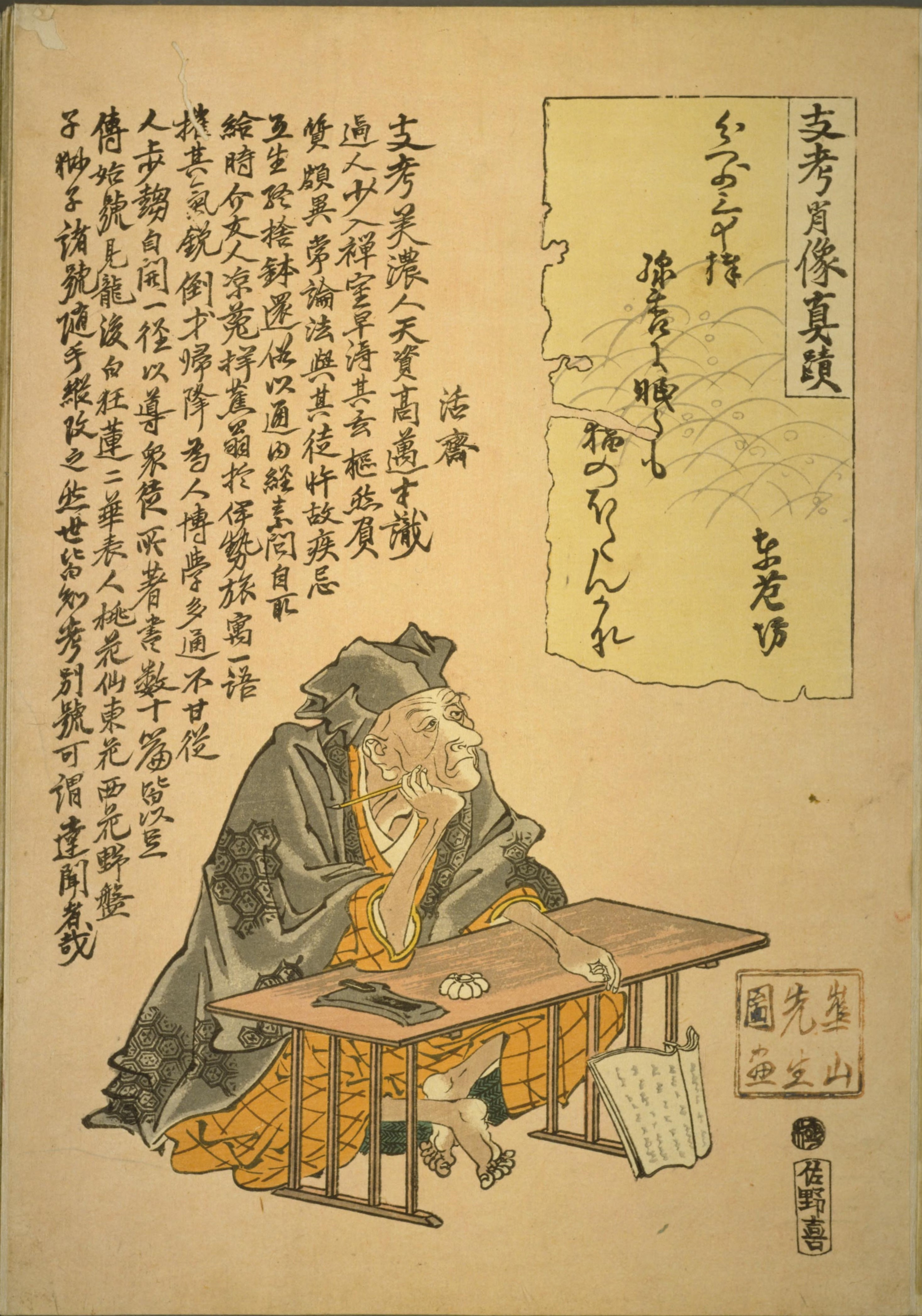
- "An authentic portrait of Shikō" (支考肖像真蹟, Shikō shōzō shinseki), by Watanabe Kazan.
- Born: 1665; Yamagata district, Mino Province
- Died: March 14, 1731 (aged 86–87); Daichi-ji Temple
- Occupation: Poet
- Writing career
- Pen name: Tōkabō 東華房; Seikabō 西華房; Shishian 獅子庵; Renjibō 蓮二房; Hakukyō 白狂
- Notable works: Kuzu no matsubara (葛の松原); Honchō bunkan (本朝文鑑) (editor)

Kagami Shikō (各務 支考; 1665 – 14 March 1731), often known by the mononym Shikō, was a Japanese haiku poet of the early Edo period, known as one of Matsuo Bashō's Ten Eminent Disciples (蕉門十鉄, Shōmon juttetsu) and the originator of the Shishimon school (or Mino school) of poetry. As of 2024, his school of poetry has remained active to the present day, having had its 41st consecutive master at its head since 2006.

== Biography ==
Shikō was born in Nishiyama, Kitano Village, Yamagata district, Mino Province (in present-day Gifu). He lost his father at a young age and entered the Daichi-ji Temple to train as a Zen Buddhist monk. Around the age of 19, however, he left the temple and returned to secular life, living in Kyōto and Iseyama. He was adopted by the Kagami family, into which his second eldest sister had married, and took their name.

Shikō met Matsuo Bashō in Ōmi in April 1690, at the age of 26, and became his disciple. Consequently, he accompanied Bashō to Edo the following year. In 1692, he travelled to Mutsu Province and published his first treatise on haiku, Kuzu no matsubara (葛の松原, Pine-Grove Kudzu). In 1694, he accompanied Bashō on his journey from Iga Province to Osaka. When Bashō came down with a stomach illness, Shikō was present at his deathbed and wrote Bashō's will.

Following his teacher's death, Shikō frequently toured around Iga, Ise, Ōmi, Edo, and elsewhere in the country, holding memorial performances in his teacher's memory. During this time, he also collected Bashō's poems and writings into the Oi nikki (笈日記, Records in a Knapsack).

In 1711, wishing to hear his own posthumous reputation, he feigned his own death. Thereafter, he posed as his own disciple, publishing under pseudonyms like Renjibō and Watanabe no Kyō (渡辺ノ狂), and established himself at a hermitage in Yamada, Ise Province. By the time that he published the Ise shin hyakuin (伊勢新百; New 100 Poems of Ise), his poetic style had become firmly established. Shikō was very active during this period: he travelled far, visiting Kyūshū, Chūgoku, Shikoku, and Hokuriku; published many haiku collections and treatises; and took on many disciples.

After 1724, he returned to his hometown in Mino, where he lived at the Shishi-an hermitage. During these final years of his life, he named Rogenbō Rikō as the successor of his school of poetry, which came to be known as the Mino School (美濃派, minoha), after his home province, or Shishimon (獅子門). Shikō died at Shishi-an in 1731, at the age of 67, having continued to write right up to his death. He was buried in the tomb he had built himself at Daichi-ji Temple. Subsequently, Rogenbō published a memorial anthology of Kagami's writings titled Bunseikan (文星観, Star-like writings).

The Shishi-an hermitage where Shikō spent his final years is designated a historic site by Gifu Prefecture.
