= Hōjō Tokiyuki =

Japanese samurai

- 北条 時行
- Born: 1329
- Died: June 21, 1353 (aged 23–24)
- Burial place: Ōshika, Shimoina, Nagano Prefecture
- Other names: 相模次郎; 中先代
- Years active: End of Kamakura period - Nanboku-chō period
- Father: Hōjō Takatoki
- Relatives: Hōjō Kunitoki
- Family: Hōjō clan (Tokusō)

Hōjō Tokiyuki (北条 時行; died 21 June 1353) was a samurai of the Hōjō clan who fought both for and against the Imperial Court. (Note: Unlike every other source consulted, for example Goble, on page 38 of his "History of Japan", British historian George Sansom states that Tokiyuki was killed on 8 September 1335, by Ashikaga forces entering Kamakura.) His father was Hōjō Takatoki, a Shogunal Regent and de facto ruler of the Kamakura shogunate.

== Biography ==
Tokiyuki had fought against both the Imperial forces and those of the Ashikaga in order to save the Kamakura shogunate, of which his clan had been the de facto ruler for over a century. After the 1333 siege of Kamakura, his father's suicide and the almost complete destruction of his family, he escaped to Shinano Province and the home of Suwa Yorishige, where he gathered an army with which to return and try to regain power. He re-entered Kamakura in 1335, forcing Ashikaga Tadayoshi to flee before he was forced to flee himself by Tadayoshi's elder brother and future shōgun Ashikaga Takauji.

Shortly after his defeat, Tokiyuki asked to be pardoned by Emperor Go-Daigo, and formally entered into the service of the Southern Court (then rival of Ashikaga shogunate and Northern Court), fighting under the command of Kitabatake Akiie, and later Prince Munenaga. He also aided in the 1352 recapture of Kamakura, led by Nitta Yoshioki. However, when routed Nitta was pursued by Ashikaga Takauji and sought refuge in Echigo Province, Tokiyuki fled to Sagami Province, where he was discovered and beheaded by forces loyal to the Ashikaga.

== In popular culture ==
Hōjō Tokiyuki is the protagonist of The Elusive Samurai, a 2021-2026 manga series and its anime adaptation. He is portrayed as a young boy who is talented in fleeing and hiding.

== See also ==
- Yokoi Yayū - The Yokoi clan is believed to descend from Tokiyuki.
- Later Hōjō clan
