= Godaiin Muneshige =

Godaiin Muneshige (Japanese: 五大院宗繁) was a samurai of the late Kamakura period. He was a vassal of Tokusō family of the Hōjō clan. The name of Muneshige appears in Taiheiki, but historical materials from that period refer to him as Takashige (Japanese: 高繁).

== Life ==
The Godaiin clan was an influential Miuchibito (retinue of the Hōjō clan) that served the Tokusō family (head family of the Hōjō clan), and had close blood relationship with them. According to Endō keizu (Japanese: 遠藤系図, lit. 'Genealogy of the Endō clan'), a daughter of Endō Tametoshi (Japanese: 遠藤為俊) married Hōjō Muneyori, who was a brother of Hōjō Tokimune, and after his death in 1279, married 'Godaiin Saemon-no-jō'. The person is thought to be either Muneshige or Takayori (Japanese: 高頼) but it is not clear. Muneshige's sister was a concubine of Hōjō Takatoki, and they had a child named Kunitoki.

According to Godaiin Uemon Muneshige Sagami-tarō o sukasu koto (Japanese: 五大院右衛門宗繁賺相摸太郎事, lit. 'An episode that Godaiin Uemon Muneshige deceived Sagami-tarō') in Taiheiki vol. 11, Muneshige was entrusted with Kunitoki by Takatoki at the time of the fall of the Kamakura shogunate during the Genkō War in May 1333. The war tale wrote that Takatoki asked him to "hide and protect Kunitoki by any means necessary, and when the time comes, rise up to soothe the bitterness of our departed souls."

However, after the fall of Kamakura, he knew that the Nitta clan had begun to hunt the remnants of the Hōjō clan and offer rewards to those who captured them. Thinking "rather than lose my own life, I would rather tell them where he is, show them that I have no intention of rebelling, and protect my territory as much as possible,” he decided to betray Kunitoki, who was his nephew and master. On the night of May 27, Muneshige persuaded Kunitoki to go to Izu without his protection and told Funada Yoshimasa where he was. Kunitoki was captured at Sagami River and executed in Kamakura on May 29.

Muneshige's disloyal behavior was condemned, and Nitta Yoshisada decided to execute him because "Godaiin Uemon's spirit, which forsakes loyalty for greed, is so rare and contrary to the ways of man that anyone who sees him will reject and despise him." When he realized this, he began to run away, but no one tried to help him, and even his old friends abandoned him. According to Taiheiki, it was rumored that he became a beggar and starved to death.

== Sources ==
- 「北條貞時十三年忌供養記」（円覚寺文書）
- 生駒孝臣 (2002). "鎌倉中・後期の摂津渡辺党遠藤氏について : 「遠藤系図」をめぐって". 人文論究. 52 (2). 西宮 : 関西学院大学人文学会. ISSN 0286-6773.
- 谷垣伊太雄 (1993). "地方と中央 : 『太平記』巻十一の構成と展開". 樟蔭国文学. 30. 大阪樟蔭女子大学.
