= The Elusive Samurai =

Japanese manga series by Yusei Matsui

- First tankōbon volume cover, featuring Hōjō Tokiyuki

逃げ上手の若君 (Nige Jōzu no Wakagimi)
- Genre: Adventure; Comedy; Historical fantasy
- Manga
- Written by: Yusei Matsui
- Published by: Shueisha
- English publisher: NA: Viz Media
- Imprint: Jump Comics
- Magazine: Weekly Shōnen Jump
- Original run: January 25, 2021 – February 16, 2026
- Volumes: 27
- Anime television series
- Directed by: Yuta Yamazaki
- Written by: Yoriko Tomita
- Music by: Gembi; Akiyuki Tateyama
- Studio: CloverWorks
- Licensed by: NA: Aniplex of America; SEA: Muse Communication
- Original network: Tokyo MX, BS11, GYT, GTV, MBS (S1); FNS (Fuji TV) (S2)
- Original run: July 6, 2024 – October 2, 2026
- Episodes: 24
- icon

The Elusive Samurai (Japanese: 逃げ上手の若君, Hepburn: Nige Jōzu no Wakagimi; 'The Young Lord Who Is Skilled at Escaping') is a Japanese manga series written and illustrated by Yusei Matsui. It was serialized in Shueisha's shōnen manga magazine Weekly Shōnen Jump from January 2021 to February 2026, with its chapters collected in 27 tankōbon volumes. The series is based on the historical figure of Hōjō Tokiyuki, the last survivor of the Hōjō clan determined to enact revenge on Ashikaga Takauji, a samurai who betrayed and caused the downfall of his family.

An anime television series adaptation produced by CloverWorks aired from July to September 2024. A second season aired from July to October 2026.

The series won the 69th Shogakukan Manga Award in 2024.

== Premise ==
Set between the late Kamakura and early Muromachi periods, the story follows the tale of Hōjō Tokiyuki, a boy on the run after his family is overthrown by Ashikaga Takauji. With his only allies being a shady priest and his followers, the young lord must seek revenge and regain his glory, with his only weapon: a superhuman ability to flee and hide.

== Media ==
=== Manga ===
Written and illustrated by Yusei Matsui, The Elusive Samurai was serialized in Shueisha's shōnen manga magazine Weekly Shōnen Jump from January 25, 2021, to February 16, 2026. Shueisha collected its chapters in 27 tankōbon volumes, released from July 2, 2021, to October 2, 2026.

In North America, the manga is licensed for English release by Viz Media, who simultaneously published the chapters digitally on its Shonen Jump website as they were released in Japan. In October 2021, Viz Media announced that it would publish the volumes in print, with the first one released on July 5, 2022. Shueisha also simulpublishes the series in English on the Manga Plus platform.

=== Anime ===
An anime television series adaptation was announced in March 2023. It is produced by CloverWorks and directed by Yuta Yamazaki, with scripts supervised by Yoriko Tomita, and character designs handled by Yasushi Nishiya. Yūsuke Kawakami serves as assistant director, and Gembi and Akiyuki Tateyama composed the music. The series aired its first season from July 6 to September 28, 2024, on Tokyo MX and other networks. The opening theme song is "Plan A" (プラン A, Puran A), performed by Dish, and the ending theme song is "Kamakura Style" (鎌倉 STYLE, Kamakura Sutairu), performed by Botchi Boromaru.

A second season was announced in October 2024. Following a re-air of the first season on the Noitamina programming block on Fuji TV and its affiliates from April 17 to July 3, 2026, the second season aired on the same block from July 17 to October 2 of the same year. The opening theme song is "Onigoto" (鬼事; 'Demon Occurrences'), performed by Kento Nakajima, and the ending theme is "Romantic ga Hoshiinara" (ロマンティックがほしいなら; lit. 'If You're Looking for Romance'), performed by Botchi Boromaru with three guest vocalists from idol group Hinatazaka46: Nao Kosaka, Yōko Shōgenji, and Kaho Fujishima.

Aniplex of America licensed the series and streamed it on Crunchyroll; an English dub premiered on August 3, 2024. Aniplex of America released the episodes on Blu-ray on August 26, 2025. Muse Communication licensed the series in Southeast Asia.

==== Series overview ====
Season	Episodes	Originally released	
Season	Episodes	First released	Last released
1	12	July 6, 2024	September 28, 2024
2	12	July 17, 2026	October 2, 2026

==== Episodes ====
===== Season 1 (2024) =====
No. overall	No. in season	Title	Directed by	Written by	Storyboarded by	Original release date
1	1	"May 22nd" Transliteration: "Gogatsu Nijū-ni Nichi" (Japanese: 5月22日)	Yuta Yamazaki	Yoriko Tomita	Yuta Yamazaki	July 6, 2024
In 1333, Hōjō Tokiyuki is the reluctant heir to the regency who partakes in mischief around Kamakura. He meets with Hōjō clan ally Ashikaga Takauji, who departs to quell a rebellion led by the Emperor's supporters. Tokiyuki is later startled at the presence of Suwa Yorishige and Shizuku, who have come to pray for Kamakura's protection against its enemies. Yorishige shares a vision of Tokiyuki being hailed as a hero of a great war, though Tokiyuki doubts his claims. An envoy reports to the shogunate of Takauji defecting to the Emperor's side. Takauji launches a coup and incites mass genocide, causing the fall of the shogunate and traumatizing Tokiyuki. Yorishige and Shizuku urge him to escape under the orders of his deceased father. As they overlook the city's remains from a cliff and Tokiyuki wishes on wanting to die, Yorishige obliges by pushing him off the cliff. Tokiyuki demonstrates his skills in speed and evasion, using them to his advantage in causing several samurai to unintentionally kill one another before returning to Yorishige. Yorishige speaks on how he can use his elusive nature for survival with Takauji hunting him and they leave to gather more allies.
2	2	"The Gentle Uncle"; Transliteration: "Yasashī Ojisan" (Japanese: やさしいおじさん)	Yūsuke Kawakami	Yoriko Tomita	Yūsuke Kawakami	July 13, 2024
A search party loyal to Takauji is dispatched to locate Tokiyuki's half-brother Kunitoki as he is found by their uncle Godaīn Muneshige, who points the party to his direction. Tokiyuki later learns of Muneshige's treachery and Kunitoki's capture and execution. He collapses in tears, feeling betrayed by everyone he knew. Wanting to avenge his half-brother, Tokiyuki follows Yorishige as they observe a desperate Muneshige wanting to claim glory by capturing him. Tokiyuki meets Yorishige's allies Kojirō and Ayako, who lend their assistance to his cause. Later that evening, Tokiyuki and Muneshige meet, where Tokiyuki springs a trap that is countered by Muneshige. Tokiyuki evades Muneshige's attacks, which Kojirō and Ayako exploit to give Tokiyuki an opening. Tokiyuki finally kills Muneshige as he recalls Kunitoki telling him to become a hero.
3	3	"A Forest Inhabited by a God"; Transliteration: "Kami no Sumu Mori" (Japanese: 神の住む森)	Riharu Funakubo	Yoriko Tomita	Riharu Funakubo	July 20, 2024
Yorishige briefs Tokiyuki after the fight on being righteous while not forgetting his roots if he comes to face Takauji in battle and defeat him as they leave Kamakura and arrive at the Grand Shrine in Suwa. Yorishige trains Tokiyuki in martial arts and academic studies, compelling an impatient Tokiyuki to skip training. Yorishige reveals himself to be a god during a rainy day and showcases his powers, leading a surprised Tokiyuki to trust Yorishige in training to become a hero. Yorishige elects Kojirō, Ayako, and Shizuku to be Tokiyuki's retinue and tasks him to become familiarized with them. Despite their eccentricity, Tokiyuki's group settles for hunting. While hunting rabbits, they encounter an ox demon and they engage it in battle, managing to kill it through teamwork. Tokiyuki is grateful for their assistance as the group settles on naming themselves the Elusive Warriors. Elsewhere, a group of archers are seen finding Yorishige.
4	4	"Sadamune Appears!"; Transliteration: "Sadamune Tōjō!" (Japanese: 貞宗登場!)	Yūichirō Komuro	Dai Hazeyama	Yūichirō Komuro	July 27, 2024
Takauji is commended for overthrowing the shogunate and restoring the Emperor's authority, allowing him to appoint his retainers in court positions. He tasks one of his retainers, Ogasawara Sadamune, to find remnants of the Hōjō clan. Sadamune complies and later meets with Yorishige, threatening to use brute force as governor of Shinano to find any survivors. He shoots and grazes a shrine maiden's ear as a warning; Tokiyuki quietly commends his archery skills while acknowledging him as a threat. Sadamune joins a dog shooting competition, leading Yorishige to elect Tokiyuki as his opponent while teaching him to use it as an opportunity to learn from Sadamune, much to the disapproval of the Elusive Warriors. During the competition, Tokiyuki, using a false name and following Yorishige's instructions, directs Sadamune's full attention to him and annoys him enough for Tokiyuki to score a point. Sadamune, noticing he used up most of his arrows to try and hit Tokiyuki, uses his last remaining arrow to land a headshot on him, giving Sadamune a massive point advantage. Tokiyuki, wounded from the arrow, begins to have fun.
5	5	"Settling the Score! A Dog-Shooting Competition and then..." Transliteration: "Ketchaku! Inuōmono, Soshite..." (Japanese: 決着!犬追物、そして⋯)	Ayako Kurata	Rino Yamasaki	Ayako Kurata	August 3, 2024
As Sadamune focuses his attention on Tokiyuki's blind spot to hinder his attempts on landing a shot, Tokiyuki exploits it through directly shooting at his neck, staggering Sadamune long enough for Tokiyuki to secure a win; Yorishige commands Sadamune to leave Suwa. Sadamune retaliates by planning to confiscate parts of Suwa under an Imperial Command, causing panic among its citizens. Yorishige tells Tokiyuki to steal the Command by collaborating with a thief named Kazama Genba. Following Yorishige's request, the Elusive Warriors head to a village Genba is rumored to be staying, where Genba introduces himself and works with Tokiyuki based on the promises of earning more under him. Genba and Tokiyuki sneak into Sadamune's mansion to steal the Command as Genba takes issue with Tokiyuki's compassion for people. Tokiyuki later sees Genba impersonating Sadamune to lure out the guards from the warehouse housing the Command and Genba asks if he can be trusted with his skill.
6	6	"Steal the Imperial Command from Ogasawara's Residence at Night"; Transliteration: "Nusume Rinji, Ogasawara-kan no Yoru" (Japanese: 盗め綸旨、小笠原館の夜)	Yōko Kikuchi	Rino Yamasaki	Yōko Kikuchi	August 10, 2024
The mansion guards are alerted by the suspicious activity inside the warehouse, so Tokiyuki and Genba escape with the Command. Ichikawa Sukefusa, Sadamune's right-hand man, suspects the boys are hiding nearby and, using his hearing, attempts to find them. Genba prepares to abandon Tokiyuki, but his silent footsteps are heard by Sukefusa and he strikes him, only to be narrowly saved by Tokiyuki taking the blow. Sadamune aids Sukefusa in tracking the boys, as Tokiyuki slowly loses his strength from Sukefusa's hit. Seeing this, Genba distracts Sadamune and Sukefusa long enough to escape with the Elusive Warriors, joining them afterwards and gaining newfound respect for Tokiyuki. With the Command no longer in his ownership, Sadamune is unable to confiscate Suwa, angering him. As the Elusive Warriors celebrate, Yorishige reminds them they should not underestimate Takauji, sharing how Takauji thwarted Prince Moriyoshi's attempt on his life and charmed the citizens of Kyoto. Tokiyuki thanks Yorishige on helping him rebuild his strength and promises to not give up against Takauji.
7	7	"Children in Winter"; Transliteration: "Fuyu no Kodomotachi" (Japanese: 冬の子供たち)	Yasushi Tomoda	Yoriko Tomita	Yūichirō Komuro	August 17, 2024
New year arrives and Yorishige is distraught because it is also the time of the year when he temporarily loses his clairvoyance powers. With news that Sadamune's forces are attacking the borders of Suwa, the Elusive Warriors decide to investigate by themselves, despite Yorishige's protests. The group arrives at a village near the border where they are attacked by a teenage warrior fighting with two swords. Kojirō and Ayako fight him until he recognizes Shizuku and introduces himself as Fubuki, a wandering warrior looking for a master to serve. Tokiyuki learns that Sadamune's forces attacked the village and killed all the adults, with Fubuki and the children having killed the invaders with traps and other diversions. Tokiyuki is advised to leave the village behind, taking the children with them, but he refuses, determined to protect the children's homes and invites Fubuki to join his group. Meanwhile, Shōkan, a mercenary in the service of Sadamune who is behind the attacks, decides to invade the village with his group of bandits.
8	8	"A War of Hide and Seek"; Transliteration: "Kakurenbo Sensō" (Japanese: かくれんぼ戦争)	Yūsuke Kawakami	Dai Hazeyama	Yūsuke Kawakami	August 24, 2024
After finishing their preparations for the impending invasion, Tokiyuki asks Fubuki to teach him some swordsmanship. Fubuki teaches Tokiyuki a special fighting style that is appropriate for his elusive abilities and kind nature, but he advises that it only works in close-quarters duels. Shōkan invades the village and most of his bandits fall by the traps set by the villagers and the Elusive Warriors. Kojirō and Ayako lead Shōkan to a small house where he is locked inside with Tokiyuki, who challenges him to a duel. Tokiyuki questions his motives on attacking the village despite having already killed its adults, and Shōkan replies he takes joy in making the village's children suffer. Enraged, Tokiyuki begins the duel as the other Elusive Warriors handle Shōkan's lieutenants. Shōkan, certain that he has the advantage, attacks Tokiyuki who evades all his attacks and manages to seriously injure him, greatly surprising Shōkan.
9	9	"My Buddha"; Transliteration: "Watashi no Hotoke-sama" (Japanese: わたしの仏様)	Arifumi Imai	Dai Hazeyama	Arifumi Imai	August 31, 2024
Despite his injury, Shōkan keeps attacking Tokiyuki to no avail and collapses from blood loss, while the other Elusive Warriors kill Shōkan's lieutenants. Sadamune arrives with reinforcements and attempts to claim the village but is forced to retreat when Genba arrives bringing Yorishige and Suwa's main force with him. Sadamune rescues a critically wounded Shōkan and, recognizing his worth, awards him with an official title and lands, while forbidding his group from committing more crimes in preparation for the imminent war against Suwa. After the battle, Fubuki learns about Tokiyuki's real identity and is officially welcomed into the Elusive Warriors.
9.5	9.5	"History"; Transliteration: "Rekishi" (Japanese: 歴史)	N/A	N/A	N/A	September 7, 2024
A recap special covering events from the first nine episodes.
10	10	"A Perverted Kid and Disturbances of Holy Power"; Transliteration: "Hentai Chigo to Shinriki Sōdō" (Japanese: 変態稚児と神力騒動)	Riharu Funakubo	Yoriko Tomita	Riharu Funakubo	September 14, 2024
After securing the village, the Elusive Warriors return home and Yorishige requests Tokiyuki to make some strange errands in secret in order to restore his clairvoyance powers. The other Elusive Warriors and Yorishige's aides take note of Tokiyuki gradually getting more suspicious items and mistake him for a pervert, much to his chagrin. Finally, Yorishige asks Tokiyuki to retrieve some water from a secret holy source. As Tokiyuki doubts if divine power even exists, he meets Shizuku at the source. In the occasion, Shizuku shows him the creatures who reside in Suwa's divine territory, and Tokiyuki leaves with more questions about Yorishige and Shizuku. Meanwhile, Takauji sends his younger brother Tadayoshi to reinforce the defenses of Kamakura, with a feeling that Tokiyuki intends to reconquer it. Tadayoshi complies, but he grows concerned with Takauji's strange behavior. Tokiyuki brings the holy water for Yorishige to restore his powers, but in return, forces him to clear the misunderstanding with his servants.
11	11	"Samurais Who Are Eager to Die and an Elusive Samurai"; Transliteration: "Shinitagari to Nige Jōzu" (Japanese: 死にたがりと逃げ上手)	Yoshihiro Hiramine	Rino Yamasaki	Yoshihiro Hiramine	September 21, 2024
As the wheat harvest season begins, Shinano's provincial official Kiyohara Shinano-no-kami confiscates all the grains production from the villagers, killing anyone who oppose him. In response, Hoshina Yasaburō leads a revolt against Kiyohara in Kawanakajima, despite his force's low chances of survival. Yorishige sends Tokiyuki, Kojirō, Genba and Fubuki as messengers to convince a stubborn Yasaburō to retreat. Certain that Yasaburō would be easier to convince after the initial skirmish with Kiyohara's forces, led by Wada Yonemaru and Sukefusa, the Elusive Warriors assist Yasaburō's forces in battle, reducing casualties to a minimum. At night, a drunk Tokiyuki has a heated discussion with Yasaburō and finally convinces him to retreat with the women and children. Yasaburō's retreat plans are intercepted by Sukefusa's hearing and Kiyohara gives orders to eliminate them. Anticipating this, the Elusive Warriors begin their strategy to allow Yasaburō and his retainers to retreat.
12	12	"Hang in There, Tokiyuki, Until the Day You Retake Kamakura"; Transliteration: "Ganbare Tokiyuki, Kamakura Dakkan no Sono Hi Made" (Japanese: がんばれ時行、鎌倉奪還のその日まで)	Yui Midori	Rino Yamasaki	Yuta Yamazaki	September 28, 2024
With the Elusive Warriors' help, Yasaburō's forces successfully allow the women and children to escape to safety while containing the enemy advance headed by Yonemaru. Kojirō struggles on fighting Yonemaru and his detachment alone, but a few Hoshina allies kill his guards, allowing Kojirō to land the final blow and kill Yonemaru. In response, Kiyohara ignores Sukefusa's pleas and sends him to the frontlines. Fubuki attacks Kiyohara from a blind spot and narrowly cuts his hat off as a warning, certain that having such an incompetent commander on the enemy side will give an advantage in the future; a frightened Kiyohara is deceived into believing Yasaburō's reinforcements are arriving and orders his army to retreat, frustrating Sukefusa. Yasaburō thanks Tokiyuki and the Elusive Warriors, and the group returns to Suwa where they are welcomed by Yorishige, Shizuku and Ayako.

===== Season 2 (2026) =====
No. overall	No. in season	Title	Directed by	Written by	Storyboarded by	Original release date
13	1	"Longing for Sea Bream!"; Transliteration: "Mōichido, Tabe Tai!" (Japanese: もう一度、食べタイ！)	Yuta Yamazaki	Yoriko Tomita	Yuta Yamazaki	July 17, 2026
Tokiyuki admits to the Elusive Warriors on missing Kamakura, especially its delicacy of seabream. Hearing this, the Elusive Warriors infiltrate enemy territory to catch seabreams. Tokiyuki eats the seabream dish and wistfully reminisces on his past. He learns from Yorishige that the fishing trip was also a reconnaissance mission to Kamakura, with Shizuku sharing it has become a stronghold led by Tadayoshi and another group of young warriors named the Kanto Hisashiban. Tokiyuki voices eagerness on retaking his home. As this is happening, Tadayoshi and the Hisashiban proclaim they will defend Kamakura while killing several attacking Hōjō loyalists. Dissatisfaction towards the Emperor's leadership also prompts a group led by Ashikaga ally Kō no Moronao to draft plans for a new government. Takauji meets with the imprisoned Moriyoshi, who realizes that Takauji restored the Emperor's authority to usurp him later on and be seen as a reformer. Takauji assures his loyalty to the Emperor but cryptically remarks that a great war will break out. Meanwhile, Sadamune and Sukefusa begin to suspect Tokiyuki's ties to the Hōjō clan and ask for his presence.
14	2	"Ayako's Heart-Pounding Operation!"; Transliteration: "Ayako no Dokidoki dai Sakusen!" (Japanese: 亜也子のドキドキ♥大作戦！)	Yūsuke Kawakami	Dai Hazeyama	Yūsuke Kawakami	July 24, 2026
Sadamune's messenger Shinzaburo requests Tokiyuki to their mansion under the guise of delivering gifts. Sensing the ploy, Ayako trains herself and joins Tokiyuki to emulate her idol Tomoe Gozen. Yorishige also teaches him how to handle an interrogation. Tokiyuki and Ayako travel to Sadamune's mansion, where Sadamune begins probing him for proof. Tokiyuki maintains a cover story of being raised in Suwa and insists the Elusive Warriors have come to respect him, even as Sadamune and Shinzaburo dispute his claims. Sadamune and Sukefusa bluntly ask him on his Hōjō lineage when Ayako holds a musical performance as a distraction. Tokiyuki is left in awe by Ayako's talent and beauty, forcing an irate Sadamune to allow them to leave before promising to kill him in battle. A humiliated Shinzaburo attempts to ambush them on the way back to Suwa, though Ayako easily defeats him with her raw strength. Ayako then declares she will continue serving Tokiyuki and become his wife in the future, baffling Tokiyuki.
15	3	"Tokiyuki and Three Great Generals"; Transliteration: "Tokiyuki to San Taishō" (Japanese: 時行と三大将)	Yūichirō Komuro	Rino Yamasaki	Yūichirō Komuro	July 31, 2026
One year later, Tokiyuki learns that the surviving Hōjō loyalists have joined Yorishige's army. Yorishige also relays Kiyohara's plans to invade Suwa, so he brings in the generals Nezu Yorinao, Mochizuki Shigenobu, and Unno Yukiyasu. The generals pledge their allegiance to Tokiyuki, while Kiyohara grows confident in crushing the rebellion. Yorishige tasks the Elusive Warriors to act as runners for Suwa's rebel army, and they travel to Yukiyasu's camp to observe the situation. Yukiyasu orders them to deliver a message of maintaining pressure on Kiyohara's armies, emphasizing the importance of communications to gain the upper hand. The Elusive Warriors evade Sadamune's troops to relay the message to Yorinao's camp. After Yorinao notes that Shigenobu's camp may not hold out for long, Tokiyuki volunteers to reinforce him with Kojirō, Fubuki, and Ayako, who is Shigenobu's daughter. Yorinao also tells a conflicted Kojirō to bring honor to their clan, as the Elusive Warriors discover that Sukefusa has destroyed the camp.
16	4	"The Warrior of Love: Shinano Mask!"; Transliteration: "Ai no Senshi! Shinano Kamen" (Japanese: 愛の戦士！信濃仮面)	Asahi Kiyuna	Rino Yamasaki	Asahi Kiyuna	August 7, 2026
The Elusive Warriors learn to their relief that Shigenobu's force survived and switched to guerrilla warfare to harass Sukefusa's troops. Knowing that Sukefusa aims to rendezvous with Kiyohara's main army, the Elusive Warriors inform Yorinao of Shigenobu and Ayako halting Sukefusa's advance. Shizuku suggests that Yorinao screen Sadamune to allow Yukiyasu's better-armed force to join Yasaburō and Shinomiya in dealing with Kiyohara. Tokiyuki helps Yorinao in covertly moving his forces into position, as Yukiyasu voices that Sadamune may be planning something. Tokiyuki, Kojirō, and Genba are then cornered by Sadamune, who orders his force to kill them. Yorishige intervenes as the Shinano Mask, forcing Sadamune to retreat and shore up Kiyohara's army. Yorishige asks Tokiyuki to return home and rest, but Tokiyuki insists on staying in the fight, which Yorishige honors. The Elusive Warriors grow hopeful on winning the rebellion when Kiyohara, sealing himself inside a mikoshi, begins his counterattack.
17	5	"The Unyielding"; Transliteration: "Makezaru Monotachi" (Japanese: 負けざる者たち)	Ai Sunadokei	Yoriko Tomita	Yuta Yamazaki	August 14, 2026
Fearing that their forces will be encircled by Kiyohara, Fubuki assists in the battle. Kiyohara revels in the battle swinging in his favor, recalling how the Emperor appointed him based on his merit despite his lower nobility. However, Fubuki, Yasaburō, and Shinomiya tire out the mikoshi bearers to defeat Kiyohara. Tokiyuki observes the battle as he realizes too late that Sadamune and Shōkan have ambushed the main army. Shōkan mocks Tokiyuki's shortsightedness in military strategy, causing Tokiyuki to reevaluate his weaknesses. Shigenobu and Ayako organize a fighting retreat for Shinomiya and Yasaburō's troops. Shigenobu reveals to Tokiyuki that Yorishige has accounted for several contingency plans in the possibility of defeat and reaffirms his support. In the battle's aftermath, the Suwa rebels devote themselves to continue fighting, while Kiyohara, who escaped, returns to the corpse-strewn battlefield and laments his circumstances. Although dismayed by their defeat, Tokiyuki continues to work with Yorishige in achieving their goal, as the Elusive Warriors spot him taking a hot spring bath to their annoyance.
18	6	"The Boy Who Became A God"; Transliteration: "Kami ni Natta Shōnen" (Japanese: 神になった少年)	Chengrui Qiu	Dai Hazeyama	Chengrui Qiu	August 21, 2026
Yorishige insinuates that Tokiyuki brings good luck to Suwa due to his long hair. Tokiyuki looks back on Yorishige's care when he meets his son Tokitsugu and grandson Yoritsugu, the latter taking offense at Tokiyuki's popularity. Yorishige reveals he has passed his duties as a god to Yoritsugu while pampering Tokiyuki. Yoritsugu challenges him to a showdown. Tokiyuki worries that Yoritsugu's haughtiness may make him unfit for the role, so Yorishige and Tokitsugu suggest on befriending him. Yoritsugu states they will be playing a game of tag while hindering Tokiyuki's progress with his supporters. However, Tokiyuki easily dodges them. Yoritsugu refuses to concede defeat until he runs off a cliff. Tokiyuki uses his long hair to save him, despite Yoritsugu's concerns that damaging his hair may make Tokiyuki lose his purity. Yoritsugu voices sadness at Yorishige spending less time with him, so Tokiyuki arranges for the two to bond. Elsewhere, Tokiyuki's uncle Yasuie delightfully wonders on his nephew's wellbeing en route to Suwa.
19	7	"My Uncle"; Transliteration: "Boku no Ojisan" (Japanese: ぼくのおじさん)	Yoshihiro Hiramine	Rino Yamasaki	Yoshihiro Hiramine	August 28, 2026
Tokiyuki and Yasuie gleefully reunite, as Yorishige reveals that Yasuie asked him to nurture Tokiyuki's growth following their escape. Genba internally questions his devotion to Tokiyuki's cause when he is ensnared by a shinobi, who mocks his lack of skills and devotion before leaving. Genba warns Yorishige of their predicament, adding that the shinobi, who disguise themselves as Tengu, ally themselves with Takauji and were instrumental in Kamakura's downfall. Fearing the shinobi may jeopardize the rebellion's plans and Tokiyuki's safety, Yorishige urges Tokiyuki and the Elusive Warriors to move to Kyoto with Yasuie. Yorishige sets fire to his residence to distract the shinobi and allow the Elusive Warriors and Yasuie to covertly escape, with Yorishige praying for Tokiyuki to grow into a seasoned warrior. While lying low at a town, Genba confides in Fubuki on his insecurities towards his skills. Fubuki states he should develop deadlier techniques beyond his theatrical tricks to incite fear among their enemies. Yasuie and the Elusive Warriors infiltrate Kyoto posing as impoverished samurai, motivating Genba to develop his reputation as a deadly trickster.
20	8	"Irreplaceable"; Transliteration: "Kakegae ga Naimono" (Japanese: かけがえがないもの)	Yūsuke Kawakami	Dai Hazeyama	Yūsuke Kawakami	September 4, 2026
Arriving in Kyoto, Yasuie conducts talks with ally Saionji Kinmune. The Elusive Warriors decide to explore the city. They later find Genba becoming embroiled in a gambling dispute with a girl named Sasaki Mima. Upon hearing that Genba will be sent into forced labor for losing to Mima at a game of sugoroku, Shizuku gambles to rescue him. Shizuku suspects Mima has divine powers, as Mima uses them to rig the game in her favor and derail Shizuku's mindset. Shizuku lulls Tokiyuki to sleep before revealing her devotion to him and passionately kissing him, flustering Mima. This causes Mima to lose her advantage, allowing Shizuku to subtly cheat her way to victory. The Elusive Warriors celebrate, as Tokiyuki wakes up and Shizuku insists on not harboring feelings for him. An impressed Mima tours them around Kyoto, learning more about Tokiyuki's background. Mima agitates a drunken samurai, prompting Tokiyuki and the Elusive Warriors to protect her. Mima sees Tokiyuki's bravery and falls in love with him. Elsewhere, Takauji grants Kiyohara divine powers, with his counselor and Mima's father Dōyo watching.
21	9	"The Man Called Masashige Kusunoki"; Transliteration: "Sono Otoko, Kusunoki Masashige" (Japanese: その男、楠木正成)	Yōsuke Yamamoto	Rino Yamasaki	Yūsuke Kawakami	September 11, 2026
The girls discuss what they like about Tokiyuki, as Fubuki tells him to remain wary of Mima due to her father being a traitor to Kamakura. After parting ways with Mima, the Elusive Warriors learn from Yasuie of their plan to lure the Emperor to Kinmune's villa and assassinate him to begin their rebellion. Remembering that Yorishige predicted it would fail, the group prepares a backup plan to safely escape back to Kamakura with Yasuie. They encounter a suspicious man while surveying escape routes, and Tokiyuki deduces his similar elusive nature. The man introduces himself as Kusunoki Masashige, an acclaimed general loyal to the Emperor. Tokiyuki asks for Masashige's guidance, despite the group's fears of Masashige recognizing him as a Hōjō. Masashige advises Tokiyuki to think beyond traditional fighting tactics and use his skills in evasion confidently. Masashige also gives a document detailing his strategies during Kamakura's downfall for him to study. Tokiyuki thanks him and rejoins the Elusive Warriors, during which they hear Takauji's planned visit to Masashige's residence. Fubuki proposes on ambushing and killing Takauji, discomforting Tokiyuki.
22	10	"The Night of the Assassination"; Transliteration: "Ansatsu no Yoru" (Japanese: 暗殺の夜)	Yūichirō Komuro	Yoriko Tomita	Yūichirō Komuro	September 18, 2026
In a flashback, a young Tokiyuki innocently promises to Takauji they will chase each other to the depths of hell. In the present, Fubuki shares his plan on synchronizing Takauji's killing with the Emperor's assassination. Tokiyuki, who remains puzzled at Takauji's decision to betray Kamakura, goes along with the plan. The Elusive Warriors separate Takauji from his entourage on the night of his visit, but Takauji sees through the deception. Tokiyuki is stunned to see that Takauji no longer recognizes him. Takauji admits he betrayed and led the destruction of Kamakura without reason, leaving an infuriated Tokiyuki to conclude that Takauji is a monster who is unaware of his own evil. Takauji easily overpowers the Elusive Warriors, though they narrowly escape after Masashige fetches Takauji. The Emperor's assassination attempt also ends in failure, prompting Shizuku and Ayako to escort Yasuie to safety as Kinmune is arrested. Tokiyuki tearfully exchanges farewells with Mima before fleeing Kyoto and vowing to become stronger.
23	11	"My Buddha, Part Two"; Transliteration: "Zoku Watashi no Hotoke-sama" (Japanese: 続わたしの仏様)	Keiko Oyamada	Yoriko Tomita	Yoshihiro Hiramine	September 25, 2026
The attempted assassinations alert much of Kyoto's nobility and military, which Yorishige exploits to begin preparations for retaking Kamakura. Tokiyuki suggests on taking the path defended by Takauji and Nitta Yoshisada's forces, noting they can influence disillusioned soldiers to their side. Yorishige tells him to defeat Shōkan in battle before they march on Kamakura. Tokiyuki inspects his own army consisting of Hōjō loyalists, though they are skeptical of his leadership while also being unaware of Tokiyuki's true identity. The Elusive Warriors train with Tokiyuki to prove his skills, as he also studies Masashige's writings for additional information. Meanwhile, at Shōkan's camp, Shōkan reminds his bandits of their service to Sadamune and to not return to thievery. Shōkan is haunted by his past actions but maintains composure in aiming to kill Tokiyuki.
24	12	"The Age"; Transliteration: "Jidai" (Japanese: 時代)	Yuta Yamazaki	Yoriko Tomita & Yuta Yamazaki	Yuta Yamazaki, Yoshihiro Hiramine, & Yūsuke Kawakami	October 2, 2026
With great upheaval on the horizon, both sides prepare for battle. Tokiyuki's force remains unconvinced of his leadership, so Tokiyuki aspires to win in combat to motivate them. After he dons lighter armor that takes advantage of his evasion, Yorishige receives a premonition of Tokiyuki's generation heralding a new age as well as Tokiyuki becoming married to Shizuku, Ayako, and Mima, leaving him overwhelmed with shock. Tokiyuki asks him on their fortunes beyond Kamakura, though Yorishige assures he will become a hero on his own merits, allowing Tokiyuki to reflect on Yorishige becoming his foster father. The rebellion begins in earnest, where Shōkan and his bandits foresee Yorishige baiting Sadamune to a vulnerable position to attack him. Shōkan intercepts him, only to witness Tokiyuki and his troops riding down a cliff on holy pillars. Tokiyuki gleefully begins his rematch with Shōkan, as the entire country becomes embroiled in the expanding war.

== Reception ==
By May 2022, the manga had over 1 million copies in circulation; over 1.5 million copies in circulation by April 2023; over 2 million copies in circulation by March 2024; over 3 million copies in circulation by July 2024; and over 6 million copies in circulation by July 2026.

In June 2021, The Elusive Samurai was nominated for the seventh Next Manga Award in the Best Printed Manga category and placed sixth out of 50 nominees. The series ranked eighth on the Nationwide Bookstore Employees' Recommended Comics of 2022. Along with Frieren: Beyond Journey's End, Sūji de Asobo, and Trillion Game, The Elusive Samurai won the 69th Shogakukan Manga Award in 2024. (Note: Since 2023, the nominees are not divided into categories.)

Anthony Gramuglia of Comic Book Resources wrote that the series has become one of the "highlights of [Weekly] Shōnen Jump's newer titles", adding that "[it] is not only surprisingly emotional but also surprisingly intense, starting with all cylinders at full-throttle and never letting up".

At the 9th Crunchyroll Anime Awards in 2025, Hōjō Tokiyuki was nominated for "Must Protect at All Costs" Character while the ending theme, "Kamakura Style" by Botchi Boromaru, was one of the nominees for Best Ending Sequence.
