= Hōjō Takatoki =

Tokusō and ruling Shikken (regent) of Japan's Kamakura shogunate (1304–1333)

Hōjō Takatoki 北条 高時
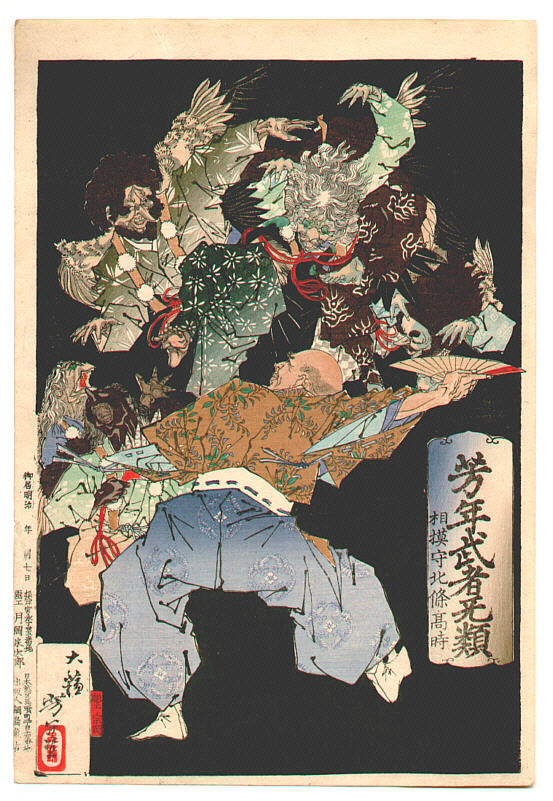
- Hōjō Takatoki fighting with a group of tengu, as depicted in a print by Yoshitoshi

Shikken
- In office 1316–1326
- Monarchs: Hanazono; Go-Daigo
- Shōgun: Prince Morikuni
- Rensho: Hōjō Sadaaki
- Preceded by: Hōjō Mototoki
- Succeeded by: Hōjō Sadaaki

Personal details
- Born: 9 January 1304
- Died: 4 July 1333 (aged 29)
- Spouse: daughter of Adachi Tokiaki
- Children: Hōjō Kunitoki; Hōjō Tokiyuki
- Parents: Hōjō Sadatoki (father); Kakukai Enjō (mother)

Hōjō Takatoki (北条 高時; 9 January 1304 – 4 July 1333) was the last Tokusō and ruling Shikken (regent) of Japan's Kamakura shogunate; the rulers that followed were his puppets. A member of the Hōjō clan, he was the son of Hōjō Sadatoki, and was preceded as shikken by Hōjō Mototoki.

== Biography ==
Takatoki became regent at the age of eight, and thus actual power was held for a time by Adachi Tokiaki of Adachi clan, his grandmother, and Nagasaki Takasuke of Nagasaki clan, a minister and retainer of Hōjō assigned to him by his father Sadatoki. Takatoki fell ill in 1326, at the age of twenty-three, some time after having taken power himself; the shogunate was under attack at this time, and would fall within a few years. Takatoki retired and became a Buddhist monk, though he still held some influence at shogunate. That same year, the shogunal government asked Emperor Go-Daigo to abdicate in favor of his successor, in order to continue the tradition of cloistered rule and the alternation of branches of the Imperial family within the line of succession; Go-Daigo chose to maintain rule, and the ensuing controversy would lead to the Nanboku-chō Wars in which agents of the two Imperial branch families would come to outright war.

George Sansom thus describes this move on the part of the shogunate a "fatal blunder" and describes Takatoki as "scarcely sane. His judgement was poor, his conduct erratic. He indulged in extremes of luxury and debauch". Upon retirement, he handed over his duties to "certain unworthy deputies". In 1331, as events began to come to a boil, Takatoki argued with his advisor Nagasaki over how to react to the Burei-kō plot, in which members of the Hino clan, loyal to Go-Daigo, conspired against the shogunate. This was but one of many events leading up to the outbreak of war, and the conflicts within the shogunal administration, between Takatoki and others, meant slow reactions and inadequate handling of such situations. Ashikaga Takauji would soon be placed in command of the shogunate's armies, to be mobilized against Go-Daigo's supporters; strongly supported by Takatoki, while this support and trust was misplaced, for Takauji would soon use these same armies against Kamakura, tearing down the Minamoto/Hōjō government and establishing his own Ashikaga shogunate.

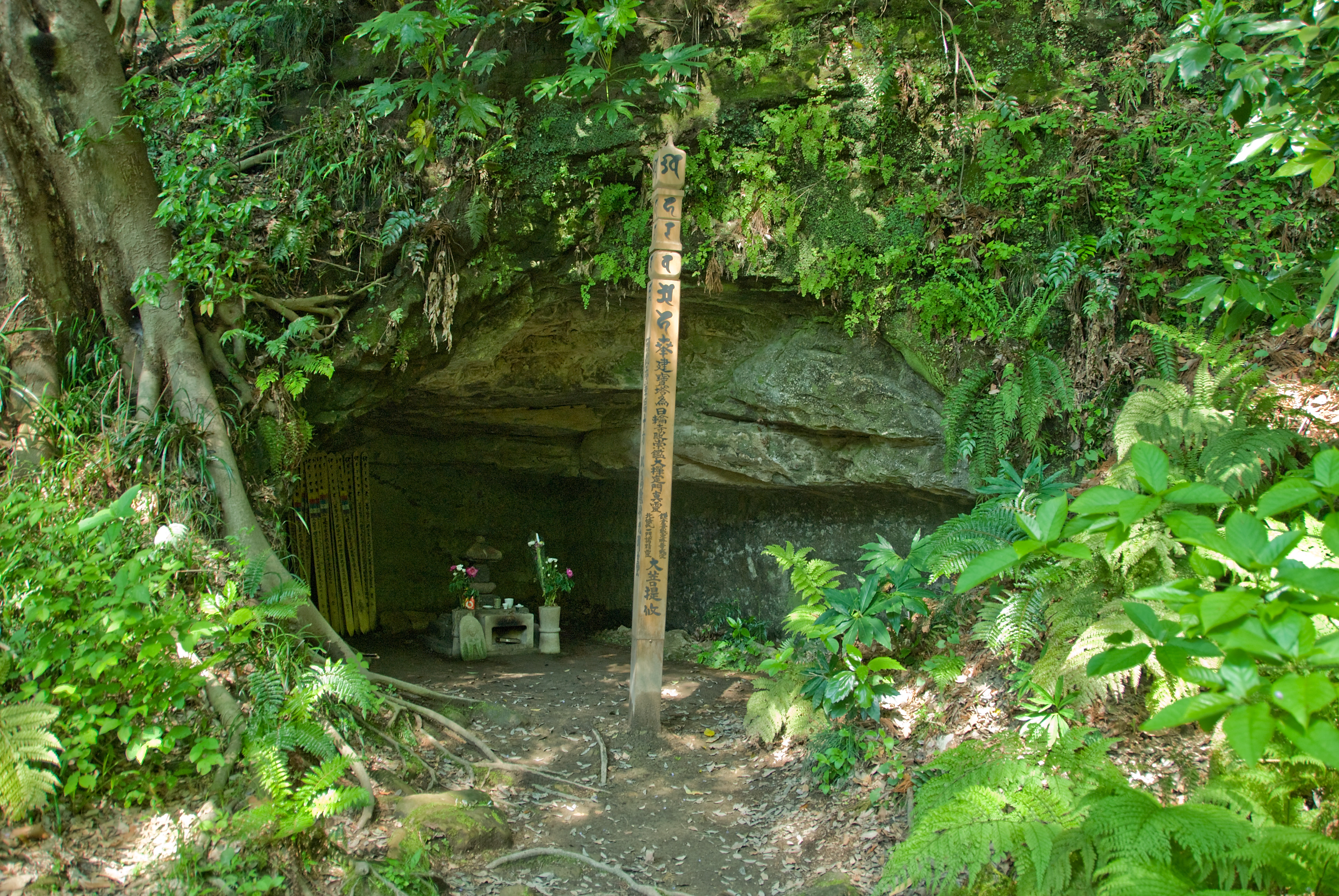
Site of Hōjō Takatoki's death

Takatoki committed suicide alongside his family during the 1333 Siege of Kamakura, one of the most dramatic events of that war, when forces of Nitta Yoshisada set fire to Kamakura, putting an end to the Kamakura shogunate. His oldest son, Hojo Kunitoki was killed in Siege of Kamakura and his second son Hojo Tokiyuki was the last son of Hojo Clan. Takatoki's brother Hojo Yasuie helped Hojo Tokiyuki after his father's suicide.

== In popular culture ==
- Takatoki was portrayed by Tsurutaro Kataoka in the 1991 drama "Taiheiki".
- He appears as a boy in the 2001 taiga drama "Hojō Tokimune", portrayed by Yosuke Asari.
- He appears in the manga The Elusive Samurai as a minor character.

Preceded by Hōjō Mototoki	Hōjō Regent; 1316–1326	Succeeded by Hōjō Sadaaki
Preceded by Hōjō Sadatoki	Tokusō; 1311–1333	Succeeded by (none)
