= 1379 =

1379 in various calendars
- Gregorian calendar: 1379; MCCCLXXIX
- Ab urbe condita: 2132
- Armenian calendar: 828; ԹՎ ՊԻԸ
- Assyrian calendar: 6129
- Balinese saka calendar: 1300–1301
- Bengali calendar: 785–786
- Berber calendar: 2329
- English Regnal year: 2 Ric. 2 – 3 Ric. 2
- Buddhist calendar: 1923
- Burmese calendar: 741
- Byzantine calendar: 6887–6888
- Chinese calendar: 戊午年 (Earth Horse); 4076 or 3869 — to — 己未年 (Earth Goat); 4077 or 3870
- Coptic calendar: 1095–1096
- Discordian calendar: 2545
- Ethiopian calendar: 1371–1372
- Hebrew calendar: 5139–5140
- Hindu calendars
- Vikram Samvat: 1435–1436
- Shaka Samvat: 1300–1301
- Kali Yuga: 4479–4480
- Holocene calendar: 11379
- Igbo calendar: 379–380
- Iranian calendar: 757–758
- Islamic calendar: 780–781
- Japanese calendar: Eiwa 5 / Kōryaku 1 (康暦元年)
- Javanese calendar: 1292–1293
- Julian calendar: 1379; MCCCLXXIX
- Korean calendar: 3712
- Minguo calendar: 533 before ROC 民前533年
- Nanakshahi calendar: −89
- Thai solar calendar: 1921–1922
- Tibetan calendar: ས་ཕོ་རྟ་ལོ་ (male Earth-Horse); 1505 or 1124 or 352 — to — ས་མོ་ལུག་ལོ་ (female Earth-Sheep); 1506 or 1125 or 353

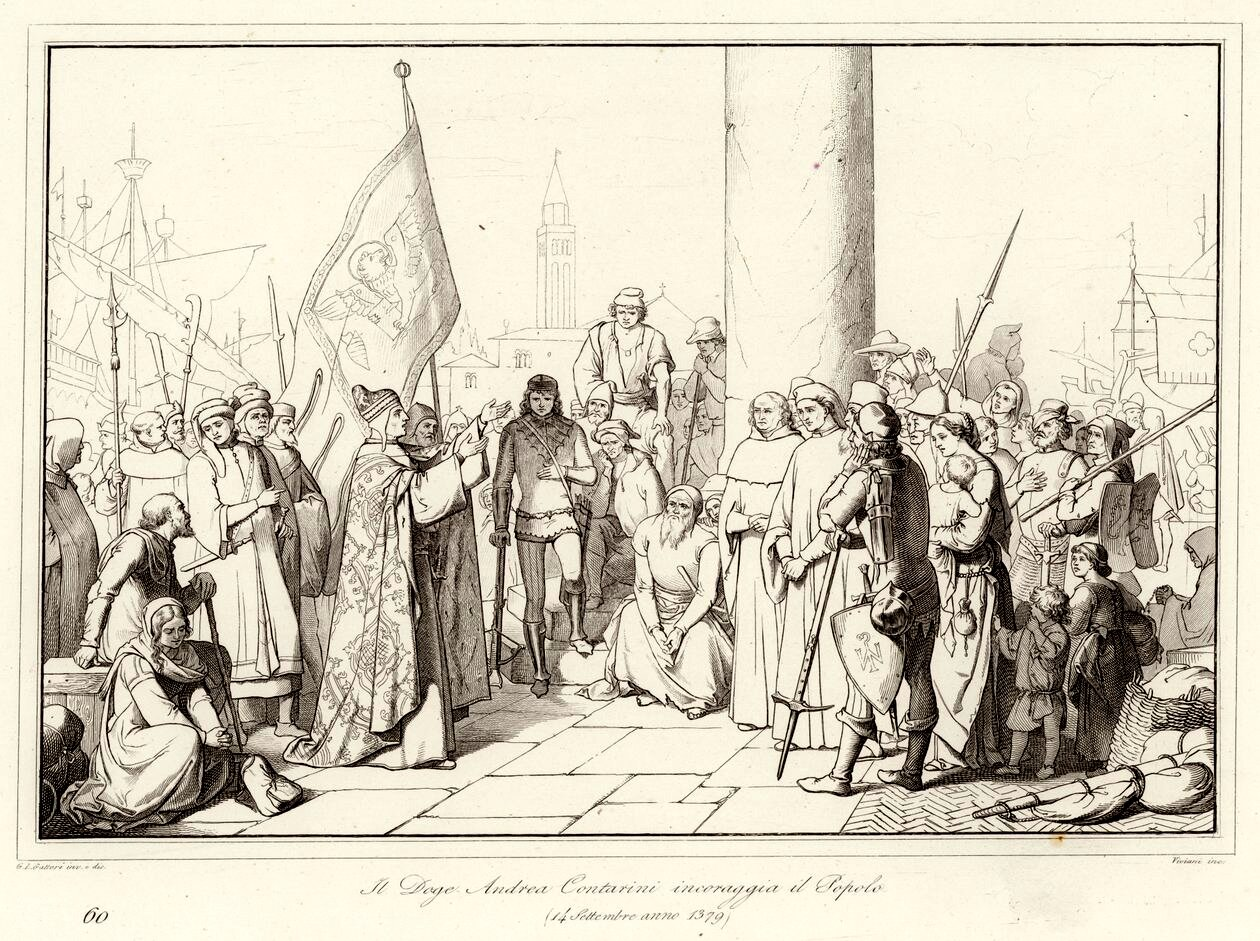
September 14: Contarini, Doge of the Republic of Venice, rallies his nation to fight Genoa.

Year 1379 (MCCCLXXIX) was a common year starting on Saturday of the Julian calendar.

== Events ==
=== January–March ===
- January 23 – Maria, Queen of Sicily since 1377, is kidnapped from her home at the Ursino Castle in Catania by Guglielmo Raimondo III of the rival House of Moncada claimants to the throne held by the House of Aragon. The action takes place with the support of King Pero IV of Aragon, who installs his son Martin of Aragon as the Viceroy of Sicily.
- February 16 – King Richard II of England issues an order directing the English Parliament to assemble on April 24 in London.
- February 18 – Heinrich III is installed as the new Duke of Mecklenburg at Schwerin (now part of Germany) upon the death of his father, Albrecht II.
- February 28 – In what is now part of Kazakhstan and Russia, Tulak Khan of Borjigin is confirmed by the Beylerbey Mamai of the Golden Horde, with the approval of the ruler Tokhtamysh, after Mamai arranges the assassination of Tulak's cousin, the former khan.
- March 24 – The First War of the Guelderian Succession ends after eight years of fighting in what is now the German state of North Rhine-Westphalia, between Wilhelm of Jülich and the Duchess Mechteld of Guelders. Duchess Mechteld, wife of John II, Count of Blois, who renounces all claims to further rule after a defeat at the Battle of Hönnepel. In return for her surrender of claims to Guelders, she receives an annual pension of 33,000 gold pieces.
- March 31 – The Treaty of Briones is signed between King Carlos of Navarre and King Enrique of Castile, ending a war that started the previous year. The Kingdom of Navarre ends its alliance with the Kingdom of England, whose troops it had allowed passage during the Hundred Years War.

=== April–June ===
- April 9 – (22nd day of third month of Eiwa 5) The Kōryaku era begins in the Northern Court of Japan at Kyoto on decree of the northern Emperor Go-En'yū because of a disastrous time of plague and war.
- April 24 – The English Parliament opens for a five-week session under the direction of King Richard II.
- May 7 – The Battle of Pola is fought in the Adriatic Sea between the navies of the Republic of Genoa and the Republic of Venice. The Venetian fleet, commanded by Admiral Vettor Pisani loses 19 of its 25 galleys in the battle, but Genoese Admiral Luciano Doria is killed in the battle. One of Doria's lieutenants conceals the admiral's death from the rest of the sailors by donning the admiral's clothes. Admiral Pisani is put in prison upon his return to Venice, but later released when Genoa invades in the Battle of Chioggia.
- May 27 – The English Parliament closes after a short session, and King Richard II issues royal assent to legislation passed, including the Riots Act 1379, a prohibition against "fraudulent deeds made by debtors to avoid their creditors", and a confirmation of liberties of the Church.
- May 29 – John I succeeds his father, Henry II, as King of Castile and King of León.
- June 30 – New College, Oxford, is founded in England by William of Wykeham, Bishop of Winchester.

=== July–September ===
- July 1 – Forces of the Republic of Venice and Ottoman Turks, having invaded Constantinople, restore John V Palaiologos as Byzantine co-emperor. Andronikos IV Palaiologos is allowed to remain as co-emperor, but is confined to the city of Silivri for the remainder of his life.
- August 16 – The Republic of Genoa, led by the Doge Nicolò Guarco and its allies from Hungary and Padua, captures Venice's port of Chioggia and seize the Venetian Army garrison there and soon threaten to take Venice and the Venetian Republic. An attempt by the Venetian Senate to apply for peace is rejected as Genoa demands a full surrender, and the Venetians resolve to fight, releasing Admiral Pisani from prison.
- September 9 – The Treaty of Neuberg is signed, splitting the Austrian Habsburg lands between brothers Albert III and Leopold III. Albert III retains the title of Duke of Austria.
- September 14 – Andrea Contarini, Doge of Venice, announces to the besieged Venetians that the Republic will fight Genoa rather than surrender their nation.

=== October–December ===
- October 20 – King Richard II issues a summons directing the English Parliament to assemble on January 16.
- November 28 – From Avignon in France, the antipope Clement VII issues his own a papal bull confirming the foundation of the University of Perpignan.
- December 22 – Andrea Contarini, the Doge of the Republic of Venice, directs Admiral Pisani to blockade the port of Genoa, effectively trapping the Genoese fleet and preventing the occupation of Venice.

=== Date unknown ===
- Bairam Khawaja establishes the independent principality of the Kara Koyunlu (Turkomans of the Black Sheep Empire), in modern-day Armenia.
- Dmitry Donskoy of Moscow raids Estonia.
- In the Hundred Years' War, the French lose control of most of Brittany to the English.
- Wisbech Grammar School is founded in England.
- Timur conquers the Sufid Dynasty of Khwarazm.

== Births ==
- October 4 – King Henry III of Castile (d. 1406)
- date unknown
  - Jerome of Prague, Hussite (d. 1416)
  - Empress Zhang (Hongxi) of China (d. 1442)

== Deaths ==
- February 18 – Albert II of Mecklenburg (b. c. 1318)
- May 29 – King Henry II of Castile (b. 1333)
- November 15 – Otto V, Duke of Bavaria (b. 1346)
- December 16 – John Fitzalan, Marshal of England (drowned)
- date unknown – Aqsara'i, Persian physician
