= Zentsū-ji =

Buddhist temple in Kagawa Prefecture, Japan

Coordinates: 34°13′30.4″N 133°46′26.9″E

Byōbuura Gogakusan Tanjō-in Zentsū-ji
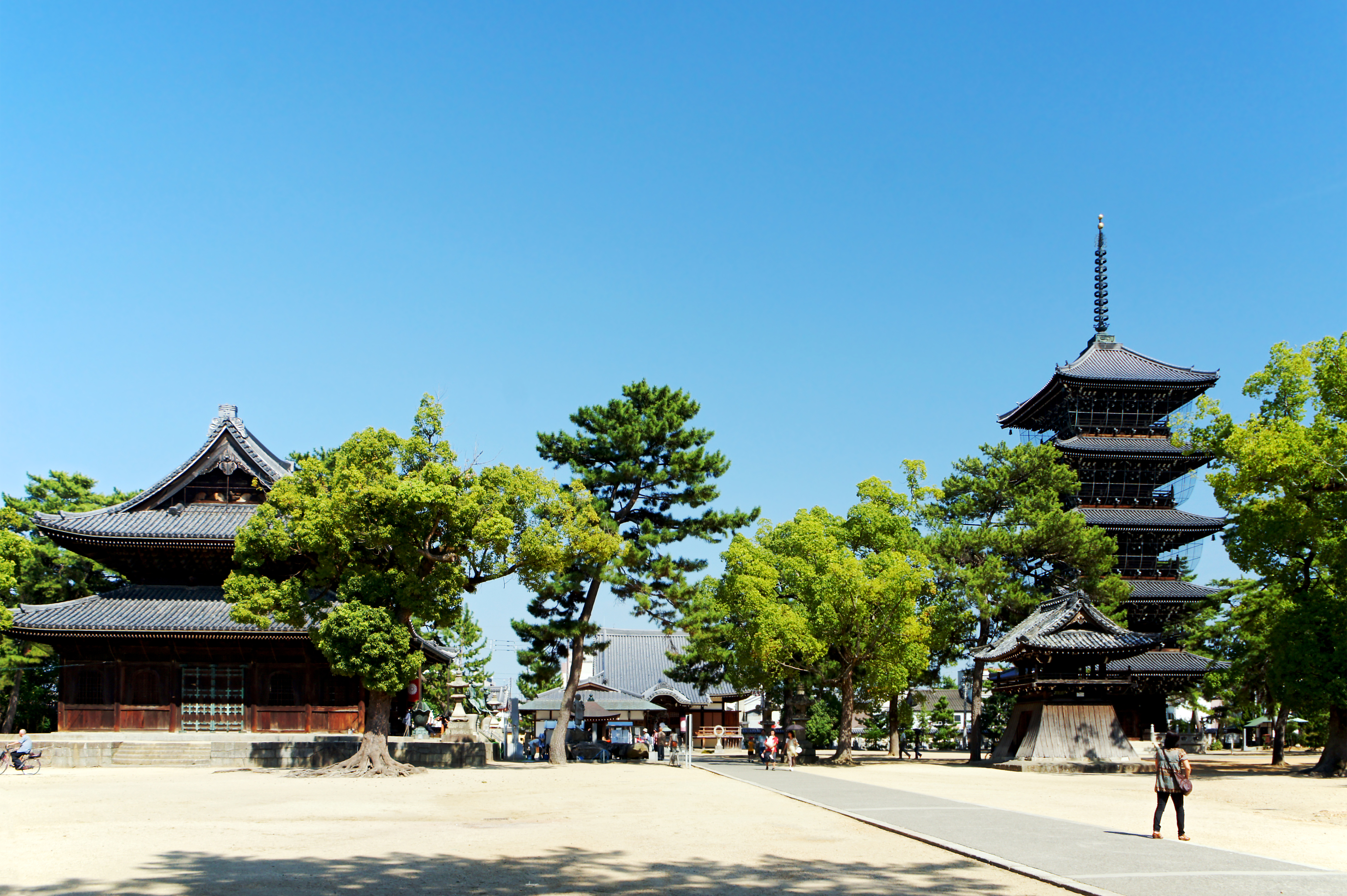

Religion
- Affiliation: Shingon Buddhism

Location
- Location: 3-1, Zentsūji-cho, Zentsūji, Kagawa
- Country: Japan
- Interactive map of Byōbuura Gogakusan Tanjō-in Zentsū-ji

Architecture
- Founder: Kūkai
- Established: 807

Zentsū-ji scenes, 2021

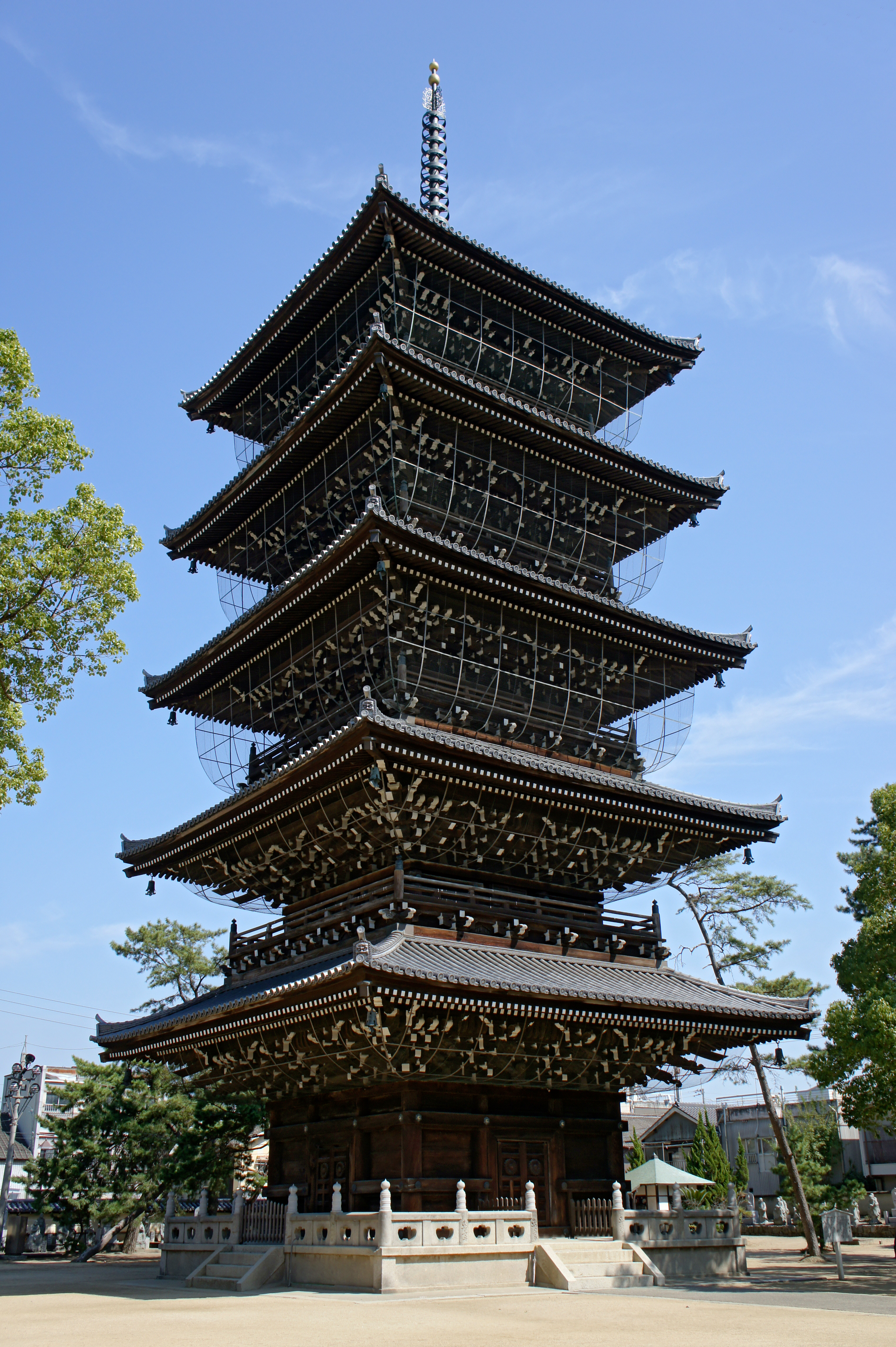
The five-storied pagoda. The current building was finished in 1902.

The Byōbuura Gogakusan Tanjō-in Zentsū-ji (屏風浦五岳山誕生院善通寺) is a Buddhist temple of the Shingon sect in Zentsūji, Kagawa, Japan. It was established in 807 by Kūkai, founder of Shingon Buddhism, who was born where the temple now stands. The oldest structure, the Shakadō Hall, dates to around 1677.

Zentsū-ji is the 75th temple of the Shikoku Pilgrimage. It is also one of the three temples on the tour that Kūkai visited, the others being Tairyūji and Muroto Misaki, as Kūkai mentioned them by name in his writings.

The temple is divided into the east precinct (tō-in) centered around the main hall (the Kondō Hall) and the west precinct (sai-in), where the Mieidō Hall stands over Kūkai's birthplace. The temple grounds burned down in the 16th century during the war-torn Sengoku period, and many structures have been destroyed and rebuilt over the centuries.

== Notable buildings ==
=== East precinct (tō-in) ===
- Gojūnotō – five-storied pagoda and tallest temple structure. Current pagoda completed in 1902. An Important Cultural Property of Japan.
- Kondō Hall– the main hall (hondō) of the temple. Last rebuilt in 1699. An Important Cultural Property.
- Shakadō Hall – formerly stood over Kukai's birthplace as the Mieidō Hall until moved and renamed in 1831. Built sometime 1673–1680. A Registered Tangible Cultural Property.
- Bell tower – Registered Tangible Cultural Property.
- Nandaimon – Registered Tangible Cultural Property
- Chūmon

=== West precinct (sai-in) ===
- Mieidō Hall – stands over Kūkai's birthplace. Current structure built in 1831; renovated in 1937. A Registered Tangible Cultural Property.
- Nio gate – It was rebuilt in 1889. Registered Tangible Cultural Property.
- Gomadō – It was rebuilt in 1889. Registered Tangible Cultural Property.
- Henjōkaku

== Temple treasures ==
- Gilt bronze finial of a pilgrim's staff – National Treasure
- Preface to the Lotus Sutra decorated with Buddhas – National Treasure
- Jizō Bosatsu ryūzō – Important Cultural Property
- Kichijōten ryūzō – Important Cultural Property

== Gallery ==
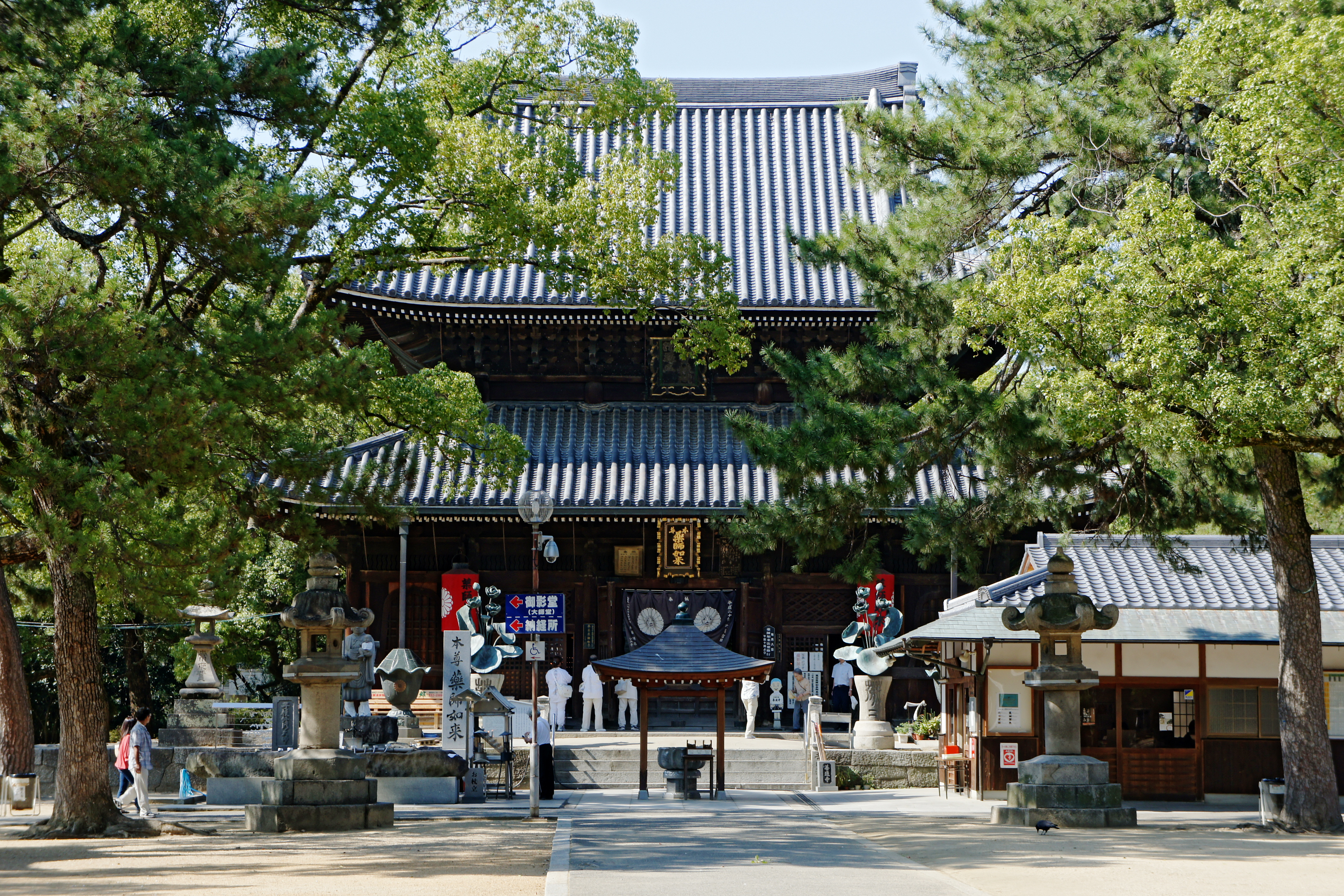
Kondō Hall (main hall)

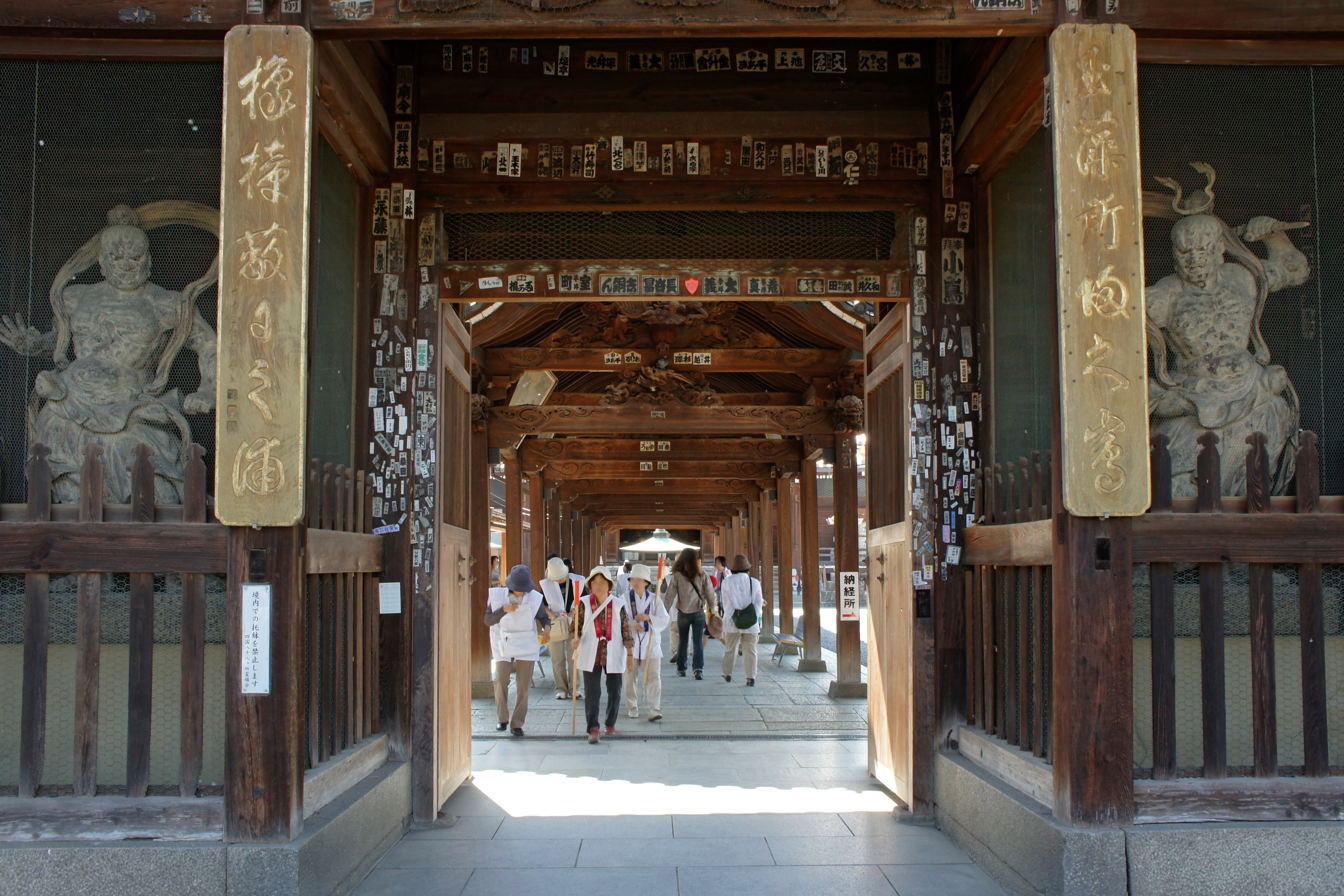
Nio Gate and Kairō

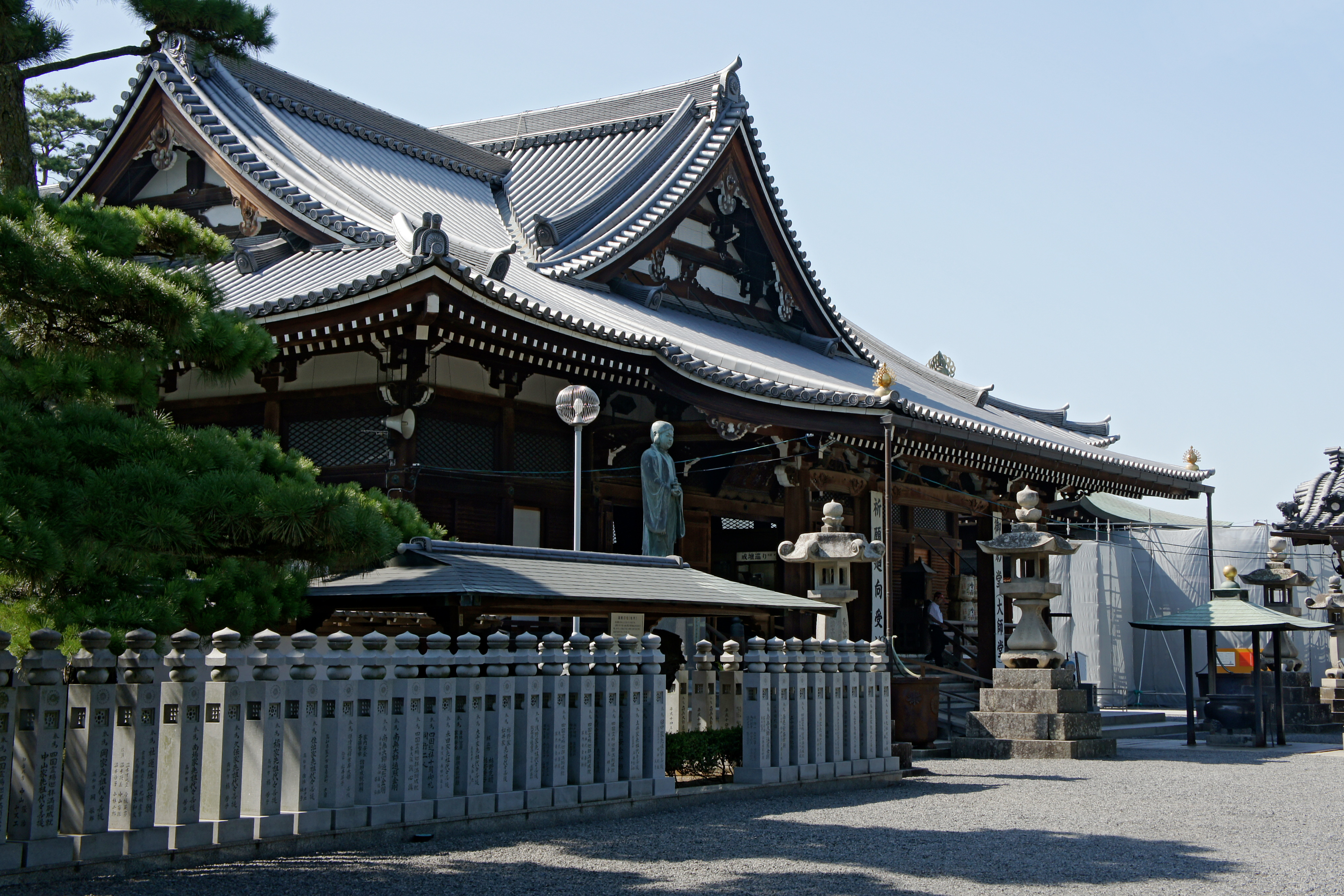
Mieidō Hall

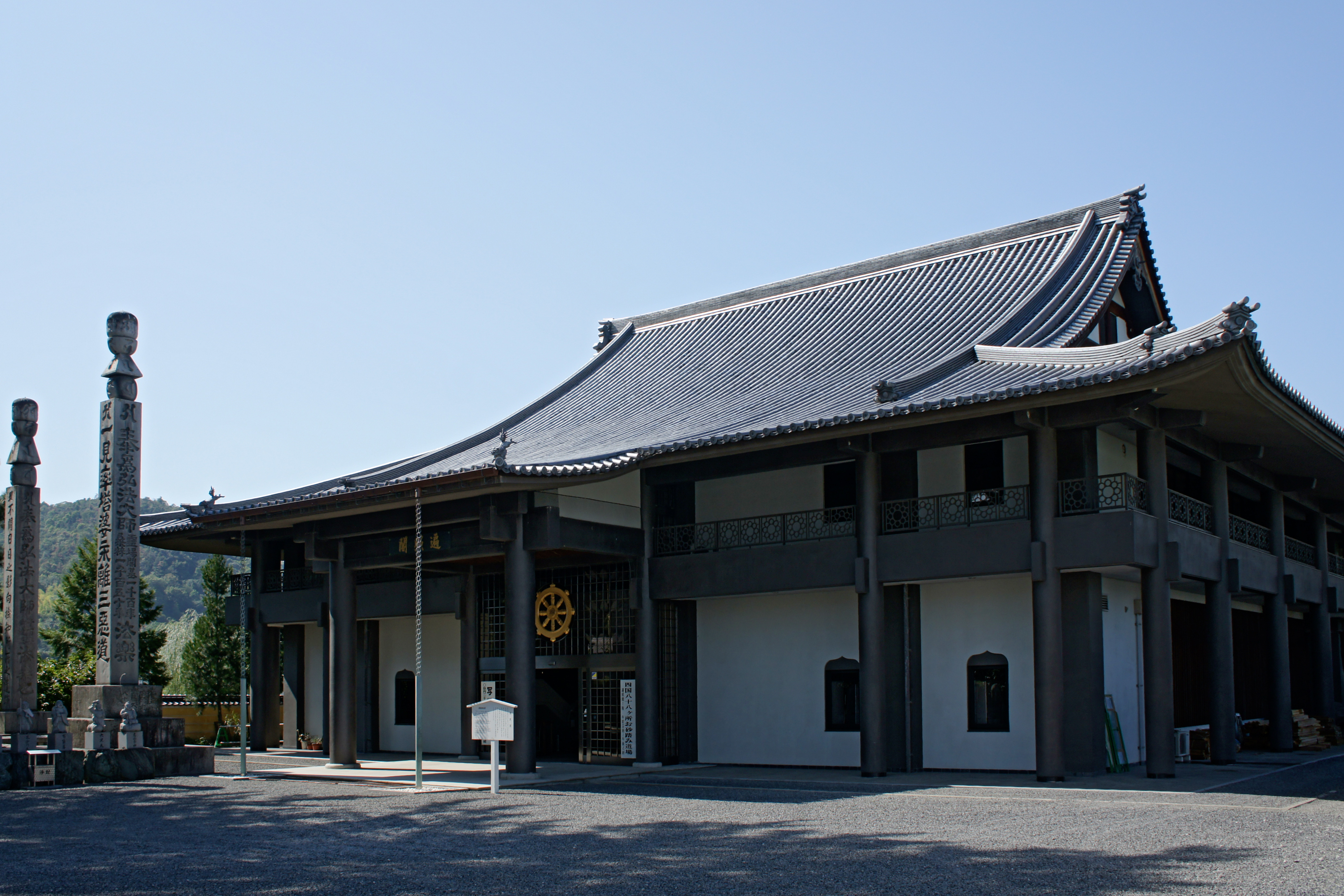
Henjōkaku

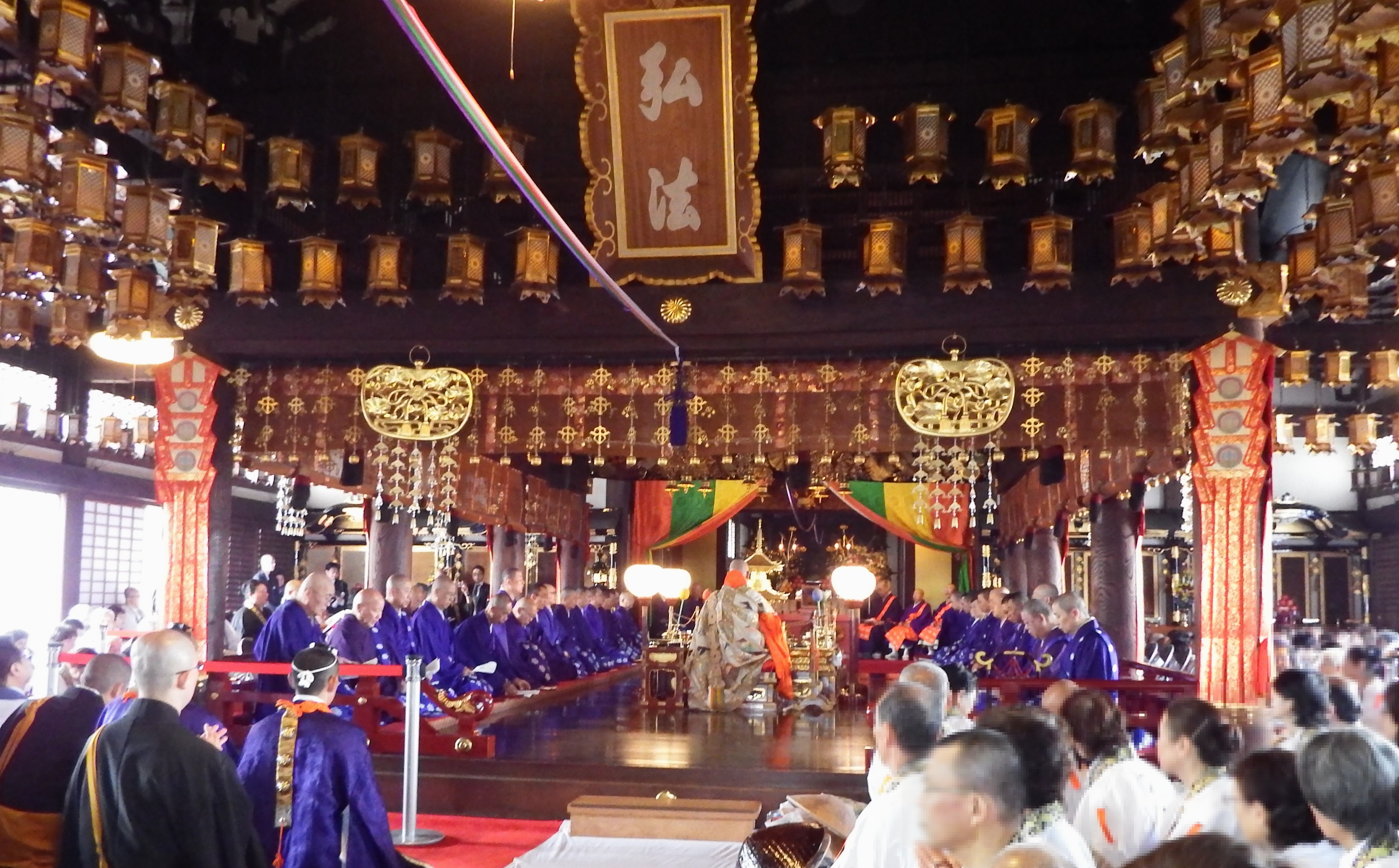

== See also ==
- Qinglong Temple – temple in China that Kūkai modeled Zentsuji after
- National Treasures of Japan
  - List of National Treasures of Japan (writings)
  - List of National Treasures of Japan (crafts: others)
