= Perspicuibacter marinus =

Scientific classification
- Domain: Bacteria
- Kingdom: Pseudomonadati
- Phylum: Pseudomonadota
- Class: Gammaproteobacteria
- Order: Arenicellales
- Family: Arenicellaceae
- Genus: Perspicuibacter
- Species: P. marinus

Binomial name
- Perspicuibacter marinus Teramoto et al., 2015

Species of bacteria

Perspicuibacter marinus is smooth, lenticular, light yellow, semi-translucent bacterium found on surface seawater of Muroto City, Kochi prefecture, Japan. It is a general proposed novel species.
