= Hotsumisaki-ji =

Shingon Buddhist temple in Kōchi, Japan

- 最御崎寺
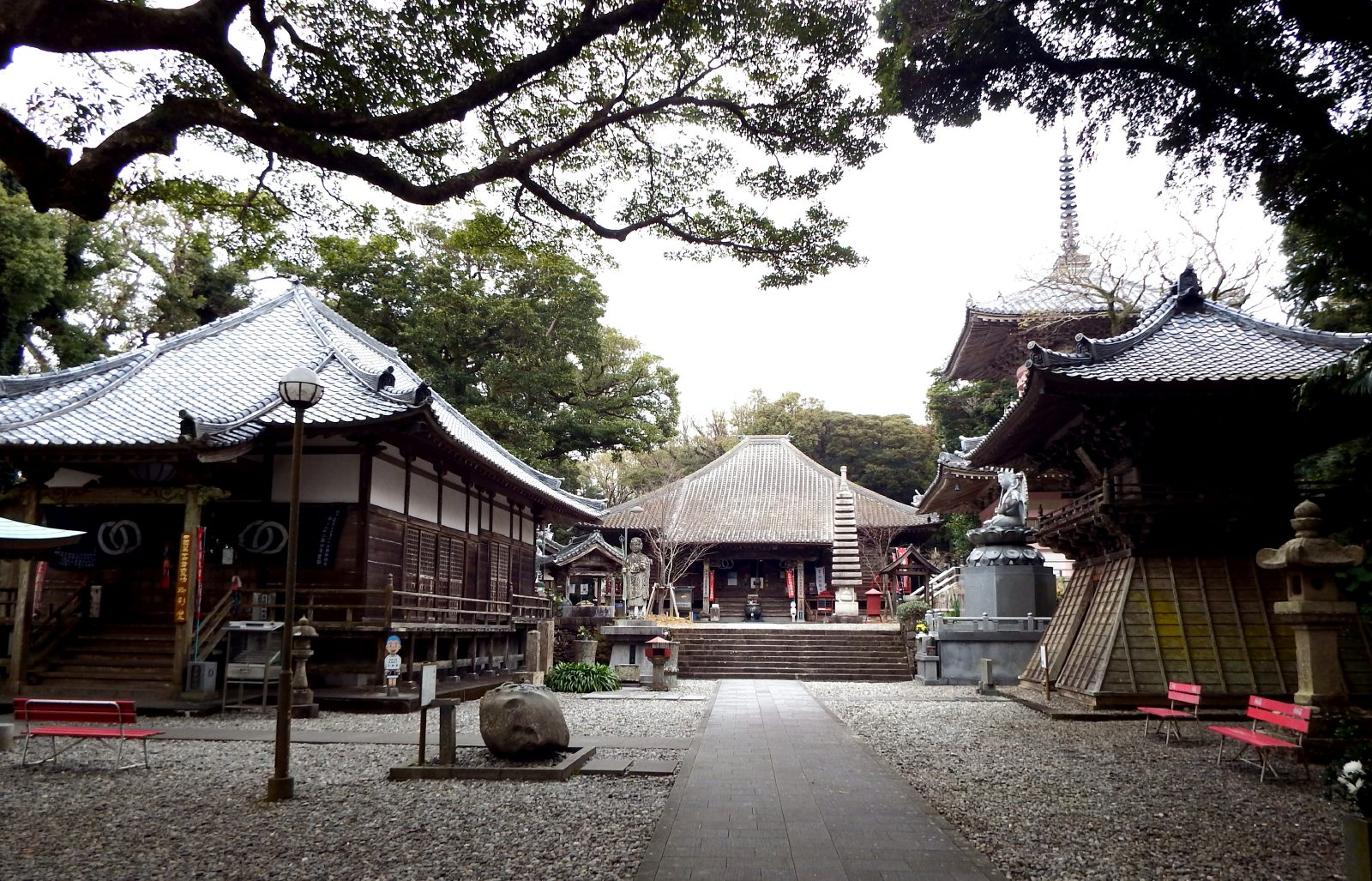

Religion
- Affiliation: Shingon
- Deity: Bodhisattva Ākāśagarbha

Location
- Location: Kōchi, Kōchi-ken
- Country: Japan
- Interactive map of Hotsumisaki-ji
- Coordinates: 33°14′57″N 134°10′33″E

Architecture
- Established: 807
- Completed: 1914 (Reconstruction)

Website
- http://www.88shikokuhenro.jp/24hotsumisakiji/

Hotsumisaki-ji (最御崎寺) is a Shingon Buddhist temple located in Muroto, Kōchi, Japan. It is the 24th temple of the Shikoku Pilgrimage, and the first located in Kochi, representing the start of the "austerity and discipline" (修行, shugyō) stage of the pilgrimage.

== History ==
Unsatisfied with his studies in the city, Kūkai continued to train in the mountains for 5 years from the age of 19 year in the 11th year of Enryaku (792). In his work "Sangō Shiiki", he wrote, "I am training in Kochi's Muroto Cape". It is said that he chanted the mantra of the Bodhisattva Ākāśagarbha (Kokūzō) in a nearby cave (Mikurodo Cave). According to the temple records, he opened the temple in the 2nd year of Daidō (807), engraving the main deity Kokūzō Bosatsu at the request of Emperor Saga. Initially located at the summit of Shijuji Temple, it was believed to have been moved to its current location sometime during the Kantoku Period (1044–1055).

After it was burnt down during a fire, the entire temple complex was rebuilt in the Genna period (1615–1624) with the support of Tadayoshi Yamanouchi, a daimyo who was governing Tosa Domain at the time. The temple further sustained further damage and destruction under the Shinbutsu bunri decree during the Meiji era, and was reconstructed again in 1914.

== Cultural Heritage Objects ==
=== Important Cultural Properties ===
- Marble bodhisattva statue in the half lotus position (late Heian Period), 82.4 cm. In Japan there are many Buddhist stone carvings, but marble carvings are rare. The statue is sitting with the right knee up and the gourd and clothing is delicately carved.
- Seated wooden Yakushi statue (late Heian Period) made of wood and lacquer foil, 86.3 cm.
- Standing Gakkō statue (late Heian Period) made of wood and lacquer foil, 101.6 cm.
- Two lacquered tables, donated in the first year of the Kōryaku Period (1379).

=== Kochi Prefecture Designated Cultural Properties ===
- Round plaque of sitting Kokūzō bodhisattvas.

=== Muroto City Designated Cultural Properties ===
- There are numerous properties.

== Access ==
=== Train ===
- Kannoura Station (41.2 km)
- Nahari Station (26.9 km)

=== Bus ===
- Kōchi Tōbu Kōtsū Bus – Murotomisaki (0.9 km)

=== Car ===
- Kochi Route 203, Muroto Skyline (0.1 km)
