= Shinshō-ji =

Buddhist temple in Kōchi Prefecture, Japan

- 津照寺
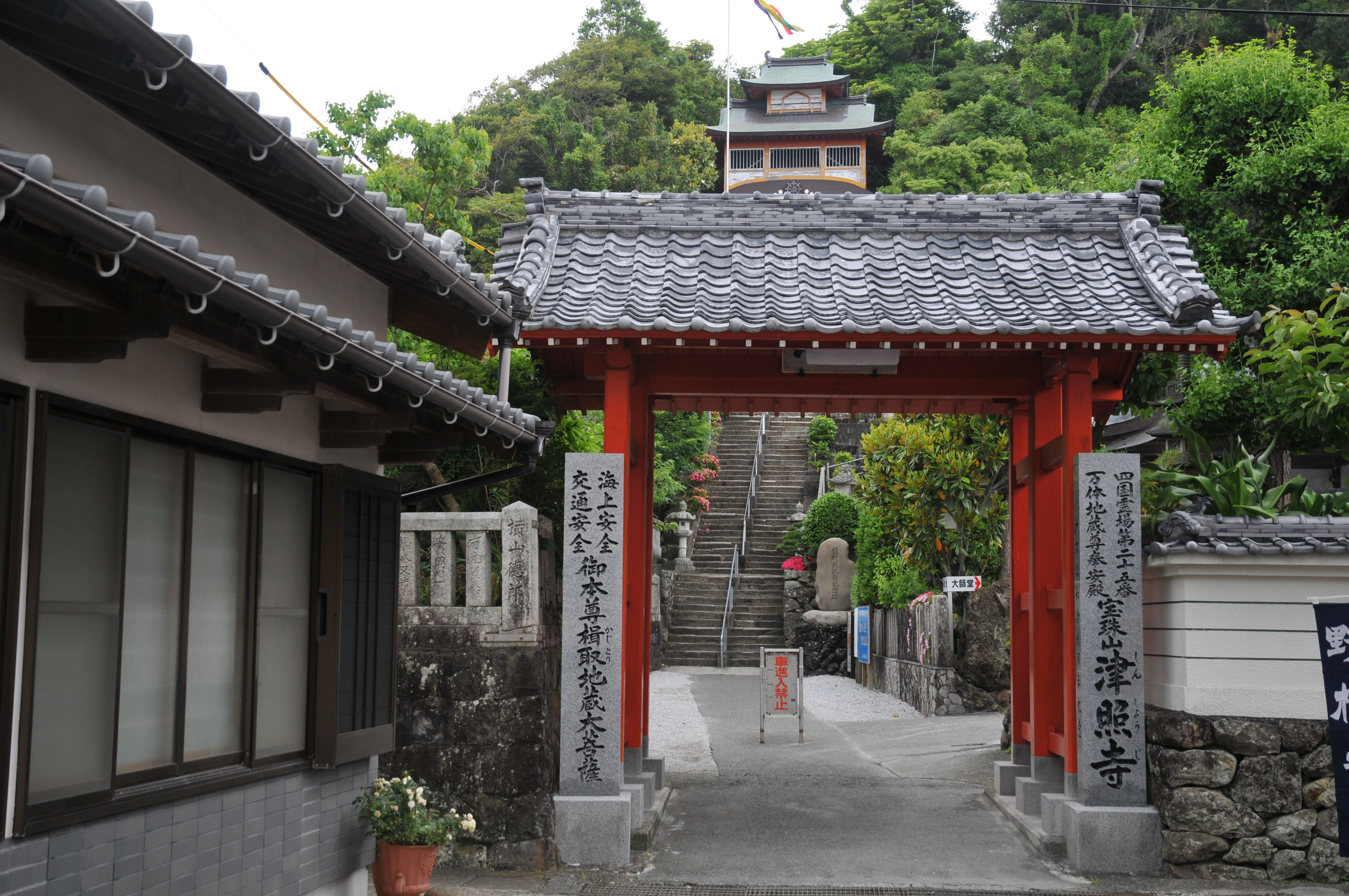

Religion
- Affiliation: Shingon

Location
- Location: Kōchi-ken
- Country: Japan
- Interactive map of Shinshō-ji
- Coordinates: 33.287806°N 134.14825°E

Website
- http://www.88shikokuhenro.jp/25shinshoji/

Shinshō-ji is a Shingon Buddhist temple located in Muroto, Kōchi, Japan. It is the 25th temple of the Shikoku Pilgrimage.
