= Kaki Mon'in =

Court lady of Japanese emperor Go-Murakami

Kaki Mon'in (嘉喜門院, died 1380s?) was a Japanese noblewoman, Buddhist nun and waka poet of the Nanboku-chō period. She may have been the daughter of Ano Sanetame. She was a concubine of Japan's 97th emperor, Emperor Go-Murakami, an emperor of the Southern Court, and the mother of the 99th, Emperor Go-Kameyama, and possibly the 98th, Emperor Chōkei. Her birth name may have been Ano Katsuko or Ano Shōshi (阿野勝子), but the sources for this name date from the seventeenth century and later.

Seventeen of her poems were included in the Shin'yō Wakashū, an imperially commissioned waka anthology associated with the Southern Court, into which she was married. Her poetry commemorating the death of her late husband is particularly well-regarded.

== Biography ==
Kaki Mon'in's early life and family background are uncertain. She may have been the daughter of the courtier Ano Sanetame.

She went to court as the adopted daughter of Nijō Moromoto, becoming the concubine of Emperor Go-Murakami and giving birth to his son Emperor Go-Kameyama. She may have also been the mother of Emperor Chōkei.

After Emperor Go-Murakami's death in 1368, she was given the title in, and later became a nun.

She probably died at some point between 1381 and 1392.

== Name ==
Some Edo period genealogies give her name as "Shōshi" (勝子), (Note: This name may also have been read "Katsuko".) but this is uncertain. Kaki Mon'in is a name she received in widowhood after 1368.

== Works ==
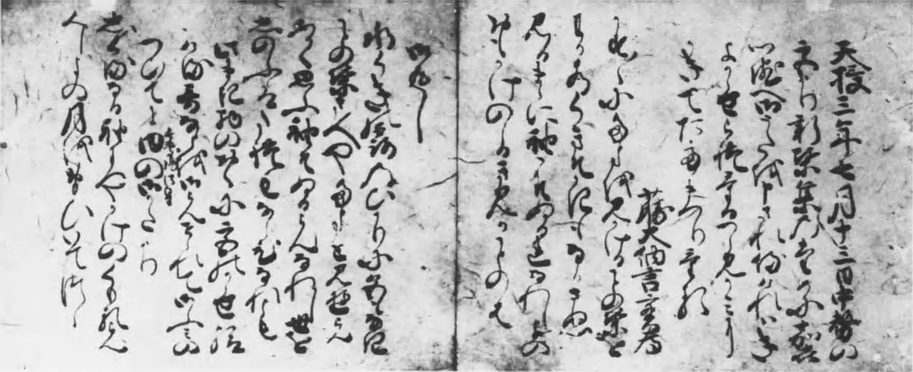
Page from the Kaki Mon'in Go-shū, in the Sonkei-kaku Archives.

She left a private collection of waka, the Kaki Mon'in Go-shū (嘉喜門院御集), the notes (袖書 sodegaki) included in which are a valuable historical source for the accession of Emperor Chōkei.

In the seventh month of 1377, at Prince Munenaga's request, she submitted the Kaki Mon'in Go-shū, from which seventeen poems were included in the Shin'yō Wakashū, an important fourteenth-century anthology compiled by the Southern Court.

== Reception ==
The scholar Hiroaki Hamaguchi, in his article on her for the Nihon Koten Bungaku Daijiten, especially praised her poetry mourning the late Emperor Go-Murakami.

== Works cited ==
- Hamaguchi, Hiroaki (1983). "Kaki Mon'in". Nihon Koten Bungaku Daijiten 日本古典文学大辞典 (in Japanese). Vol. 1. Tokyo: Iwanami Shoten. p. 588. OCLC 11917421.
- Nishio, Kazumi (1994). "Kaki Mon'in" 嘉喜門院. Asahi Nihon Rekishi Jinbutsu Jiten (in Japanese). Asahi Shinbun-sha.
