= Kairō =

Cloister-like part of a Japanese Buddhist temple

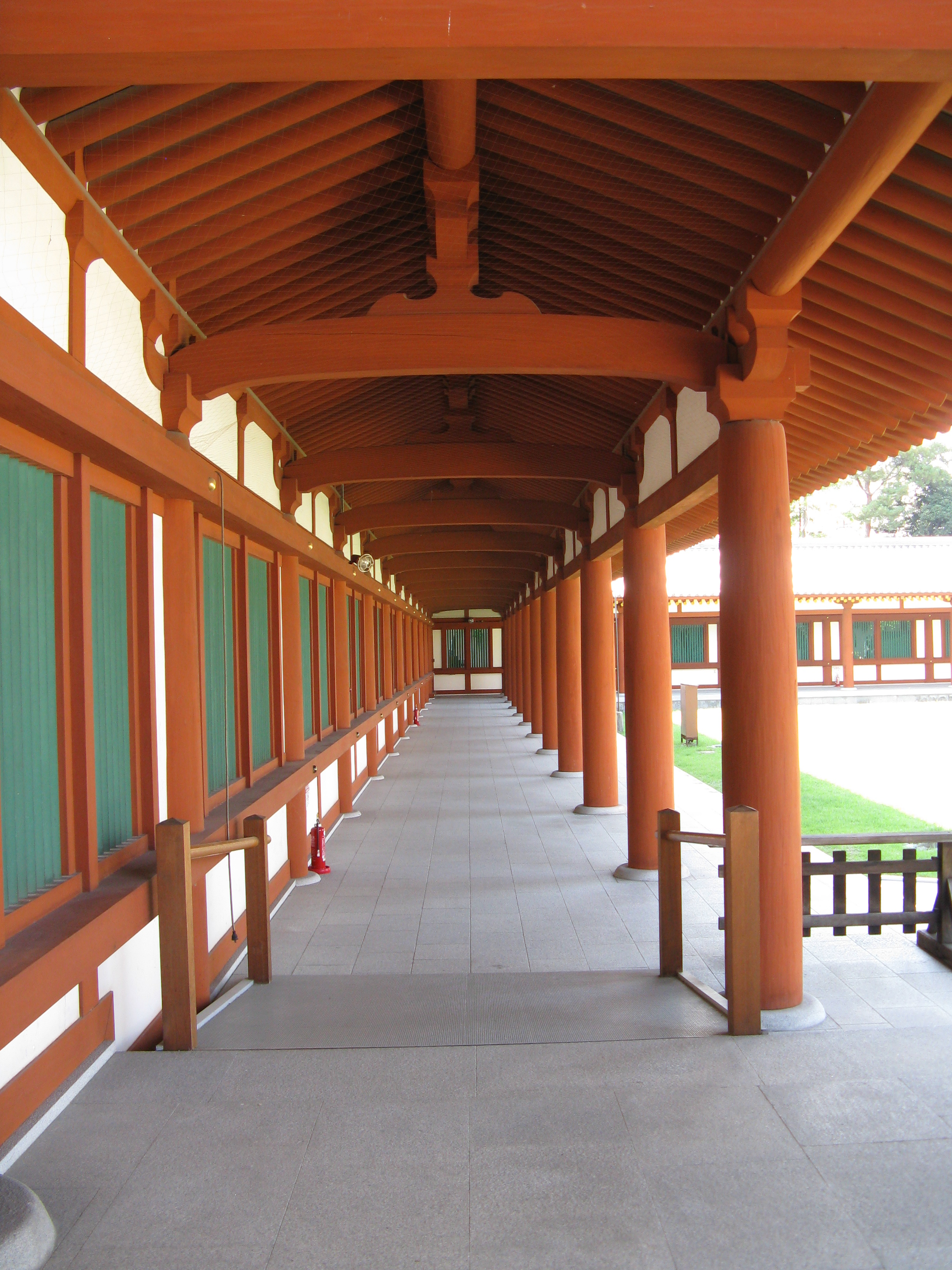

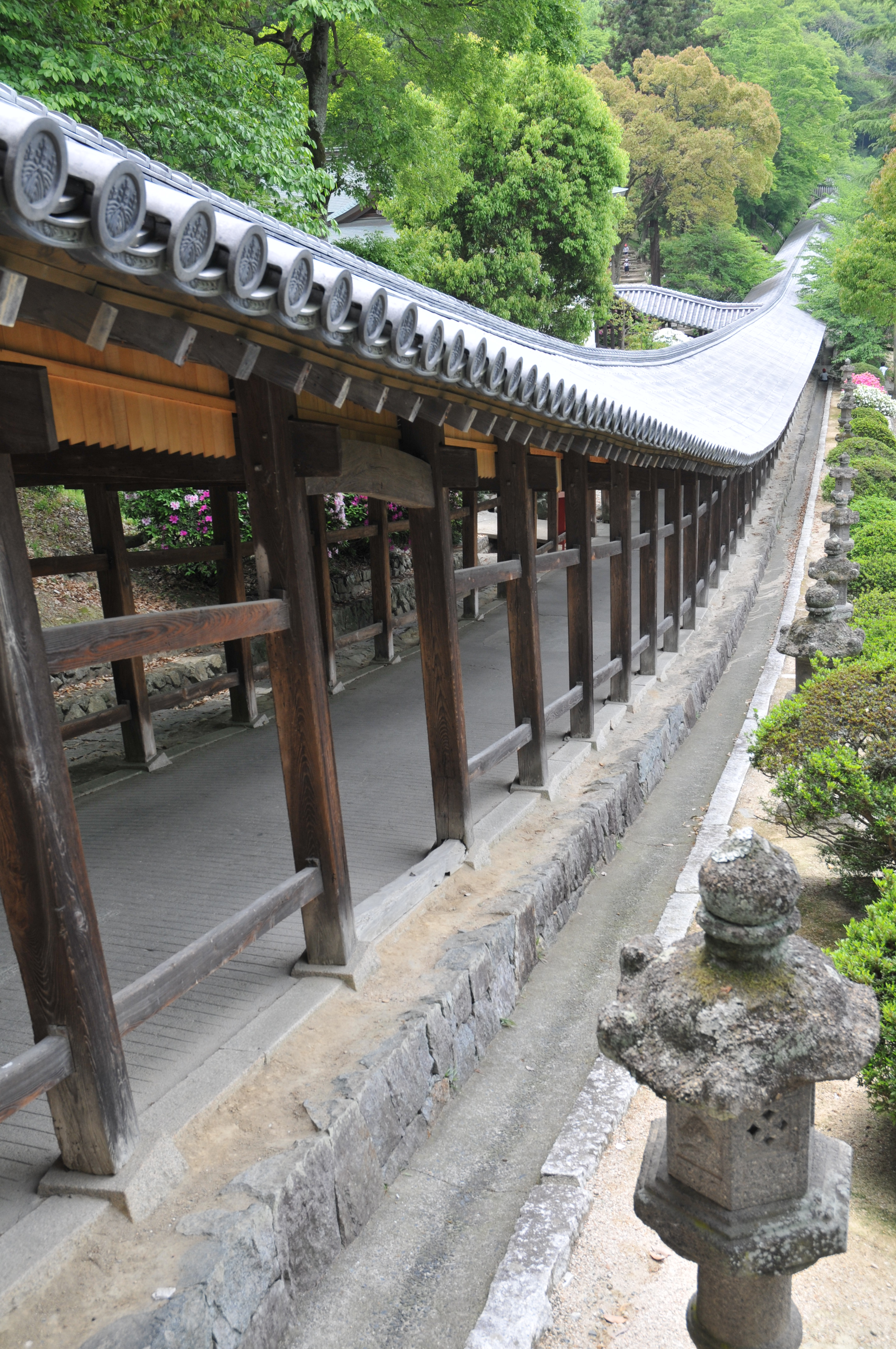

Two examples of kairō

Kairō (回廊 or 廻廊), bu (廡), sōrō or horō (歩廊) is the Japanese version of a cloister, a covered corridor originally built around the most sacred area of a Buddhist temple, a zone which contained the kondō and the tō. Nowadays it can be found also at Shinto shrines and at shinden-zukuri aristocratic residences.

The kairō and the rōmon were among the most important among the garan elements which appeared during the Heian period. The first surrounded the holiest part of the garan, while the second was its main exit. Neither was originally characteristic of Shinto shrines, but in time they often came to replace the traditional shrine surrounding fence called tamagaki. The earliest example of a kairō/rōmon complex can be found at Iwashimizu Hachiman-gū, a shrine now but a former shrine-temple (神宮寺). The rōmon is believed to have been built in 886, and the kairō roughly at the same time. Itsukushima Jinja is an example of the mature form of the complex.

Two types of kairō exist, one 1-bay wide and another 2-bay wide, the bay being the space between two pillars. The first is by far the most common.

== Tanrō ==
The 1-bay wide type is supported by just two rows of pillars and is therefore called tanrō (単廊; lit. 'single corridor'). Typical windows called renjimado (連子窓) (see gallery) let air and light in.

== Fukurō ==
The 2-bay wide type is supported by three rows of pillars, is called fukurō (複廊; lit. 'multiple corridors') and is divided in two identical corridors by a wall (see model in the gallery). Although it is known that several existed at major Buddhist temples, for example at Tōdai-ji, none is extant. Some fukurō survive however at Shinto shrines.

== Gallery ==
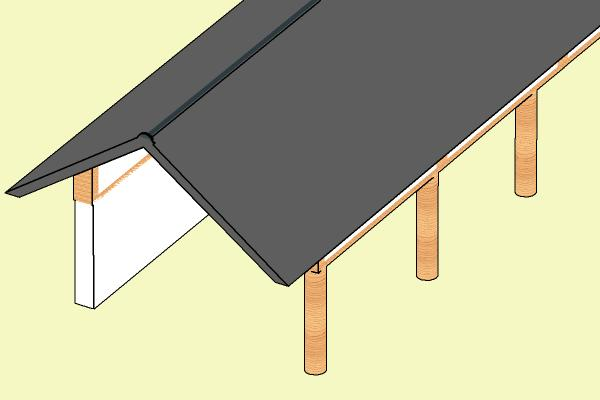
Drawing of a tanrō

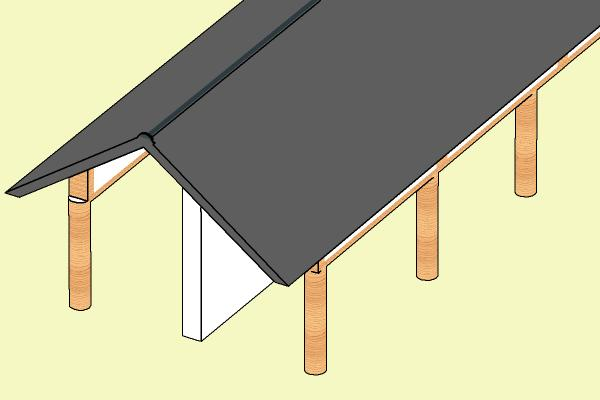
Drawing of a fukurō

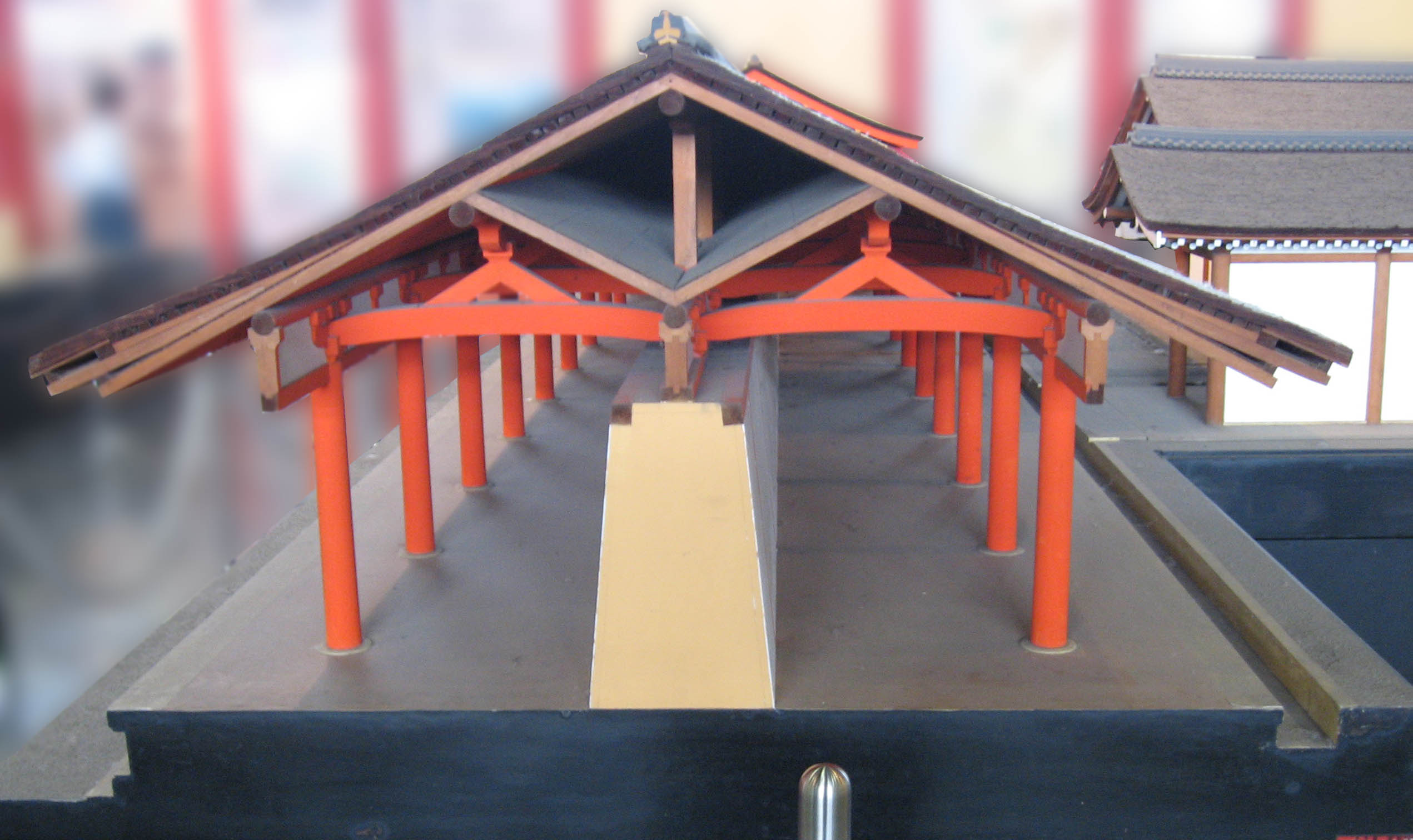
Model of a fukurō

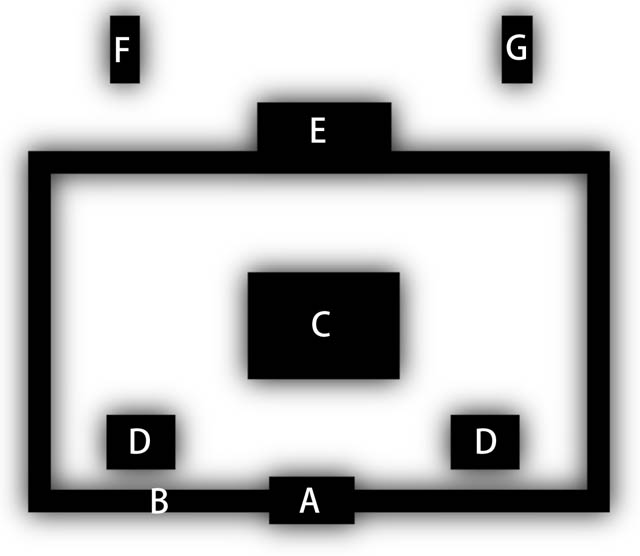
Plan of Yakushi-ji with the kairō surrounding the garan

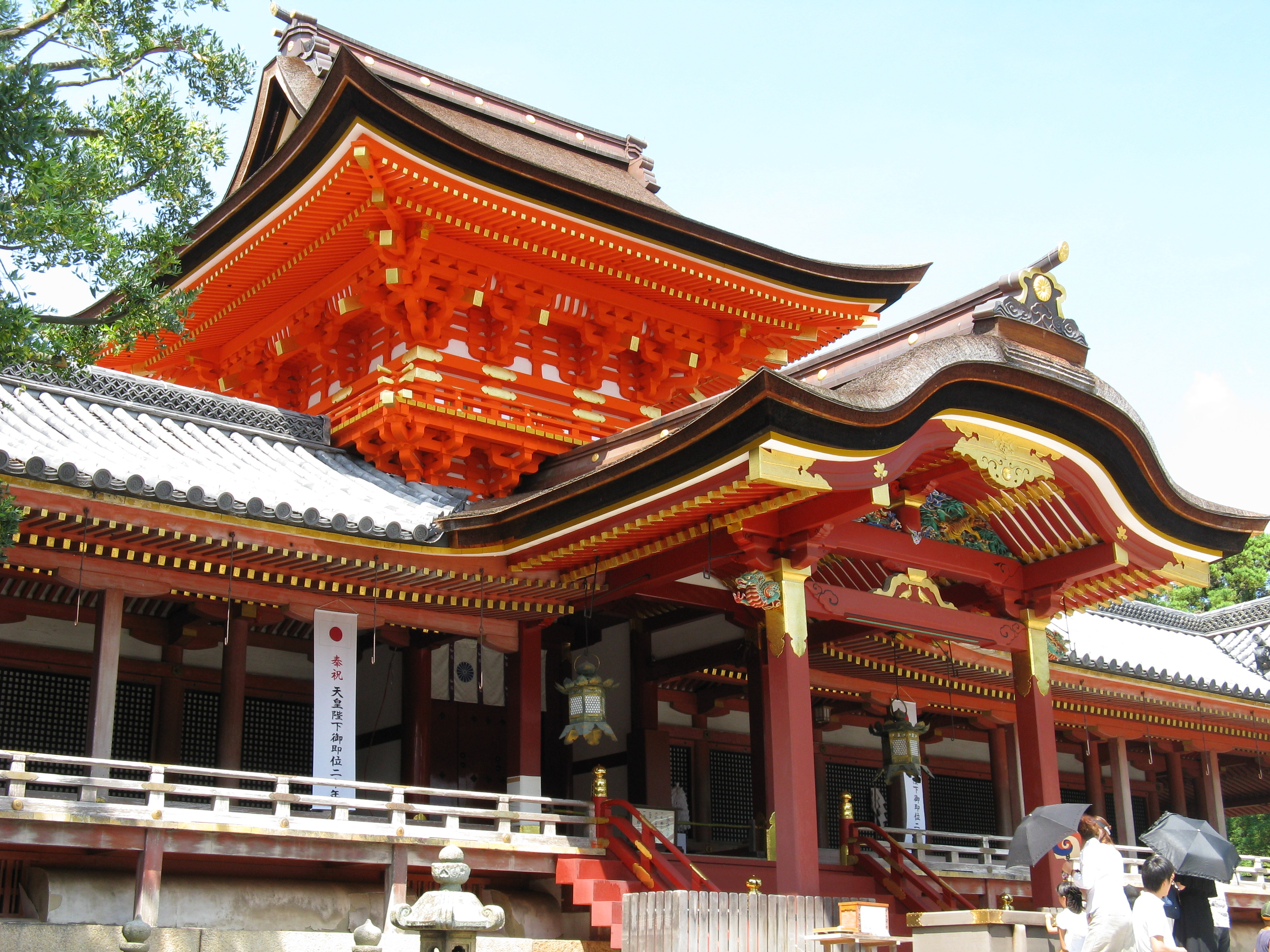
Iwashimizu Hachiman-gū's fukurō and rōmon

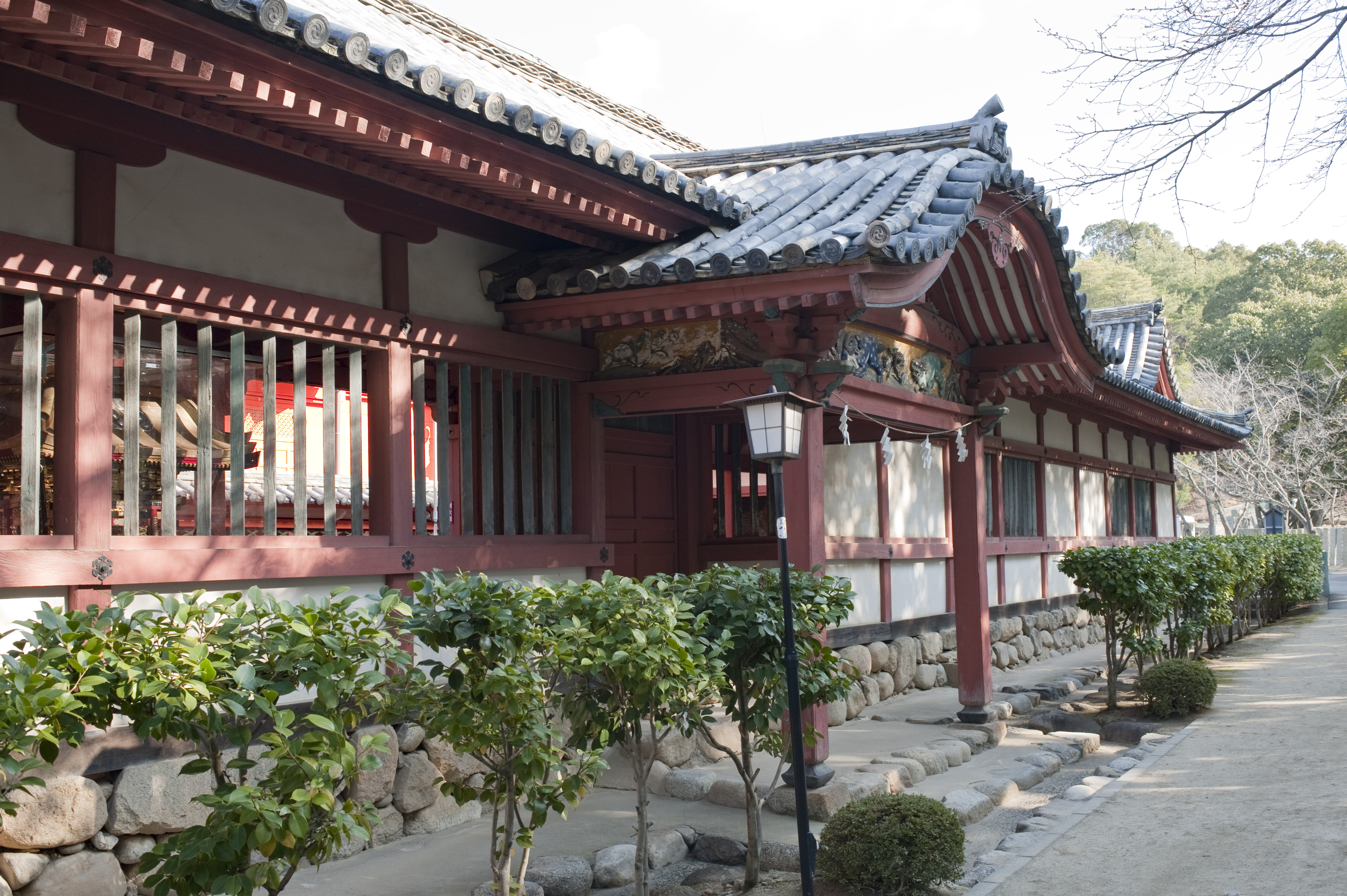
External view of a kairō's wall with renjimado

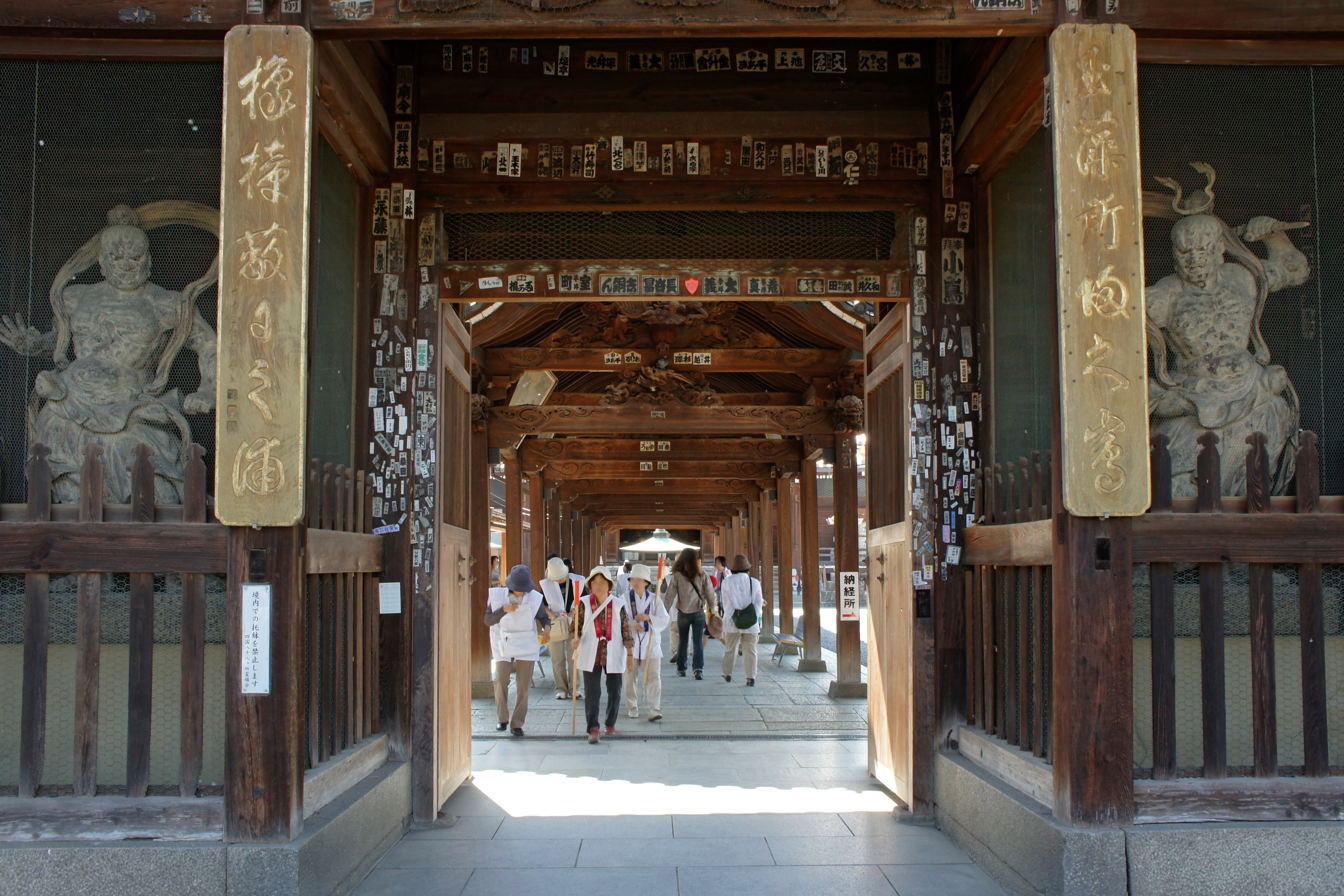
View from the entrance of Zentsū-ji's kairō

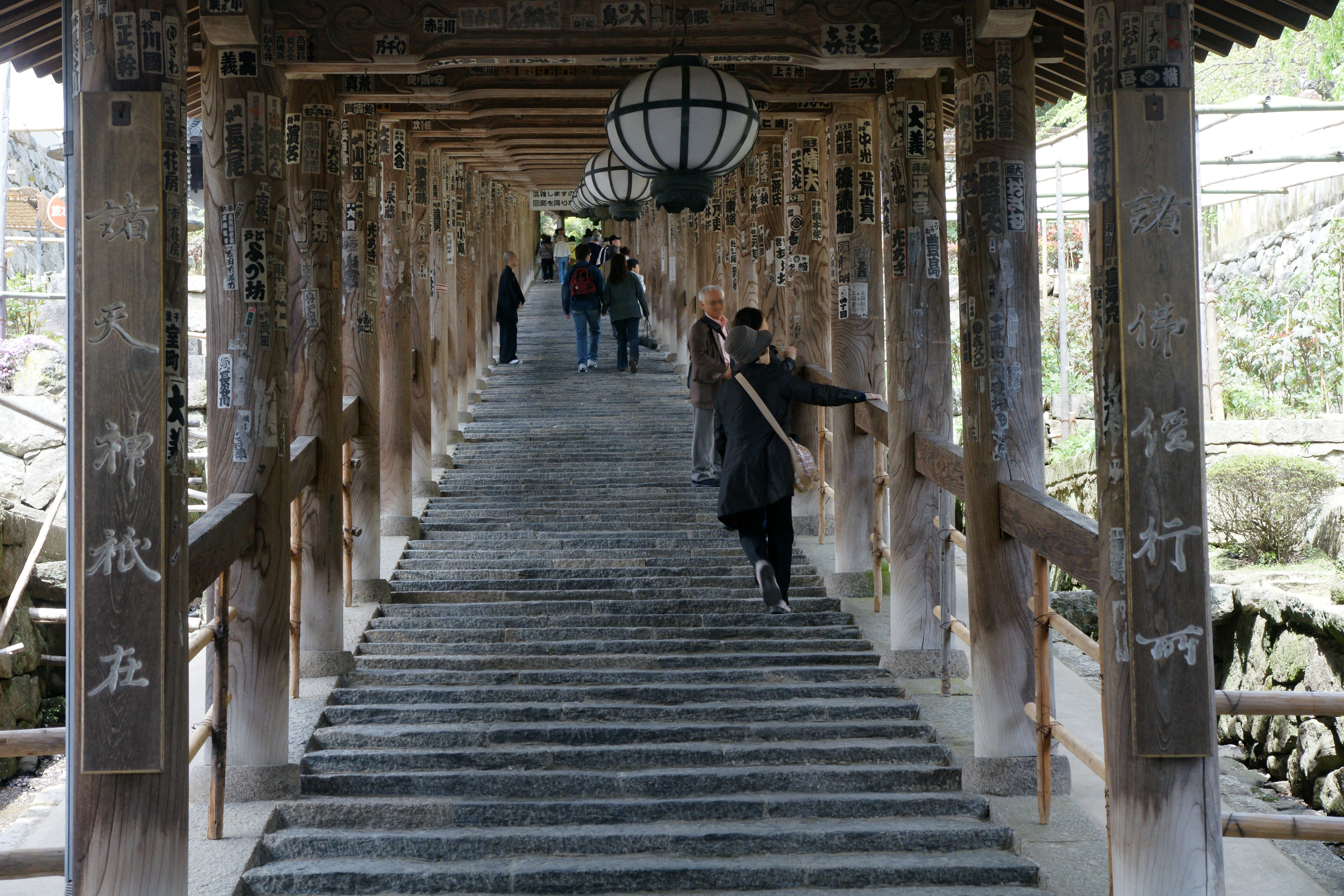
Internal view of Hase-dera's kairō

== See also ==
- Glossary of Shinto
