= Eiwa =

Period of Japanese history (1375–1379)

Eiwa (永和) was a Japanese era name (年号, nengō, lit. year name) of the Northern Court during the Era of Northern and Southern Courts after Ōan and before Kōryaku. This period spanned the years from February 1375 through March 1379. The emperor in Kyoto was Emperor Go-En'yū (後円融天皇, Go-En'yū-tennō) The Southern Court rival in Yoshino during this time-frame was Emperor Chōkei (長慶天皇, Chōkei-tennō).

== Nanboku-chō overview ==
The Imperial seats during the Nanboku-chō period were in relatively close proximity, but geographically distinct. They were conventionally identified as: Northern capital : Kyoto; Southern capital : Yoshino.

During the Meiji period, an Imperial decree dated March 3, 1911 established that the legitimate reigning monarchs of this period were the direct descendants of Emperor Go-Daigo through Emperor Go-Murakami, whose Southern Court (南朝, nanchō) had been established in exile in Yoshino, near Nara.

Until the end of the Edo period, the militarily superior pretender-Emperors supported by the Ashikaga shogunate had been mistakenly incorporated in Imperial chronologies despite the undisputed fact that the Imperial Regalia were not in their possession.

This illegitimate Northern Court (北朝, hokuchō) had been established in Kyoto by Ashikaga Takauji.

== Change of era ==
- 1375, also called Eiwa gannen (永和元年): The new era name was created to mark an event or series of events. The previous era ended and the new one commenced in Ōan 8.

In this time frame, Tenju (1375–1381) was the Southern Court equivalent nengō.

== Events of the Eiwa era ==
- 1375 (Eiwa 1, 3rd month): Shōgun Ashikaga Yoshimitsu visits the Iwashimizu Hachiman-gū where he worships publicly; and he offers a sword for the shrine's treasury, gold foil for the embellishment of the shrine, and racehorses for the shrine's stable.
- 1375 (Eiwa 2, 4th month): For the first time, Shōgun Yoshimitsu is permitted to enter the precincts of the Imperial quarters at the Imperial palace in Kyoto.
- 1377 -- Goryeo (Korea) diplomatic envoy Chŏng Mong-ju met with the shogunal deputy (探題, tandai) in Kyūshū, Imagawa Ryōshun. The objective of this diplomatic mission was to begin negotiating steps to control pirates (wakō).
- 1378 (Eiwa 4, 3rd month): Yoshimitsu moves into his new home in Muromachi; and the luxurious house and grounds are called Hana-no-Gosho

== Notes ==
Preceded by Ōan	Era or nengō Eiwa; 1375–1379	Succeeded by Kōryaku
