= Muroto =

Muroto 室戸市
- City
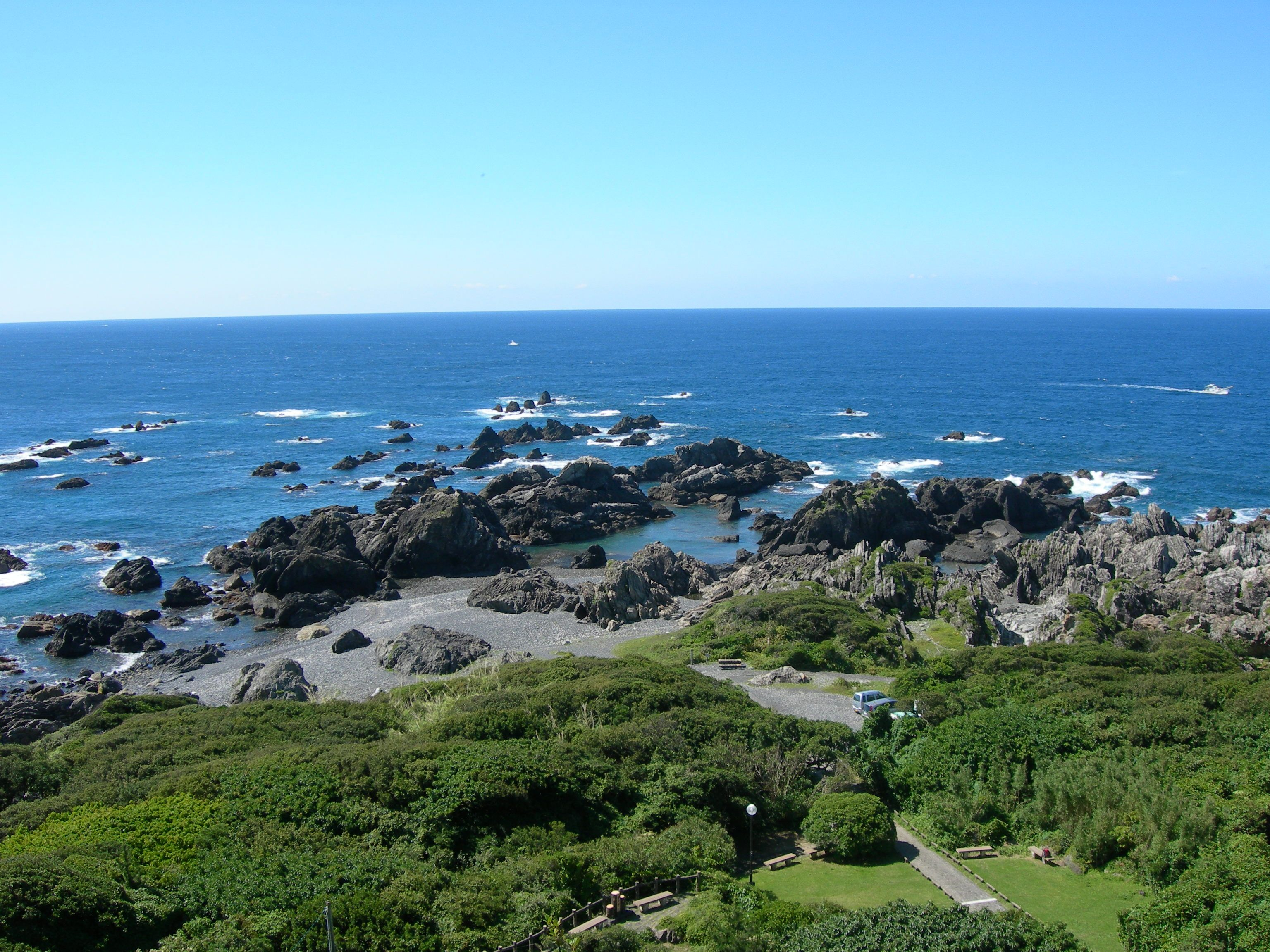
- View of the Pacific Ocean from Cape Muroto

- Flag Emblem
- /0/queryThe property query is required; /0/idsThe property ids is required; /0Failed to match at least one schema; /0/titleThe property title is required; /0/serviceDoes not have a value in the enumeration ["page"]; /0Failed to match exactly one schema; /0/geometriesThe property geometries is required; /0/typeDoes not have a value in the enumeration ["GeometryCollection"]; /0/typeDoes not have a value in the enumeration ["MultiPolygon"]; /0/typeDoes not have a value in the enumeration ["Point"]; /0/typeDoes not have a value in the enumeration ["MultiPoint"]; /0/typeDoes not have a value in the enumeration ["LineString"]; /0/typeDoes not have a value in the enumeration ["MultiLineString"]; /0/typeDoes not have a value in the enumeration ["Polygon"]; /0/coordinatesThe property coordinates is required; /0/geometryThe property geometry is required; /0/typeDoes not have a value in the enumeration ["Feature"]; /0/featuresThe property features is required; /0/typeDoes not have a value in the enumeration ["FeatureCollection"]; Location of Muroto in Kōchi Prefecture

- Location in Japan
- Coordinates: 33°17′24″N 134°09′07″E
- Country: Japan
- Region: Shikoku
- Prefecture: Kōchi

Government
  - Mayor: Soichiro Ueta

Area
  - Total: 248.18 km^{2} (95.82 sq mi)

Population (January 31, 2024)
  - Total: 11,633
  - Density: 46.873/km^{2} (121.40/sq mi)
- Time zone: UTC+09:00 (JST)
- City hall address: 25-1 Ukitsu, Muroto-shi, Kōchi-ken 781-7185
- Climate: Cfa
- Website: Official website
- Symbols
- Bird: Japanese white-eye
- Flower: Hamayū
- Tree: Ubamegashi (Quercus phillyraeoides)

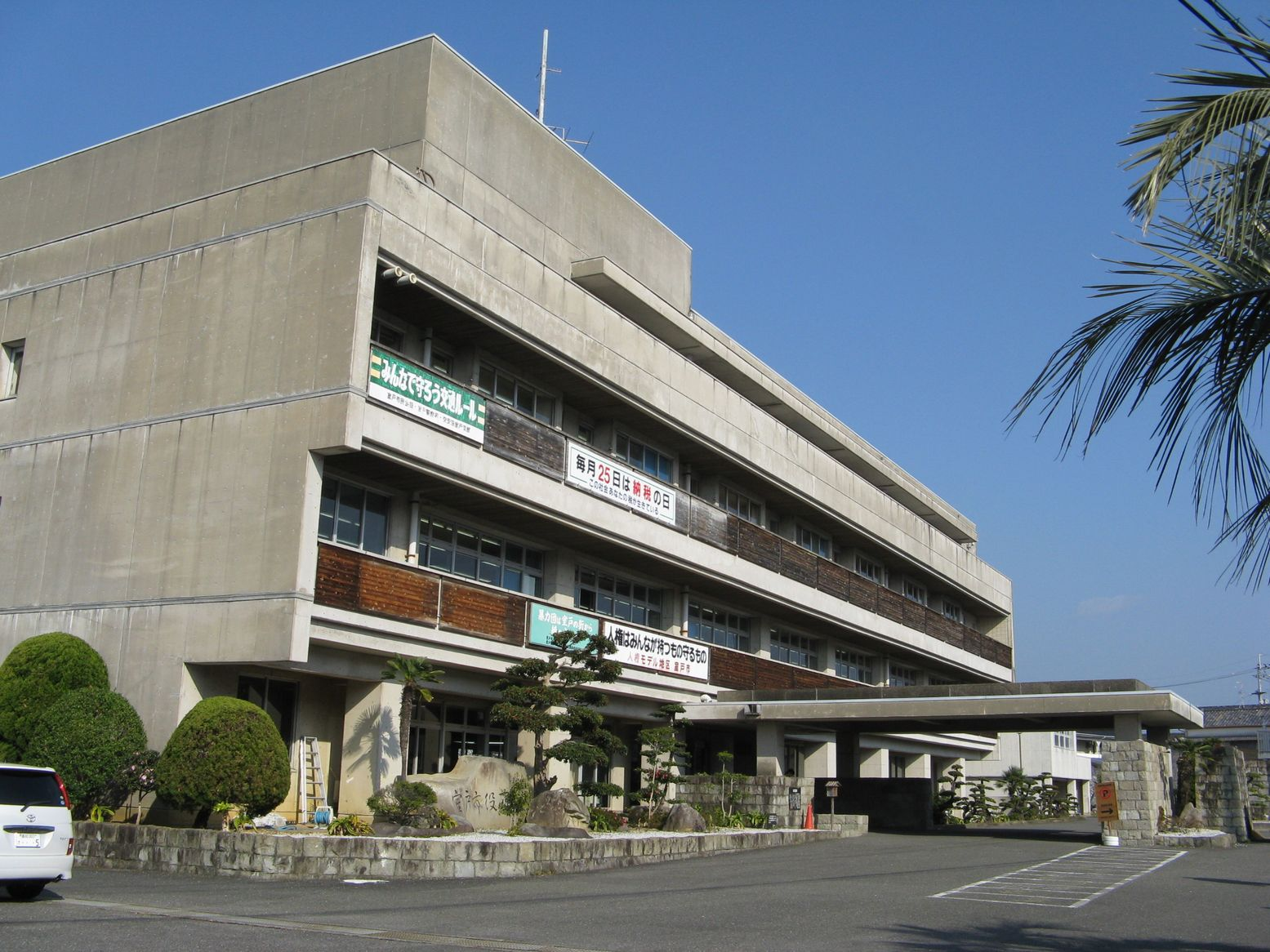
Muroto City Hall

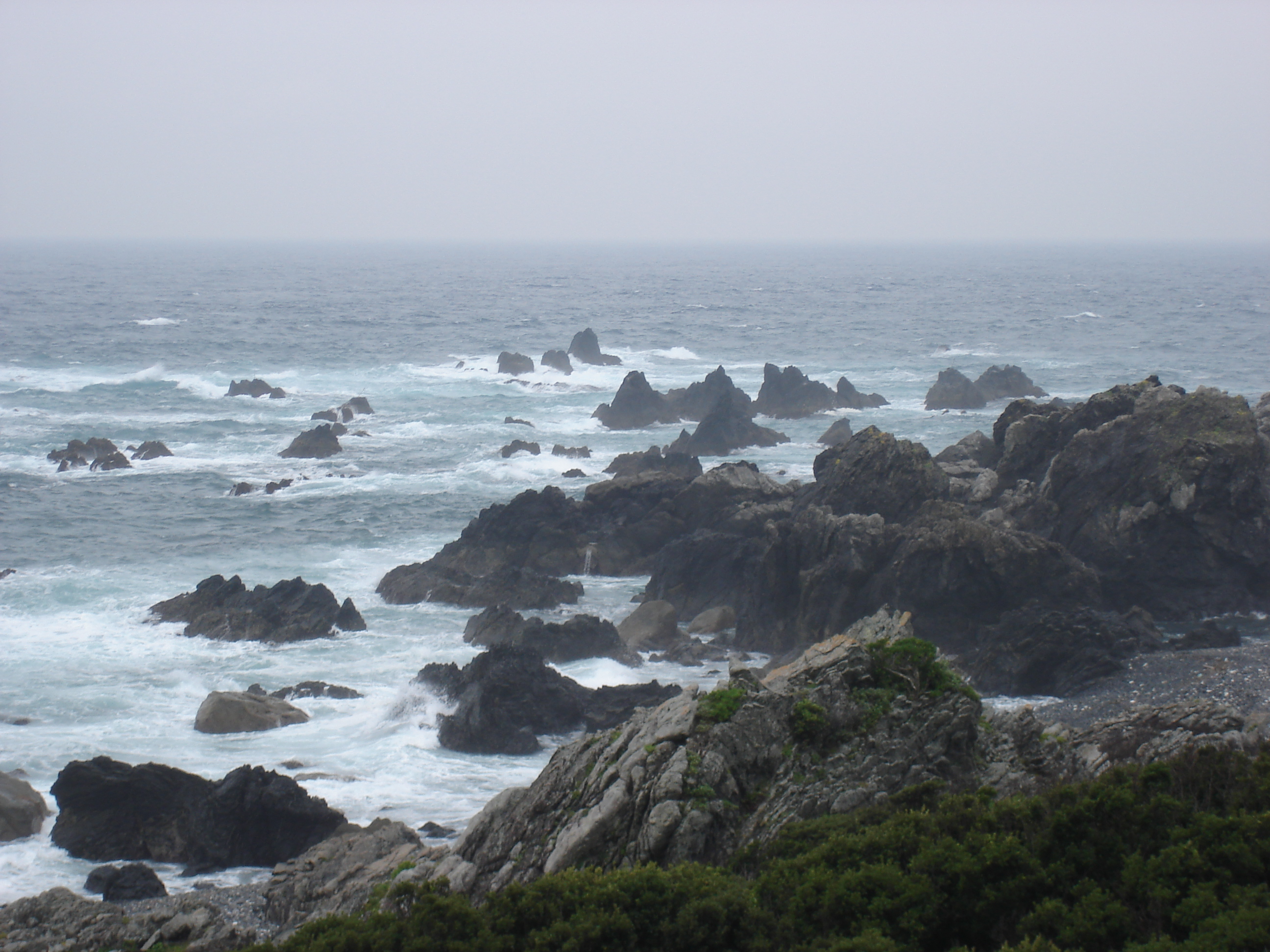
Muroto-Anan Kaigan Quasi-National Park

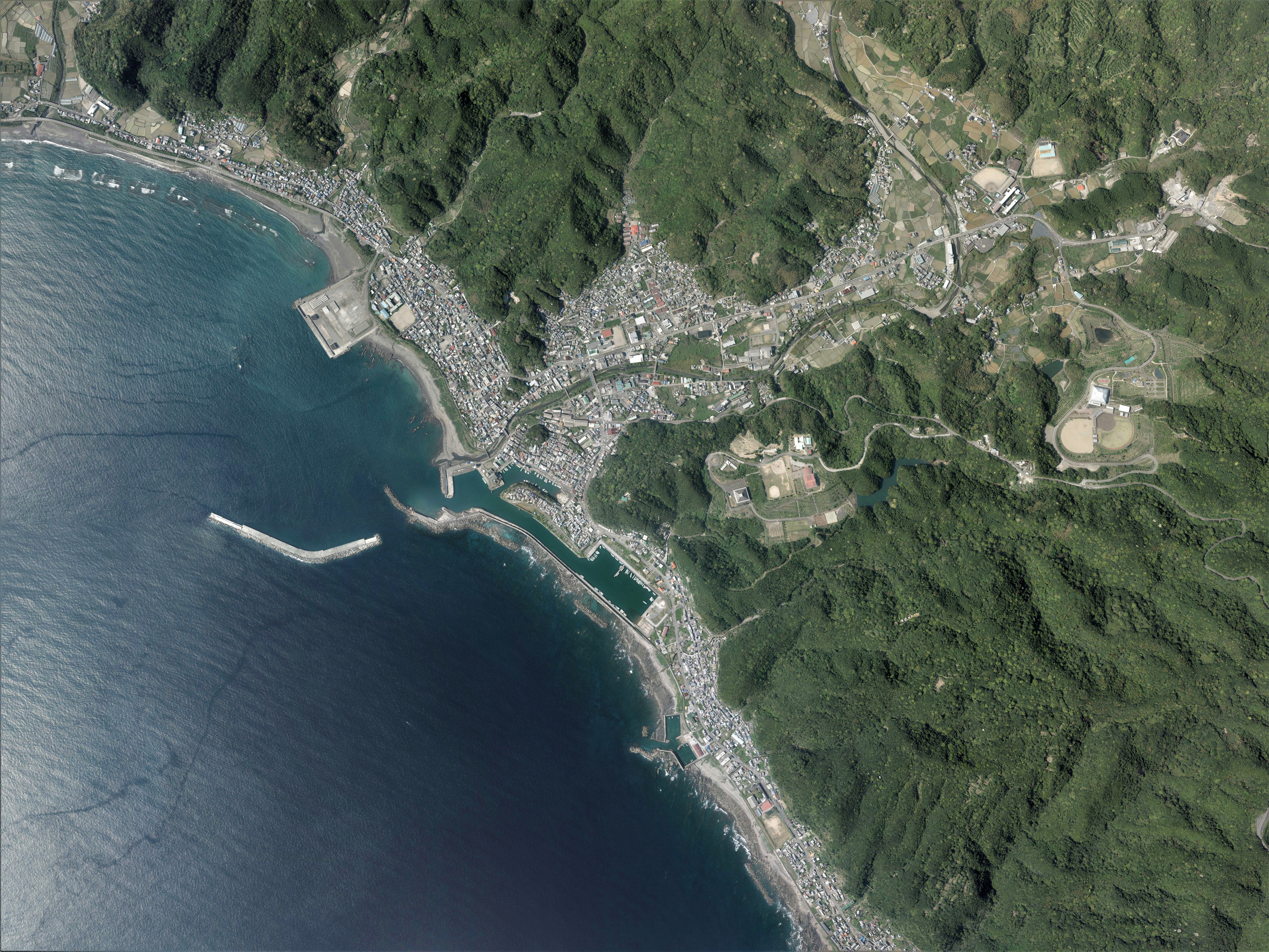
Muroto city center aerial photograph

Muroto (室戸市, Muroto-shi) is a city located in Kōchi Prefecture, Japan. As of 31 January 2024, the city had an estimated population of 11,633 in 6906 households and a population density of 47 persons per km^{2}. The total area of the city is 248.18 square kilometres (95.82 sq mi).

== Geography ==
Muroto is located in the southeastern tip of Kōchi Prefecture on the island of Shikoku. It occupies Cape Muroto which juts out into the Pacific Ocean. Parts of the city are within the borders of the Muroto-Anan Kaigan Quasi-National Park. The entire territory of Muroto is "Muroto Global Geopark" which is a member of the Japanese Geoparks Network and Global Geoparks Network since 2011 on account of its outstanding geological heritage, educational programs and projects, and promotion of geotourism.

=== Geology ===
Cape Muroto is made up of Oligocene to Pleistocene-aged sedimentary rocks and loose Holocene-aged alluvial deposits. The rocks belong to the Shimanto Supergroup, represented in the peninsula as mudstone, and the Tonohama Group made up of chiefly of sandstone and gravel. Several active, WNW-dipping, thrust faults are exposed at the western coast and southern tip of the peninsula. Off-shore west of the Cape Muroto, tip of the peninsula, there faults dips to the west.

There are uplifted marine terraces at Muroto. Dating of these terraces reveal that since their formation in an interval 123 to 96 thousand years ago (k B.P.), in an epoch corresponding to the Eemian interglacial. Since then land in the tip of the peninsula has risen 1.2–1.6 meters every thousand years (m/kyr). Closer to the mainland the uplift rate has been in the order of 0.3–0.7 m/kyr. While these are long-term averages individual large non-megathrust earthquakes are known to have uplifted the coast around one meter. These earthquakes are more rare than megathrust ones occurring every 1000 to 2000 years. Uplift of the coast has left fossil tube worm colonies attached to rocks on land.

=== Neighbouring municipalities ===
Kōchi Prefecture

- Kitagawa
- Nahari
- Tōyō

=== Climate ===
Muroto has a humid subtropical climate (Köppen climate classification Cfa) with hot, humid summers and cool winters. There is significant precipitation throughout the year, especially during June and July. The average annual temperature in Muroto is 16.9 °C (62.4 °F). The average annual rainfall is 2,465.0 mm (97.05 in) with June as the wettest month. The temperatures are highest on average in August, at around 26.3 °C (79.3 °F), and lowest in January, at around 7.7 °C (45.9 °F). The highest temperature ever recorded in Muroto was 35.0 °C (95.0 °F) on 30 July 1942; the coldest temperature ever recorded was −6.6 °C (20.1 °F) on 26 February 1981.

Climate data for Cape Muroto, Muroto (1991−2020 normals, extremes 1920−present)
Month	Jan	Feb	Mar	Apr	May	Jun	Jul	Aug	Sep	Oct	Nov	Dec	Year
Record high °C (°F)	20.8 (69.4)	21.1 (70.0)	23.1 (73.6)	25.8 (78.4)	28.2 (82.8)	30.1 (86.2)	35.0 (95.0)	34.5 (94.1)	32.9 (91.2)	29.5 (85.1)	26.4 (79.5)	22.0 (71.6)	35.0 (95.0)
Mean maximum °C (°F)	16.1 (61.0)	17.5 (63.5)	19.4 (66.9)	22.4 (72.3)	25.2 (77.4)	27.4 (81.3)	30.6 (87.1)	31.3 (88.3)	29.9 (85.8)	26.4 (79.5)	22.5 (72.5)	18.6 (65.5)	31.6 (88.9)
Mean daily maximum °C (°F)	10.6 (51.1)	11.4 (52.5)	14.3 (57.7)	18.2 (64.8)	21.7 (71.1)	23.9 (75.0)	27.6 (81.7)	29.0 (84.2)	26.5 (79.7)	22.2 (72.0)	17.7 (63.9)	13.0 (55.4)	19.7 (67.4)
Daily mean °C (°F)	7.7 (45.9)	8.2 (46.8)	11.0 (51.8)	15.2 (59.4)	18.8 (65.8)	21.5 (70.7)	25.0 (77.0)	26.3 (79.3)	24.0 (75.2)	19.8 (67.6)	15.1 (59.2)	10.2 (50.4)	16.9 (62.4)
Mean daily minimum °C (°F)	5.1 (41.2)	5.4 (41.7)	8.1 (46.6)	12.5 (54.5)	16.5 (61.7)	19.6 (67.3)	23.2 (73.8)	24.4 (75.9)	22.0 (71.6)	17.6 (63.7)	12.7 (54.9)	7.7 (45.9)	14.6 (58.2)
Mean minimum °C (°F)	−0.1 (31.8)	0.4 (32.7)	2.2 (36.0)	6.3 (43.3)	12.6 (54.7)	16.1 (61.0)	20.1 (68.2)	21.5 (70.7)	18.0 (64.4)	12.7 (54.9)	6.9 (44.4)	2.0 (35.6)	−1.0 (30.2)
Record low °C (°F)	−5.4 (22.3)	−6.6 (20.1)	−3.5 (25.7)	2.2 (36.0)	7.1 (44.8)	12.6 (54.7)	16.5 (61.7)	17.9 (64.2)	14.4 (57.9)	6.8 (44.2)	1.8 (35.2)	−2.1 (28.2)	−6.6 (20.1)
Average precipitation mm (inches)	89.5 (3.52)	113.8 (4.48)	177.4 (6.98)	203.2 (8.00)	240.6 (9.47)	330.8 (13.02)	267.9 (10.55)	210.2 (8.28)	322.3 (12.69)	251.8 (9.91)	164.3 (6.47)	93.3 (3.67)	2,465 (97.05)
Average snowfall cm (inches)	0 (0)	0 (0)	0 (0)	0 (0)	0 (0)	0 (0)	0 (0)	0 (0)	0 (0)	0 (0)	0 (0)	0 (0)	0 (0)
Average precipitation days (≥ 1.0 mm)	6.5	7.6	10.6	10.1	10.6	13.9	11.1	10.9	11.9	10.0	8.0	6.1	117.3
Average snowy days (≥ 1 cm)	0	0	0	0	0	0	0	0	0	0	0	0	0
Average relative humidity (%)	61	63	67	71	78	87	89	86	80	72	68	63	74
Mean monthly sunshine hours	179.0	172.1	194.7	199.7	196.1	132.3	177.8	227.9	171.2	178.5	169.3	180.4	2,178.9
Source: Japan Meteorological Agency

== Demographics ==
Per Japanese census data, the population of Muroto in 2020 is 11,742 people. Muroto has been conducting censuses since 1920.

Historical population
Year	Pop.	±%
1920	22,207	—
1925	23,851	+7.4%
1930	26,103	+9.4%
1935	25,967	−0.5%
1940	25,081	−3.4%
1945	30,227	+20.5%
1950	32,667	+8.1%
1955	32,878	+0.6%
1960	30,498	−7.2%
1965	28,746	−5.7%
1970	27,445	−4.5%
1975	26,660	−2.9%
1980	26,086	−2.2%
1985	25,309	−3.0%
1990	23,308	−7.9%
1995	21,430	−8.1%
2000	19,472	−9.1%
2005	17,490	−10.2%
2010	15,210	−13.0%
2015	13,524	−11.1%
2020	11,742	−13.2%
Muroto population statistics

== History ==
As with all of Kōchi Prefecture, the area of Muroto was part of ancient Tosa Province. During the Edo period, the area was part of the holdings of Tosa Domain ruled by the Yamauchi clan from their seat at Kōchi Castle. Following the Meiji restoration, the village of Muroto was established within Aki District, Kōchi with the creation of the modern municipalities system on October 1, 1889. In 1934, a typhoon caused tremendous devastation, killing 3,000 people. Muroto merged with the towns of Murotomisaki, Kiragawa, Sakihama and Hane and was elevated to city status on March 1, 1951.

== Government ==
Muroto has a mayor-council form of government with a directly elected mayor and a unicameral city council of 12 members. Muroto, together with the town of Tōyō, contributes one member to the Kōchi Prefectural Assembly. In terms of national politics, the city is part of Kōchi 1st district of the lower house of the Diet of Japan.

== Economy ==
Commercial fishing dominates the local economy of Muroto. The city is suffering from depopulation due to the decline of the fishery industry.

== Education ==
Muroto has five public elementary schools and four public middle schools operated by the city government and one public middle school operated by the Kōchi Prefectural Department of Education.

== Transportation ==
=== Railway ===
Muroto has no passenger railway service. The nearest train station is Nahari Station on the Tosa Kuroshio Railways Asa Line. Plans to extend the line from Nahari to Muroto have been floated since 1971, but no action has been taken.

=== Highways ===
- National Route 55

== Local attractions ==
- Cape Muroto
- Hotsumisaki-ji, 24th temple on the Shikoku Pilgrimage
- Kongōchō-ji, 26th temple on the Shikoku Pilgrimage
- Shinshō-ji, 25th temple on the Shikoku Pilgrimage
