= Kōryaku =

Period of Japanese history (1379–1381)

Kōryaku (康暦) was a Japanese era name (年号, nengō, lit. year name) of the Northern Court during the Era of Northern and Southern Courts after Eiwa and before Eitoku. This period spanned the years from March 1379 through February 1381. The emperor in Kyoto was Emperor Go-En'yū (後円融天皇, Go-En'yū-tennō). The Southern Court rival in Yoshino during this timeframe was Emperor Chōkei (長慶天皇, Chōkei-tennō).

== Nanboku-chō overview ==
The Imperial seats during the Nanboku-chō period were in relatively close proximity, but geographically distinct. They were conventionally identified as: Northern capital : Kyoto; Southern capital : Yoshino.

During the Meiji period, an Imperial decree dated March 3, 1911 established that the legitimate reigning monarchs of this period were the direct descendants of Emperor Go-Daigo through Emperor Go-Murakami, whose Southern Court (南朝, nanchō) had been established in exile in Yoshino, near Nara.

Until the end of the Edo period, the militarily superior pretender-Emperors supported by the Ashikaga shogunate had been mistakenly incorporated in Imperial chronologies despite the undisputed fact that the Imperial Regalia were not in their possession.

This illegitimate Northern Court (北朝, hokuchō) had been established in Kyoto by Ashikaga Takauji.

== Change of era ==
- 1379, also called Kōryaku gannen (康暦元年): The new era name was created to mark an event or series of events. The previous era ended and the new one commenced in Eiwa 5.

In this timeframe, Tenju (1375–1381) was the Southern Court equivalent nengō.

== Events of the Kōryaku era ==
- 1379 (Kōryaku 2): Shiba Yoshimasa becomes Kanrei.
- 1380 (Kōryaku 3): Kusunoki Masanori rejoins Kameyama; southern army suffers reverses.
- July 26, 1380 (Kōryaku 2, 24th day of the 6th month): The former Emperor Kōmyō died at age 60.

== Notes ==
Preceded by Eiwa	Era or nengō Kōryaku; 1379–1381	Succeeded by Eitoku
