= Kusunoki Masaie =

Kusunoki Masaie (楠木 正家; died 1348) was a samurai leader of Japan's Nanboku-chō period who fought for Emperor Go-Daigo against the Kamakura shogunate.

Masaie took command of the Kusunoki family's forces when Kusunoki Masashige was killed at the 1336 battle of Minatogawa. Masaie then repaired for a time to Hitachi province, where he was attacked by forces of the Ashikaga Northern Court. He fought them off, and killed two Northern generals, Satake Yoshifuyu and Gotō Motoaki. Masaie then traveled to Kyoto alongside Kitabatake Akiie, another major general of the Southern Court.

In 1347, Masashige's son Kusunoki Masatsura came of age and took command of his father's forces. Masaie willingly relinquished command, and served under Masatsura until their deaths the following year at the battle of Shijō Nawate.
