= Kubizuka =

Japanese burial mound

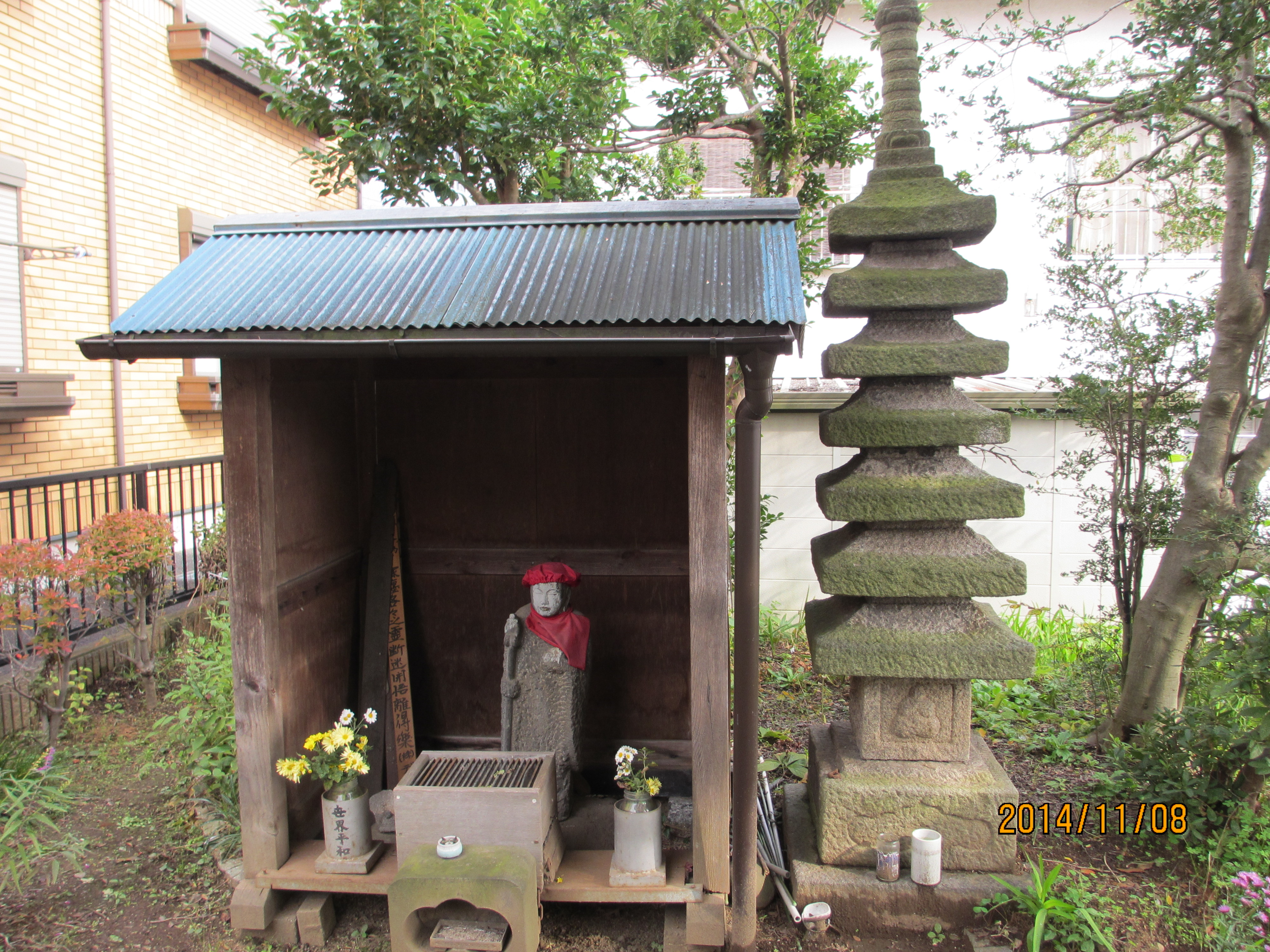

Kubizuka (首塚, literally neck mound in Japanese, often translated as head tomb) is a type of burial mound in Japan, in which severed heads are interred. The heads were often those taken as trophies following a battle or in some cases, the kubizuka holds the heads of those who were executed by decapitation, whether prisoners of war or convicted criminals who were sentenced to death. The dedicated grave is meant to put the souls to rest.

In Japanese history, battles were often followed by a head-viewing ceremony, in which warriors presented the head(s) of opponents they had killed in combat to their commander. The head of the deceased warrior was identified, and a record was kept of who had killed whom. To console the souls of the defeated, many kubizuka were built.

There are kubizuka enshrining a single person (like an enemy samurai commander), so they do not become a vengeful onryō later, and kubizuka enshrining many soldiers (zohyo) killed in one battle, such as the grave associated with the Battle of Sekigahara. A great number of both types of kubizuka still exist throughout Japan.

== Related subjects ==
Mimizuka (耳塚, ear mound, an alteration of the original hanazuka 鼻塚, nose mound ) is a tomb where the noses of the killed Korean and Chinese soldiers and civilians in the Japanese invasions of Korea (1592–1598) were gathered and buried as the substitute of heads, because it was impossible to bring back the severed heads from overseas; it has the same symbolic meaning as kubizuka. It is located near the front of present-day Toyokuni Shrine (Kyoto), and originally was in front of the gate of Hoko-ji Temple in Higashiyama Ward in Kyoto.

== Kubizuka across Japan ==
- Kubizuka of Akechi Mitsuhide: located at the side of Mochitora confectionery shop at Sanjo-Sagaru (to the south of Sanjo), Shirakawa-dori Street, Kyoto.
- Kubizuka of Amakusa Shirō, (also being referred to as Senninzuka – memorial mound of 1000 people): located at the ruins of Hara Castle in Kami-Amakusa, Kumamoto Prefecture
- Kubizuka of Asari Katsuyori: located at Hiyama, Noshiro, Akita.
- Kubizuka of Ashikaga Yoshinori: Shinjo Ankokuji Temple, Katō, Hyōgo.
- Kubizuka of Bessho Nagaharu: Miki, Hyōgo.
- Kubizuka for the dead in the Battle of Kawanakajima: two Kubizuka inside and one outside of the Hachimanpara historic park, Nagano.
- Kubizuka of Kiso Yoshinaka: located at Yasaka-no-to Pagoda, Yasui Higashiyama, Kyoto.
- Kubizuka of Kusunoki Masashige: Teramoto Kanshinji Temple, Kawachinagano, Osaka Prefecture.
- Kubizuka for the dead in the Battle of Komaki and Nagakute: located at Yazako, Nagakute, Aichi Prefecture.
- Kubizuka of Kondō Isami: located at Hozo-ji Temple, Motojuku, Okazaki, Aichi.
- Kubizuka of Soga no Iruka: located at Asuka, Nara.
- Kubizuka of Taira no Masakado: located at Ōtemachi, Chiyoda, Tokyo.
- Kubizuka of Nitta Yoshisada: Sagano Takiguchi-dera, Kyoto
- Kubizuka of Matsudaira Nobuyasu: located at Moriguro, Asahi-cho, Okazaki City, Aichi Prefecture.
- Oni Kubizuka: located along National Route 21, Oniiwa Park, Mitake, Gifu.
- Kubizuka of Munenaga Yamaguchi: Daishoji Shincho, Kaga City, Ishikawa Prefecture.
- Kubizuka of Christian martyrs of the Kori Debacle in 1657: In front of Haraguchimachi Community Center, Ōmura, Nagasaki.
