= Kusunoki Masanori =

Samurai (1333–1390)

Kusunoki Masanori 楠木 正儀
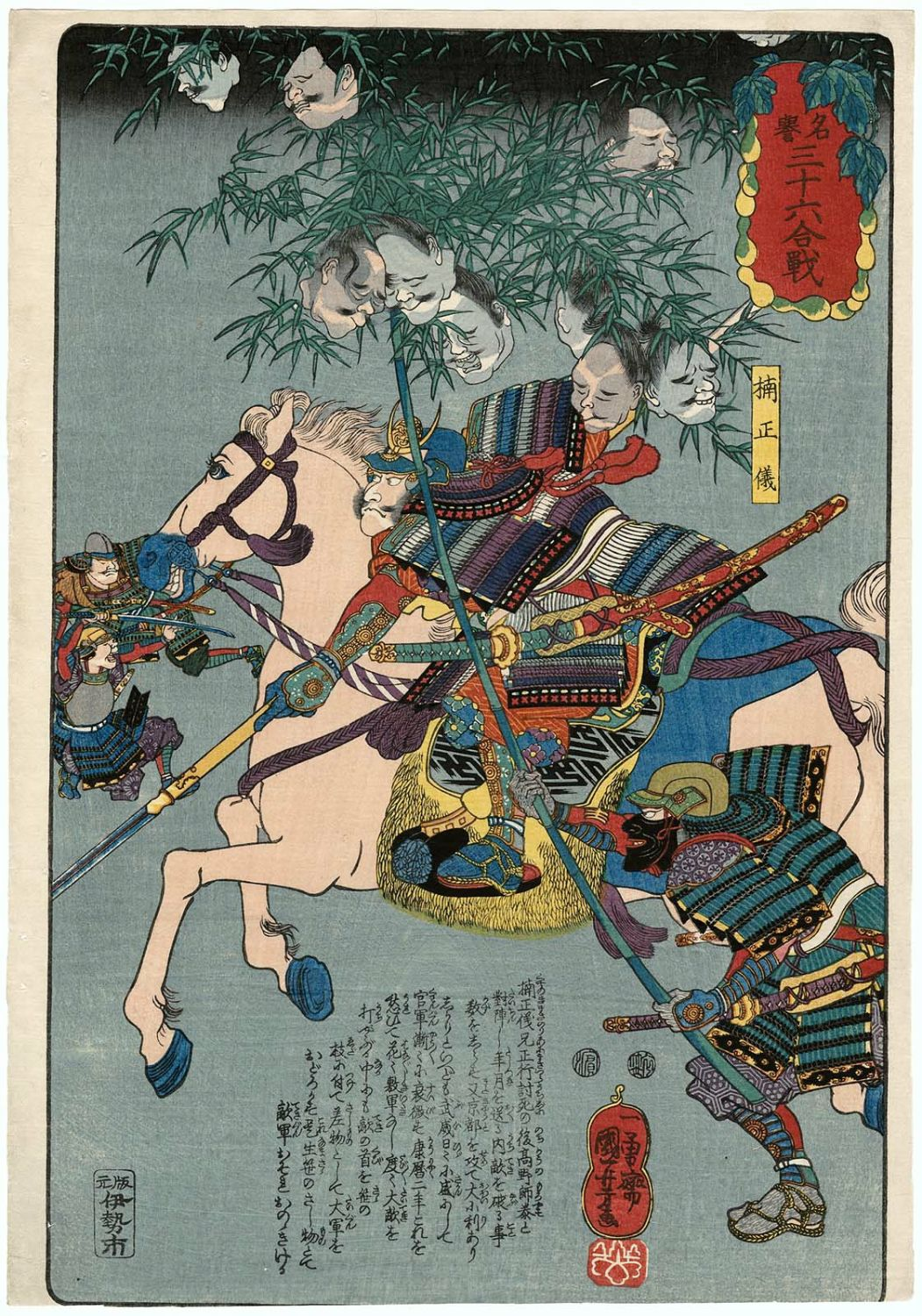
- In Meiyo Sanjūroggassen by Utagawa Kuniyoshi
- Born: 1333
- Died: 1390 (aged 56–57)
- Occupation: samurai

Kusunoki Masanori (楠木 正儀; 1333 – 1390) was a samurai who fought for the Southern Court in Japan's Nanboku-chō Wars, and is famed for his skills as a leader and military strategist, though he later sought a diplomatic solution and was regarded a traitor by many of his comrades. He was the brother of Kusunoki Masatsura and Kusunoki Masatoki, and son of Kusunoki Masashige.

== Military career ==
Alongside his brother Masatsura, Nitta Yoshisada and a number of other great generals, he battled the Ashikaga forces in Kamakura, and a number of other occasions, including the defense of Kyoto; he also headed for a time the loyalist base at Tōjō in Kawachi province.

Following the death of his brothers at the 1348 battle of Shijōnawate, Masanori continued to oppose the armies of the Northern Court, Ashikaga clan pretenders to the throne. In 1352, he helped lead Loyalist forces in the capture of Kyoto.

In 1353, as Yamana Tokiuji, a recent convert to the loyalist cause, approached the capital, Masanori led a force to seize certain neighboring areas such as Tennōji and Yahata, while other forces mobilized in other directions. In July of that year, he pressed north from Yahata, towards Kyoto, burning towns as he went, while Yamana approached from Nishiyama to the west of the city. Though they managed to seize the capital, Shōgun Ashikaga Yoshiakira escaped, and the loyalists were driven from the city the following month. Regrouping and continuing the war, Masanori fought Yoshiakira again two years later, at Kaminami, just west of Yamazaki, where both sides suffered heavy losses, and Masanori and Yamana were eventually forced to retreat.

Several years later, Masanori defended the fortress at Akasaka, his father's birthplace, but ultimately withdrew; the fact that he was not pursued, and that the Northern Court army did not engage in further actions in the nearby areas immediately afterwards is noted as strange by George Bailey Sansom, but he offers no explanation.

In 1369, after taking Kyoto and being forced out for the fourth time, Masanori gave up, and sought a diplomatic solution; however, despite the looming defeat of the Southern Court, his allies behaved in the negotiations as though they had the upper hand, and the shogunate (the Northern Court) was suing for peace. As a result, the shogunate representatives quickly grew impatient and nonplussed, and rejected the negotiations outright. Considered a traitor by his family and Southern Court sympathizers at Court, Masanori continued along his path nevertheless, weary of battle and uncaring as to the opinions of those who had not laid their own lives on the line in battle year after year.

Peace agreements were reached soon afterwards, largely as a result of the mutual respect garnered by Masanori and Hosokawa Yoriyuki, a shogunate official, for one another. Though this peace would prove temporary and unstable, it marked the end of Masanori's time as a strategist and general.

Surviving documents in the Tannowa collection reveal that Kusunoki Masanori was left-handed.
