= Masaie =

- Gender: Male

Origin
- Origin: Japanese
- Meaning: Different meanings depending on the kanji used

Masaie (written: 正家 or 政家) is a masculine Japanese given name. Notable people with the name include:

- Konoe Masaie (近衛 政家) (1445–1505), Japanese kugyō
- Kusunoki Masaie (楠木 正家) (died 1348), Japanese samurai
- Natsuka Masaie (長束 正家) (1562–1600), Japanese daimyō
