= Kusunoki Masatoki =

Japanese samurai (d. 1348)

Kusunoki Masatoki (Japanese: 楠木 正時, died February 4, 1348) was a Japanese samurai lord during the Nanboku-chō period. He was second-in-command during the Battle of Shijōnawate, and died in battle in 1348, along with his older brother, Kusunoki Masatsura.

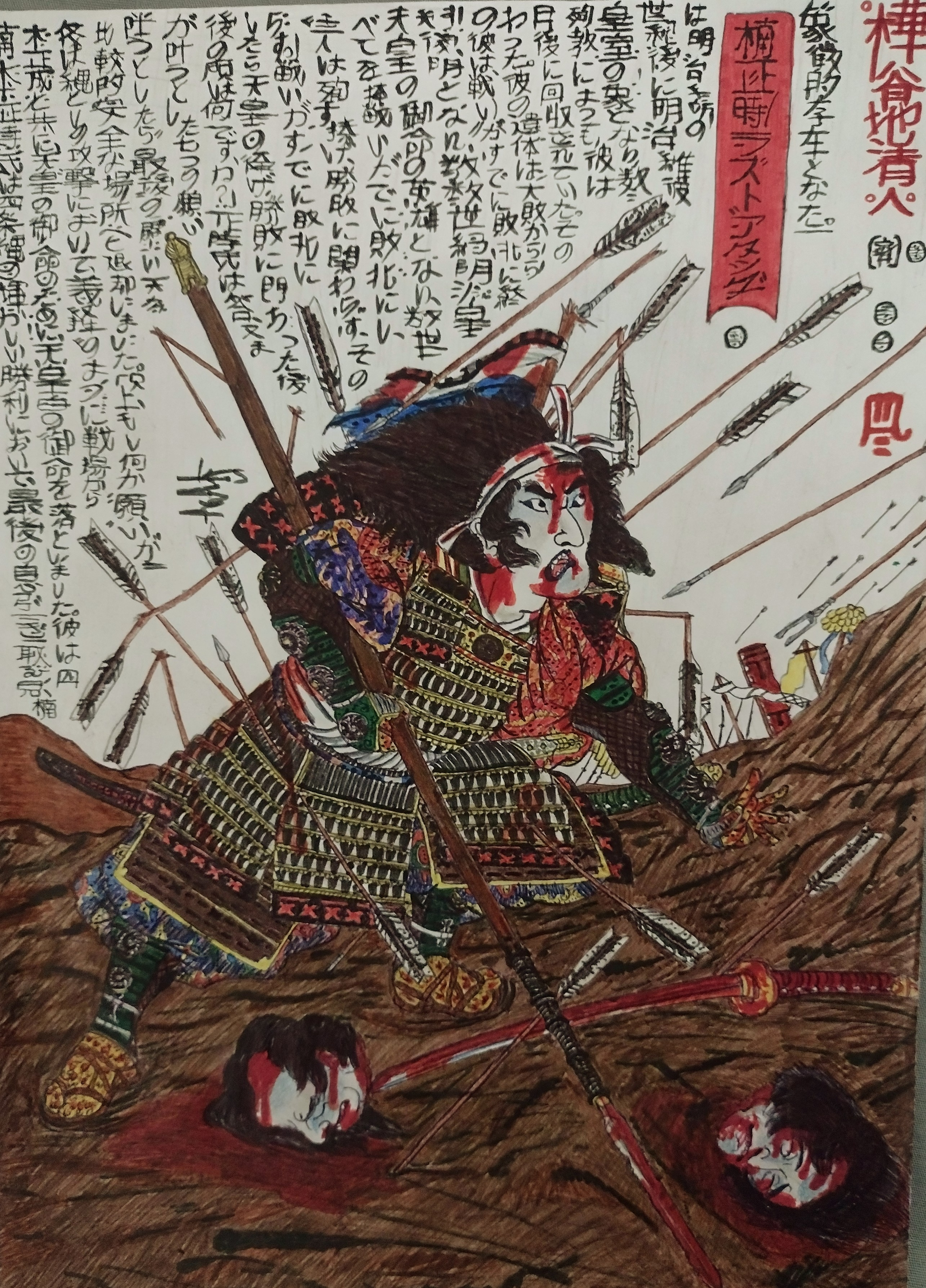
Kusonoki Masatoki in his final advance at the Battle of Shijonawate, Meiji era.

== Life ==
Masatoki was the second son of Kusunoki Masashige.

On February 4, 1348, the Battle of Shijōnawate began between Kusunoki Masatsura of the Southern Court and Kō no Moronao of the Northern Court. He died in the war with his elder brother, Masatsura. His imina name is unknown, but he is referred to as "Jirō".

This is all that is known about this person from the primary sources, and even his death age is unknown. As a secondary historical source written around his time, his imina name can be confirmed to be "Masatoki", according to Sonpi Bunmyaku by Tōin Kinsada.

In addition, in Kanshinji Bunsho, there are two letters dated 1349 and 1350, respectively. According to the documents of Kanshin-ji, these letters were written by Masatoki, but considering the dates, they are believed to have been written by his brother, Masanori.

In 1889, Shijonawate Shrine was established, and Masatoki became one of its worshiped deities. According to the shrine documents, he held the court rank of Senior Fourth Rank. However, it is unknown if this is historically accurate.
