= Minatogawa Shrine =

Shinto shrine in Hyōgo Prefecture, Japan

Minatogawa Shrine (湊川神社, Minatogawa-jinja)
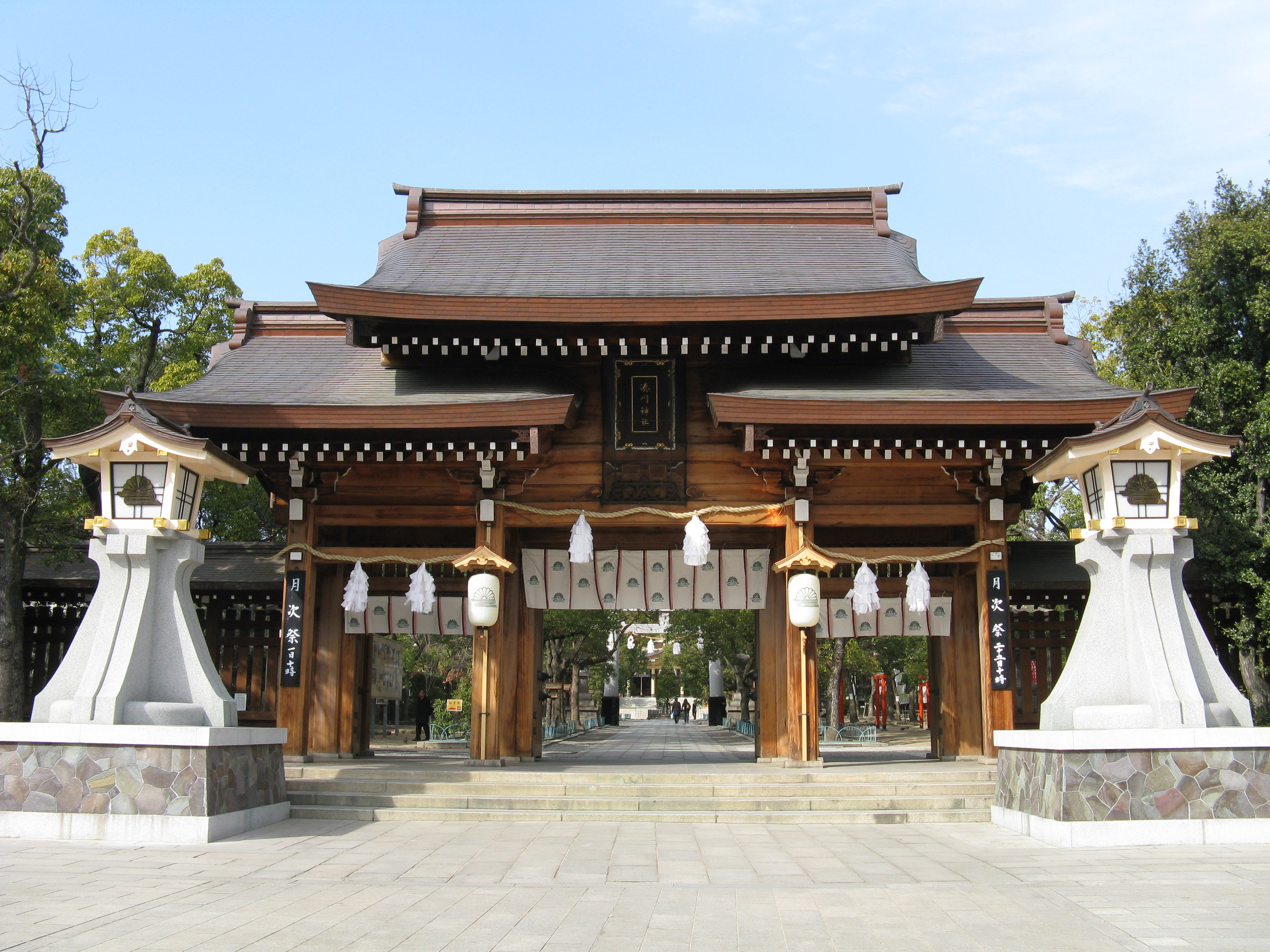
- Main gate.

- Location within Japan

Religion
- Affiliation: Shinto

Location
- Interactive map of Minatogawa Shrine (湊川神社, Minatogawa-jinja)
- Coordinates: 34.681°N 135.175°E

Architecture
- Established: 1872

Minatogawa Shrine (湊川神社, Minatogawa-jinja) is a Shinto shrine in Chūō-ku, Kobe, Japan, roughly on the site of the Battle of Minatogawa established in 1872.

The enshrined kami is the spirit of Masashige Kusunoki, a military commander. It is one of the Fifteen Shrines of the Kenmu Restoration.
