= Kusunoki Masasue =

Samurai warlord (died 1336)

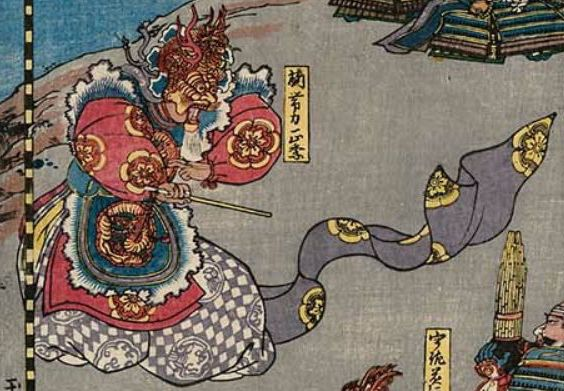
Kusunoki Tatewaki Masasue

Kusunoki Masasue (Japanese: 楠木正季, died July 5, 1336) was a samurai warlord during the Nanboku-chō period, and the younger brother of Kusunoki Masashige. He died alongside his brother as part of the Battle of Minatogawa on July 5, 1336. He is famous for his last words Shichishō Hōkoku! (七生報國; "Would that I had seven lives to give for my country!").

== Life ==
Relatively little is known about Masasue compared to his much more famous older brother. Masasue fought alongside his Masahige throughout the Kenmu campaigns, including at the sieges of Akasaka and Chihaya castles, but other than his name, almost nothing is recorded about him in historical chronicles until his death at the Battle of Minatogawa.

When Masashige was ordered by Emperor Go-Daigo to make a stand against the forces of Ashikaga Takauji at the Battle of Minatogawa in July 1336, Masasue went with him and perished in the battle. According to the war chronicle Taiheki, just before their deaths, Masashige turned to Masasue and said, "It is said that one's last thought in this life determines the goodness or evil of one's next incarnation. Into which of the nine levels of existence would you like to be reborn?" To which Masasue laughed and replied, "It is my wish to be reborn again and again for seven lives into this same existence in order to destroy the enemies of the court!" Masashige then expressed his agreement with this sentiment. This statement would later be encapsulated in the four-character slogan shichishō hōkoku (七生報國; "Would that I had seven lives to give for my country!").
