= Kanshin-ji =

Shingon temple in Kawachinagano, Osaka Prefecture, Japan

- 観心寺
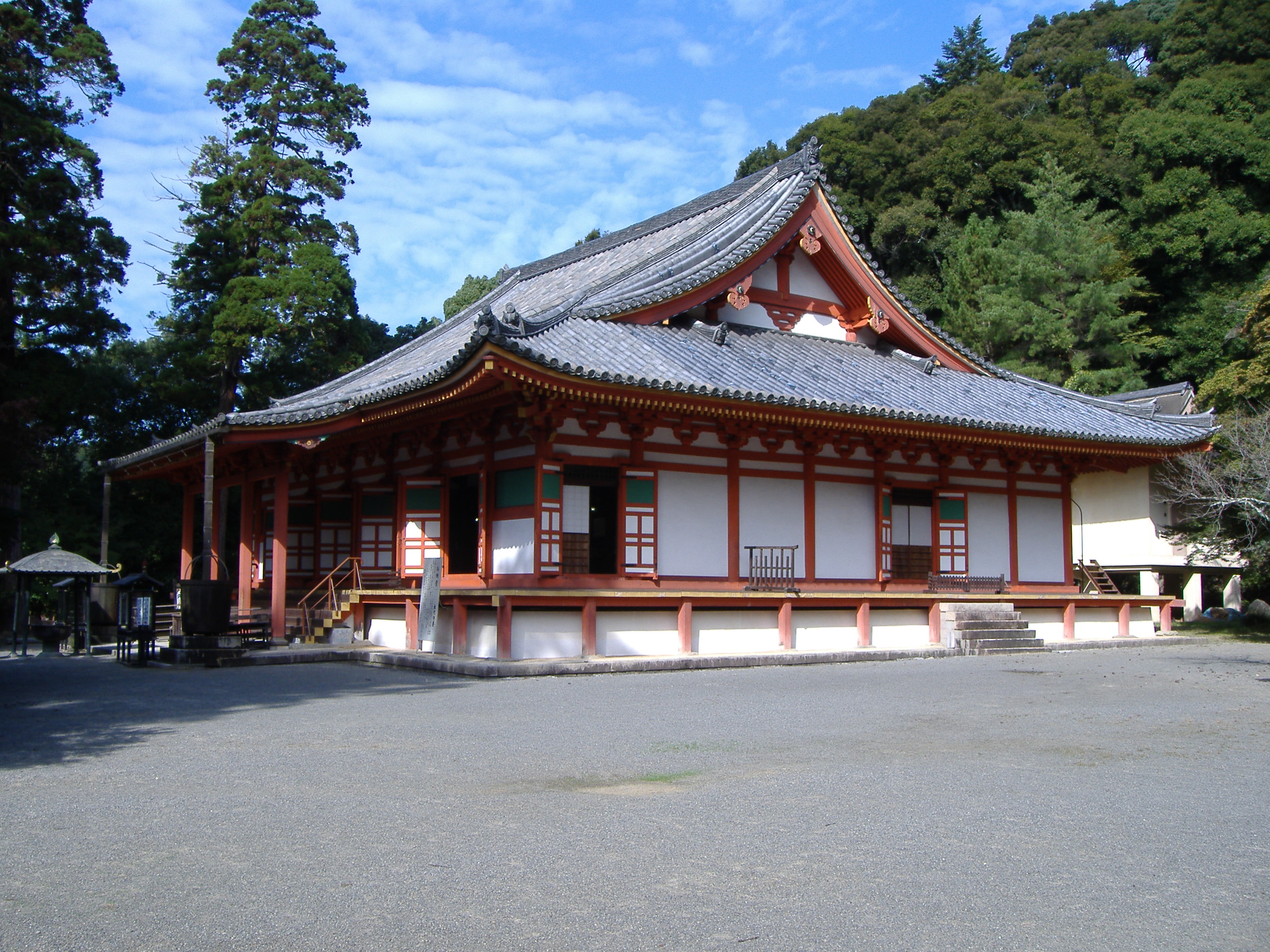
- Kanshin-ji Kondō

- Location within Osaka Prefecture Location within Japan

Religion
- Affiliation: Buddhist
- Deity: Nyoirin Kannon Bosatsu
- Rite: Shingon Buddhism
- Status: functional

Location
- Location: 475 Teramoto, Kawachinagano-shi, Osaka-fu
- Country: Japan
- Interactive map of Kanshin-ji
- Coordinates: 34°26′14.43″N 135°35′54.94″E

Architecture
- Founder: c.En no Gyōja, Kūkai
- Completed: Nara period

Website
- Official website
- National Treasure Important Cultural Property National Historic Site of Japan

Kanshin-ji (観心寺) is a Buddhist temple located in the Teramoto neighborhood of the city of Kawachinagano, Osaka Prefecture, in the Kansai region of Japan. It is one of the head temples of the Kōyasan Shingon-shū branch of Shingon Buddhism. The temple has several National Treasures and Important Cultural Properties. Its precincts were designated a National Historic Site in 1972. and a Japan Heritage site.

== History ==
According to tradition, En no Gyōja founded a temple called "Unshin-ji" in the year 701. Just over a century later, in 808, Kūkai visited this temple and initiated worship of the Big Dipper, building seven cairns corresponding to the seven main stars in that constellation, which still remain in the precincts to this day. Kanshin-ji is the only temple in Japan that enshrines the Big Dipper. Again per tradition, Kūkai returned to the temple in 815 and carved a statue of Nyoirin Kannon and renamed the temple "Kanshin-ji". While there are innumerable folklore references to Kūkai visiting some location and carving a statue with his own hands, the image attributed to Kūkai at this temple is stylized as a work of the 9th century and is accompanied by four gold and bronze Buddha statues also dating to the same period, so the Nara period origins of the temple are not disputed. Per the temple own illustrated history, the "Kanshinji Engimonocho", the temple was rebuilt by order of Emperor Junna in 827, with the work begun by Kūkai's chief disciple, Jichie (Doko Daishi) and continued by his own disciple Shinshō. By the Kamakura period, it was a very large temple with more than 50 subsidiary chapels.

Kanshin-ji was also the bodaiji for the Kusunoki clan, and thus had strong connections to the Southern Court during the Nanboku-chō period. In 1334, Emperor Go-Daigo built an imperial palace within the precincts of the temple, and from December 1359 to September 1360 it was the residence of Emperor Go-Murakami, whose grave is also within the precincts of the temple. The Tatekake-to chapel is a square one-story building, but is actually the first story of an unfinished Three-story pagoda. According to folklore, Kusunoki Masashige had the building constructed to pray for the success of the Kenmu Restoration, but was defeated and killed at the Battle of Minatogawa before the structure was completed. During the Muromachi period, the temple continued to prosper under the patronage of the Hatakeyama clan, but during the Sengoku period, Oda Nobunaga seized most of the temple's territory. The temple was rebuilt under Toyotomi Hideyoshi, and his son Toyotomi Hideyori restored the Main Hall and various structures. During the Edo period, the hatamoto Kainosho clan sponsored the temple and during the An'ei era (1772-1781), the temple had over 30 subsidiary chapels. However, this was reduced to only 12 by the Keiō era (1865-1868).

== Gallery ==
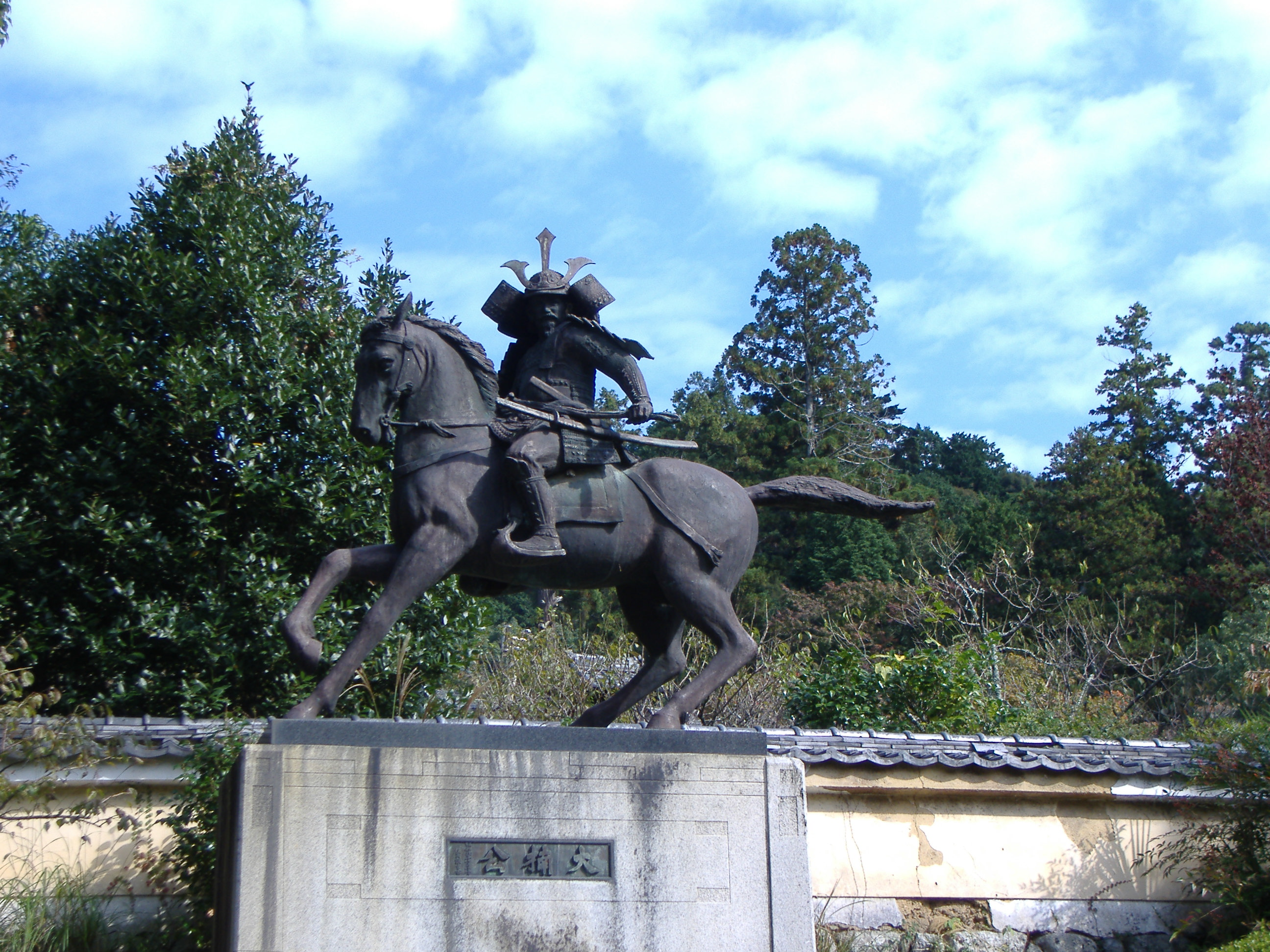
Kusunoki Masashige statue

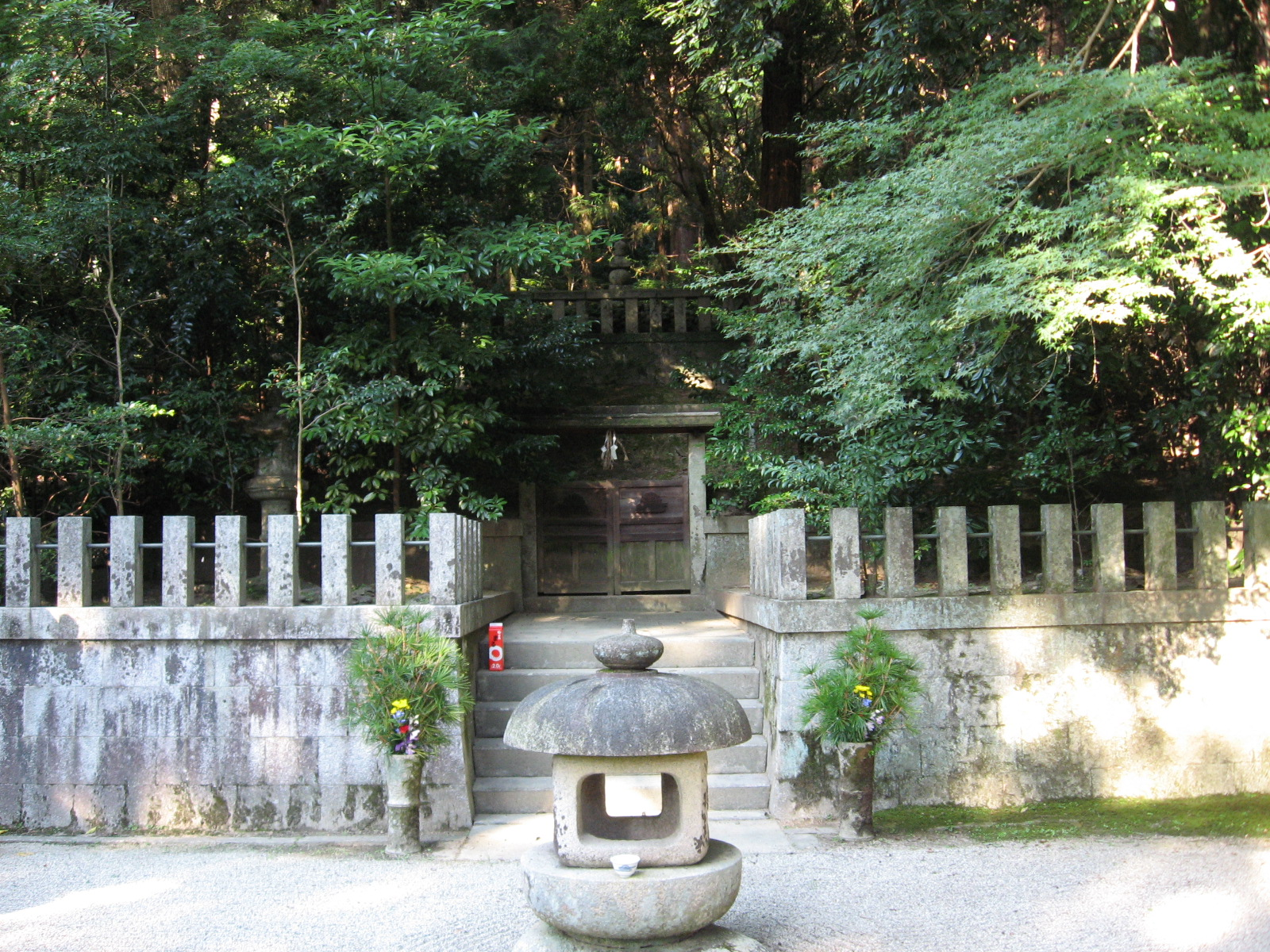
Kusunoki Masashige head mound

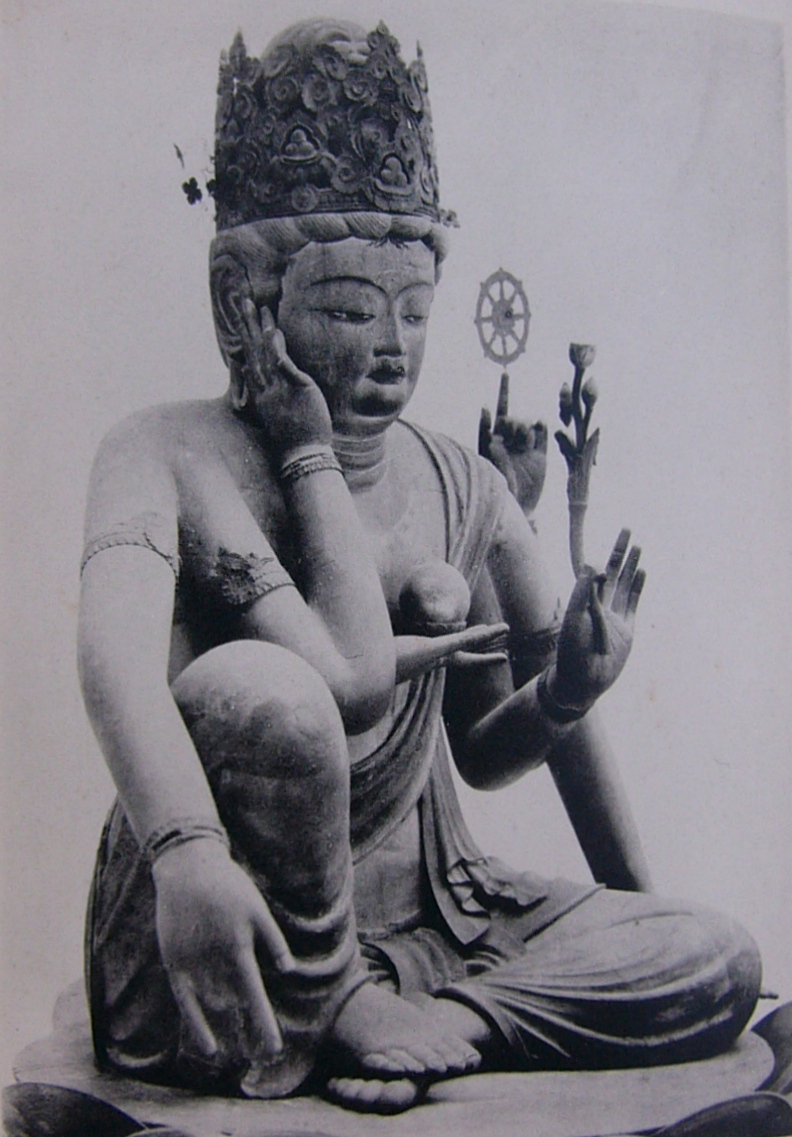
hozon Nyoirin Kannon Bosatsu

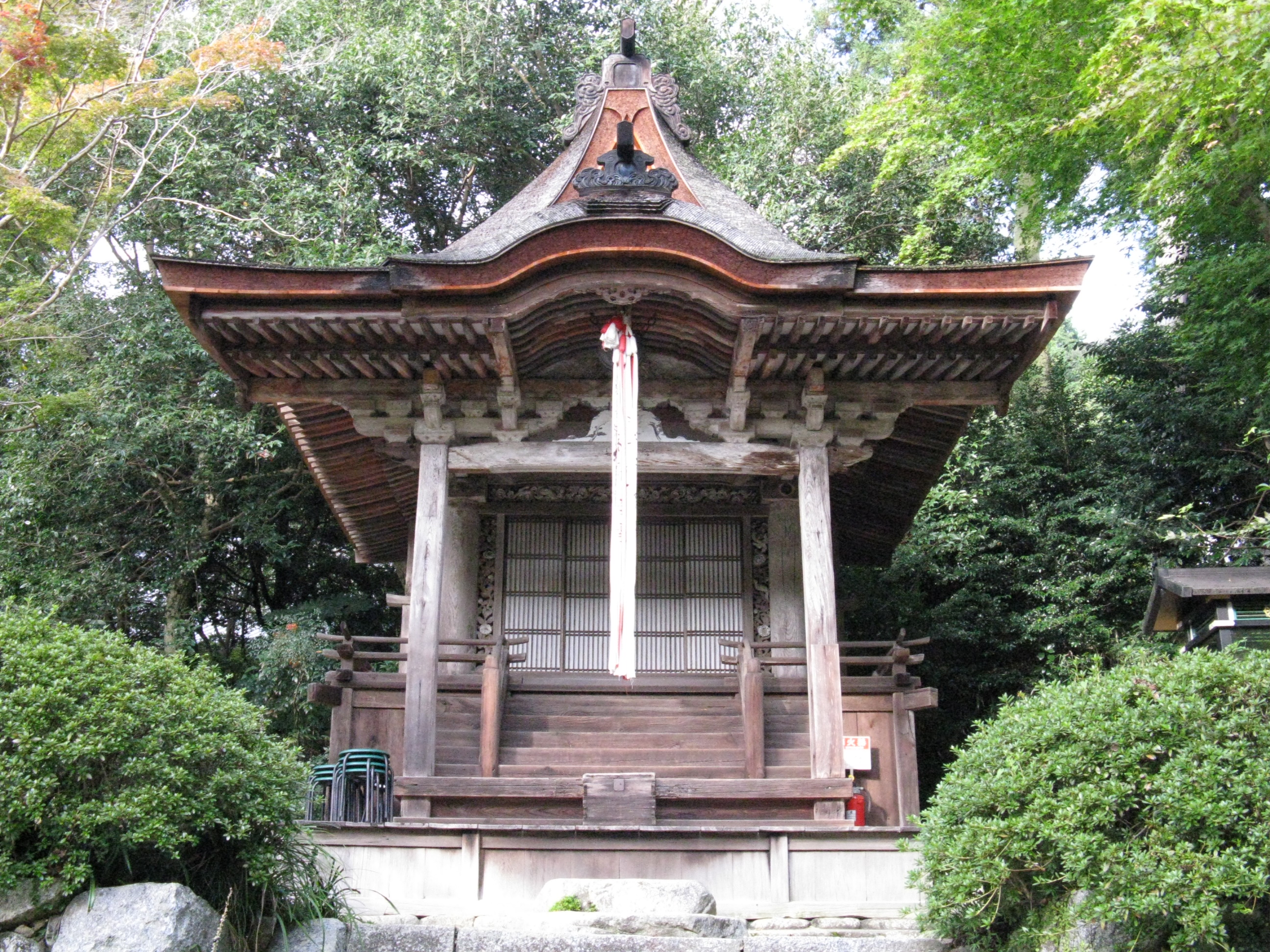
Kariteimoten-do

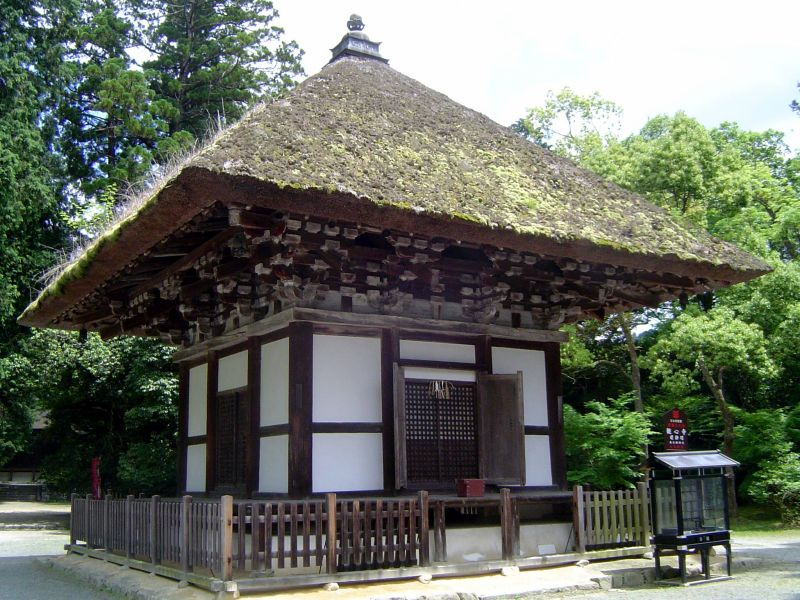
Tatekake-no-to

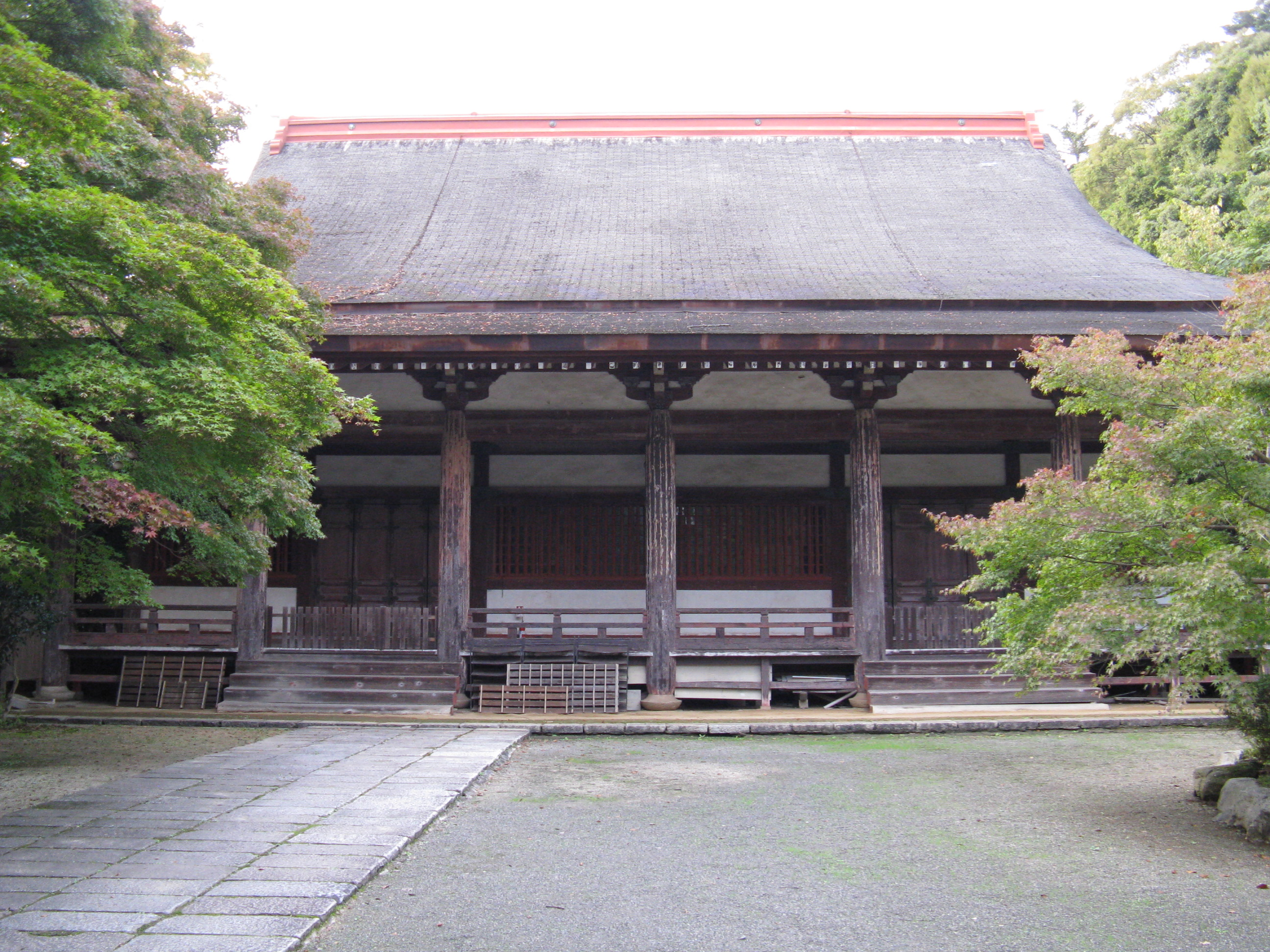
Onshiko-do

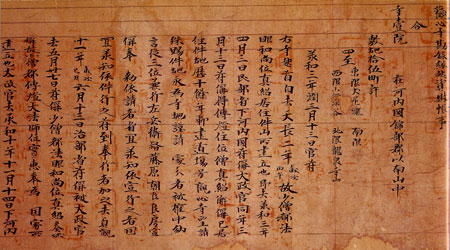
Inventory for Kanshinji

== Cultural Properties ==
=== National treasures ===
Kondō (金堂)

The Main Hall of Kanshin-ji was built at the beginning of the Muromachi period. However, its predecessor building seems to have been built during the Heian period, then rebuilt in its current form and has been repaired several times. Toyotomi Hideyori repaired it in 1613. The architectural style is an eclectic blend of traditional Japanese elements with elements of Zen architecture newly-arrived from China. It was designated a National Treasure in 1952.

Nyoirin Kannon (如意輪観音坐像)

The main image Nyoirin Kannon is a Kannon that is s of Kanshin-ji is a seated wooden statue of Nyoirin Kannon, dating from the Heian period.It is 109.4 cm high and was carved from a single block of Kyara incense wood. The statue is believed to have been carved in the Jōwa ra (834-848) under the patronage of the empress of Emperor Saga, Tachibana no Kachiko. It is a hibutsu hidden image and is open to public display only on April 17 and April 18 annually.

Kanshinji engi shizaichō (観心寺縁起資財帳)

The Kanshinji engi shizaichō is a document created during the Heian period and is dated 883 AD. It is extremely rare for a document written on paper to have survived in such good preservation. The document consists of two parts. The gives the reasons why Kanshin-ji was built and its early history. The second part is an inventory of the property that the temple had at that time.

=== Important Cultural Properties ===
==== Buildings and structures ====
- Shoin
- Tatekake-to
- Karitemoten-do
- Onshiko-do

==== Paintings ====
- Mahāpratisarā, painting on silk

==== Statues ====
- Kanzeon Bodhisattva, standing statue, gold and bronze statue (image height 33.3 cm)
- Kanzeon Bodhisattva, standing statue, gold and bronze (image height 18.3 cm)
- Shaka Nyorai, standing statue, gold and bronze (partial)
- Nyoirin Kannon, standing statue, gold and bronze (partial), (at Osaka City Museum of Fine Arts)
- Aizen Myoo, seated statue, wooden
- Fudo Myoo, seated statue, wooden
- Aizen Myoo, seated statue, wooden, in zushi (owned by Emperor Go-Murakami) (image height 6.2 cm)
- Nyoirin Kannon, seated statue, wooden
- Four heavenly kings, standing statues, wooden
- Shaka Nyorai, seated statue, wooden
- Yakushi Nyorai, seated statue, wooden
- Hosho Nyorai, seated statue, wooden
- Maitreya Bodhisattva, seated statue, wooden
- Sho-Kannon Bosatsu, standing statues (6), wooden (image height 166.5 cm, 167.0 cm 180.3 cm, 163.5 cm, 167.9 cm, 170.2 cm)
- Nyoirin Kannon, seated statue, wooden
- Jizo Bosatsu, standing statue, wooden
- Holy Monk, seated statue, wooden, in zushi

==== Crafts ====
- One pair of gold and bronze lotus vase (Kebyo)
- Iron lantern, Joei 2nd year inscription
- One set red breastplate armor, said to have belonged to Kusunoki Masashige

==== Documents ====
- Kanshinji Engi (Emperor Go-Kameyama's book, Emperor Go-Komatsu's book) Volume 2
- Chusonji Sutra (166 gold and silver sutras, 50 gold sutras) 216 volumes
- Kanshinji Documents (688) 29 volumes, 2 volumes, 360 copies

== See also ==
- List of Historic Sites of Japan (Osaka)
- List of National Treasures of Japan (temples)
- List of National Treasures of Japan (sculptures)
