= Mimizuka =

Memorial to sliced noses in Kyoto, Japan

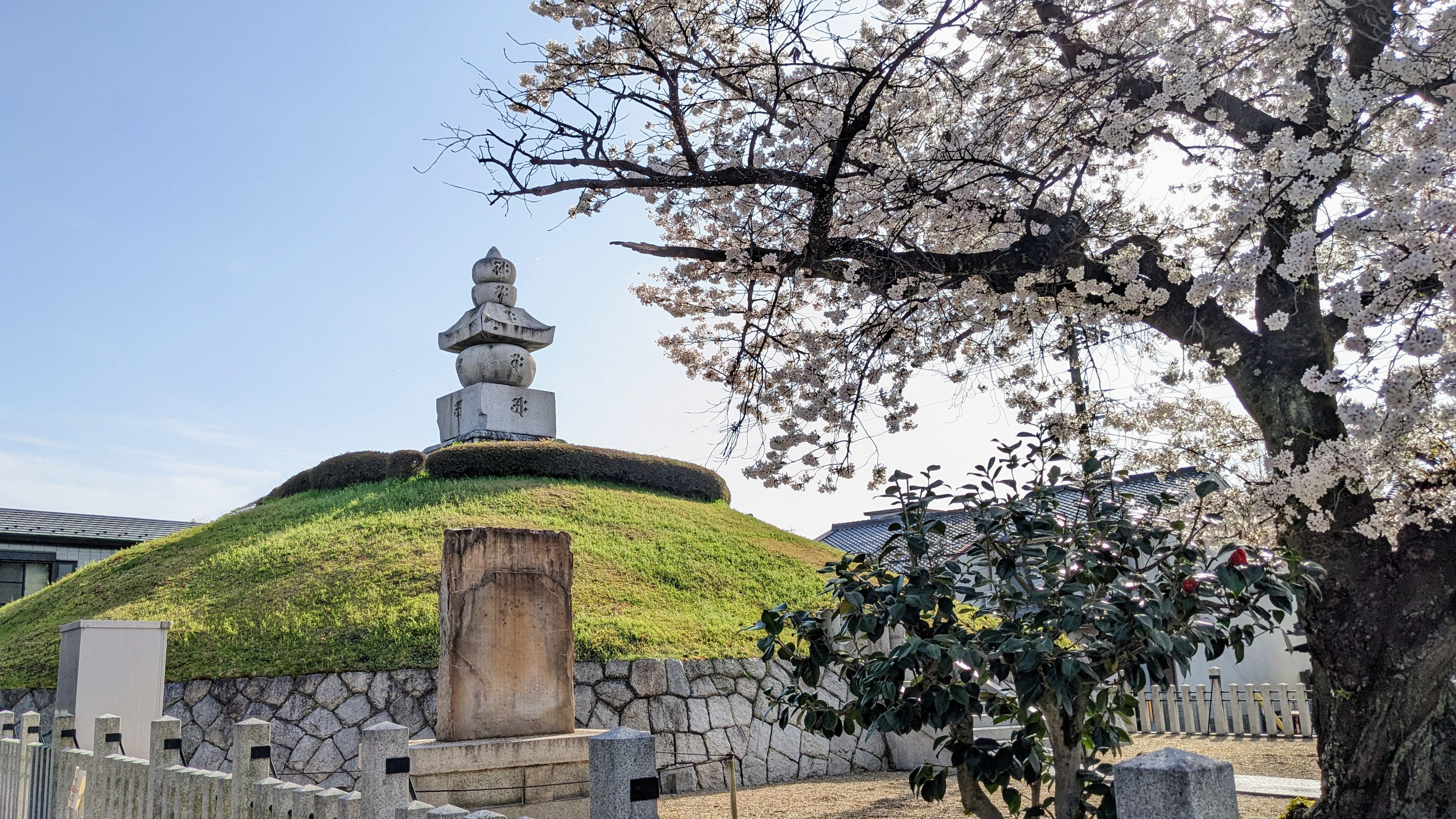
- Mimizuka from the side (2023)
- Interactive map of Mimizuka
- Location: 533-1 Chayacho, Higashiyama-ku, Kyoto, Japan
- Coordinates: 34°59′29″N 135°46′13″E
- Type: Nose tomb
- Opening date: September 28, 1597
- Dedicated to: The sliced noses of 38,000 Korean people and 30,000 Chinese people
- Website: www2.city.kyoto.lg.jp/somu/rekishi/fm/ishibumi/html/hi140.html (in Japanese)

The Mimizuka (耳塚; "Ear Mound" or "Ear Tomb"), which was renamed from Hanazuka (鼻塚; "Nose Mound"), is a monument in Kyoto, Japan. It is dedicated to the sliced noses of killed Korean soldiers and civilians, as well as those of Ming Chinese troops, taken as war trophies during the Imjin War. The monument enshrines the severed noses of at least 38,000 Koreans and over 30,000 Chinese killed during Toyotomi Hideyoshi's invasions.

The shrine is located just to the west of Toyokuni Shrine, the Shinto shrine honoring Hideyoshi in Kyoto.

== History ==
Traditionally, Japanese warriors brought back the heads of enemies slain on the battlefield as proof of their deeds. Nose collection in lieu of heads became a feature of the second Korean invasion. Originally, remuneration was paid to soldiers by their daimyō commanders based on the severed heads upon submission to collection stations, where inspectors meticulously counted, recorded, salted and packed the heads bound for Japan. However, because of the number of civilians killed along with soldiers, and crowded conditions on the ships that transported troops, it was far easier to just bring back noses instead of whole heads. Hideyoshi was especially insistent upon receiving noses of people his samurai had killed as proof that his men really were killing people in Korea.

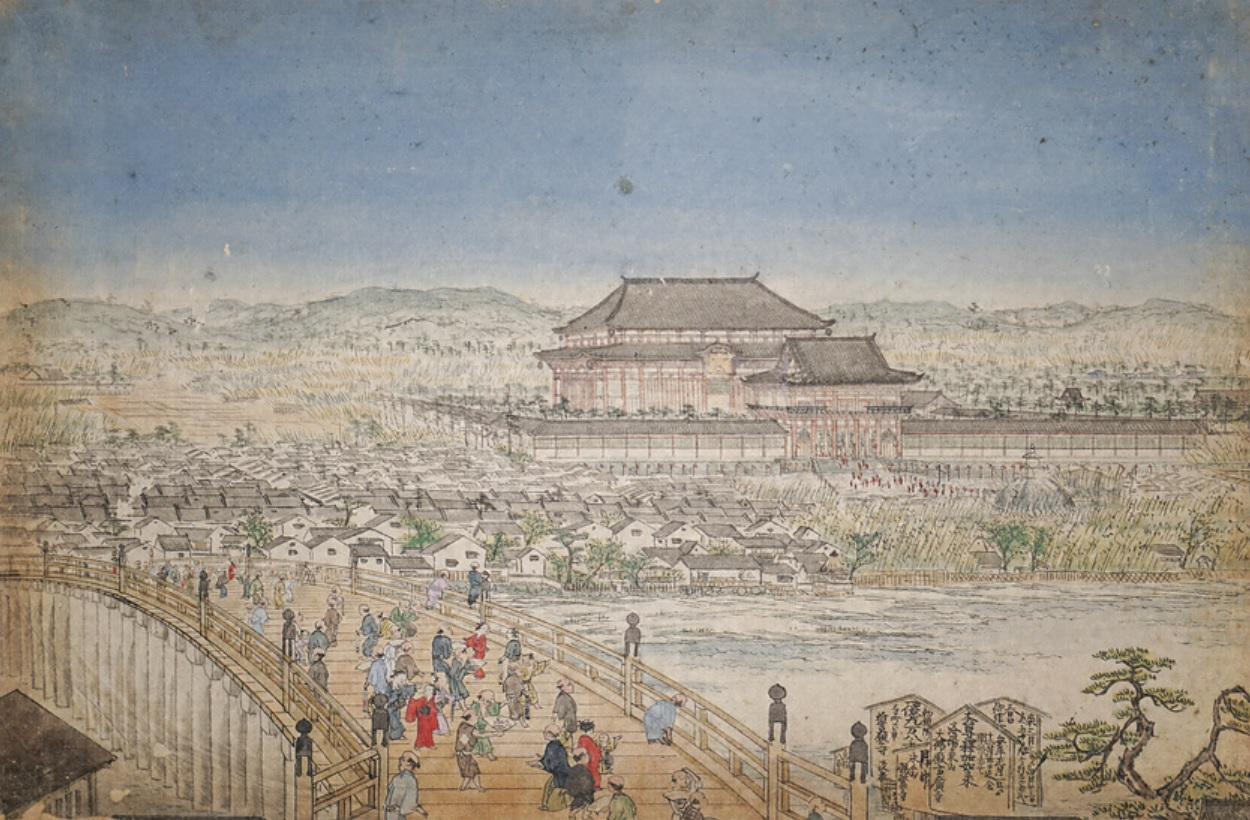
18th century painting of Hokoji Temple by Maruyama Ōkyo. Mimizuka can be seen in front of it (right)

Japanese chroniclers mention that during the Imjin War, the noses hacked off the faces of the massacred were also of ordinary civilians mostly in the provinces Gyeongsang, Jeolla, and Chungcheong. In the second invasion, Hideyoshi's orders were thus:

Mow down everyone universally, without discriminating between young and old, men and women, clergy and the laity—high ranking soldiers on the battlefield, that goes without saying, but also the hill folk, down to the poorest and meanest—and send the heads to Japan.

One hundred sixty thousand Japanese troops had gone to Korea where they had taken 185,738 Korean heads and 29,014 Chinese ones, a total of 214,752. As some might have been discarded, it is impossible to enumerate how many were killed overall during the war.

The Mimizuka was dedicated September 28, 1597. Though the exact reasons as to its construction are not entirely known, scholars contend that during the second Japanese invasion of Korea in 1597, Toyotomi Hideyoshi demanded his commanders show receipts of their martial valor in the destruction, dispatching congratulatory letters to his high-ranking warriors in the field as evidence of their service. Hideyoshi then ordered the relics entombed in a shrine on the grounds of Hokoji Temple, and set Buddhist priests to work praying for the repose of the souls of the tens of thousands of Koreans from whose bodies they had come; an act that chief priest Saishō Jōtai (1548–1608) would hail as a sign of Hideyoshi's "great mercy and compassion." The shrine initially was known as hanazuka (鼻塚), Mound of Noses, but several decades later this would come to be regarded as too cruel-sounding a name, and would be changed to the more euphonious but inaccurate mimizuka (耳塚), Mound of Ears, the misnomer by which it is known to this day. Other nose tombs dating from the same period are found elsewhere in Japan, such as at Okayama.

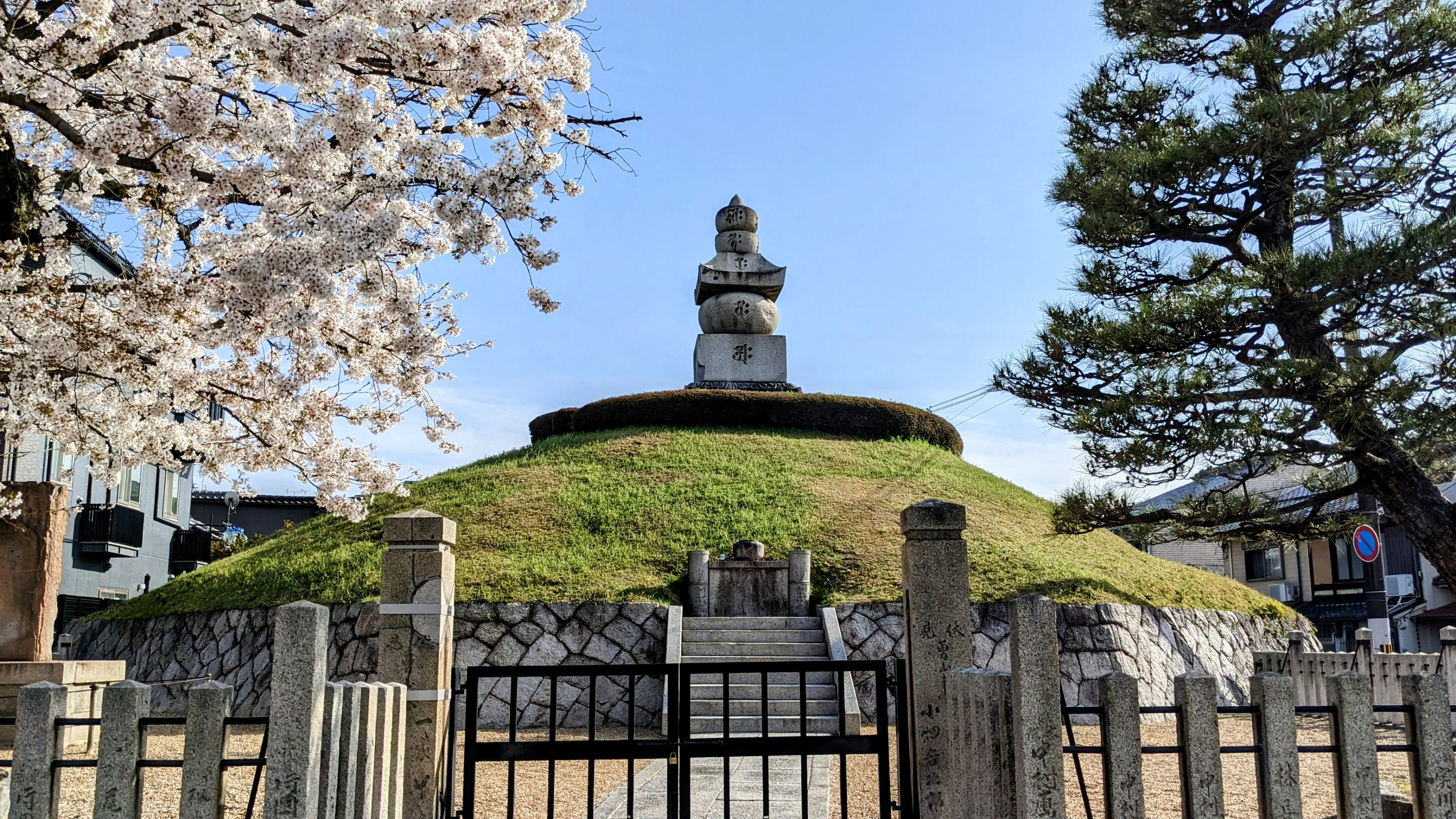
Mimizuka from the front

=== Effect on modern foreign relations ===
The Mimizuka is almost unknown to the Japanese public, unlike with the Koreans. The British historian Stephen Turnbull called the Mimizuka "Kyoto's least mentioned and most often avoided tourist attraction". A plaque, which was later removed, stood in front of the Ear Mound in the 1960s with the passage, "One cannot say that cutting off noses was so atrocious by the standard of the time." Most guidebooks do not mention the Ear Mound, and only a few Japanese or foreign tourists visit the site. The majority of visiting tourists are Korean—Korean tour buses are often seen parked near the Ear Mound.

In 1982, not a single Japanese school textbook mentioned the Ear Mound. As of 1997, the mound is referred to in about half of all high-school history textbooks according to Shigeo Shimoyama, an official of Jikkyo, a publishing company. The publisher released the first Japanese text book mentioning the Ear Mound in the mid-1980s. The Education Ministry of Japan at that time opposed the description as "too vivid" and pressured the publisher to reduce the tone and also to praise Hideyoshi for religiously dedicating the Ear Mound to store the spirits of the killed people.

In the 1970s under the Park Chung Hee administration, some of the officials of the South Korean government asked Japan to level the monument. However, most South Koreans said that the mound should stay in Japan as a reminder of past savagery. In 2005, the activity since the 1990s was described as:

In 1990 a Korean Buddhist monk named Pak Sam-jung traveled to Kyoto and, with the support of a private local organization, concluded a ceremony in front of the tomb to comfort the spirits residing there and guide them home to Korea. Over the next six years the Japanese organization that hosted this event spearheaded a drive to get the mimizuka itself sent home, submitting a petition bearing twenty-thousand signatures to Kyoto city officials, and pledging to bear the cost of excavating the contents of the tomb and shipping them to Korea, together with the nine-meter-high earthen mound and the stone pagoda on top. When Pak Sam-jung returned to Kyoto in 1996, the tomb's return seemed imminent. "These noses were cut off as trophies of war for Toyotomi Hideyoshi," he announced upon leaving Seoul. "They have been there in Kyoto for four-hundred years. It is now our duty to see them returned to Korea to assuage the grief of the 126,000 people whose remains are buried there." In the end the necessary permission to move the mimuzuka was not forthcoming from the Japanese government. It was decided that, as an officially designated national cultural asset, the tomb should stay where it was. It remains in Kyoto to this day, little known and not often visited, and not well marked for tourists. It is just west of Kyoto National Museum and Toyokuni Jinja, the Shinto shrine dedicated to Toyotomi Hideyoshi, who was deified as a kami after his death. Funding from the government is insufficient to care for the site, so the work is done by local residents, who volunteer to cut the grass and tidy up the grounds.

On September 28, 1997, the 400th anniversary of the Mimizuka, a ceremony was held in respect for those killed, which people of all nationalities and faiths attended. The current caretaker of Mimizuka as of August 2009 is Shimizu Shirou (清水四郎).

Images from around the monument
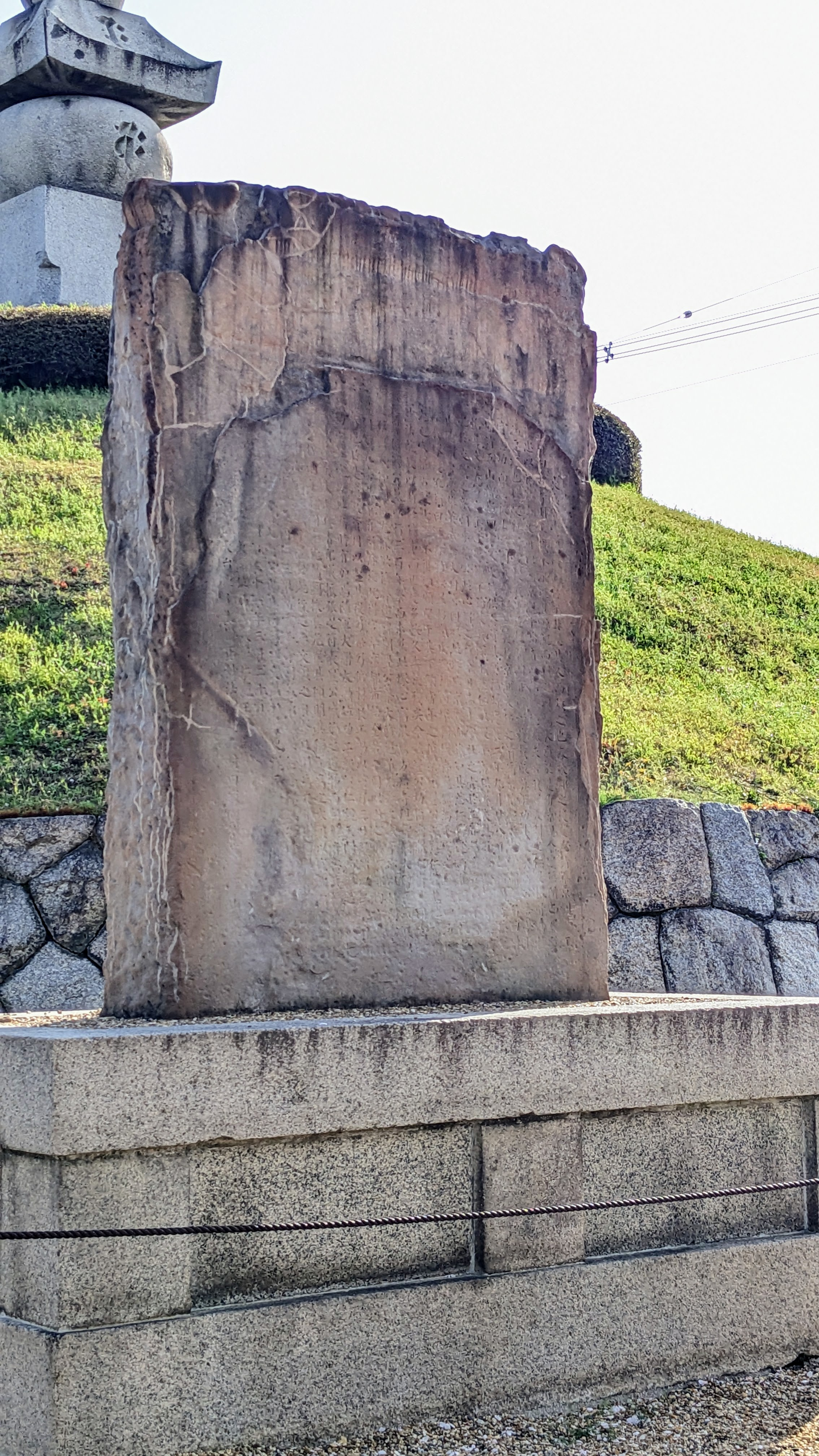
Stone monument in front of Mimizuka

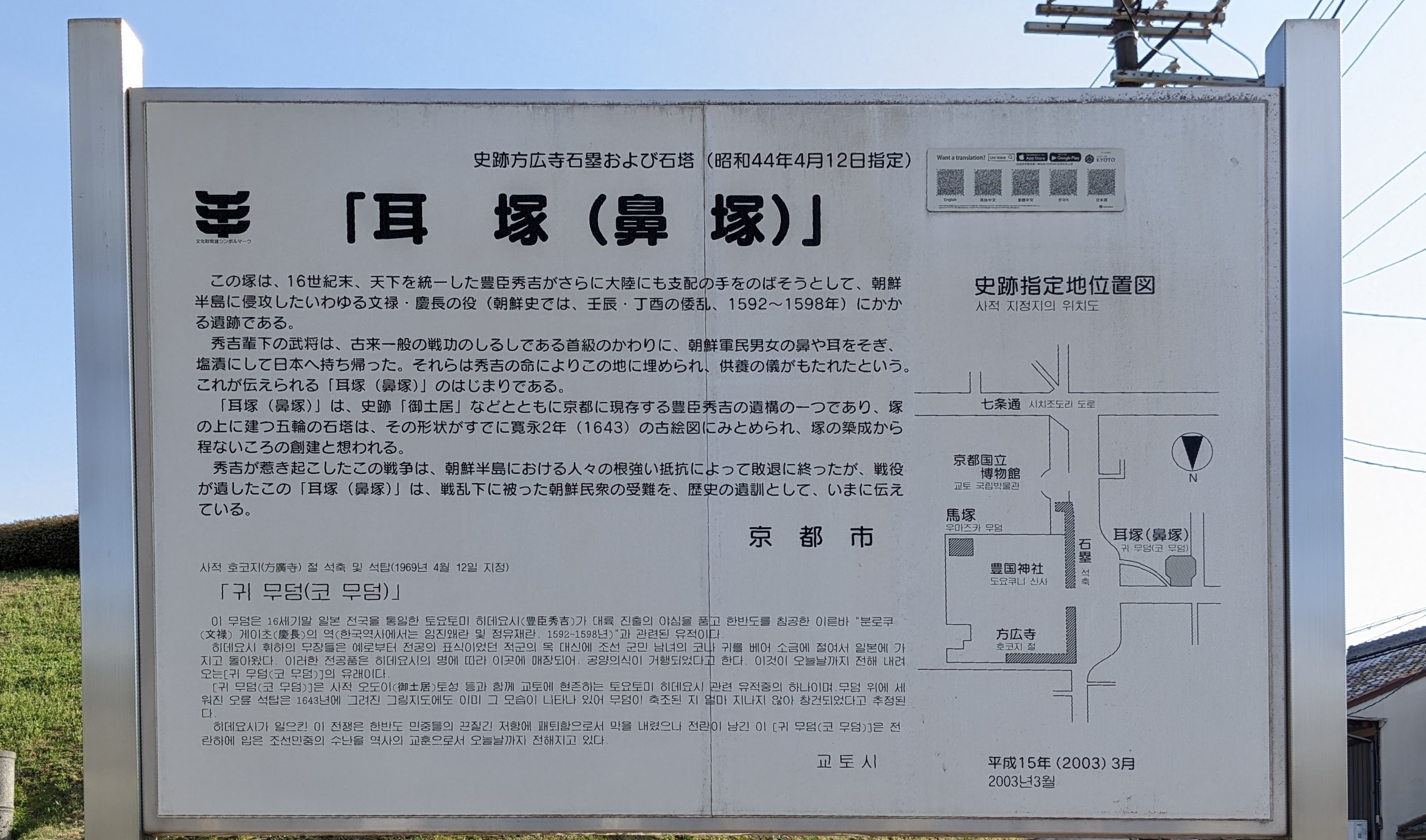
Sign found in front of Mimizuka

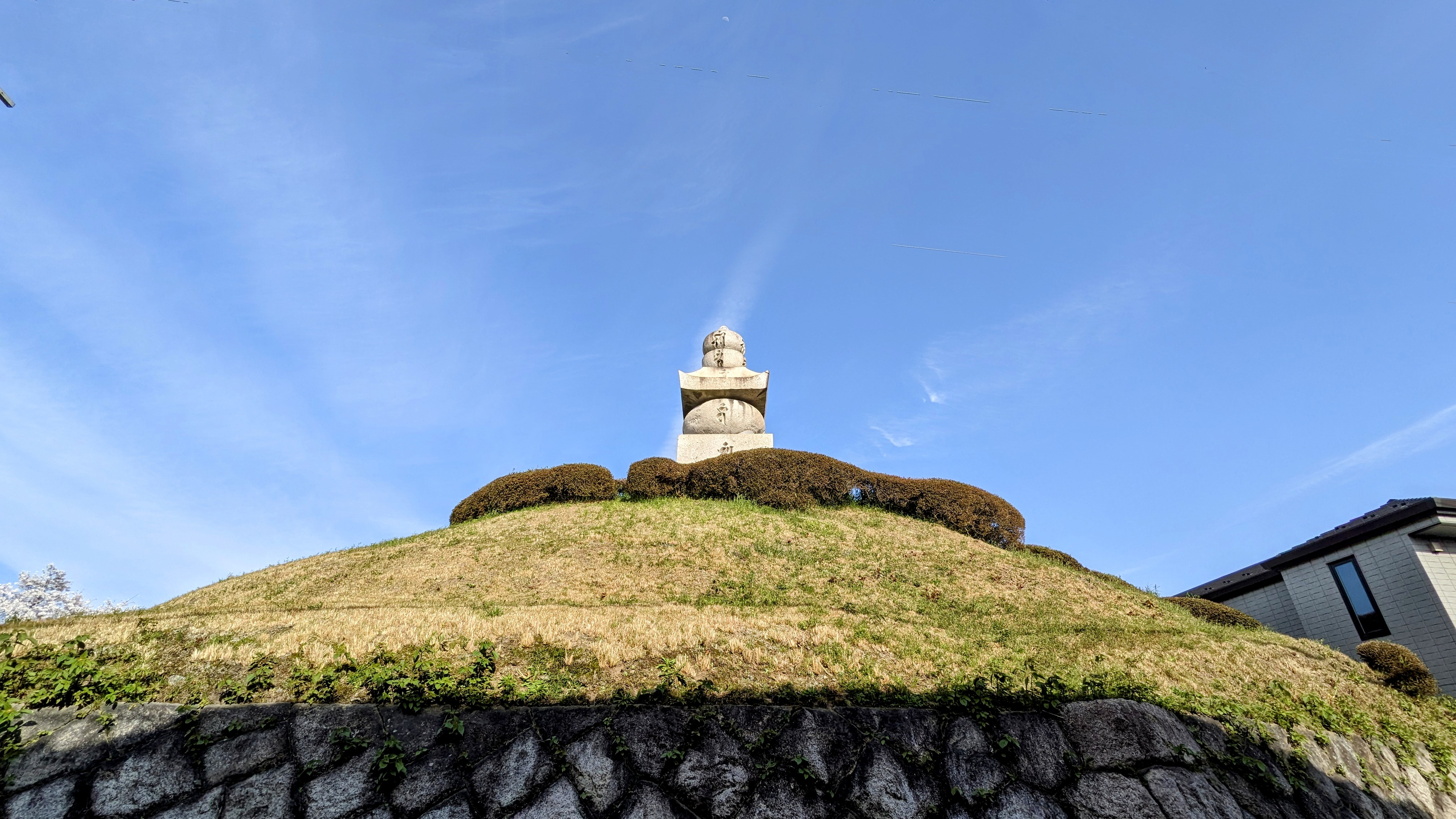
Back side of Mimizuka

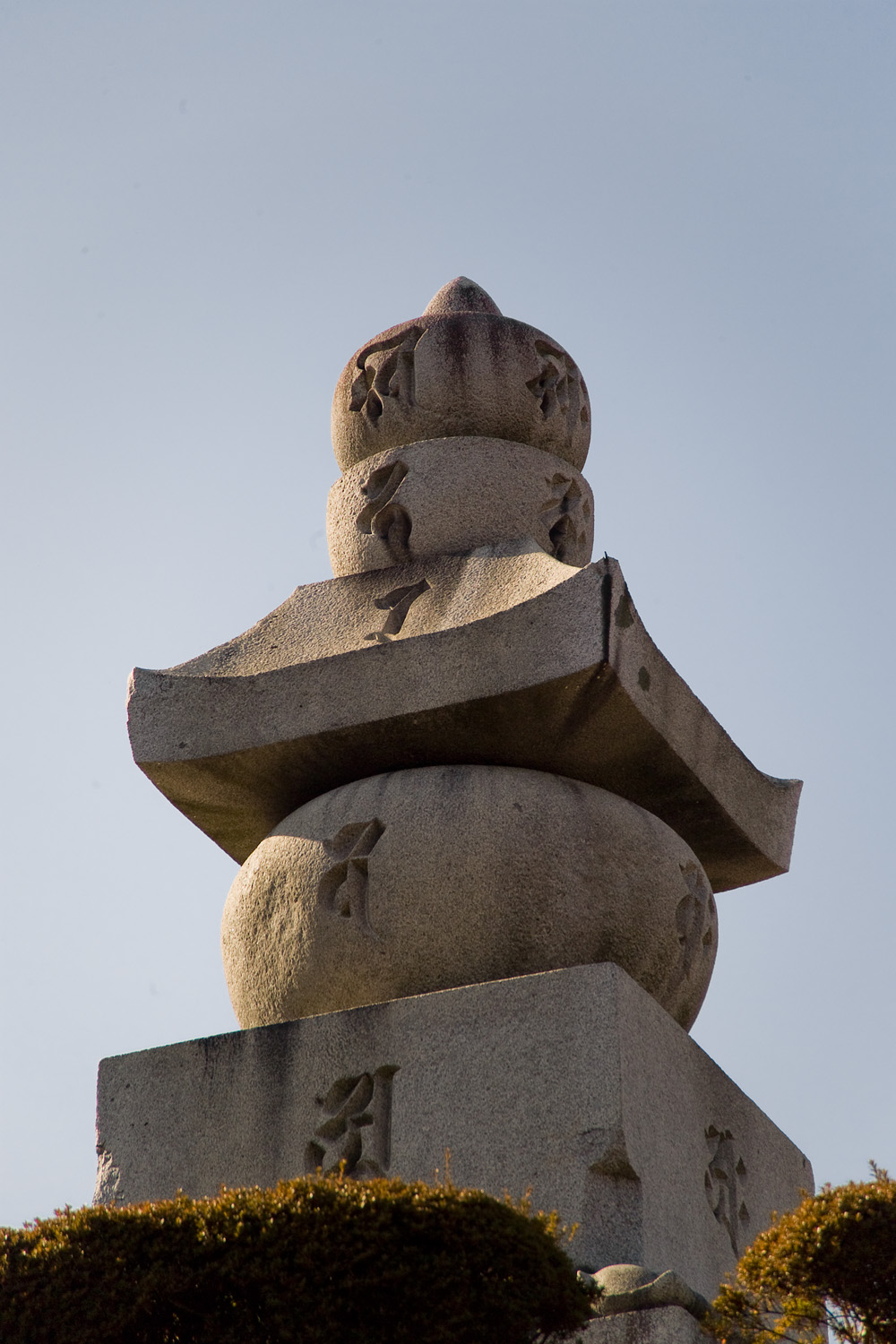
Mimizuka monument on top of the mound
Example 1

== See also ==
- Anti-Korean sentiment in Japan
- Scalping
- Headhunting
- Human trophy collecting
- Yasukuni Shrine
- Utoro, Uji – a community of former Korean forced laborers in Kyoto
