= Battle of Minatogawa =

Battle in Japan on 5 July 1336

- Part of the Nanboku-chō Wars
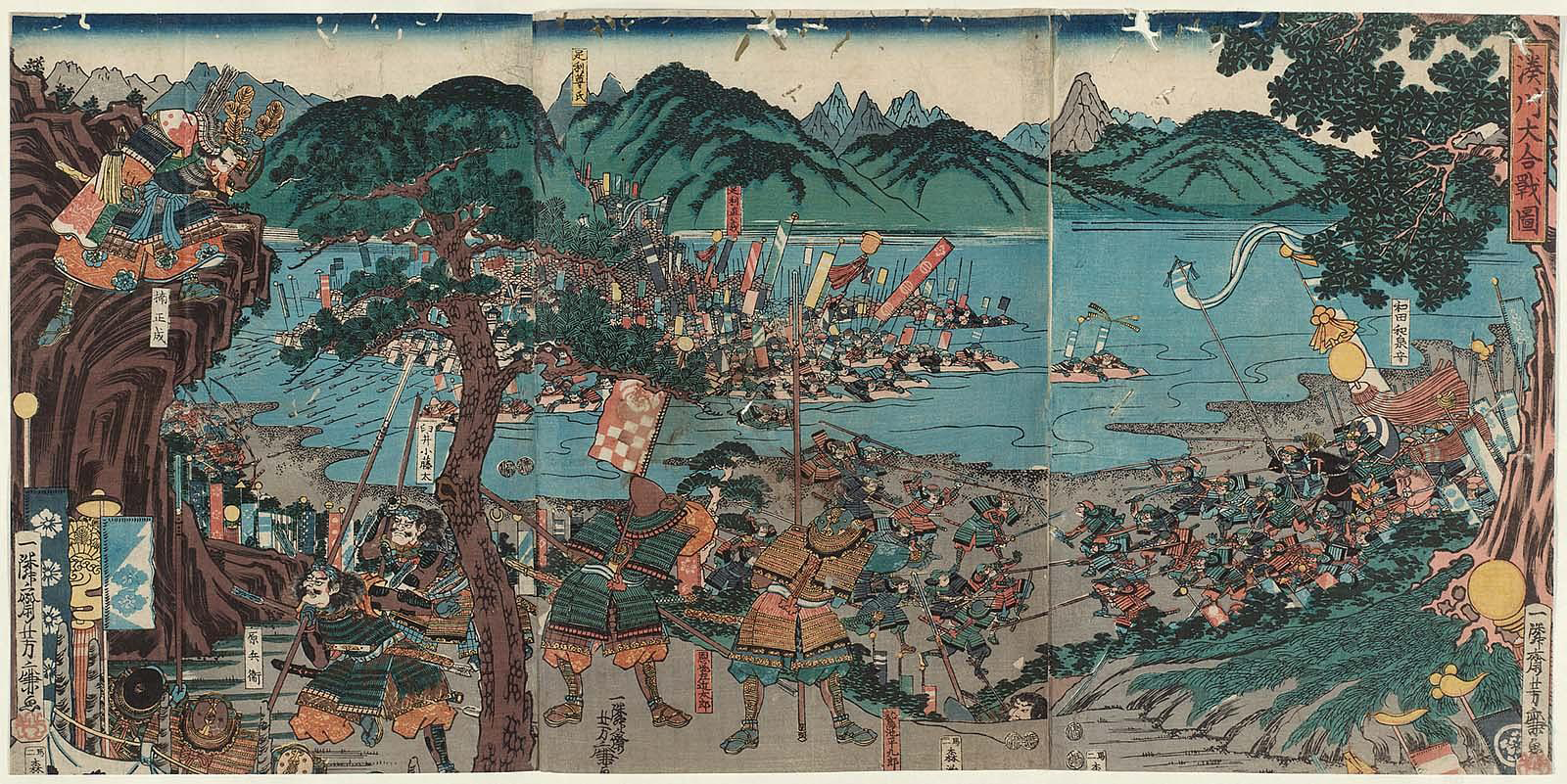
- Battle of Minatogawa
| Date | 5 July 1336 |
| Location | near the Minato River, Settsu Province (present-day Kobe, Hyōgo Prefecture) 34°40′48″N 135°09′57″E |
| Result | Ashikaga victory |

Belligerents
| Ashikaga clan | Imperial loyalist forces |

Commanders and leaders
| Ashikaga Takauji; Ashikaga Tadayoshi; Kō no Moroyasu | Kusunoki Masashige †; Nitta Yoshisada |

Strength
| 35,000 | 17,500 |

Casualties and losses
| Unknown | Kusunoki force decimated |
- Location within Japan

The Battle of Minatogawa (Japanese: 湊川の戦い), also known as the Battle of Minato River, was part of the Nanboku-chō Wars fought near the Minato River in Settsu Province (present day Kobe, Hyōgo Prefecture) on 5 July 1336.

The Imperial forces loyal to Emperor Go-Daigo led by Kusunoki Masashige and Nitta Yoshisada attempted to intercept the Ashikaga forces led by Ashikaga Takauji in Settsu. The Ashikaga invaded from Kyushu after consolidating their forces at the Battle of Tatarahama and attacked the Imperial force at the Minato River from land and sea. The Imperial force was surrounded and destroyed by Ashikaga, killing Kusunoki and causing Yoshisada to retreat, and allowing the Ashikaga to march to Kyoto.

The Battle of Minatogawa was a major defeat for the Imperial loyalists but became famous in Japanese mythology for the loyalty displayed by Kusunoki to the Emperor in the face of certain death and defeat.

== Background ==
In February 1336, the defeat of the rebellious Ashikaga clan in the Nanboku-chō Wars forced Ashikaga Takauji to flee the capital Kyoto for the island of Kyushu. With this position of strength, the Imperial general Kusunoki Masashige had attempted to persuade Emperor Go-Daigo to seek peace with the Ashikaga. However, believing that the threat of the Ashikaga clan could be eliminated, Go-Daigo refused and ordered Nitta Yoshisada to assemble the force to defeat the Ashikaga armies. Yoshisada launched his campaign as ordered, but when Akamatsu Norimura sided with the Ashikaga he was led into a protracted siege defending Shirahata Castle in Harima Province. With the Imperial forces distracted by the siege, the Ashikaga had time to regroup and consolidate its forces in Kyushu by winning the Battle of Tatarahama against Imperial loyalists in April. Immediately, Takauji launched the counter-invasion against the Imperial forces, advancing into Honshu by land and sea. Yoshisada was informed of Takauji's advance and ended the siege at Shirahata Castle, attempting to find a better defensive position against the Ashikaga invasion by retreating to Hyogo.

== Battle ==
Troops disposition at Minatogawa

Emperor Go-Daigo ordered Kusunoki to gather his force and to reinforce Yoshisada in Settsu despite the strategic flaws of the plan. Kusunoki proposed that the Emperor and Imperial forces hide on Mount Hiei near Kyoto, allowing the Ashikaga to enter the city and attacking from the mountain, trapping them and forcing them to defend the city while harassing their supply route. Go-Daigo rejected the proposal, refusing to leave Kyoto, and after failing to argue for the strategy, Kusunoki ordered his eldest son, Kusunoki Masatsura, back to his domain to continue the war before advancing to successfully join Yoshisada. The Imperial force had no naval force to prevent itself from being surrounded, but chose a defendable position near the Minato River and extended its troop east to attempt to prevent a landing from sea to the south.

The Ashikaga force chose to encircle and destroy the Imperial force. The main land force led by Ashikaga Tadayoshi attacked the Imperials from the west to tie down Masashige, with Shoni Yorihisa launching a side attack from the south and Shiba Takatsune circling from the north to attack from behind. The landing of Hosokawa Jozen further to the east forced Yoshisada to avoid an encirclement by pulling back and Kusunoki was quickly surrounded with Takauji landing his naval force between two Imperial forces without any interference. Abandoned by the main Imperial force, the Kusunoki clan force was quickly overwhelmed and Kusunoki Masashige, his brother Kusunoki Masasue, and all his clansmen were subsequently killed. Yoshisada was forced back to Kyoto which was quickly abandoned as undefendable and Go-Daigo retreated to the religious sanctuary of Mount Hiei, which he had previously refused to do.

The unimpeded force of Ashikaga clan entered Kyoto and enthroned Emperor Kōmyō, beginning the Northern Court-Southern Court rivalry of the Nanboku-chō period as Go-Daigo fled Kyoto to Yoshino.

== Cultural significance ==
The Battle of Minatogawa and series of battles are recorded with drama and exaggeration of accounts in Taiheiki, a historical epic which provides the wealth of information known to this period. During the Edo period, Kusunoki, despite only commanding a fraction of the Imperial force, became a figure of loyalty for choosing to sacrifice himself for the Imperial family against the impossible odds, with Tokugawa Mitsukuni writing the epitaph and Minatogawa Shrine consecrated on 24 May 1872 to cement his fame. The battle was commonly taught as a morality tale until the end of World War II, and Captain Goro Nonaka criticized the use of Ohka by 721st Naval Air Group comparing it to this battle as a sign of futility.
