= Kusunoki Masashige =

Japanese samurai (1294–1336)

Kusunoki Masashige Senior First Rank
- 楠木 正成
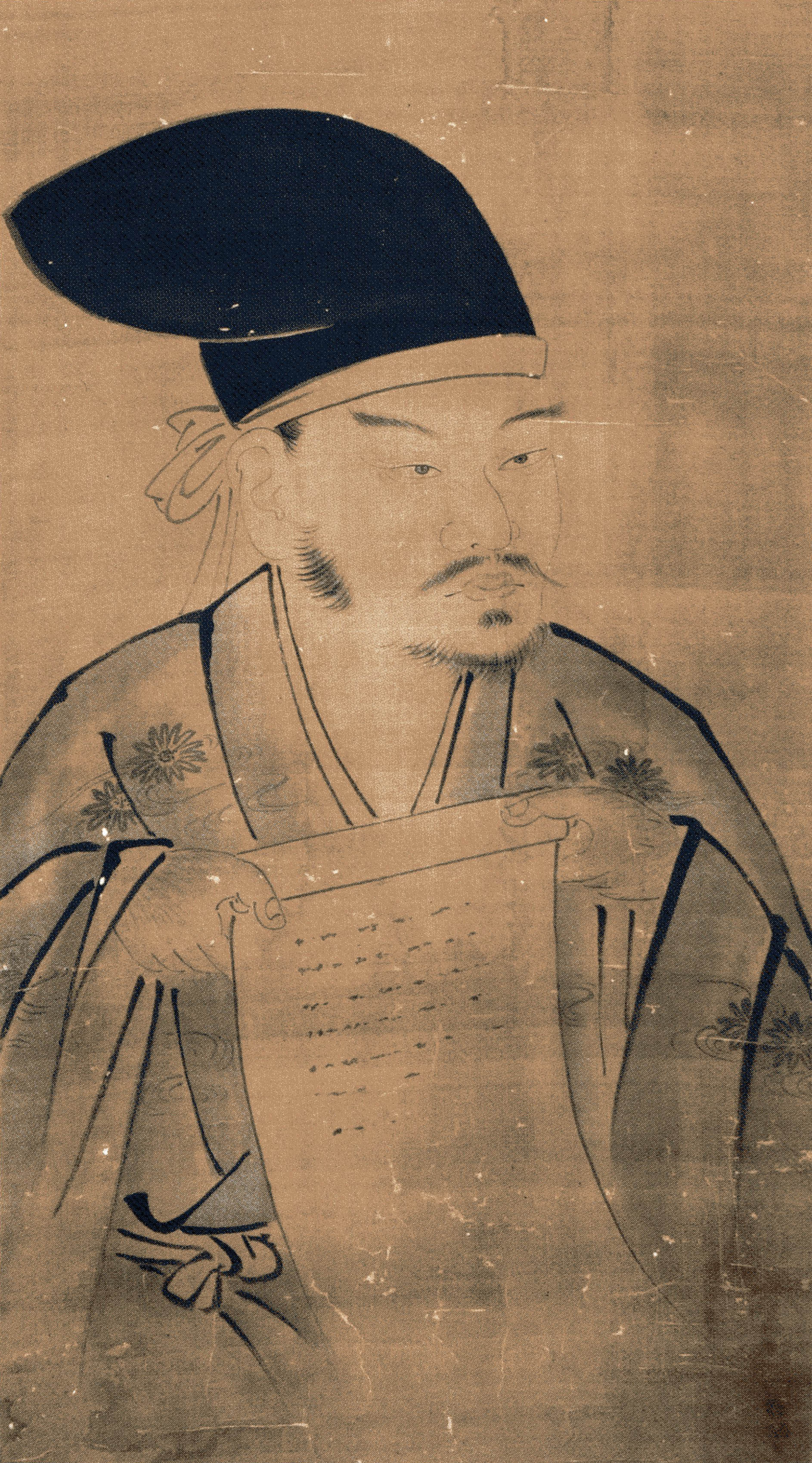
- Portrait of Kusunoki Masashige by Kanō Sanraku, c. before 1635
- Born: 1294
- Died: 4 July 1336 (aged 41–42)
- Resting place: Kanshin-ji
- Monuments: Hōken-tō; Various statues
- Other names: Dai Nankō, Hyōe-no-Jō, Saemon-no-Jō, Jō
- Occupation: Samurai
- Known for: Overthrowing the Kamakura shogunate, ideal samurai loyalty

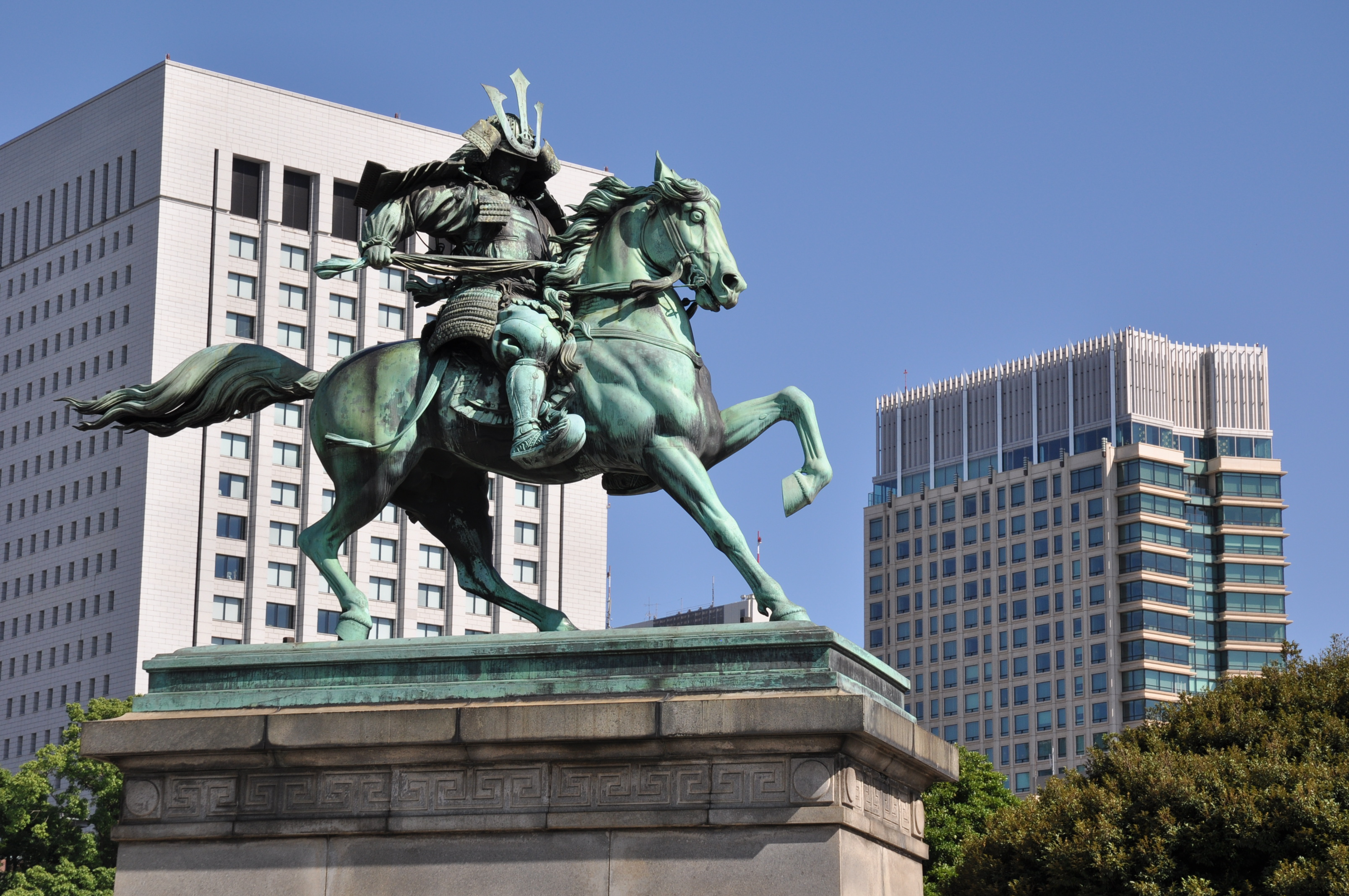
Equestrian statue of Kusunoki Masashige outside the Imperial Palace in Tokyo.

Kusunoki Masashige (Japanese: くすのき まさしげ、, Kyūjitai: 楠木 正成; Japanese pronunciation: [kɯ̥.sɯꜜ.no.kʲi], 1294 – 4 July 1336), or (Note: After the time of Meiji) Dai Nankô (大楠公; [naꜜŋ.koː], lit. 'Lord Kusunoki'), was a Japanese military commander and samurai of the Kamakura period remembered as the ideal loyal samurai.

Kusunoki fought for Emperor Go-Daigo in the Genkō War to overthrow the Kamakura shogunate and restore power in Japan to the Imperial Court. Kusunoki was a leading figure of the Kenmu Restoration in 1333, and remained loyal to the unpopular Emperor Go-Daigo after Ashikaga Takauji began to reverse the restoration in the Nanboku-chō wars three years later. Kusunoki attacked Takauji in Settsu at the command of the Emperor, an act of obedience sure to result in defeat. He performed seppuku at the Battle of Minatogawa in 1336.

Kusunoki became a popular legend in Japan representing loyalty and virtue, and associated with the phrase "Would that I had seven lives to give for my country!" (七生報國, Shichishō Hōkoku!). Kusunoki was posthumously awarded the highest court rank in Japan, Senior First Rank (shō ichi-i), by the Meiji government in 1880, over 500 years after his death. He was highly regarded as one of "Japan's three loyal retainers" along with Fujifusa Madenokoji and Taira no Shigemori.

== Early life ==
Kusunoki Masashige's origin has not been validated and it was merely six years between the start of his military campaign in 1331 and his demise in 1336. Kusunoki is believed to have been born in 1294 in Kawachi Province as a "well-to-do member of the rural gentry" and claimed descent from Tachibana Moroe, "a great nobleman" of the eighth century. His birthplace has been linked to the village of Chihaya-Akasaka where a small monument called the "Nanko Tanjochi" can be found.

Kusunoki was a "scholar and a devout Buddhist" with much of his early education taking place at Kanshin-ji Temple in Kawachinagano, in present-day southern Osaka Prefecture. Later in his life, Kusunoki would arrange for considerable renovations to the temple. While studying at Kanshin-ji, he would make regular trips to central Kawachinagano to study strategy under the tutelage of a man named Oe Tokichika.

According to legend, Emperor Go-Daigo had a dream in which he was sheltering under a camphor tree (クスノキ [kusunoki] in Japanese), and that this dream led him to the surname of the warrior who would support him.

== Military career ==
A brilliant tactician and strategist, Kusunoki's cunning defense of two key Loyalist fortresses at Akasaka, the Siege of Akasaka, and Chihaya, the Siege of Chihaya, helped allow Go-Daigo to briefly return to power. He lived during the Kamakura period.

In 1333, Go-Daigo rewarded Masashige with governorship of Izumi Province and Kawachi Province. Furthermore, he was promoted to Fifth Rank. Later he was appointed to the Records Office and Settlements Board.

He is also thought to have built a number of smaller castles throughout southern Osaka, particularly within what is now the city of Kawachinagano. Eboshigata Castle and Ishibotoke Castle were both built along the route of the Koya Kaido, a popular pilgrimage trail stretching between Kyoto and Koyasan. These castles were designed not only to protect the trail from bandits but also as an important source of income and intelligence as travelers were obliged to pay a toll and the garrison would listen out for rumours and news from around Japan.

== Battle of Minato River and end ==
A loyalist general, Ashikaga Takauji, betrayed Go-Daigo and led an army against Kusunoki and the remaining loyalists. Takauji was able to take Kyoto, but only temporarily before Nitta Yoshisada and Masashige were able to dislodge Takauji, forcing him to flee to the west. By 1336 however, Takauji was a threat to Kyoto again.

Kusunoki suggested to the Emperor that they take refuge on sacred Mount Hiei and allow Takauji to take Kyoto, only to swoop down from the mountain, and with the help of the monks of Mount Hiei, trap Takauji in the city and destroy him.

Go-Daigo was unwilling to leave the capital however, and insisted that Kusunoki meet Takauji's superior forces in the field in a pitched battle. Kusunoki, in what would later be viewed as the ultimate act of samurai loyalty, obediently accepted his Emperor's foolish command and knowingly marched his army into almost certain death. The battle, which took place at Minatogawa in modern-day Chūō-ku, Kobe, was a tactical disaster. There are two accounts of the proposal made by Kusunoki Masashige to the emperor Go-Daigo, the Taiheiki and the Baisho Ron. One was that they regroup and attack from two sides, the other was that they bring back general Takauji to their side thus balancing the scales. Both arguments were ignored.

Kusunoki, his army completely surrounded, was down to only 73 of the original 700 horsemen. Kusunoki, Masasue, Governor of Kawachi Usami Masayasu, Jingūji no Tarō Masamoro, of the Middle Palace Guards, and Wada Gorō Masataka, and other principal members of the Kusunoki clan as well as sixty retainers withdrew to a house in a village north of the Minato River. There they sat in two rows praying a Buddhist prayer ten times in unison. The brothers stabbed each other and died.

According to legend, his brother Masasue's last words were Shichishō Hōkoku! (七生報國; 'Would that I had seven lives to give for my country!') and Kusunoki Masashige agreed. Upon his death, his head was removed and sent to Kanshin-ji where it was buried in a kubizuka.

== Legacy ==
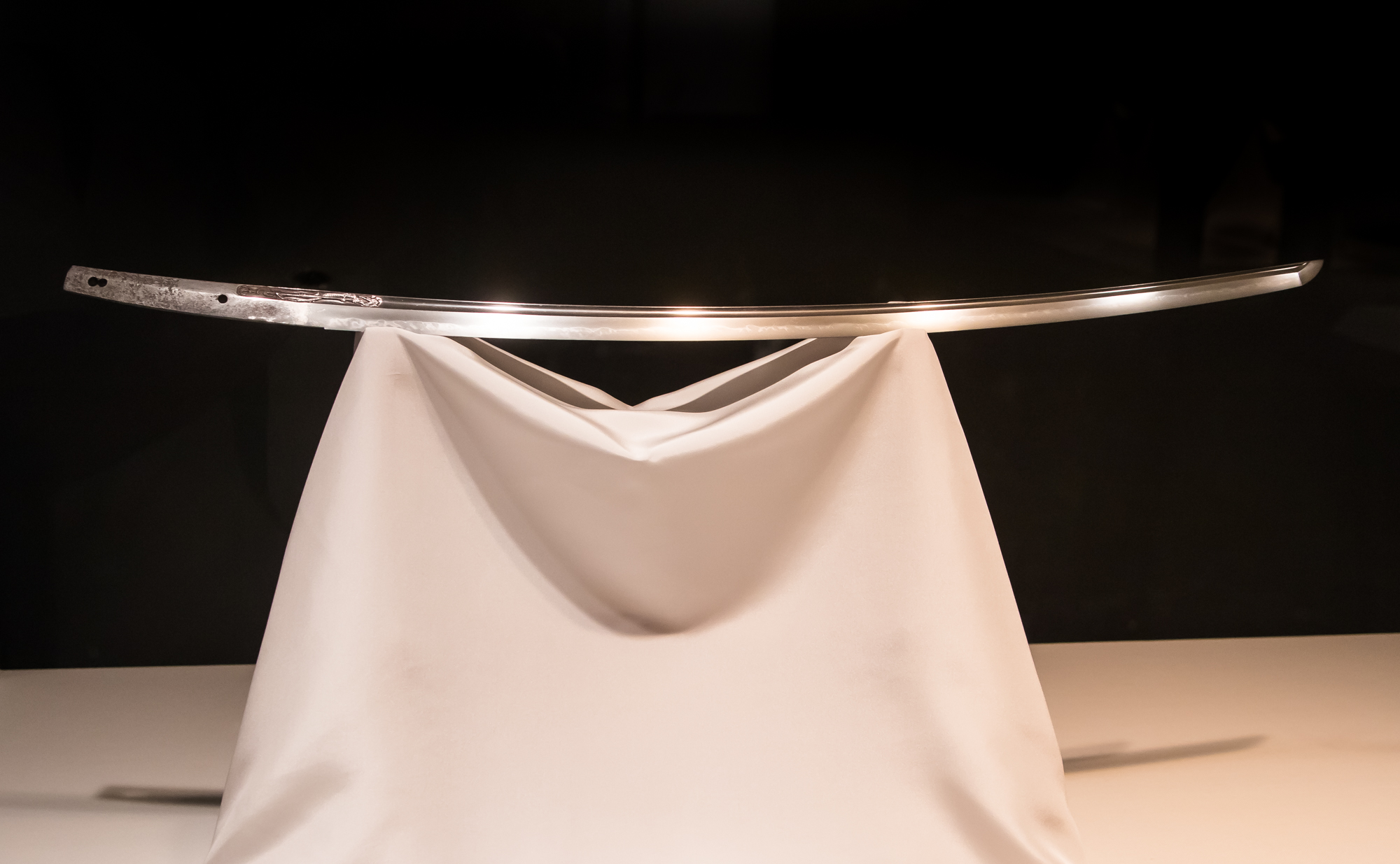
Kagemitsu Sword of Kusunoki Masashige, also called Little Dragon Kagemitsu (Koryū Kagemitsu) after a relief on the face of the blade, curvature: 2.7 cm (1.1 in) Kamakura period, May 1322 80.6 cm (31.7 in) Tokyo National Museum, Tokyo

His son, Kusunoki Masatsura, served the emperor's successor, the 12-year-old Go-Murakami, in a relationship of reciprocal trust and devotion mirroring the figure of his father Kusunoki and keeping the flame of loyalist resistance alive. Masatsura died alongside his brother Masatoki and cousin Wada Takahide in a battle that saw the end of the Kusunoki clan and there followed a less-than-ideal scramble for power and gain among the Courts.

Kusunoki "stands in the history of his country as the ideal figure of a warrior, compact of civil and military virtues in a high degree."

The parting of Masashige with his son "used to be included in all elementary school readers and was the subject of a patriotic song which was popular in Japanese schools before World War II."

Masashige had a tachi called Little Dragon Kagemitsu (小龍景光, Koryū Kagemitsu). An elaborate Kurikara dragon was carved on the handle. Originally, the dragon's appearance was visible on the blade, but later, in the process of cutting off the handle and shortening the length, the dragon's body was hidden by the handle. The dragon is a manifestation of Acala.

== Legend ==
After the full-scale introduction of Neo-Confucianism as a state philosophy by the Tokugawa shogunate, Kusunoki Masashige, once called a traitor by the Northern Court, was resurrected with Emperor Go-Daigo as a precursor of Sinocentric absolutists, based upon the Neo-Confucian theories. During the Edo period, scholars and samurai who were influenced by the Neo-Confucian theories popularized the legend of Kusunoki and enshrined him as a patriotic hero, called Nankō (楠公) or Dai Nankō (大楠公), who epitomized loyalty, courage, and devotion to the Emperor. In 1871 Minatogawa Shrine is established in order to enshrine the kami spirit of Kusunoki Masashige. Kusunoki later became a patron saint of sorts to World War II kamikaze, who saw themselves as his spiritual heirs in sacrificing their lives for the Emperor.

== Family ==
Brother:

- Kusunoki Masasue

Children:

- Kusunoki Masatsura
- Kusunoki Masanori
- Kusunoki Masatoki

== Honours ==
- Senior First Rank (July 20, 1880; posthumous)

== See also ==
- Nathan Hale – American Patriot, soldier, and spy for the Continental Army during the American Revolutionary War. He volunteered for an intelligence-gathering mission in New York City but was captured by the British and executed by hanging. His last words were, reportedly, "I only regret that I have but one life to lose for my country." If he was intending to paraphrase or quote anyone, however, it was likely Joseph Addison's play Cato, a Tragedy and not Kusunoki Masashige.
- Otoya Yamaguchi – 17-year-old Japanese right-wing ultranationalist who assassinated socialist politician Inejiro Asanuma during a televised debate in 1960. After being arrested and interrogated, Yamaguchi committed suicide in a detention facility less than three weeks after the assassination. Before committing suicide, Yamaguchi wrote with toothpaste on his cell wall, "Long live the Emperor" (天皇陛下万才, tennōheika banzai) and "Would that I had seven lives to give for my country" (七生報国, shichishō hōkoku).
