= Toyokuni Shrine (Kyoto) =

Shinto shrine in Kyoto, Japan

Toyokuni Shrine 豊国神社
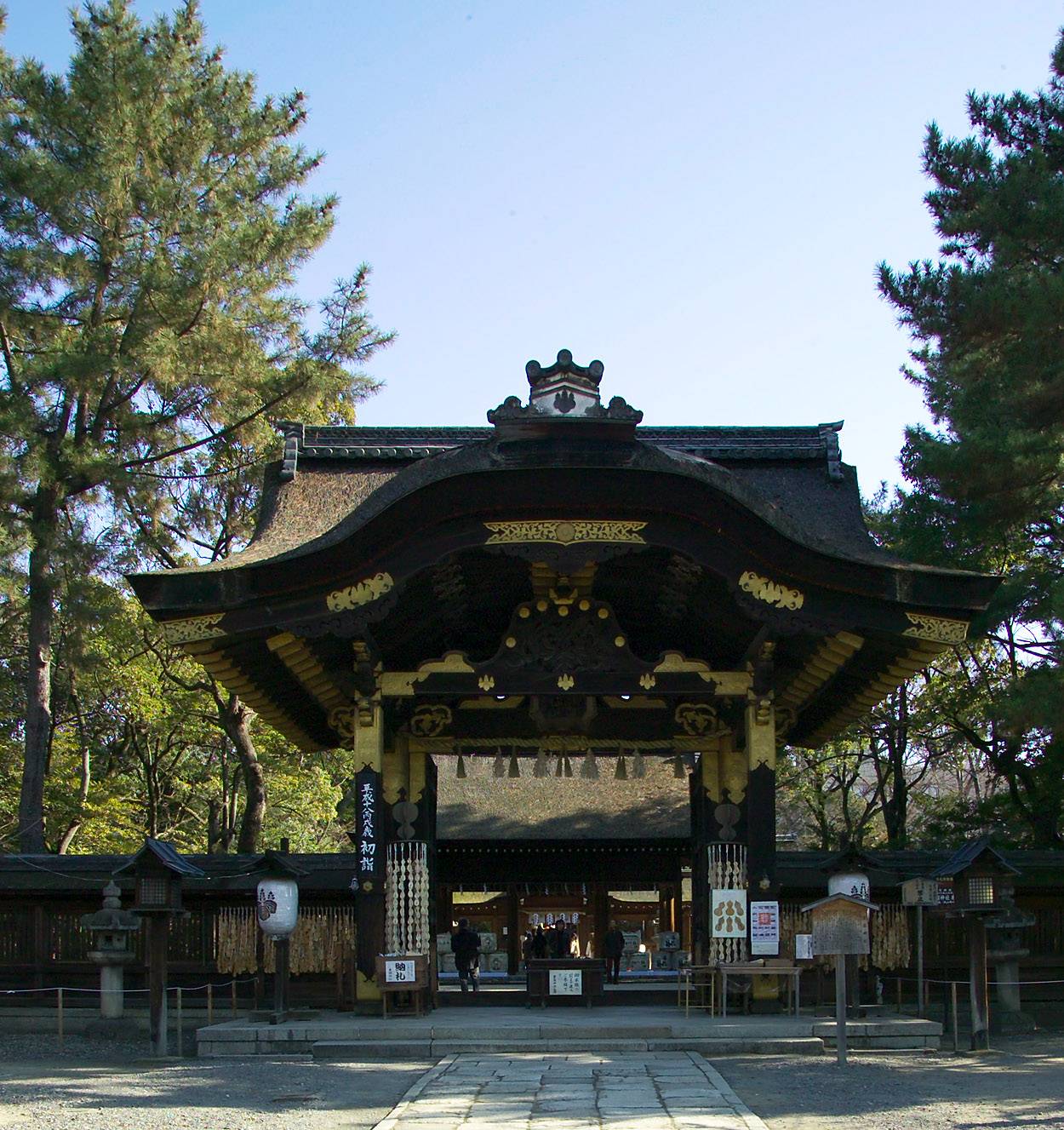
- Karamon gate at entrance to Toyokuni Shrine

- Location within Japan

Religion
- Affiliation: Shinto
- Deity: Toyotomi Hideyoshi

Location
- Location: 530 Chaya-chō, Shōmen-dōri, Yamato-ōdōri, Higashiyama-ku, Kyōto-shi, Kyōto-fu
- Interactive map of Toyokuni Shrine 豊国神社
- Coordinates: 34°59′29″N 135°46′21″E

Architecture
- Established: 1599; 427 years ago

Toyokuni Shrine (豊国神社, Toyokuni-jinja) is a Shinto shrine located in Higashiyama-ku, Kyoto, Japan. It was built in 1599 to commemorate Toyotomi Hideyoshi. It is the location of the first tamaya (a Shinto altar for ancestor worship) ever constructed, which was later destroyed by the Tokugawa clan.

== History ==
This shrine is the official tomb and shrine of Toyotomi Hideyoshi, who died on September 18, 1598, in Kyoto.

Nobles, priests, warriors, and townspeople gathered at the shrine to celebrate the anniversary of Hideyoshi's apotheosis with banquets, musical recitals, and boisterous festivity. The shrine was closed by Tokugawa Ieyasu in June 1615 "to discourage these unseemly displays of loyalty to a man he had eclipsed."

The Meiji Emperor directed that the shrine be restored in Keiō 4, the 6th day of the 6th month (April 28, 1868). At that time, the shrine area was expanded slightly by encompassing a small parcel of land which had been part of the adjacent Hōkō-ji.

In 1897, the tercentenary of Hideyoshi was celebrated at this site.

== Architecture ==
It is generally believed that the karamon gate was originally built for Hideyoshi's Fushimi castle in 1598. When the castle was dismantled in 1623, the gate was first moved to Nijō castle, and then to the Konchi-in in Nanzen-ji. It was finally relocated to Toyokuni shrine in 1876 after the Meiji Restoration.

== Designated Cultural Properties ==
=== National Treasures of Japan ===
- The karamon

=== Important Cultural Properties ===
- Painted folding screen depicting Festivals of Toyokuni (豊国の祭り), by Kanō Naizen of the Kanō School
- Vest garment decorated with gold Chrysanthemum motif
- Three decorated Chinese-style chests
- Iron lantern cage
- Naginata blade Honebami ("Bone-eater"), unsigned, attributed to Awataguchi Yoshimitsu

== Gallery ==
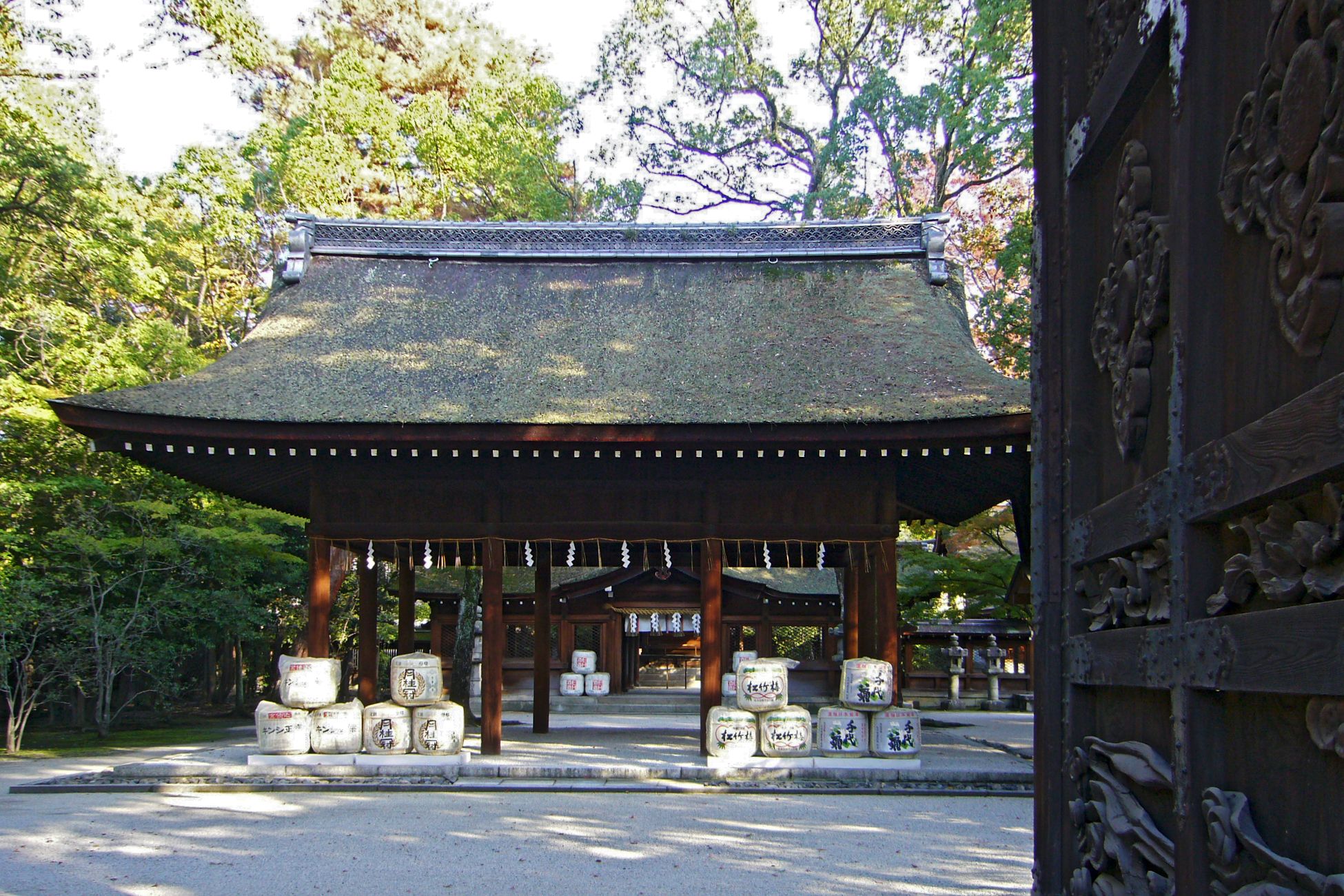
The front shrine and main hall

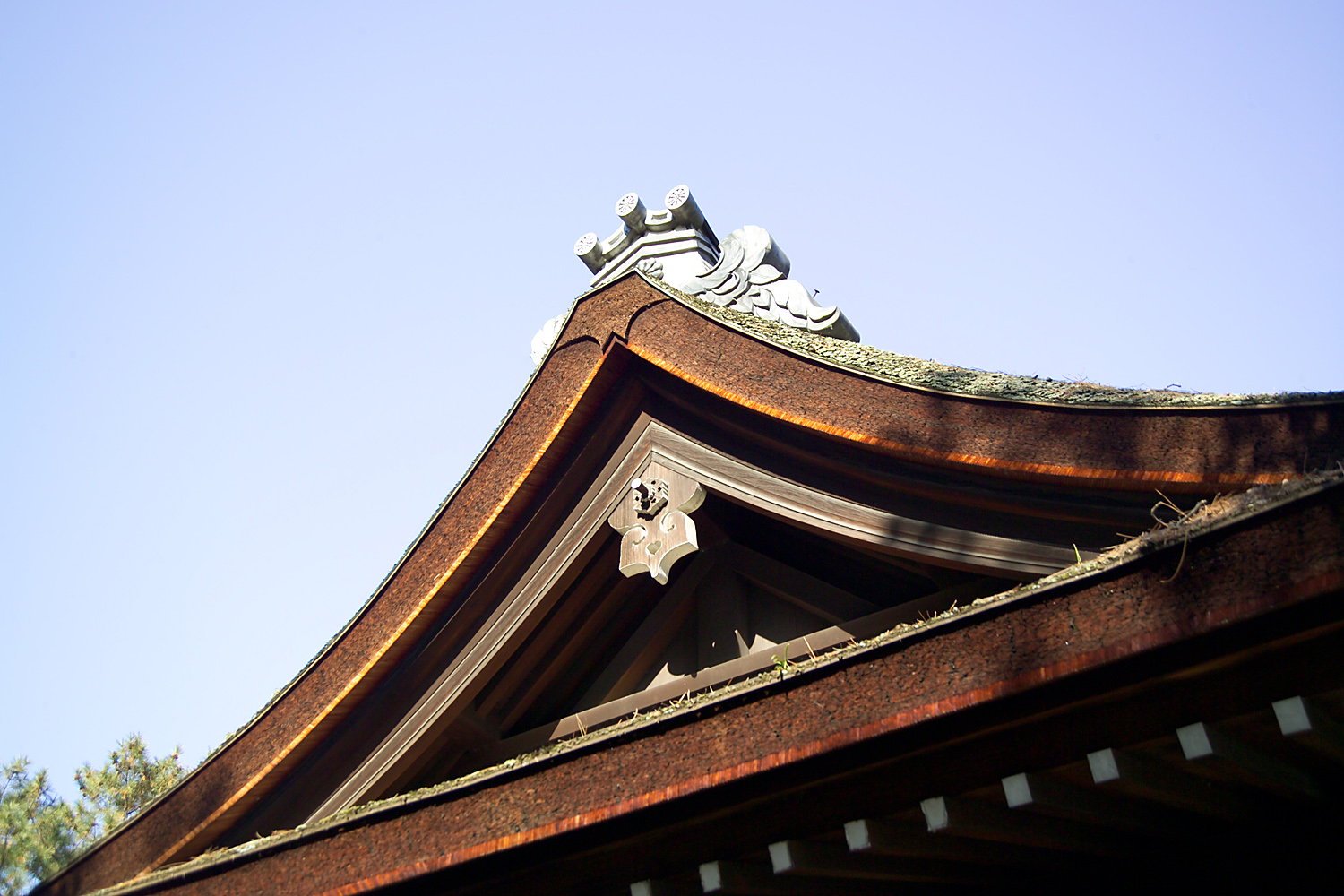
Roof

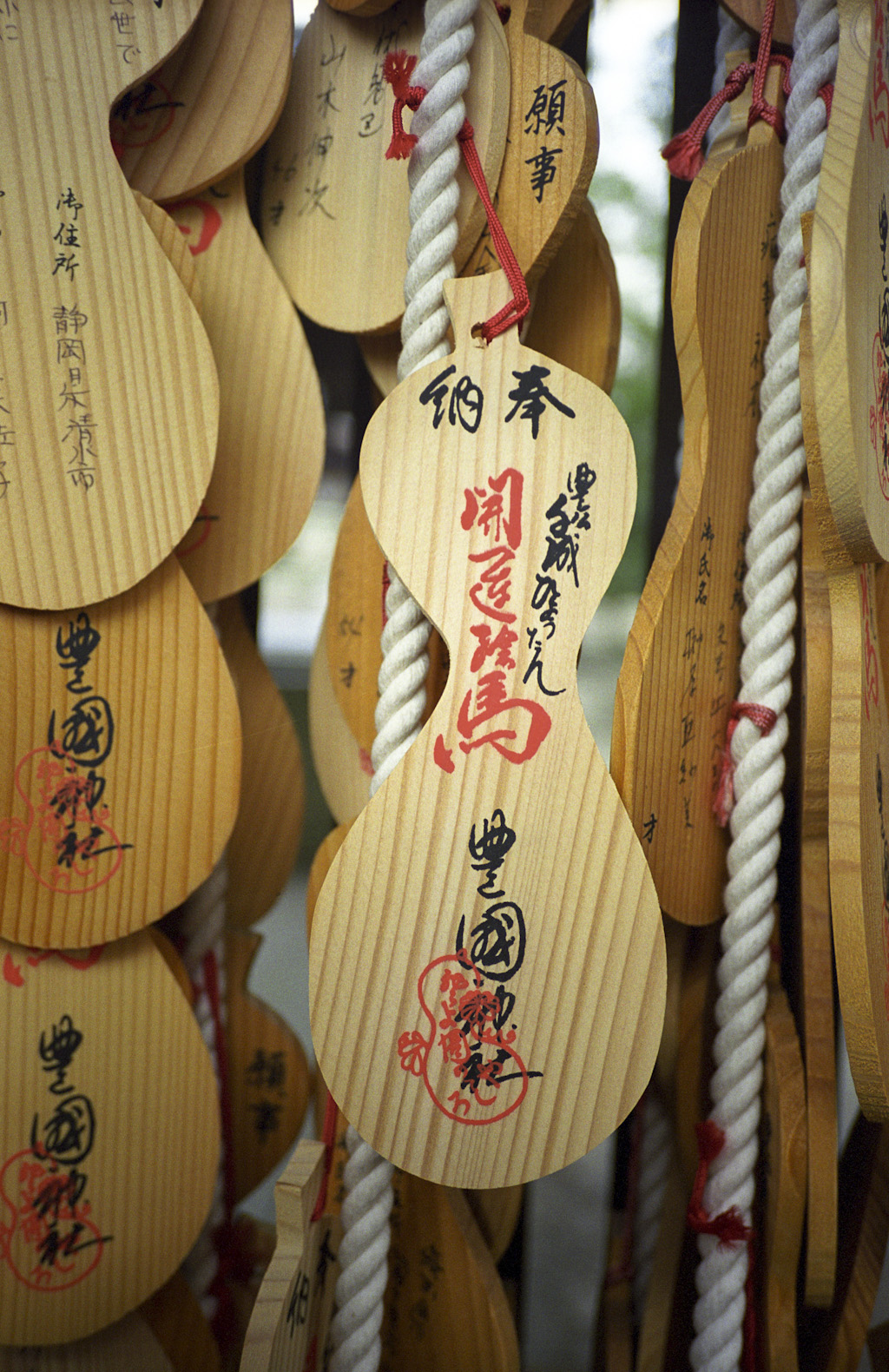
Ema

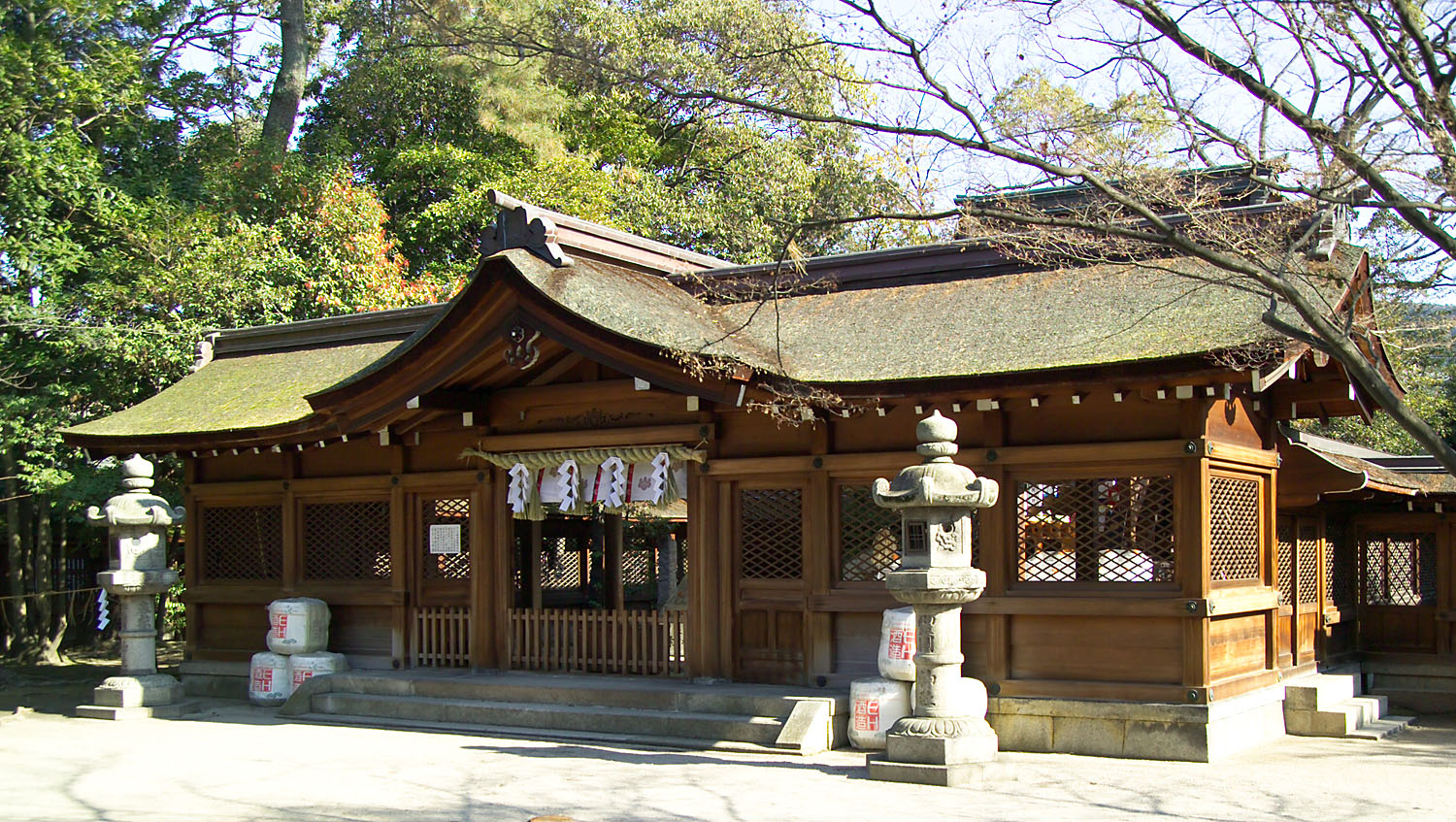

== See also ==
- Toyotomi Hideyoshi
- Mimizuka: a nose tomb containing the noses of Korean and Chinese people killed during the invasion of Korea
