= Battle of Shijōnawate =

Coordinates: 34°24′N 135°51′E

- Part of the Nanboku-chō period
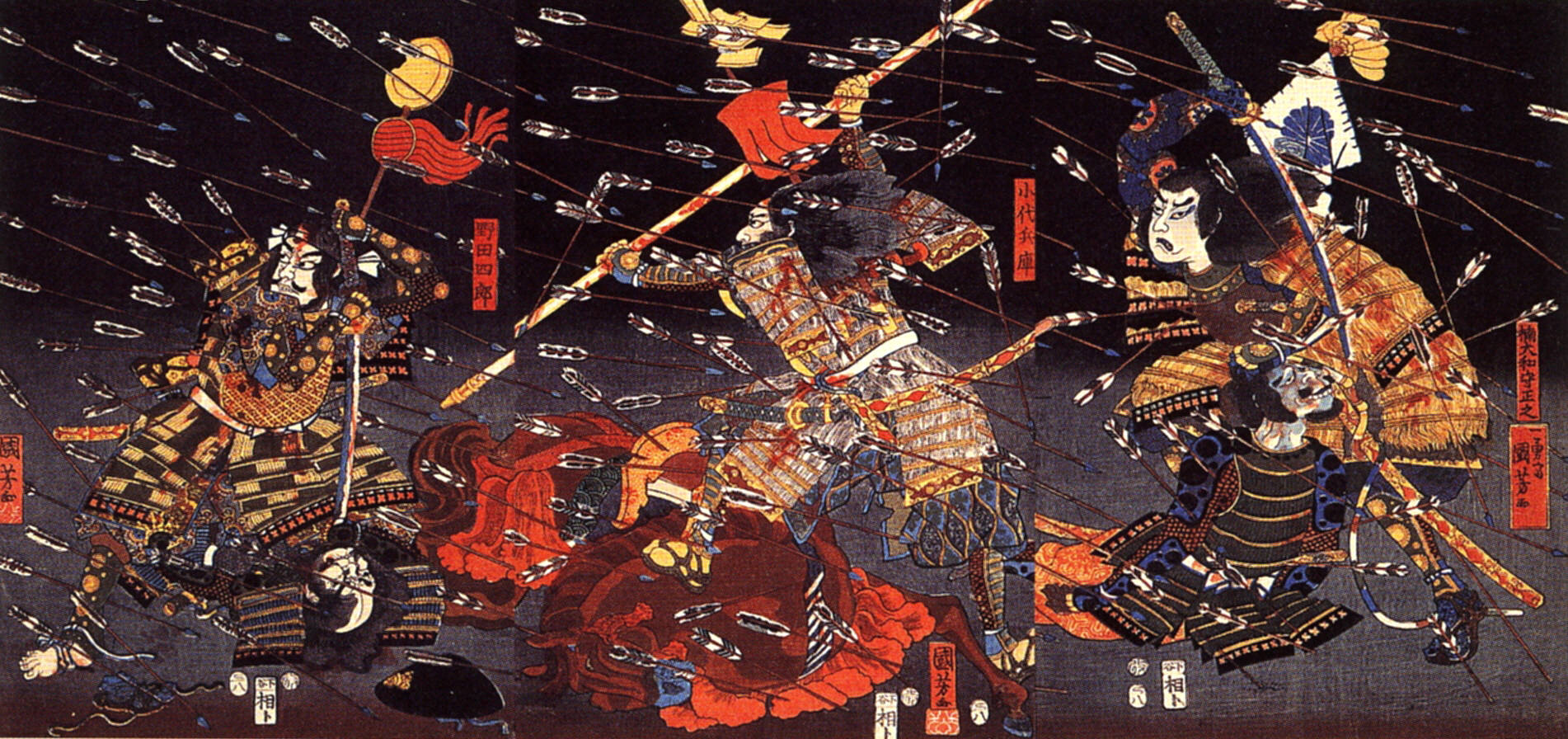
- The last stand of the Kusunoki at Shijonawate by Utagawa Kuniyoshi
Date	4 February 1348
Location	Yoshino, Japan
Result	Northern Court victory

Belligerents
Northern Court	Southern Court

Commanders and leaders
Kō no Moroyasu; Kō no Moronao	Kusunoki Masatsura †; Kitabatake Chikafusa

Strength
60,000–80,000	3,000

The 1348 Battle of Shijōnawate (四條畷の戰い) was a battle of the Nanboku-chō period of Japanese history, and took place in Yoshino, Nara. It was fought between the armies of the Northern and Southern Court of Japan.

== Overview ==
On February 4, 1348, the war began between Kusunoki Masatsura of the Southern Court and Kō no Moronao of the Northern Court. The Southern army was attacked at Yoshino, the temporary palace of the Imperial residence. Feeling too weak to defend the residence, Masatsura marched out with his whole force to meet his assailants. Kitabatake Chikafusa, meanwhile, led his force towards Izumi, diverting some of the attackers away from the palace.

Kusunoki engaged the enemy commander Kō no Moroyasu in single combat, and, it is said, was about to take Kō's head when he was struck by an arrow; Kusunoki then committed seppuku.

The battle ended in a Northern Court victory, but the Southern Court fled Yoshino, leaving little for their enemies to capture. Masatsura, along with his younger brother and second in charge, Masatoki, died during the war.
