= Kusunoki Masatsura =

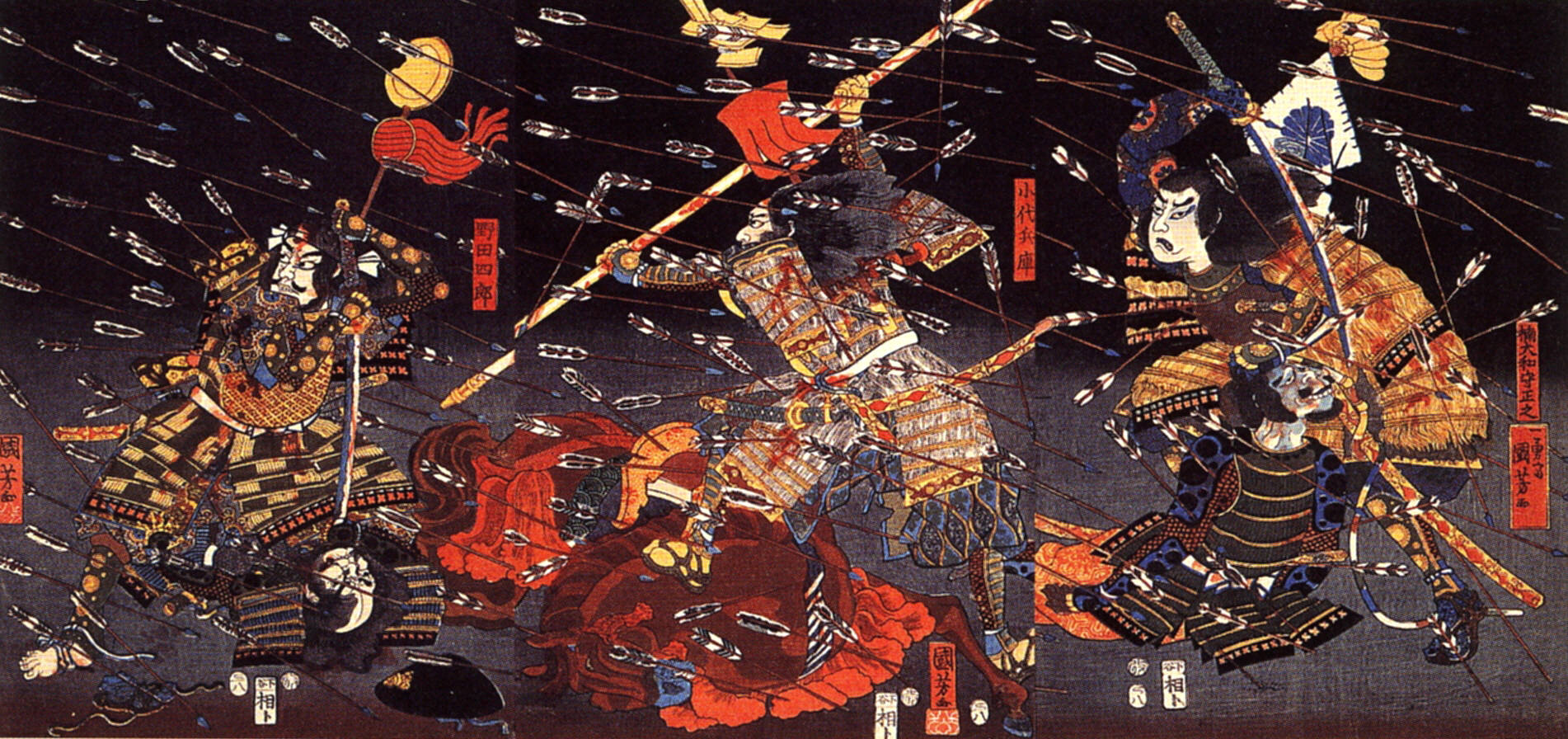
Kusunoki Masatsura, the son of Kusunoki Masashige continues his father's struggle against the Ashikaga forces. This print shows the final stage of the battle of Shijonawate in 1348.

Kusunoki Masatsura (楠木 正行; Japanese pronunciation: [ma.sa.tsɯ.ɾa], 1326 – 1348) was the eldest son of Kusunoki Masashige (1294 – 1336), and succeeded him as the head of the Kusunoki lineage. Along with his father and his younger brothers Masanori and Masatoki, Masatsura was a supporter of the Southern Imperial Court during Japan's Nanbokucho Wars.

Masatsura was one of the primary military leaders who contributed to a temporary revival of the fortunes of Japan's Southern Court in the 1340s. The Court had had little to no resources for three years; the strategy was too focused on defending their base at Yoshino, and not on gaining allies, land, or income. The Kusunoki family, and Masatsura in particular, fought to gain power and support for the Emperor. In 1347, Masatsura led an attack on bakufu (shogunate) sympathizers in Kii Province and ended up attracting supporters from Kii, as well as Izumi and Settsu Provinces. When the Shōgun's Northern Court sent Hosokawa Akiuji to stop him, Masatsura met Hosokawa and defeated him at Sakainoura. After several more campaigns against the bakufu, Masatsura was killed in the Battle of Shijō Nawate, in the second lunar month of 1348, at the age of 22.

Masatsura tends to be overshadowed by his father, whose tragic story and willingness to sacrifice himself for the Southern Court have inspired many Japanese, from the Edo period to the present day, to see him as a paragon of bravery and loyalty. Indeed, in modern times Masatsura is remembered primarily in the context of his relationship with Masashige, and especially of their final parting before Masashige set out on his final, doomed campaign. (A highly idealized depiction of this farewell – which is known as "Sakurai no wakare," or "the parting at Sakurai" – is among the most famous scenes in Taiheiki). Nonetheless, some of Masatsura's own later exploits have also been depicted in literary and dramatic works, as well as in pictorial art. One of the best-known episodes, included in the tale collection Yoshino shūi, concerns Masatsura's relationship with Ben no Naishi, a lady-in-waiting in the Southern Court's palace in Yoshino who was said to be the most beautiful woman of her generation. We are told that Kō no Moronao conspired with others to trick Ben no Naishi into going on an outing so that some of his henchmen could abduct her for him. Fortuitously happening upon the attempted kidnapping, Masatsura was able to thwart it, and the Southern Court's emperor, Go-Murakami, offered him Ben no Naishi's hand in marriage as a reward. Masatsura is said to have declined on the grounds that he was destined for an early death. (Alternative versions of the story recounted in other sources give different reasons, such as his mother's opposition to the match, and there is also a tradition that Ben no Naishi became a Buddhist nun following Masatsura's death.)

Before he died, Masatsura composed a death poem on the Nyoirin-ji temple door in Yoshino, the location of Go-Daigo's tomb:

帰へらじと
兼ねて思へば
梓弓
亡き数に入る
名をぞとどむる

kaeraji to
kanete omoeba
azusayumi
nakikazu ni iru
na wo zotodomuru

I could not return, I presume
So I will keep my name
Among those who are dead with bows.

== In popular culture ==
In Equinox Flower (彼岸花, Higanbana), a 1958 color Japanese film directed by Yasujirō Ozu, one of the characters declaims a poem "based on a death poem of patriot Kusunoki Masatsura". Whether it has to do with the above poem is unknown.

An approximate translation is :

My father's precepts are engraved in my heart.
I will faithfully follow the emperor's edict.
10 years of patience, and finally the time has come.
Strike a powerful blow
for the emperor's cause we are struggling now.
To fight and die as men, we make an oath.
We, 143 companions of war, united as one,
determined to fight until victory, yes, we are.
By dying, heroes earn an immortal glory,
the cowards suffer an eternal shame.
With the edges of our arrows, we engrave our story,
the blades of our swords shine in the evening.
Against the approaching enemy, let's walk with the same step,
At their general, let's give the final blow.
