= Arahata =

Arahata may refer to:

== People ==
- Kanson Arahata (荒畑 寒村; 1887–1981), Japanese labor leader, politician and writer

== Places ==
- Arahata Fuji Shrine, Tokorozawa, Japan
- Arahata Station, a metro station in Nagoya, Japan

== See also ==
- Arahat(ta), Pali, a full awakened person, "Perfect One".
- Arihant (Jainism), a philosophical concept
