= Tokyo Metropolitan Road and Saitama Prefectural Road Route 4 =

Road in Tokyo and Saitama Prefecture, Japan

Tokyo Metropolitan Road and Saitama Prefectural Road Route 4 東京都道・埼玉県道4号東京所沢線

Route information
- Length: 29.2 km (18.1 mi)

Major junctions
- From: Shinjuku, Tokyo
- To: Tokorozawa, Saitama

Location
- Country: Japan

Highway system
- National highways of Japan; Expressways of Japan

Tokyo Metropolitan Road and Saitama Prefectural Road Route 4 (東京都道・埼玉県道4号東京所沢線, Tōkyōto-dō Saitama kendō 4-gō Tōkyō Tokorozawa-sen) is a principle local road that stretches from Shinjuku, Tokyo to Tokorozawa, Saitama. Most of the sections are located in Tokyo.

== Route description ==
Tokyo Metropolitan Road and Saitama Prefectural Road Route 4 has a total length of 29.2 kilometers (18.1 mi). The Tokyo and Saitama sections of the road have a length of 24,870 and 4,329 m respectively.
