= Namiki, Tokorozawa, Saitama =

Area in Tokorozawa, Saitama, Japan

Coordinates: 35.799°N 139.468°E

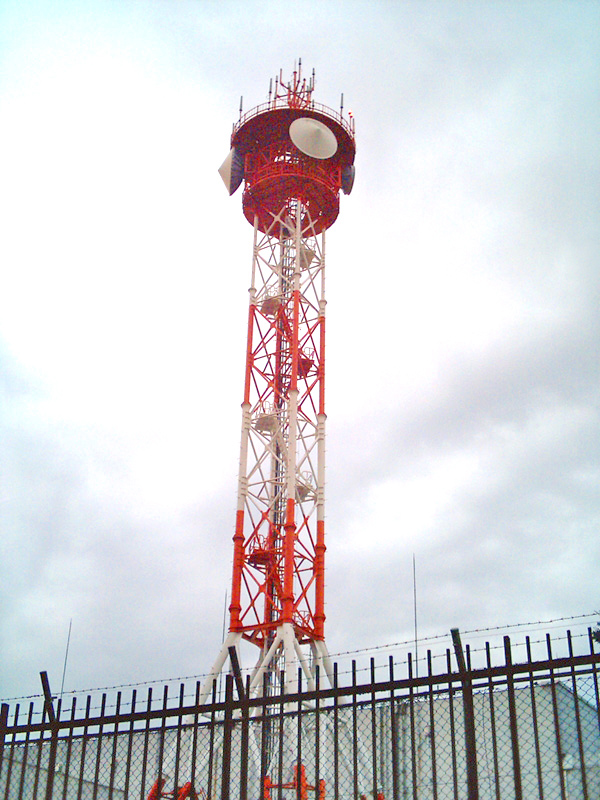
Communication tower of the Tokyo Area Control Center

Namiki (並木) is an area in Tokorozawa, Saitama Prefecture, Japan.

Namiki houses the Tokyo Area Control Center.

== Transportation ==
=== Railway ===
Seibu Railway - Seibu Shinjuku Line

- Kōkū-kōen
