= 2001 Japan Airlines mid-air incident =

2001 mid-air incident in Japan

2001 Japan Airlines mid-air incident Japan Airlines Flight 907 · Japan Airlines Flight 958
Mid-air incident
- Date: 31 January 2001
- Summary: Near miss, Air traffic controller error
- Site: Near Yaizu, Shizuoka, Japan; 35°N 138°E
- Total fatalities: 0
- Total injuries: 100
- Total survivors: 677

First aircraft
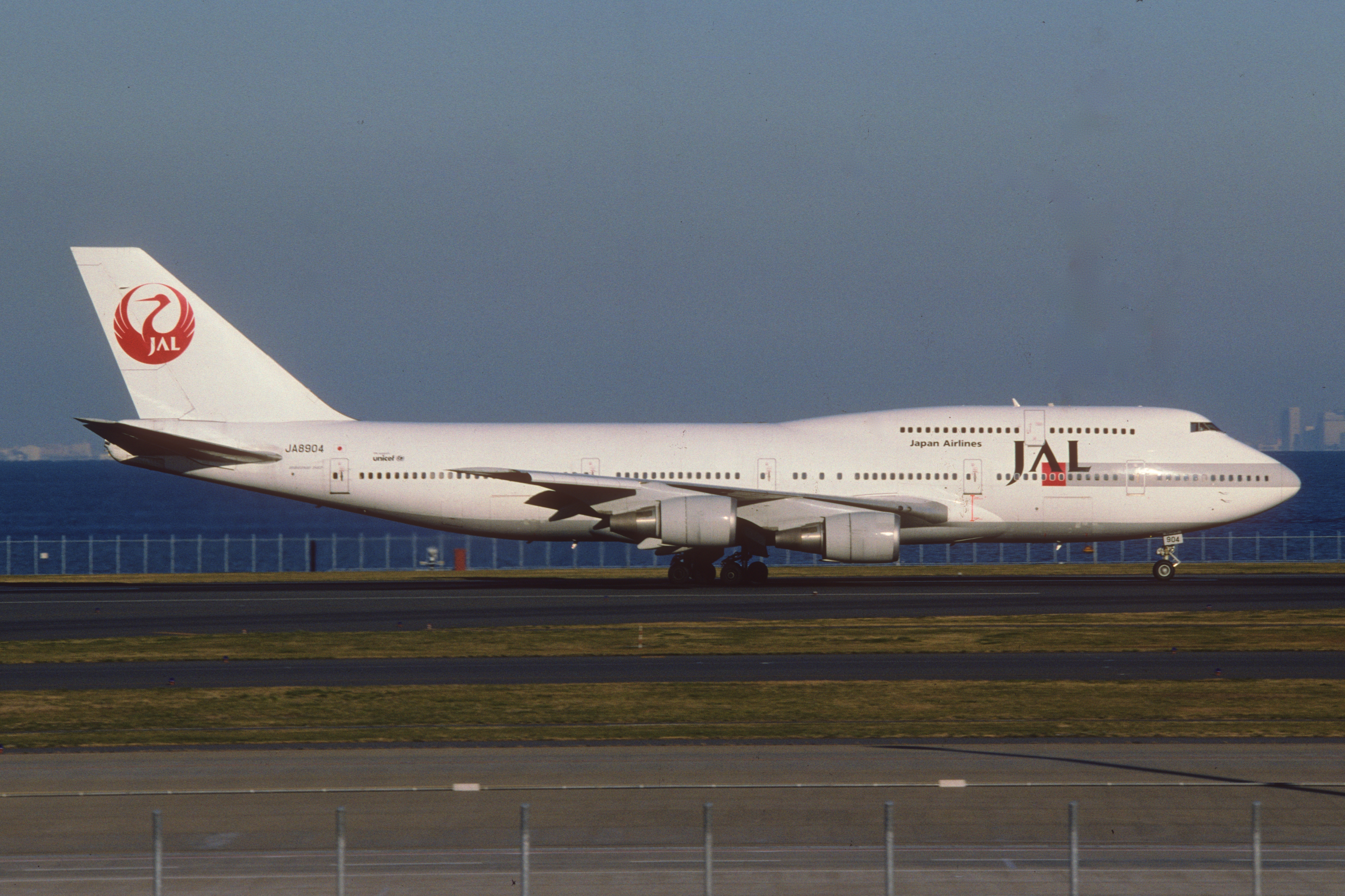
- JA8904, the Boeing 747-446D involved in the incident
- Type: Boeing 747-446D
- Operator: Japan Airlines
- IATA flight No.: JL907
- ICAO flight No.: JAL907
- Call sign: JAPAN AIR 907
- Registration: JA8904
- Flight origin: Haneda Airport, Tokyo, Japan
- Destination: Naha International Airport, Okinawa, Japan
- Occupants: 427
- Passengers: 411
- Crew: 16
- Fatalities: 0
- Injuries: 100
- Survivors: 427

Second aircraft
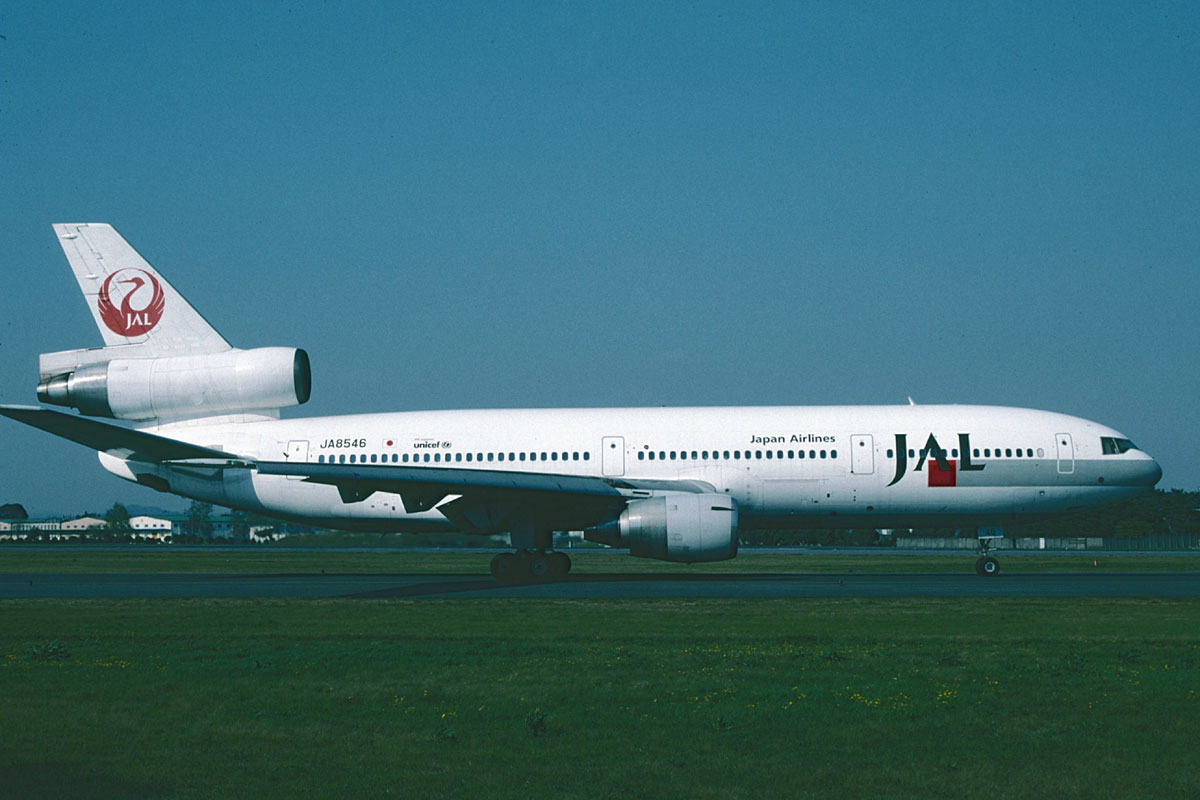
- JA8546, the McDonnell Douglas DC-10-40 involved in the incident
- Type: McDonnell Douglas DC-10-40
- Operator: Japan Airlines
- IATA flight No.: JL958
- ICAO flight No.: JAL958
- Call sign: JAPAN AIR 958
- Registration: JA8546
- Flight origin: Gimhae International Airport, Busan, South Korea
- Destination: Narita International Airport, Tokyo, Japan
- Occupants: 250
- Passengers: 237
- Crew: 13
- Fatalities: 0
- Injuries: 0
- Survivors: 250

On 31 January 2001, Japan Airlines Flight 907, a Boeing 747-400 en route from Haneda Airport, Japan, to Naha Airport, Okinawa, narrowly avoided a mid-air collision with Japan Airlines Flight 958, a McDonnell Douglas DC-10 en route from Gimhae International Airport, South Korea, to Narita International Airport, Japan. The event became known in Japan as the Japan Airlines near miss incident above Suruga Bay (日本航空機駿河湾上空ニアミス事故, Nihonkōkūki surugawan jōkū niamisu jiko).

The incident was attributed to errors made by air traffic controller (ATC) trainee Hideki Hachitani (蜂谷 秀樹, Hachitani Hideki) and trainee supervisor Yasuko Momii (籾井 康子, Momii Yasuko). The incident caused Japanese authorities to call upon the International Civil Aviation Organization (ICAO) to take measures to prevent similar incidents from occurring.

== Flight information ==
=== Boeing aircraft and crew ===
The Boeing 747-446 Domestic, registered as JA8904 (First flew and Delivered to Japan Airlines in 1992), was operating Flight 907 from Tokyo Haneda International Airport to Naha Airport with 411 passengers and 16 crew. The flight departed Haneda airport at 15:36 local time. Flight 907 was commanded by 40-year-old pilot Makoto Watanabe (渡辺 誠, Watanabe Makoto).

=== McDonnell Douglas aircraft and crew ===
The McDonnell Douglas DC-10-40, registered as JA8546 (First flew in 1980, and delivered to Japan Airlines in 1981), was operating Flight 958 from Gimhae International Airport to Narita International Airport with 237 passengers and 13 crew. Flight 958 was commanded by 45-year-old pilot Tatsuyuki Akazawa (赤沢 達幸, Akazawa Tatsuyuki).

According to the flight plan, both aircraft were supposed to pass each other while 2,000 feet (610 m) apart.

== Mid-air incident ==
The mid-air incident occurred as flight attendants began to serve drinks onboard Flight 907. JA8904's traffic collision avoidance system (TCAS) sounded 20 minutes after its departure as the jet climbed towards 39,000 feet (11,887 m). The DC-10, JA8546, cruised at 37,000 feet (11,278 m). The TCAS on both aircraft functioned correctly; a "CLIMB" instruction was issued to Flight 907. However, the flight crew received contradicting instructions from the flight controller at the Tokyo Area Control Center in Tokorozawa, Saitama Prefecture. Flight 907 followed an order to descend issued by the flight controller while Flight 958 descended as instructed by the TCAS, meaning that the planes remained on a collision course.

The trainee for the aerospace sector, 26-year-old Hideki Hachitani (蜂谷 秀樹, Hachitani Hideki), handled ten other flights at the time of the near miss. Hachitani intended to tell Flight 958 to descend. Instead, at 15:54, he told Flight 907 to descend. When the trainee noticed that JAL 958 cruised at a level altitude instead of descending, the trainee asked JAL 958 to turn right; the message did not get through to the JAL 958 pilot. The trainee's supervisor, Yasuko Momii (籾井 康子, Momii Yasuko), ordered "JAL 957" to climb, intending to tell JAL 907 to climb. There was not a JAL flight 957 in the sky at the moment of the incident, but it can be inferred that by "957" she meant flight 907.

The crew of Flight 907 avoided the collision by using an evasive manoeuvre once the aircraft were in visual proximity, and they passed within about 135 metres (443 ft) of each other. (Note: The closest passing distance was estimated by the investigation team from an analysis of the TCAS logs.) An unidentified passenger told NHK, "I have never seen a plane fly so close. I thought we were going to crash." Alex Turner, a passenger on Flight 907 and a student at Kadena High School, estimated that the avoidance manoeuvre lasted for two seconds.

Seven passengers and two crew members of the 747 sustained serious injuries; additionally, 81 passengers and 10 crew members reported minor injuries. Some unbelted passengers, flight attendants, and drink carts hit the ceiling, dislodging some ceiling tiles. The manoeuvre threw one boy across four rows of seats. Most of the injuries to occupants consisted of bruising. The maneuvers broke the leg of a 54-year-old woman. In addition, a drink cart spilled, scalding some passengers. No passengers on the DC-10 sustained injuries. Flight 907, with the 747's cabin bearing minor damage and injuries, returned to Haneda, and made an emergency landing at 16:44. Flight 958 continued to Narita Airport, landing normally at 16:32.

== Aftermath ==
JAL907 injury chart

By 18:00 on 1 February, eight Flight 907 passengers remained hospitalized, while 22 injured passengers had been released. Two passengers remained hospitalized at Kamata General Hospital, while two other passengers remained hospitalized at Ichikawa No. 2 Hospital. In addition, the following hospitals each had one passenger remaining: Takano Hospital, Kitasato University, Horinaka Hospital, and Tokyo Rosai Hospital. All injured passengers recovered.

JAL sent apology letters to the passengers on the 747; injured passengers directly received messages, and uninjured passengers received messages via the mail.

In its report on the accident, published in July 2002, the Aircraft and Railway Accidents Investigation Commission called on the International Civil Aviation Organization (ICAO) to make it clear that TCAS advisories should always take precedence over ATC instructions. A similar recommendation was made three months later by Germany's accident investigation body (the BFU) in light of the 2002 Überlingen mid-air collision. ICAO accepted these recommendations and amended its regulations in November 2003.

=== Criminal investigation and trial ===
The Tokyo Metropolitan Police Department and Ministry of Land, Infrastructure and Transport investigated the incident.

In May 2003, Tokyo police filed an investigative report concerning Hideki Hachitani (ATC trainee), Yasuko Momii (ATC Supervisor), and Makoto Watanabe (pilot of flight 907), suspecting them of professional negligence. In March 2004, prosecutors indicted Hachitani and Momii for professional negligence.

Hachitani, then 30 years old, and Momii, then 35 years old, pleaded not guilty to the charges at Tokyo District Court in 2004. During the same year, the lawyer for Hachitani and Momii said that the pilots of the aircraft bore the responsibility for the near miss.

By 16 November 2005, 12 trials had been held since the initial hearing on 9 September 2004. The prosecution argued that the two defendants neglected to provide proper separation for the two aircraft, the instructions issued were inappropriate, and that the supervisor failed to correct the trainee. The defense argued that the lack of separation would not immediately have led to a near miss, that the instructions issued were appropriate, that the TCAS procedure was not proper, and that the Computer Navigation Fix (CNF) had faulty data.

In 2006, prosecutors asked for Hachitani, then 31, to be sentenced to ten years in prison and for Momii, then 37, to be sentenced to 15 years in prison. On 20 March 2006, the court ruled that Hachitani and Momii were not guilty of the charge. The court stated that Hachitani could not have foreseen the accident and that the mixup of the flight numbers did not have a causal relationship with the accident. Hisaharu Yasui, the presiding judge, said that prosecuting controllers and pilots would be "unsuitable" in this case. The Tokyo District Public Prosecutor's Office filed an appeal with the Tokyo High Court on March 31. During the same year, the Japanese government agreed to pay Japan Airlines and Tokio Marine & Nichido Fire Insurance a total of ¥82.4 million to compensate for the near miss (equivalent to ¥93.6 million in 2024).

On 11 April 2008, on appeal, a higher court overturned the decision and found Hachitani and Momii guilty. The presiding judge, Masaharu Suda sentenced Hachitani, then 33, to 12 months imprisonment, and Momii, then 39, to 18 months imprisonment, with both sentences suspended for 3 years. The lawyers representing the controllers appealed, but the convictions were upheld on 26 October 2010, by the Supreme Court.

== In popular culture ==
The events of the incident are documented in the final season 3 episode of the Discovery Channel documentary Aircrash Confidential. The episode was first aired on 20 August 2018.

== See also ==
- 2002 Überlingen mid-air collision, mid-air collision in 2002 also attributed to conflicting ATC and TCAS messages
- 1996 Charkhi Dadri mid-air collision
