= Seibu-en Velodrome =

Velodrome in Tokorozawa, Saitama, Japan

Coordinates: 35°46′10″N 139°26′49″E

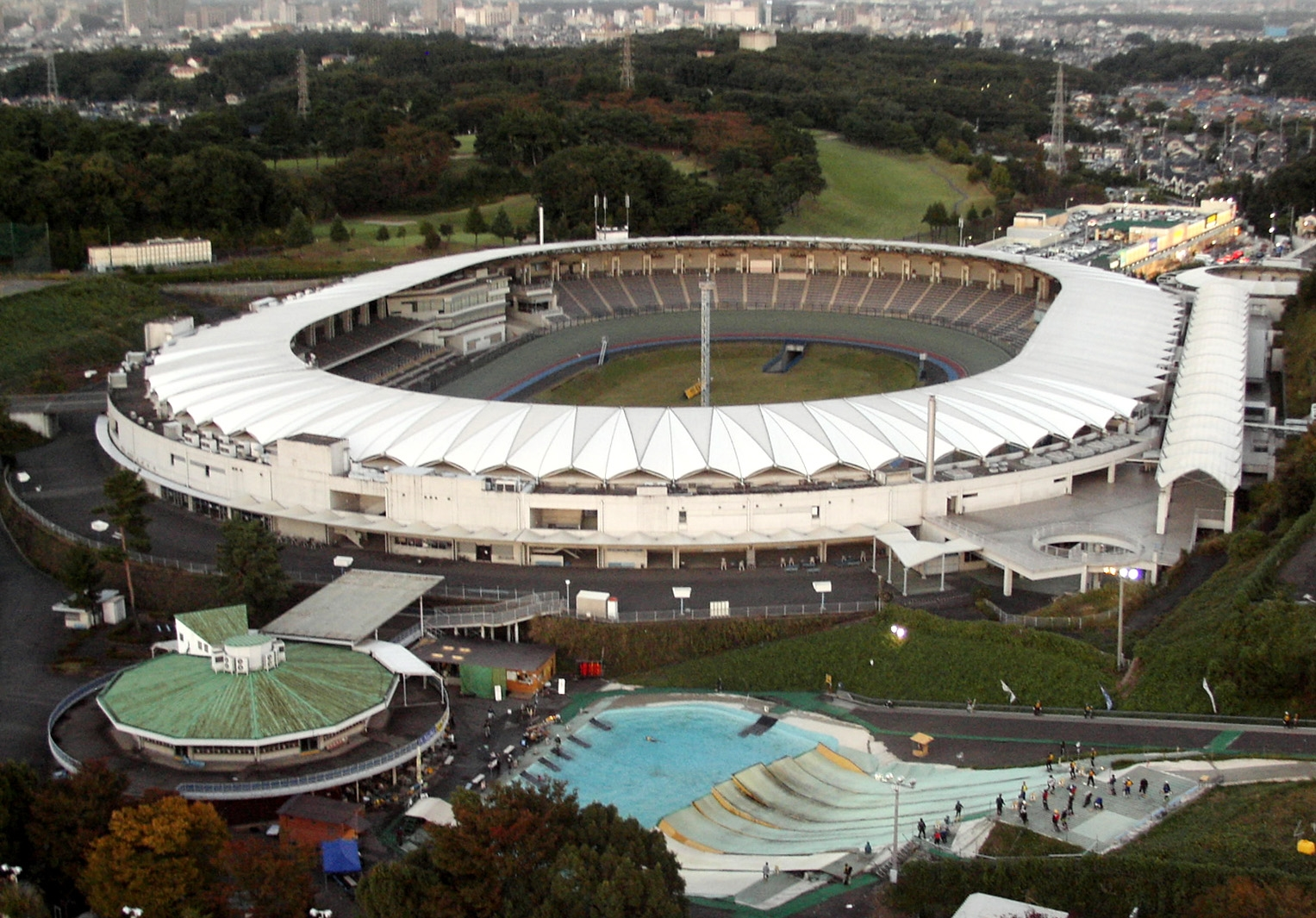
Seibu-en Velodrome

Seibu-en Velodrome (西武園競輪場, Seibuen Keirinjyō) is a velodrome located in Tokorozawa, Saitama that conducts pari-mutuel Keirin racing - one of Japan's four authorized "Public Sports" (公営競技, kōei kyōgi) where gambling is permitted. Its Keirin identification number for betting purposes is 26# (26 sharp).

Seibu-en's oval is 400 meters in circumference. A typical keirin race of 2,025 meters consists of five laps around the course.

The Seibu Railway Seibu-en Station provides direct access to the velodrome.

== See also ==
- List of cycling tracks and velodromes
