= Sayama Fudōson =

Temple in Tokorozawa, Saitama, Japan

- 不動寺
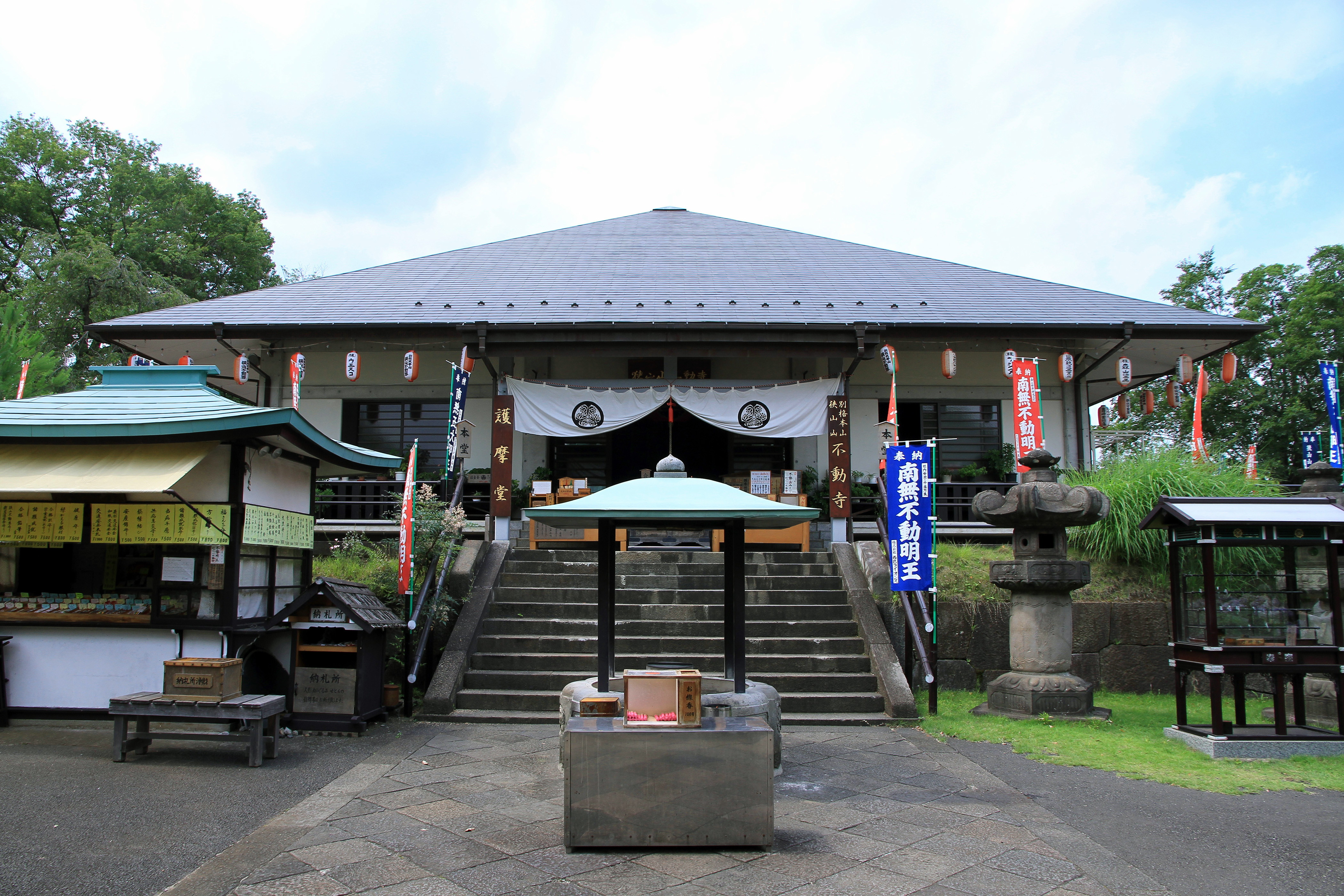
- Kondo Main Hall

Religion
- Affiliation: Tendai

Location
- Location: Tokorozawa, Saitama
- Country: Japan
- Interactive map of Sayama Fudōson
- Coordinates: 35°46′13″N 139°24′59″E

Architecture
- Founder: Yoshiaki Tsutsumi
- Completed: 1975

Sayama Fudōson (Japanese: 狭山不動尊) is a Tendai sect temple located in Kamiyamaguchi, Tokorozawa, Saitama. It is noted for it containing a number of historically significant structures that were relocated from other parts of Japan. Its mountain name is Sayamayama, and its temple name is Fudo-ji. Its principal image is Acala. It is known as the temple where the Saitama Seibu Lions hold prayers for victory every year in late March, just before the start of the season.

== History ==
From the 1940s to the 1950s, historical buildings from around Japan that had been privately collected by Yasujiro Tsutsumi were moved to this site and initially exhibited as part of the UNESCO Village.

In 1975, with the help of Kan'ei-ji Temple, who was close to Yoshiaki Tsutsumi of the Seibu Railway, it was founded as a special head temple of the Tendai Sect. In 2001, the main hall (Shichiken-do), relocated from Higashi Honganji Temple in Kyoto, was burned down in a suspicious fire.

== Temple grounds ==
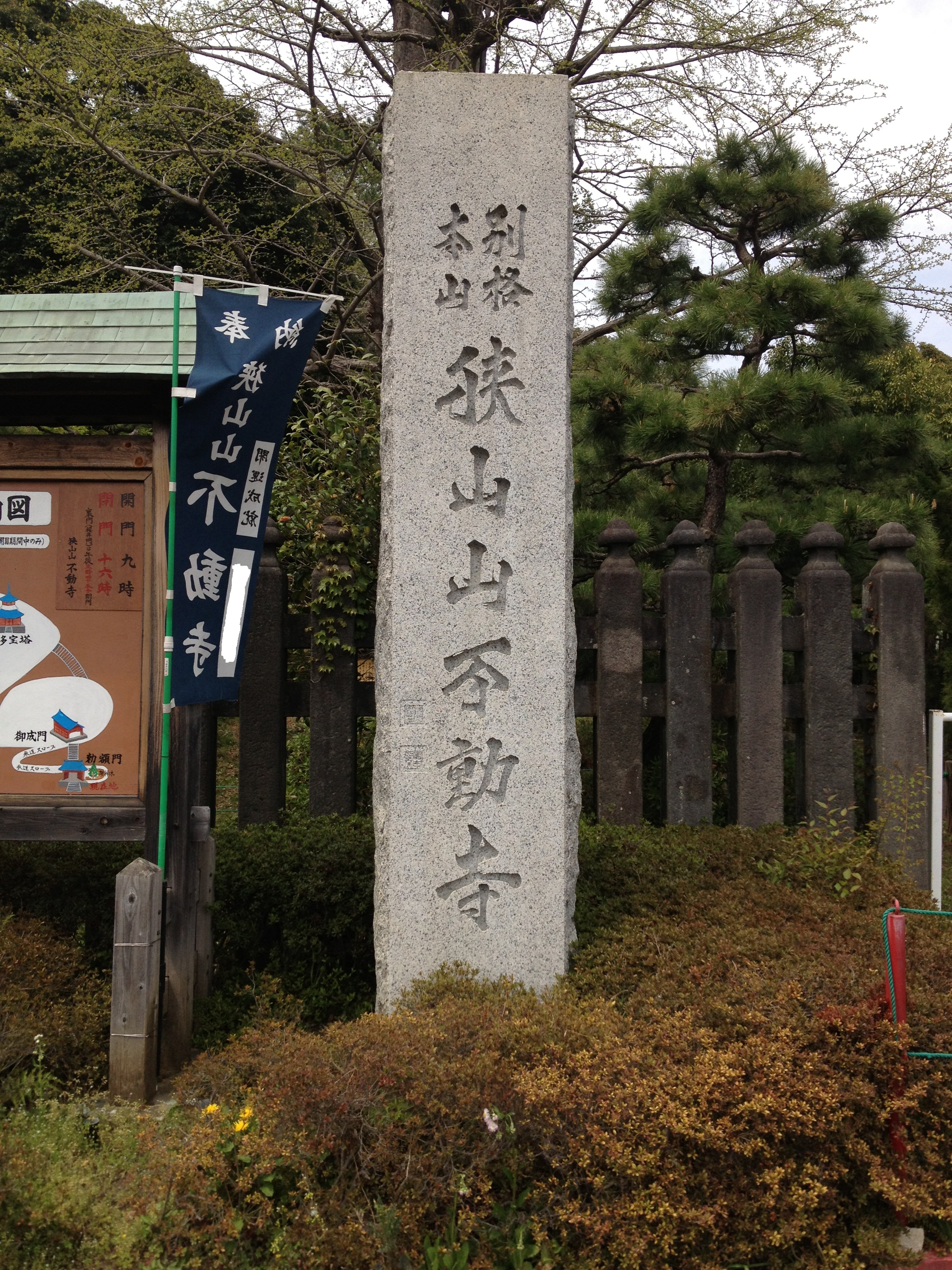
Stone Pillar

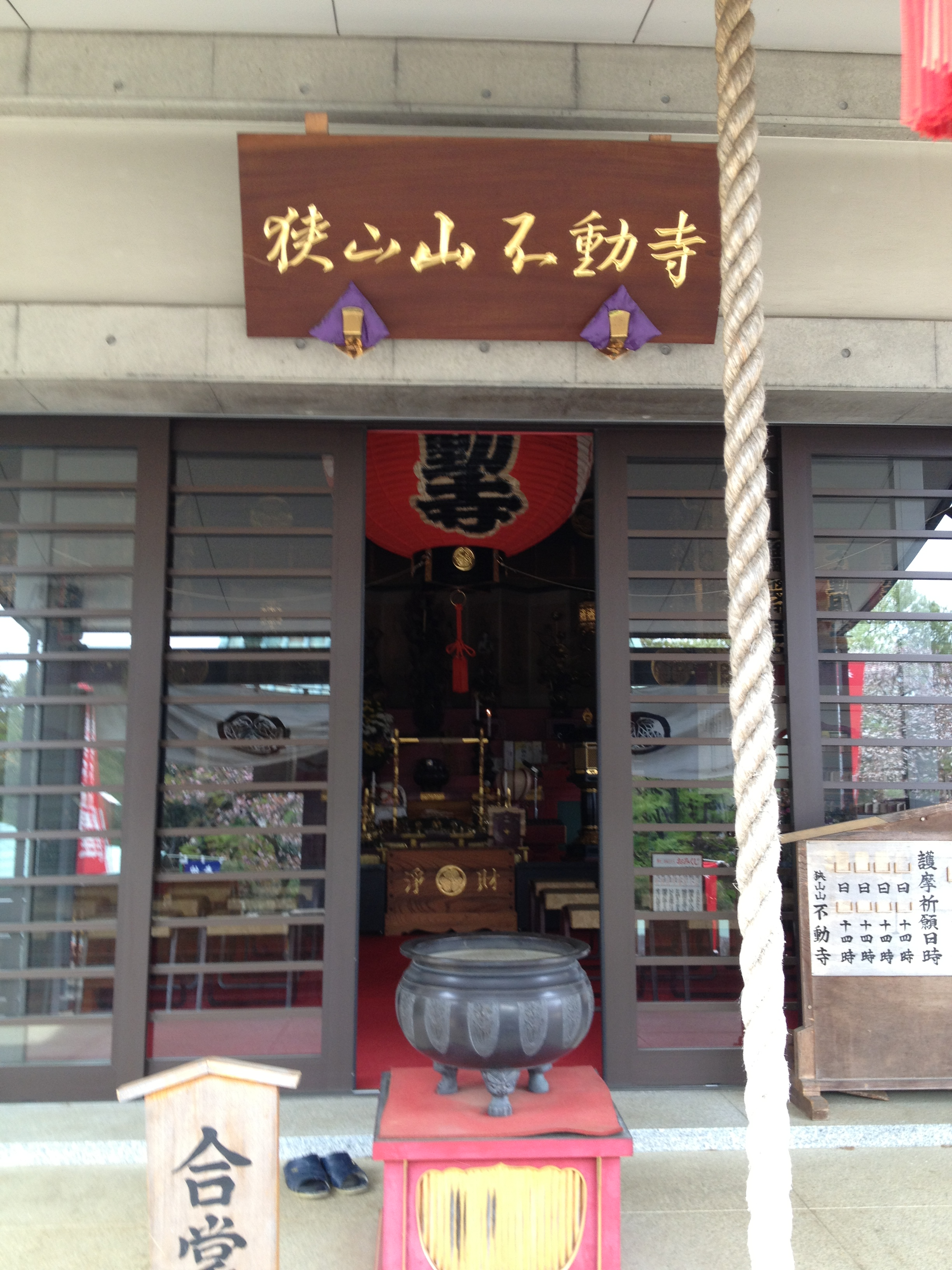
Main hall plaque

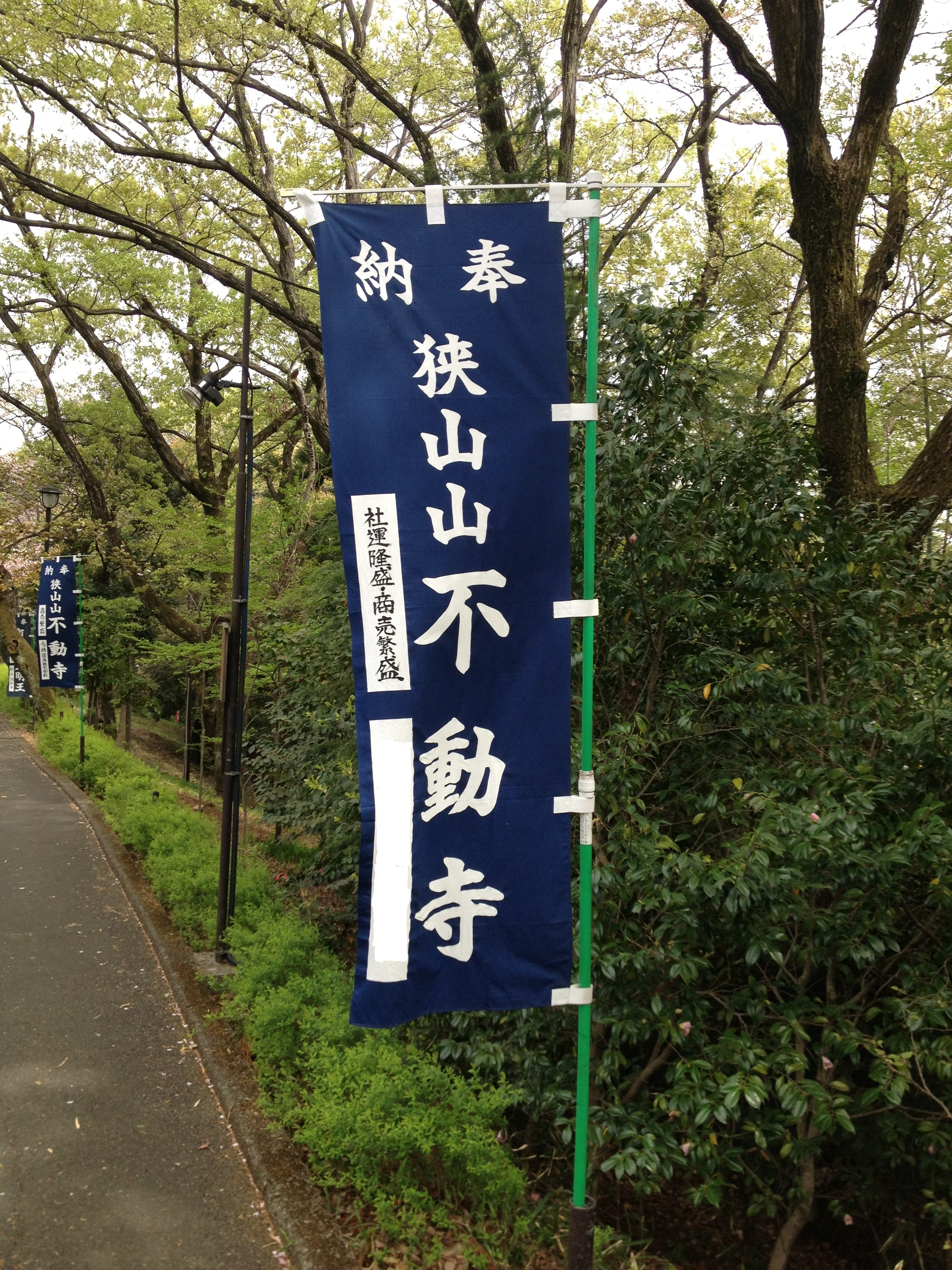
Banner with the temple name in Japanese

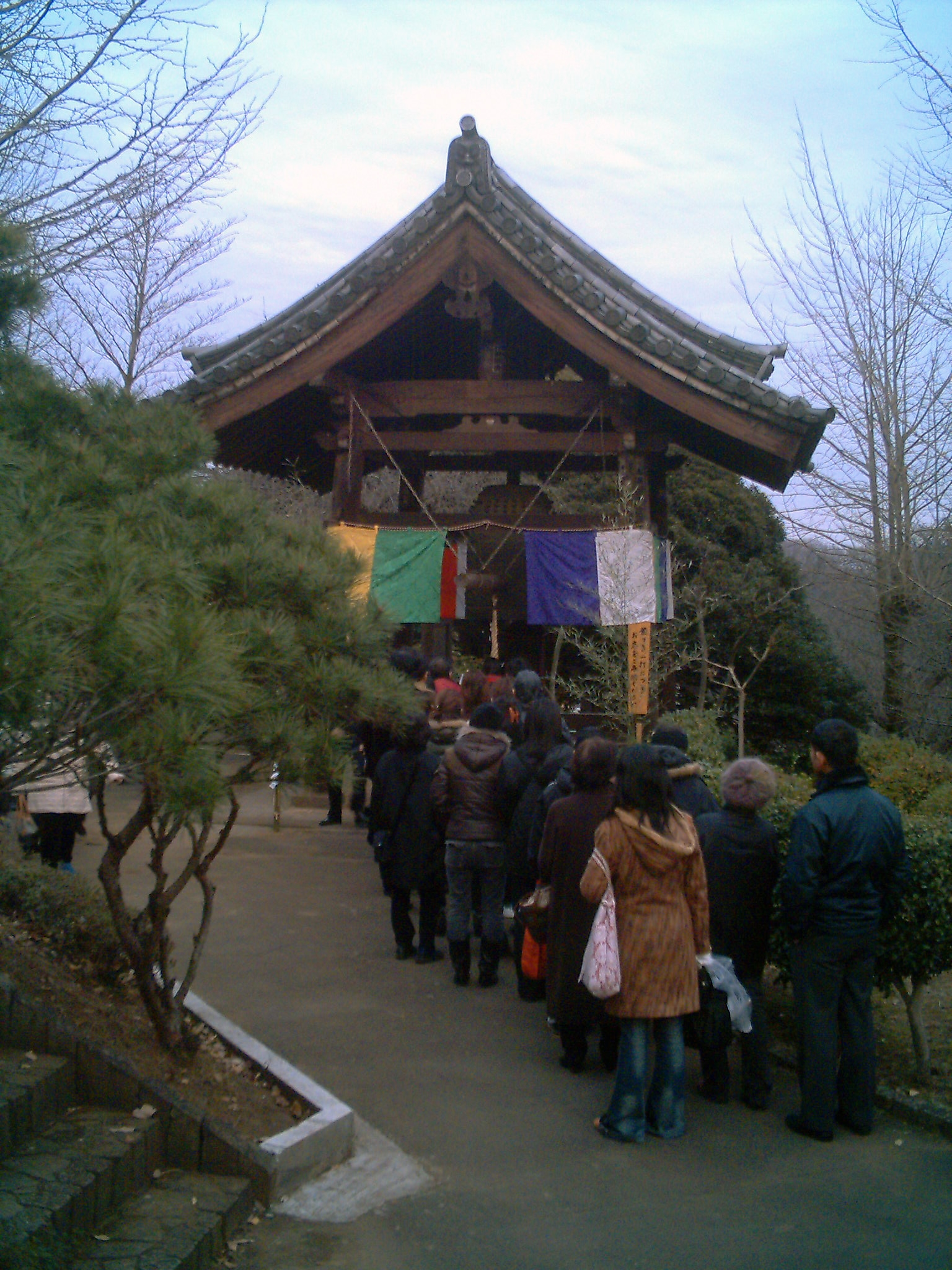
Temple Bell

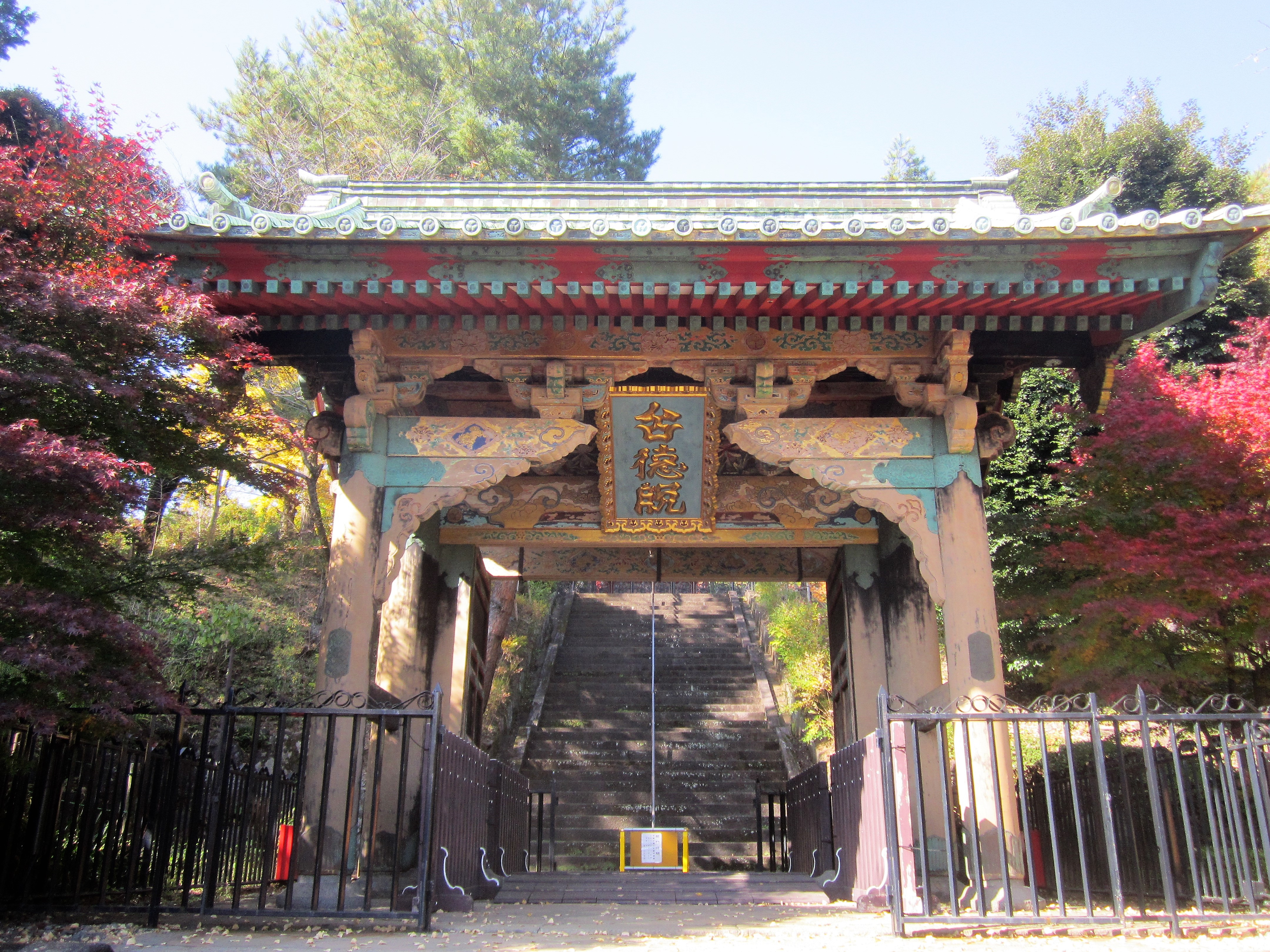
Former Taitoku-in Mausoleum Imperial Plaque Gate (Important Cultural Property, relocated from Minato Ward, Tokyo)

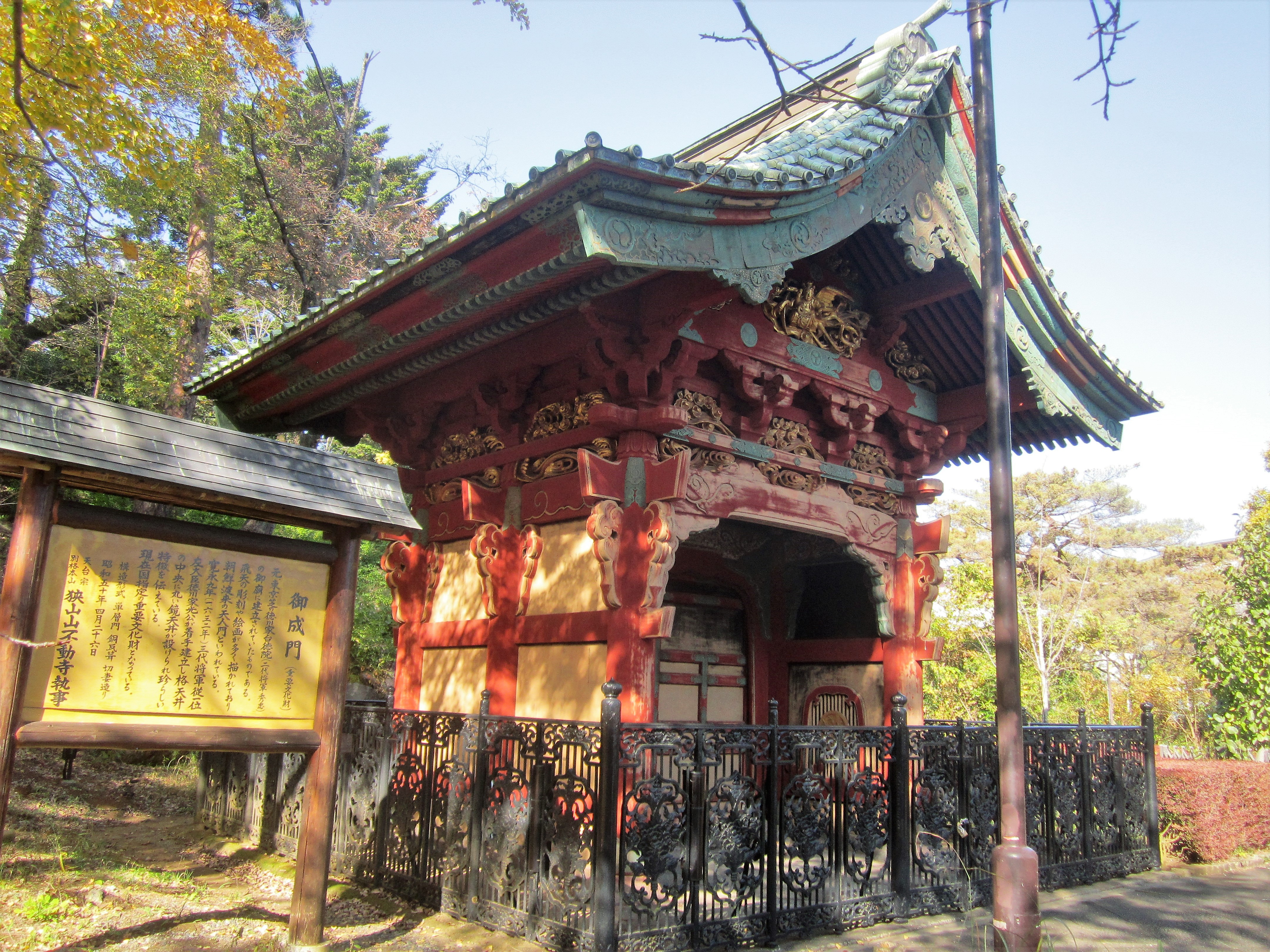
Former Taitoku-in Mausoleum Onarimon Gate (Important Cultural Property, relocated from Minato Ward, Tokyo)

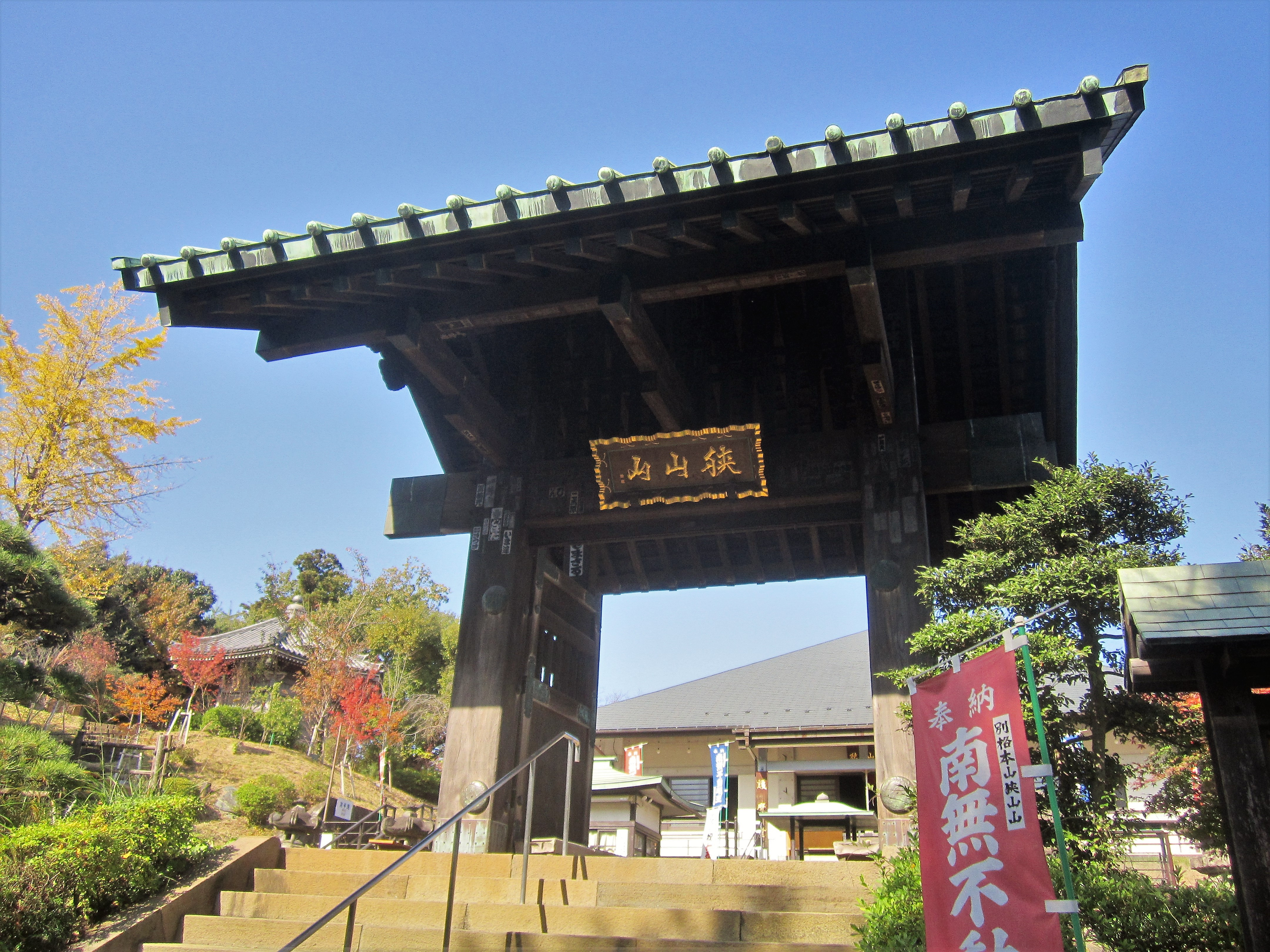
Temple Main Gate

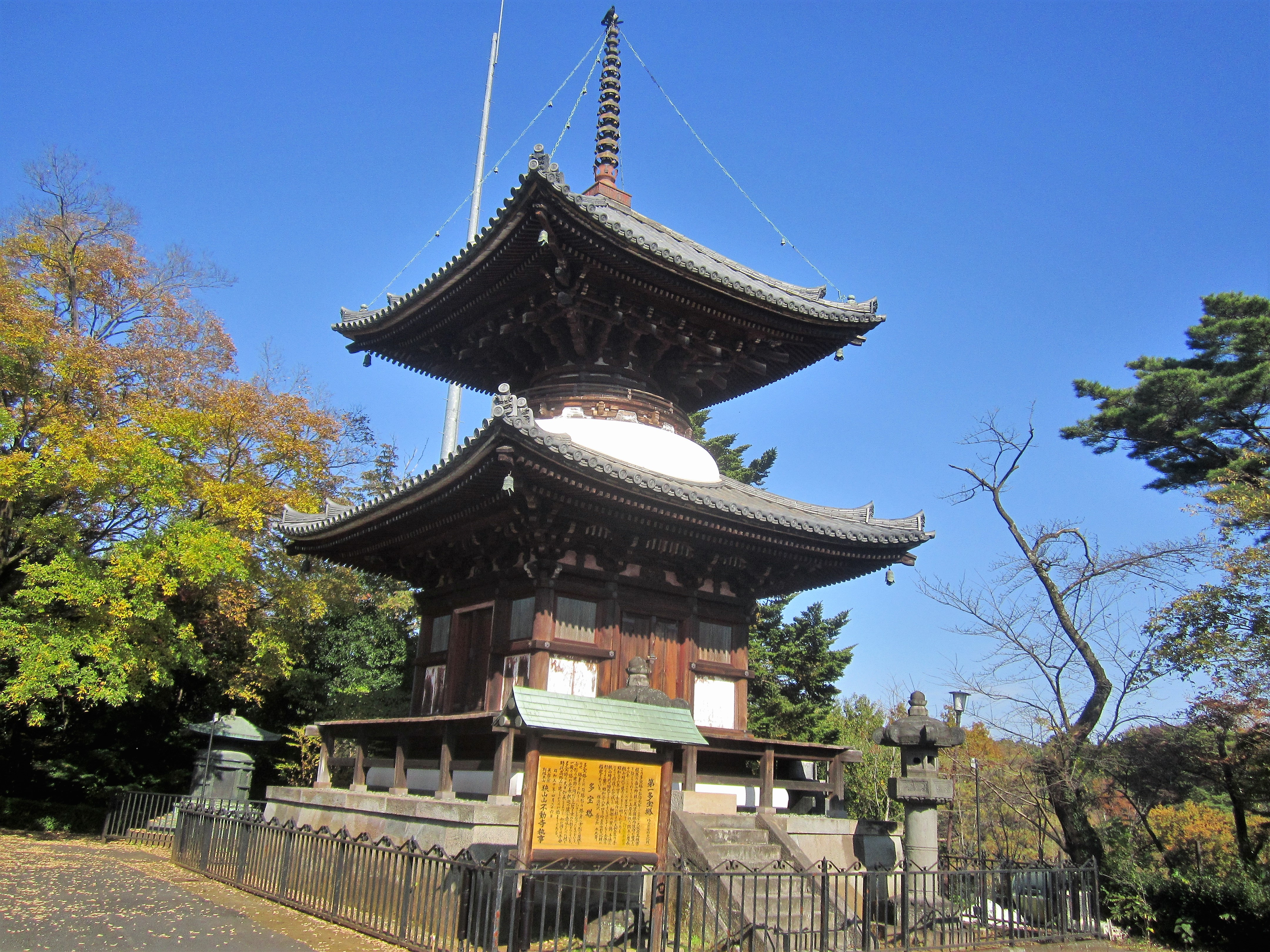
Temple Pagoda

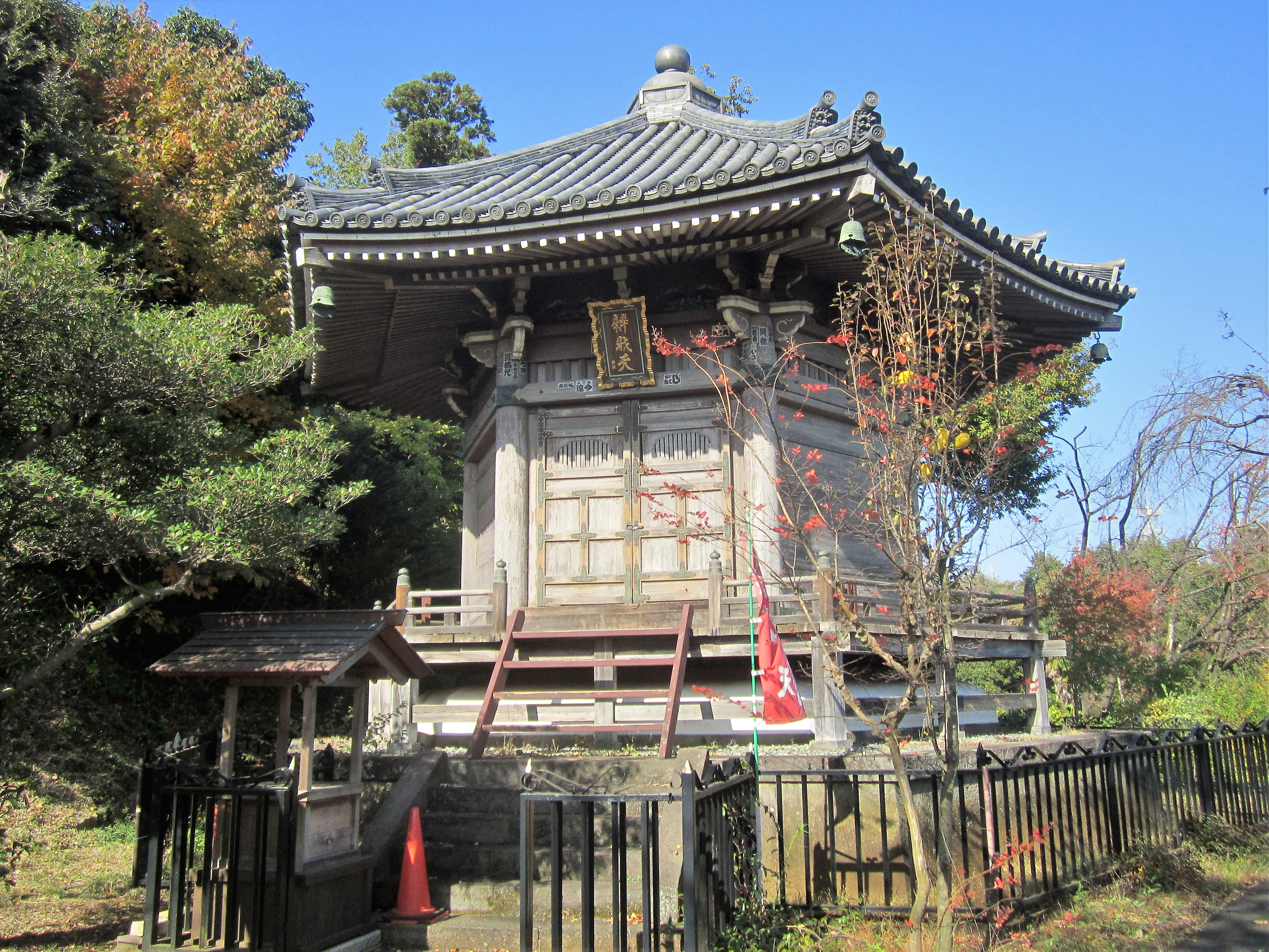
Benten-dō

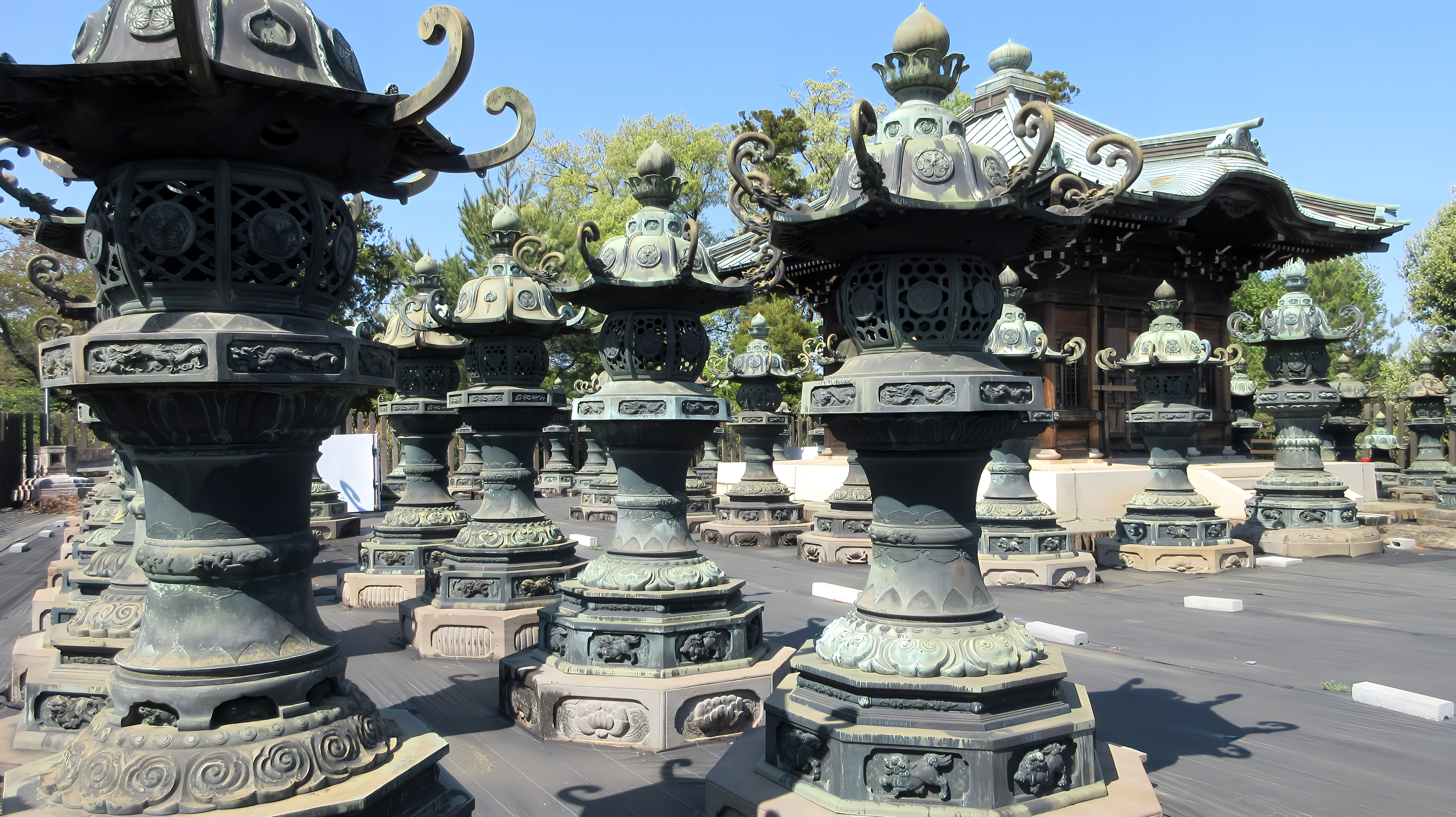
Copper lantern in front of the Rakan-do Hall

== Cultural importance ==
The Former Taitoku-in Mausoleum Imperial Plaque Gate, Chojimon Gate, and Onarimon Gate: All three buildings were originally part of the Taitoku-in Tokugawa Hidetada mausoleum at Zojo-ji Temple in Shiba Park, Minato Ward, Tokyo. In 1963, they were moved from Zojo-ji Temple to what was then the UNESCO Village (a theme park, now closed). Part of the UNESCO Village grounds is now the site of Sayama Fudoson.
