= Akikusa Gakuen Junior College =

Private junior college in Tokorozawa, Saitama, Japan

Coordinates: 35°48′6.3″N 139°27′38.1″E

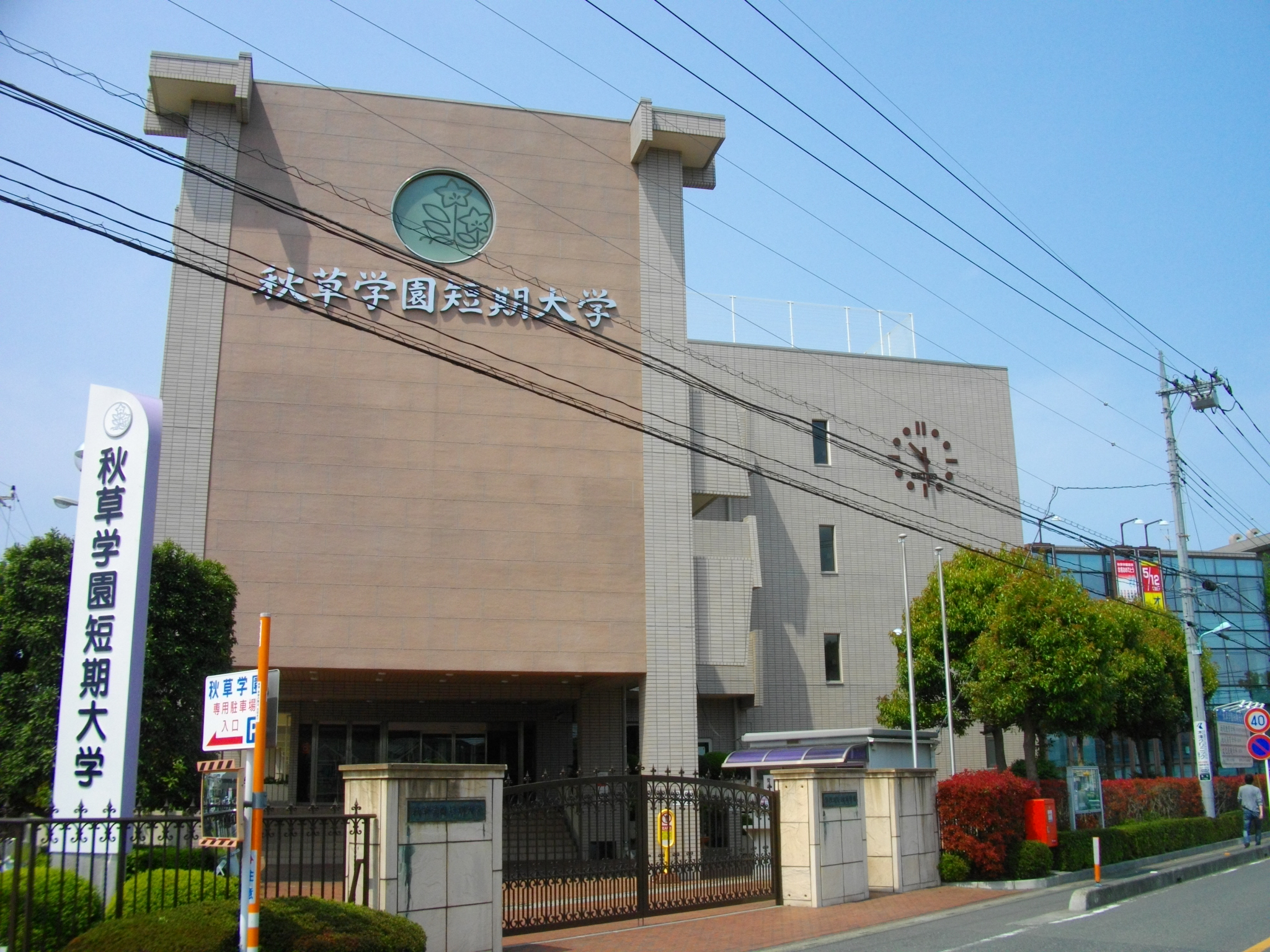
Akikusa Gakuen Junior College

Akikusa Gakuen Junior College (秋草学園短期大学, Akikusa gakuen tanki daigaku) is a private junior college in Tokorozawa, Saitama, Japan, established in 1979. The predecessor of the school was founded in 1949.

== Alumni ==
- Akie Yoshizawa, actress and singer, a former member of Onyanko Club.
