= Tokorozawa Shinmei Shrine =

Shinto shrine in Saitama Prefecture, Japan

Tokorozawa Shinmei Shrine 所澤神明社
- Tokorozawa Shinmei Shrine During New Years

- Location within Japan

Religion
- Affiliation: Shinto
- Deity: Amaterasu
- Type: Shimmei Shrine

Location
- Location: 1-2-4 Miyamoto-chō, Tokorozawa, Saitama, 359-1143
- Interactive map of Tokorozawa Shinmei Shrine 所澤神明社
- Coordinates: 35°47′38.83″N 139°27′48.01″E

Website
- www.shinmeisha.or.jp

Tokorozawa Shimei Shrine (所澤神明社, Tokorosawa shinmei-sha) is a Shinto shrine in Tokorozawa, Saitama, Japan.

== History ==
Tradition holds that the Tokorozawa Shinmei Shrine was founded in 110 CE by Yamato Takeru during his conquest of eastern Japan and the shrine claims to have been one of the most important centers for the worship of Amaterasu in the Kantō region; however, all records were lost in a fire in 1826. With the establishment of the Imperial Japanese Army’s Tokorozawa Air Field in 1911, pioneering pilot Yoshitoshi Tokugawa began a tradition of praying at this shrine for air safety.

== Enshrined kami ==
- Amaterasu Ōmikami
- Ukanomitama
- Mount Miwa

== Festivals ==
The major Japanese festivals of the shrine are:

- January 1 – Gantan-sai (New Year’s Festival)
- February 3 – Setsubun (traditional beginning of spring)
- April 21 – Chi-sai
- First Sunday in June – Ningyō-kuyō (Doll’s Day)
- June 30 - Nagoshi-no Ō-harae (Summer Purification Ceremony)
- September 15 – Tai-sai
