= Shinko-ji =

Buddhist temple in Saitama Prefecture, Japan

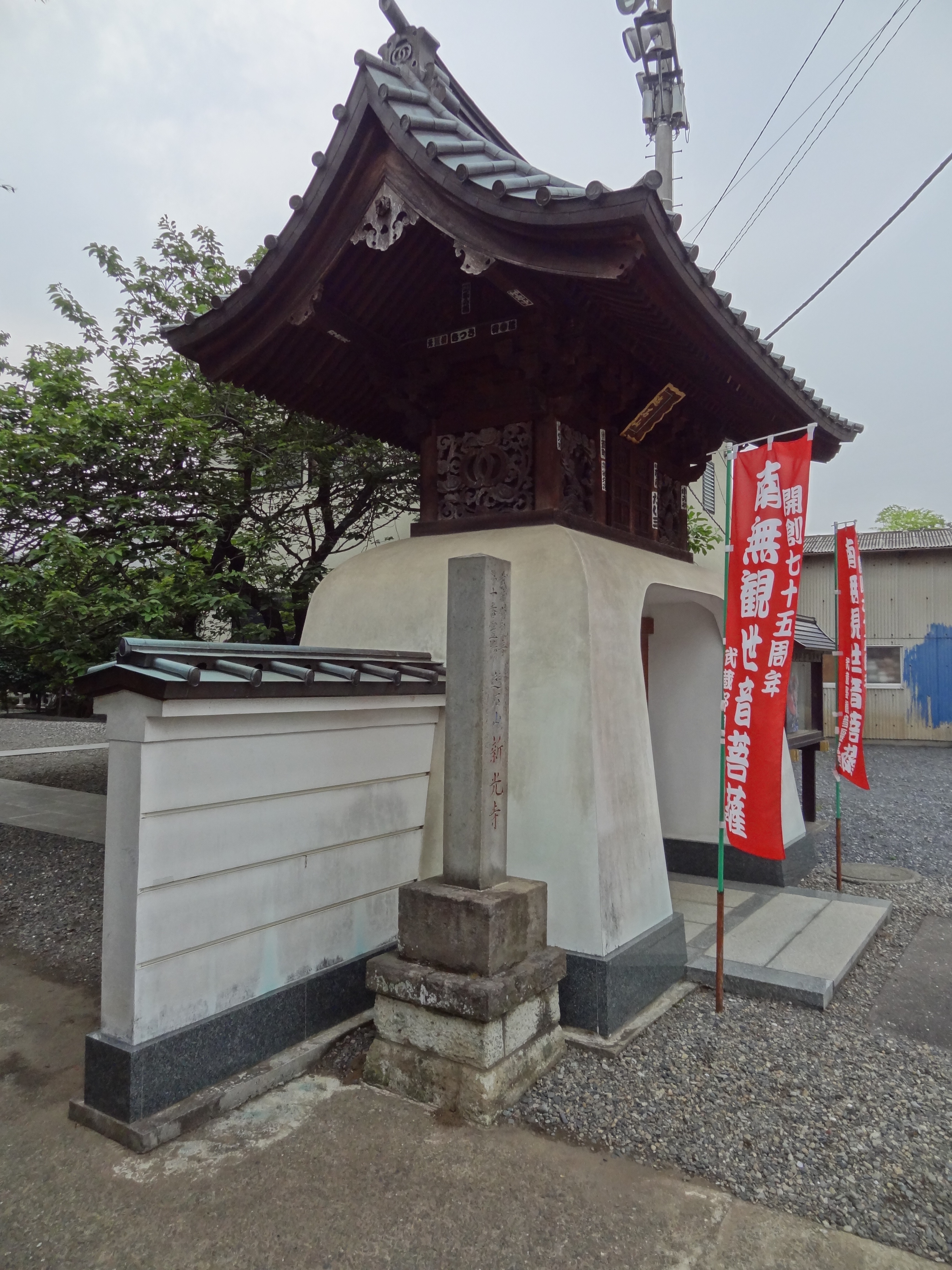
- Shinko-Ji Temple Gate

Religion
- Affiliation: Buddhism (Japanese)
- Prefecture: Saitama

Location
- Municipality: Tokorozawa, Saitama
- Interactive map of Shinko-ji
- Prefecture: Saitama
- Coordinates: 35°47′32.8734″N 139°27′43.6854″E

Shinko-ji (新光寺; "New Light Temple") is a Shingon Sect Buzan School Buddhist temple in Tokorozawa, Saitama, Japan. It is along the ancient Kamakura Kaidō road and traces its history to its founding by Minamoto no Yoritomo in 1193.

== History ==
In 1193, Minamoto no Yoritomo encamped on his way to Nasuno for falconry and subsequently contributed the camp site for building a temple. In 1333, Nitta Yoshisada stopped on his way to his Kamakura Conquest in order pray for victory and stopped off here again after his victory and contributed the land to the temple. Kaikoku Zakki, written in 1486 by quasi Empress Doko of Shogoin Temple, states that when she went to Tokorozawa she visited the temple.

== Festival ==
The Kannon festival of the temple was once noted for its horse festival and was held on February 18, the first horse day of the year. Recently, the festival is held on April 18, when it gets warmer and cherry blossoms are in bloom.

== Historical signage ==
The public signage on the temple site posted by the City of Tokorozawa has the following historical description:

SHINKO TEMPLE (TOKOROZAWA KANNON)
Yusekizan Kannon in Shinko Temple
- Buzan School Shingon Sect of Buddhism
- The Principle Image: Shokanzeon Bosatsu (Goddess of Mercy)
- The tenth in the 33 temples of the Musashino Kannon Pilgrimage
- The eighth in the 33 temples of the Sayama Kannon Pilgrimage

The legend says the temple was once called Yusekizan Kannon-in for its principle image is the statue of Sho Kanzeon Bosatsu (Avalokitesvara) made by the Great Teacher Gyoki. In 1649, the temple was authorised with the red seal of a fief yielding 6 koku (about 1082.34 liters) by the Tokugawa Shogunate. According to the record of the year 1790, the temple is described as a square shaped building whose each side was 3 ken (about 5.4m) long. It also says that the temple is derived from a thatched temple where the statue of kannon was enshrined. Since then, the temple has been worshipped by people in Tokorozawa.

The temple, located along the former Kamakura Highway, is referred in such old manuscripts as "Shinpen Musashi Fudoki-ko" 'Azamakagami" and "Edo Meisho Zue". According to them, in 1193, Minamoto Yoritomo made a camp for lunch on his way to Nasuno for falconry. He contributed the camp site for building a temple. However, then, the place became battlefields. In 1333, Nitta Yoshisada stopped off here on his way to his Kamakura Conquest in order to wish victory. After defeating the Kamakura Shogunate. He stopped off here again and contributed the land he had been deprived of before to the temple.

"Kaikoku Zakki," written in 1486 by quasi Empress Doko of Shogoin Temple says that when she went to Tokorozawa a Yamabushi (mountain priest) named Fukusen of Kannon-in appeared a took out a "tokoro" (a kind of yam) for a relish of sake. At this she made a wake (31 syllable poem) as follows:

In our outing, a yam called tokoro is served for a relish. Oh the yam dug out and got in Tokorozawa.

The Kannon festival of the temple was once famous hereabouts for its horse festival. Before the horse was appreciated as the only means of transportation. Thus to show appreciation for horses and to pray for safe traffic, the festival, also called Horse Town, was held on February 18, the first horse day of the year. On the day, horses used to go around the main hall. Recently, the festival is held on April 18 when it gets warmer and cherry blossoms are in bloom.

Festival: Kannon Festival (April 18)

TOKOROZAWA TOURIST ASSOCIATION
