= Hatogamine Hachiman Shrine =

Shintō shrine in Tokorozawa, Japan

Hatogamine Hachiman Shrine 鳩峯八幡神社
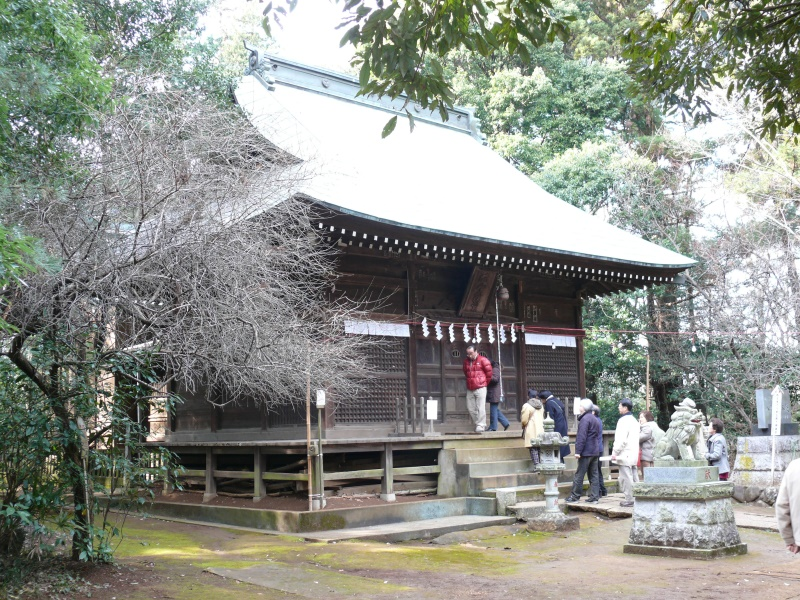
- Hatogamine Hachiman Shrine Main Hall

- Location within Japan

Religion
- Affiliation: Shinto
- Deity: Hachiman
- Type: Hachiman Shrine

Location
- Location: 6-4-1 Namiki-chō, Tokorozawa, Saitama, 359-0043
- Interactive map of Hatogamine Hachiman Shrine 鳩峯八幡神社
- Coordinates: 35°46′37″N 139°27′28″E

Architecture
- Established: 921 AD

Website
- www.city.tokorozawa.saitama.jp/iitokoro/enjoy/rekishi/shashinuturikawari/azuma/az14.html

Hatogamine Hachiman Shrine (鳩峰八幡神社, Hatogamine Hachiman Jinja) is a Shintō shrine in Tokorozawa, Saitama Prefecture, Japan. In the former Modern system of ranked Shinto shrines, it was classified as a district shrine (郷社, gōsha).

== History ==
Hatogamine Hachiman Shrine is believed to date to 921 AD as a branch of the Iwashimizu Hachimangū south of Kyoto. Shrine records state that the shrine buildings were repaired in 1232 and that in 1333 Nitta Yoshisada prayed at the shrine for victory at the start of the Kōzuke-Musashi Campaign against the Kamakura shogunate. The "Kabutokakeno Pine Tree" (兜掛松, Kabutokakeno Matsu) on the grounds is claimed to date from that time and to be where Nitta hung his helmet while praying.

In year 1591 the future Shōgun Tokugawa Ieyasu began a tradition of donating lumber for the shrine, which was maintained by subsequent shōguns until the end of the Edo period in 1867.

The main hall rests on a wooded hilltop and dates from the Muromachi period, making it one of the oldest structures in Saitama Prefecture.

Setsumatsusha include a Yasaka Shrine and a Suiten-gū shrine.

== Enshrined kami ==
- Hondawakano-mikoto
- Himegami
- Kinagatarashihimenno-mikoto

== Festivals ==
The major festivals are:

- January 1 – Gantansai (New Year's Festival)
- January 5 – Reitaisai (Annual Festival / Bodhidharma Fair)
- March 15 – Harumatsuri (Spring Festival)
- April 15 – Reitaisai (Annual Festival)
- July 15 – Natsu-Matsuri (Summer Festival)
- September 15 – Aki-matsuri (Autumn Festival)
- November 23 – Niinamesai
