= Tokyo Area Control Center =

Air traffic control center in Saitama Prefecture, Japan

Coordinates: 35°48′3.6″N 139°28′40.5″E

Map of Tokyo ACC under Fukuoka FIR

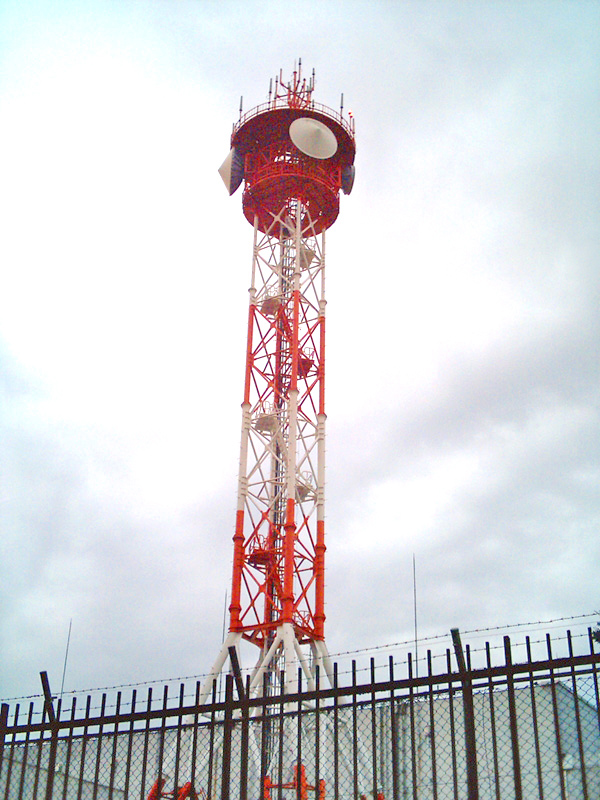
Communication tower of the Tokyo Area Control Center

Tokyo Area Control Center (Japanese: 東京航空交通管制部, Hepburn: Tōkyō Kōkūkōtsūkanseibu; "Tokyo Air Traffic Control Center") is an air traffic control center located in the Namiki area of Tokorozawa, Saitama Prefecture, Japan in the Greater Tokyo Area. The center is north of the special wards of Tokyo.

As of 2001 the center controlled airspace in the Kantō, Jōetsu, Tōhoku, Chūbu, and Hokuriku regions and a portion of the Kansai region.

== Incidents ==
On Wednesday, January 31, 2001, two Japan Airlines aircraft narrowly avoided a mid-air collision. The two airliners conflicted. Japan Airlines Flight 958, using a Douglas DC-10, descended according to traffic collision avoidance system (TCAS) instructions. A center employee told Japan Airlines Flight 907, using a Boeing 747-400, to descend while its TCAS told the pilots to climb.
