= Arahata Fuji Shrine =

Shinto shrine in Saitama Prefecture, Japan

Arahata Fuji Shrine (荒幡の富士神社)
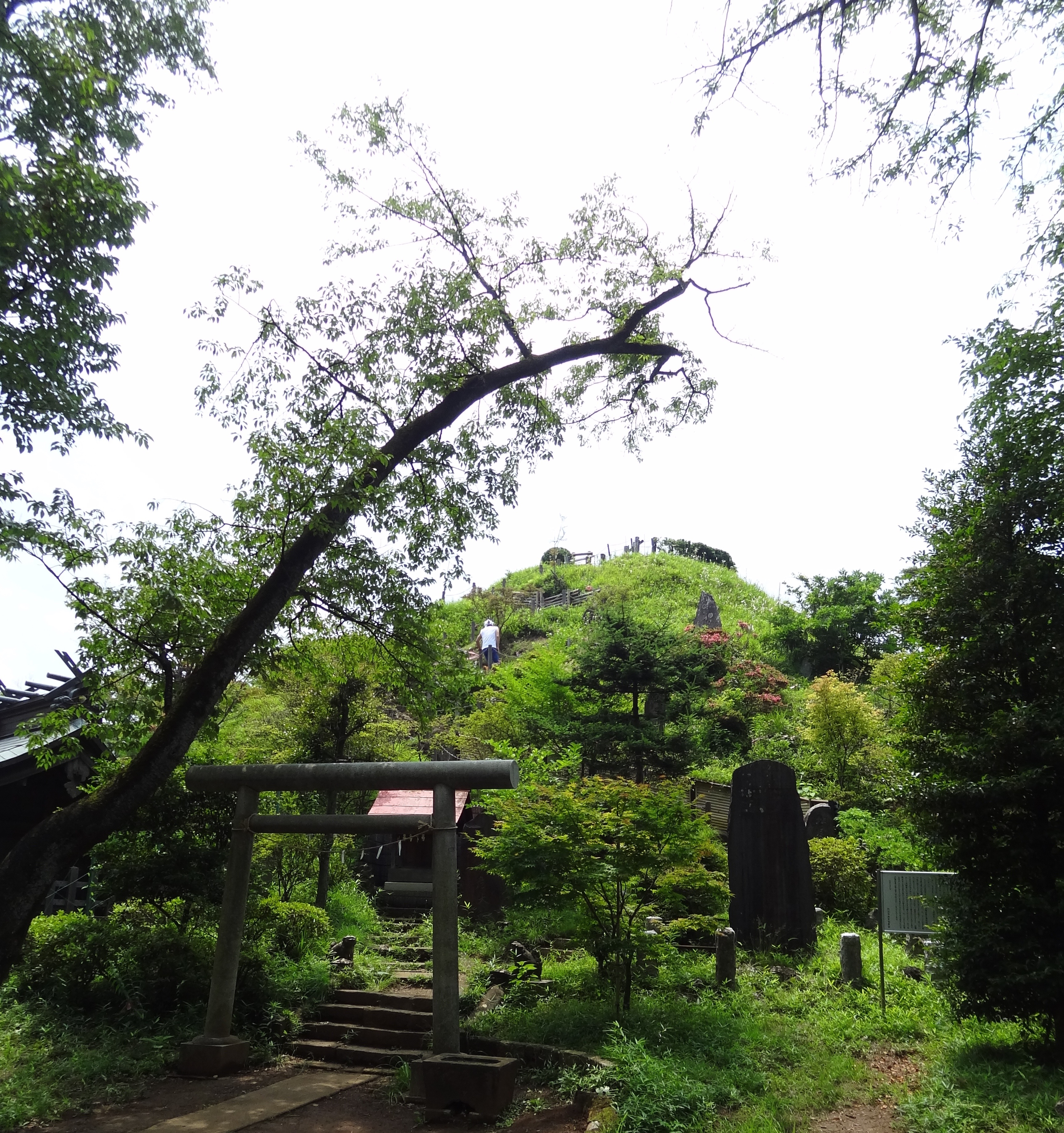
- Arahata Fuji from below

- Location within Japan

Religion
- Affiliation: Shinto

Location
- Location: Tokorozawa, Saitama
- Interactive map of Arahata Fuji Shrine (荒幡の富士神社)
- Coordinates: 35°46′25.84″N 139°26′45.01″E

Arahata Fuji Shrine (荒幡富士神社, Arahata no Fuji Jinja) is a Shintō shrine in Tokorozawa city, Saitama Prefecture, Japan. It is noteworthy as a scale reproduction of Mount Fuji that can be easily climbed and offers views of the actual Mount Fuji and surrounding areas from the top.

== History ==
Arahata Fuji was built in the 1880s by the local population at a time when visiting and climbing the actual Mount Fuji was out of the reach of most Japanese.

== Gallery ==
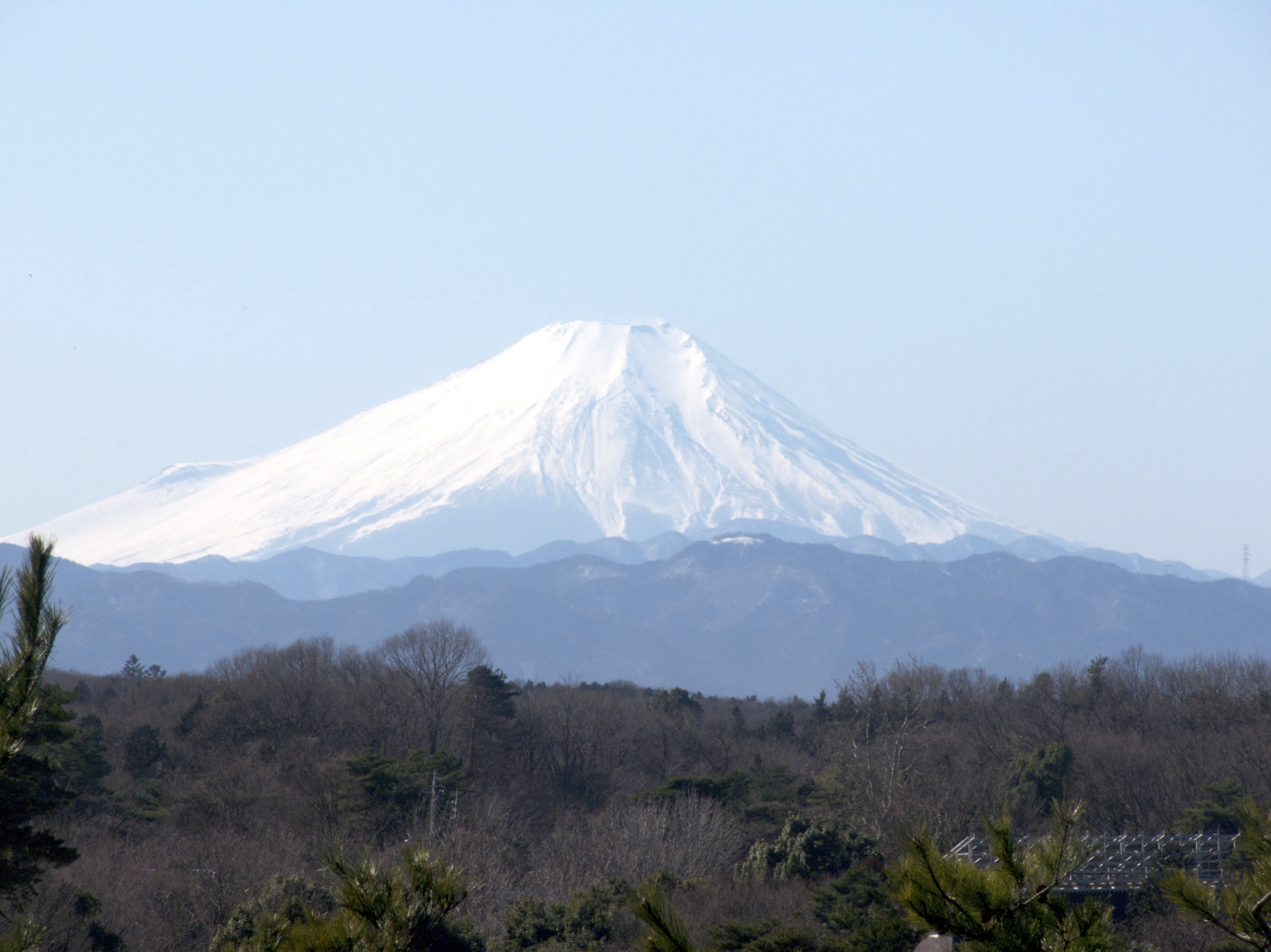
Mt Fuji From Arahata Fuji (with optical zoom)

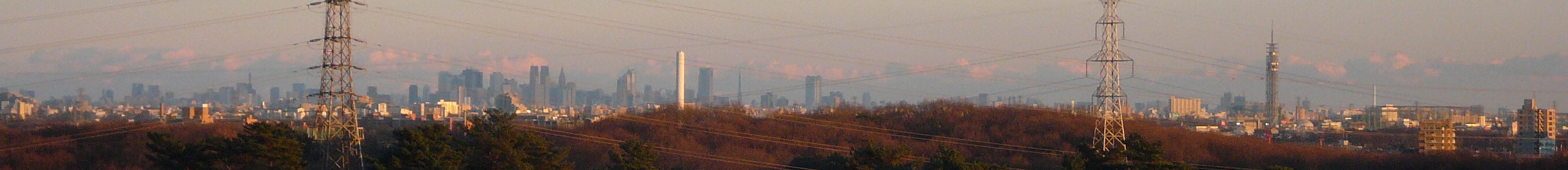
Tokyo Skyline from Arahata Fuji

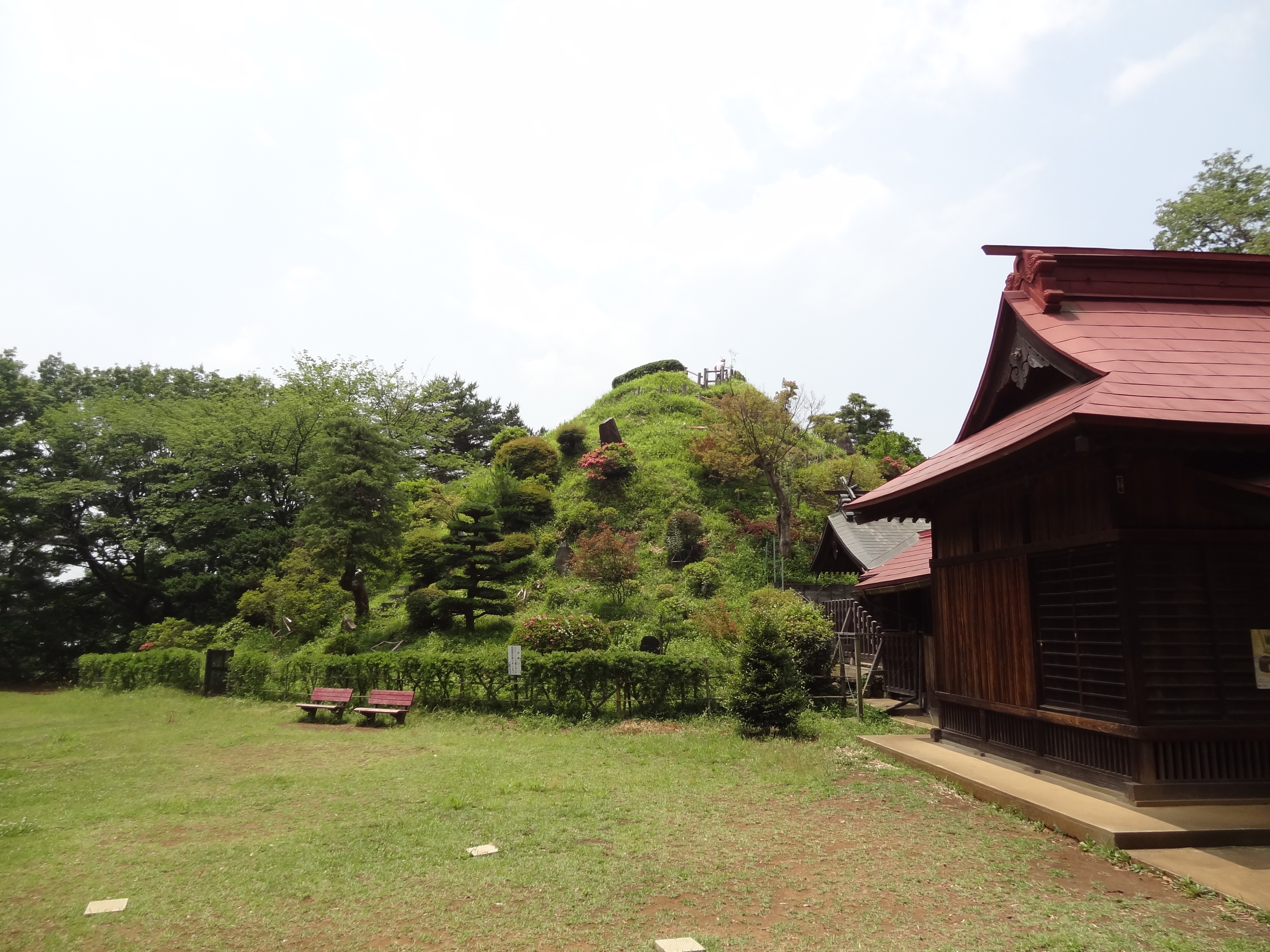
Park at base

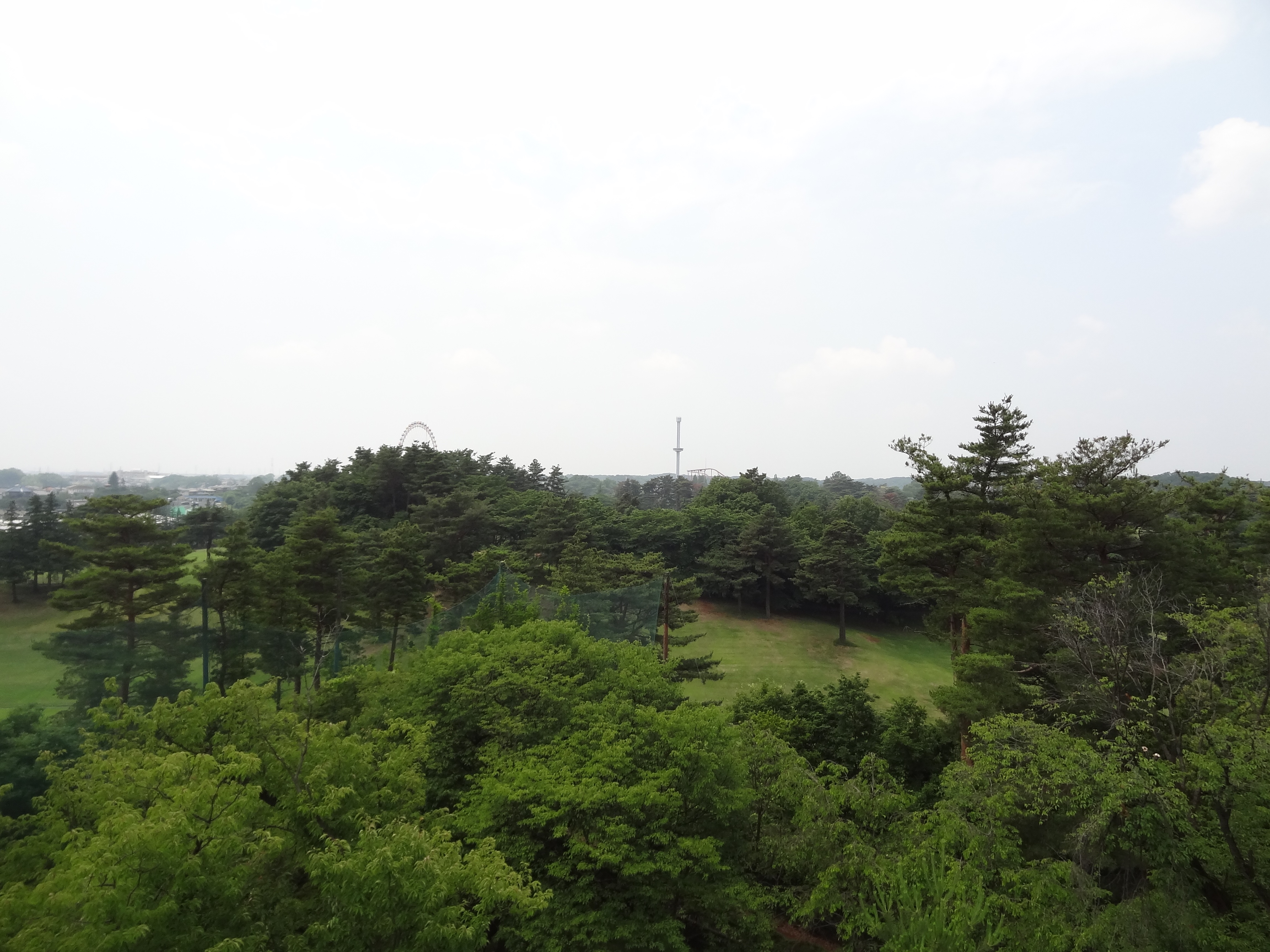
View of Seibuen Amusement Park from the summit

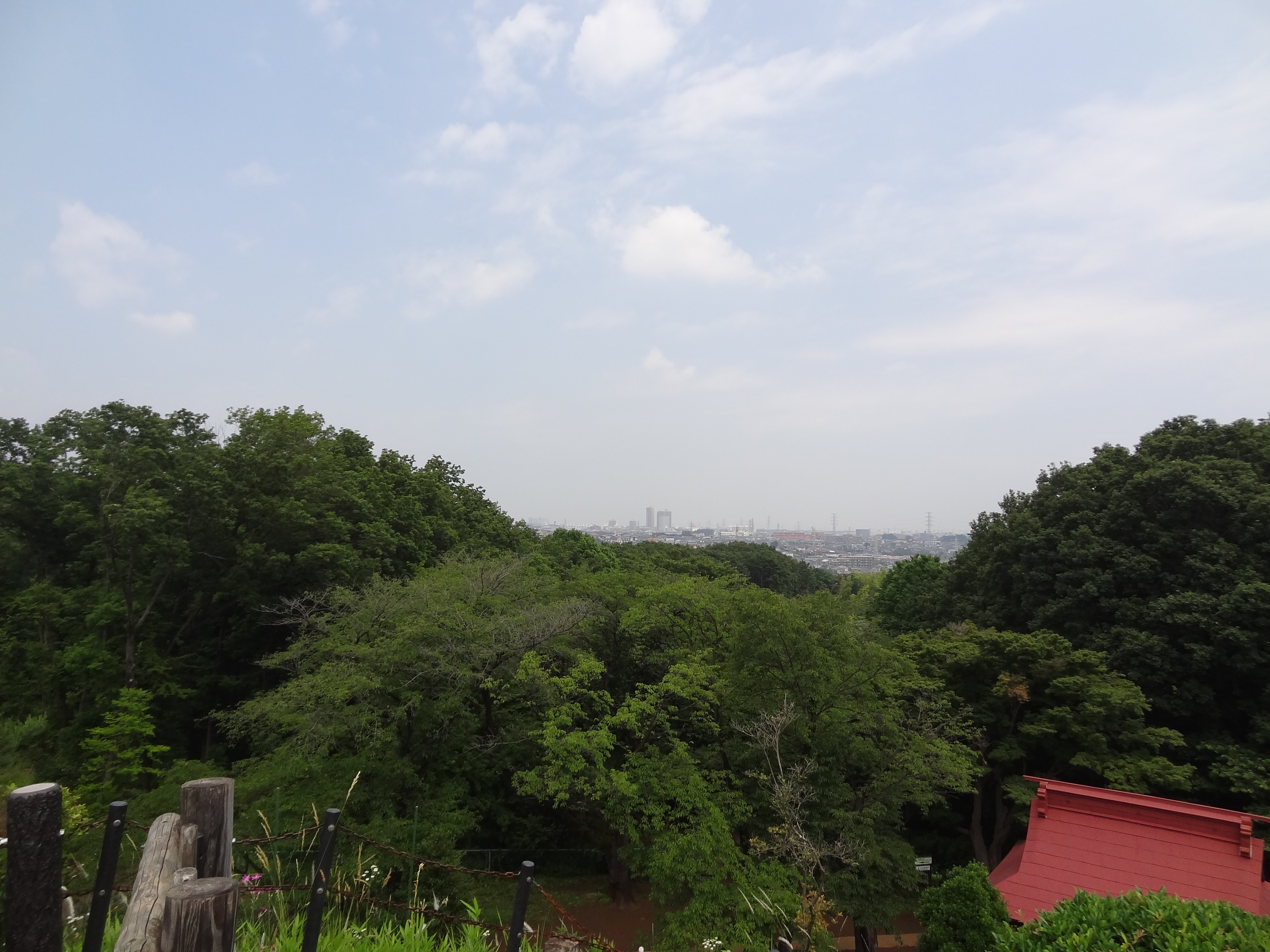
View of Downtown Tokorozawa from the summit

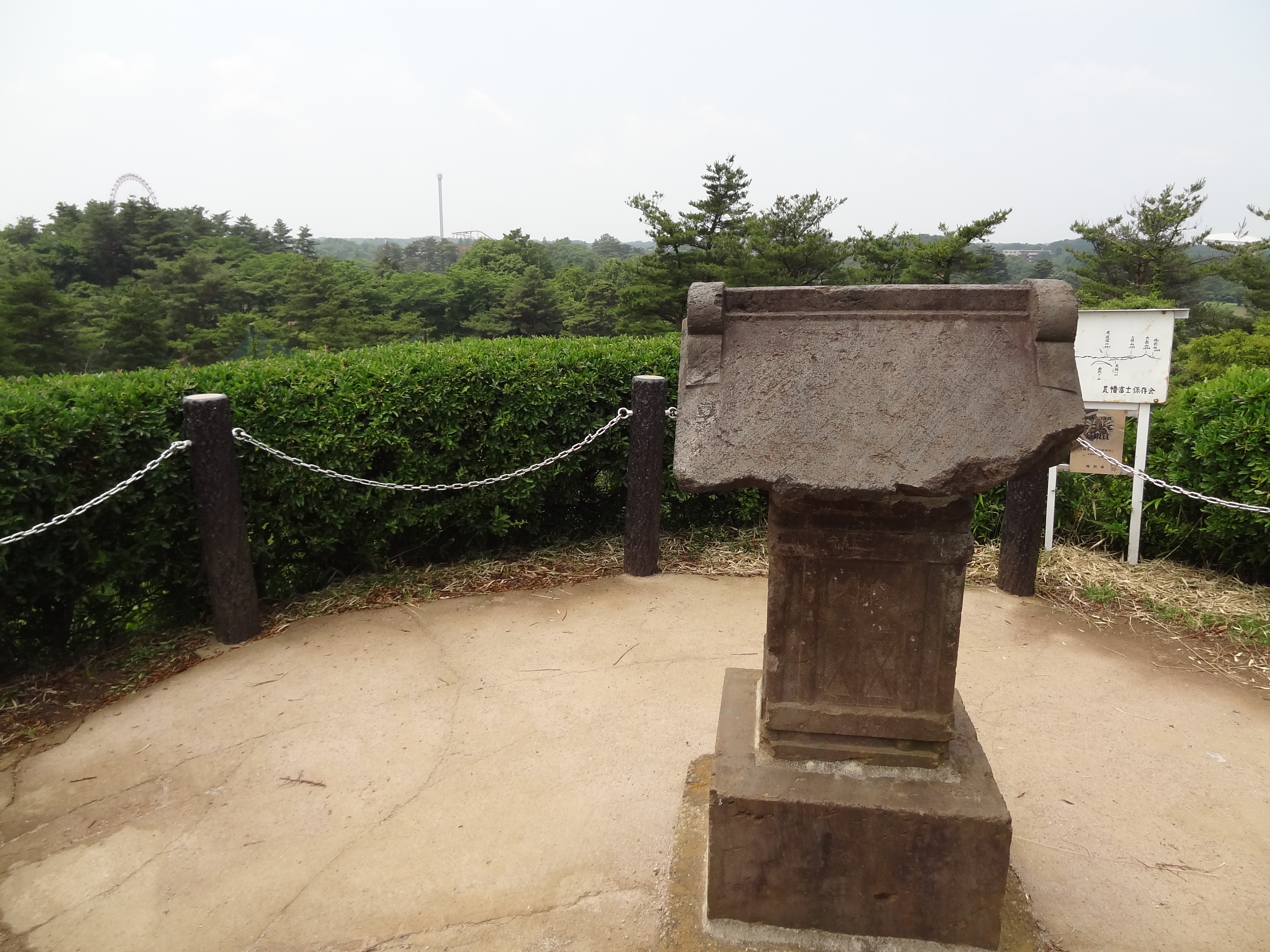
Meiji Period small shrine at the summit

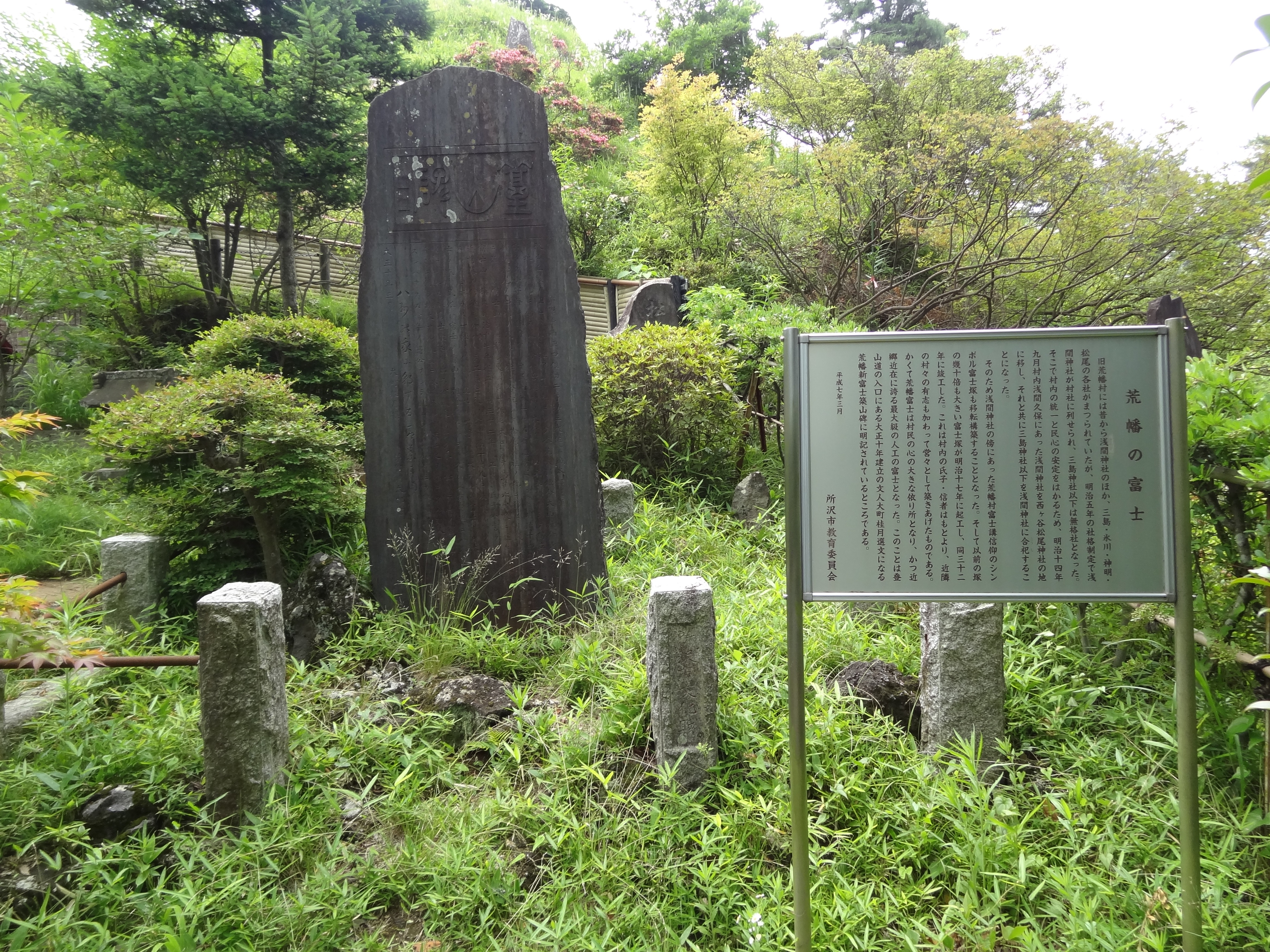
Shrine story (in Japanese)

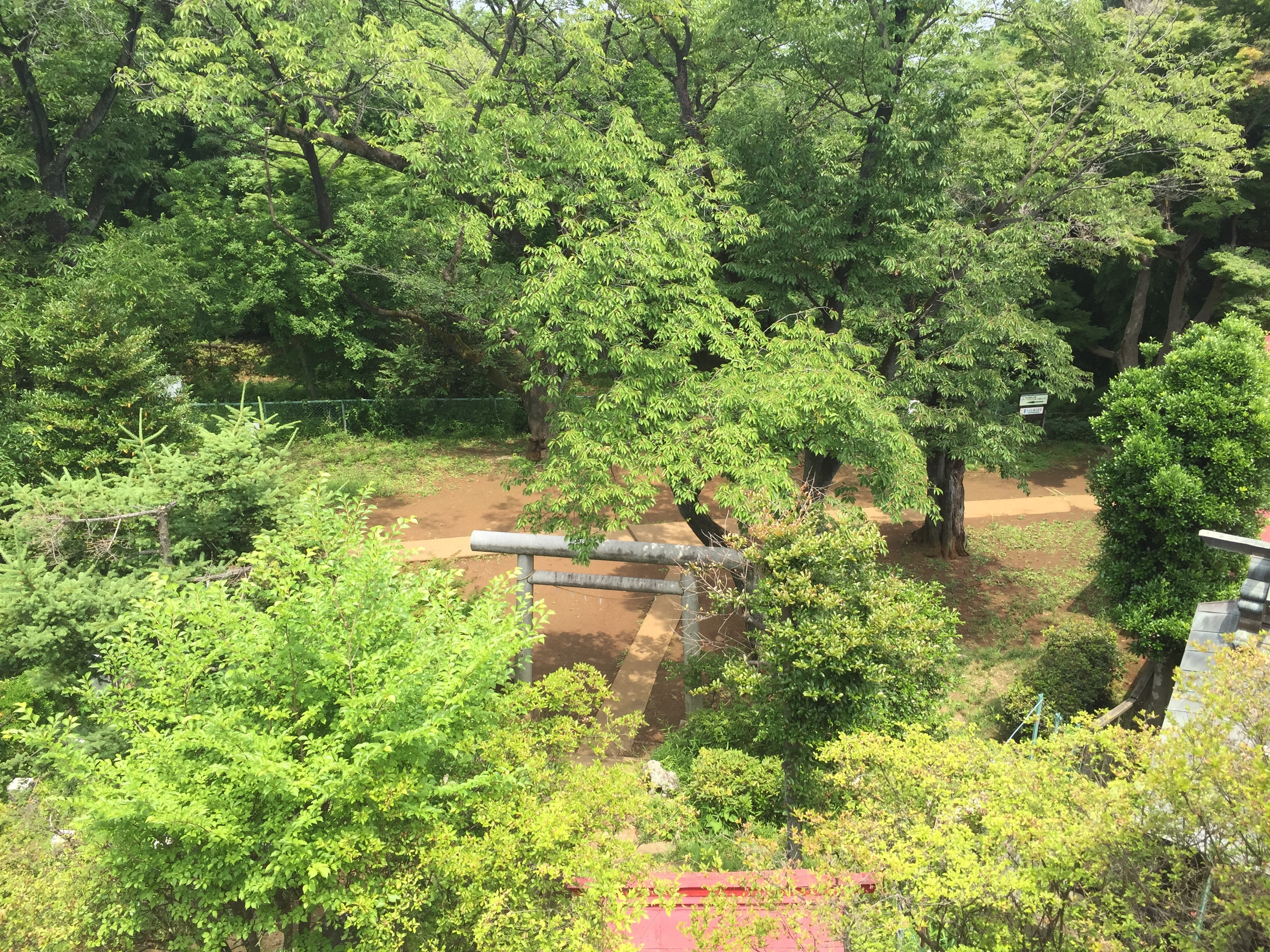
View of the Torii Gate from the summit
