= Tokorozawa =

Tokorozawa 所沢市
- Special city
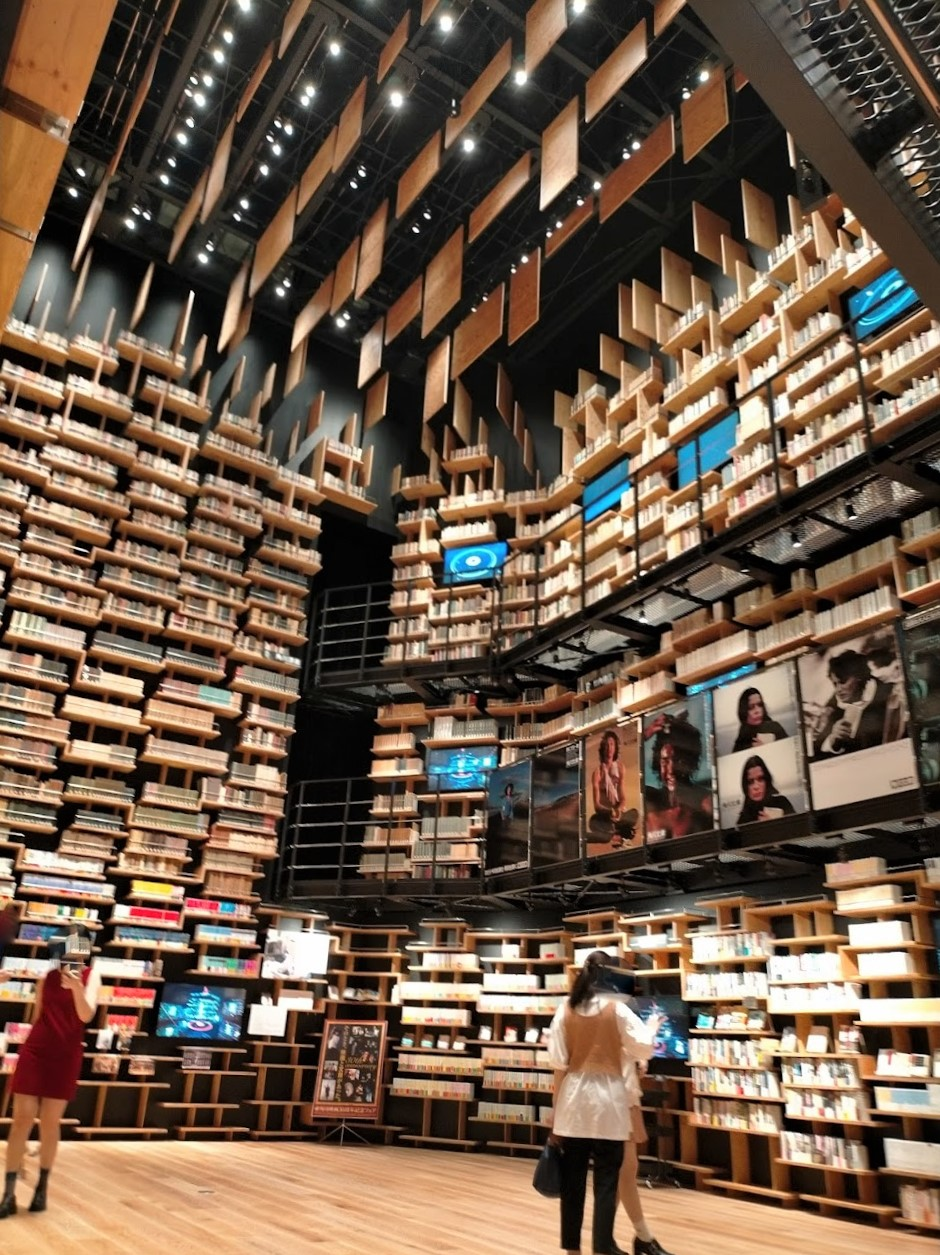
- Tokorozawa Sakura Town

- Flag Seal

- Location of Tokorozawa in Saitama Prefecture

- Location within Japan
- Coordinates: 35°47′58.6″N 139°28′7″E
- Country: Japan
- Region: Kantō
- Prefecture: Saitama

Government
  - Mayor: Masatoshi Onozuka (since October 2023)

Area
  - Total: 72.11 km^{2} (27.84 sq mi)

Population (February 2024)
  - Total: 343,298
  - Density: 4,761/km^{2} (12,330/sq mi)
- Time zone: UTC+9 (Japan Standard Time)
- Phone number: 04-2998-1111
- Address: 1-1-1 Namiki, Tokorozawa-shi, Saitama-ken 359-8501
- Climate: Cfa
- Website: Official website
- Symbols
- Bird: Eurasian skylark
- Flower: Camellia sinensis
- Tree: Ginkgo biloba

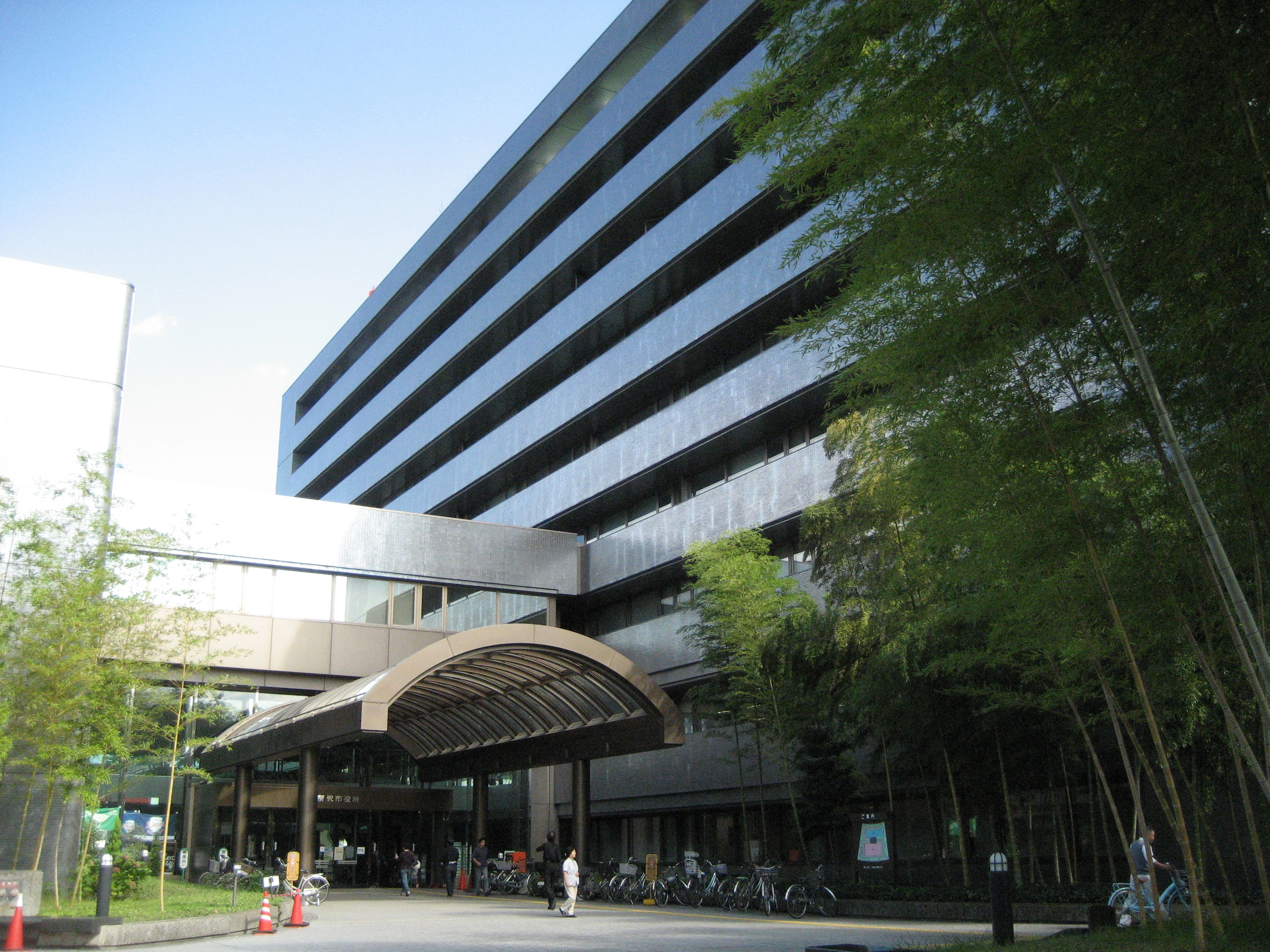
Tokorozawa City Office

Tokorozawa (所沢市, Tokorozawa-shi) is a city located in Saitama Prefecture, Japan. As of 1 February 2024, the city had an estimated population of 343,298 in 168,939 households and a population density of 4761 persons per km^{2}. The total area of the city is 72.11 square kilometres (27.84 sq mi).

== Geography ==
Tokorozawa is located in the central part of the Musashino Terrace in southern Saitama, about 30 km west of central Tokyo. Tokorozawa can be considered part of the greater Tokyo area; its proximity to the latter and lower housing costs make it a popular commuter town. The Higashikawa and Yanasegawa rivers that flow from the Sayama Hills flow to the eastern part of the city, and finally reach the Arakawa River. The Yamaguchi Reservoir (commonly known as Lake Sayama) is mostly located within city boundaries; Lake Tama also touches the south-western part of the city.

The area around Tokorozawa Station's west exit is built up as a shopping district with several department stores. Prope Street is a popular shopping arcade.

=== Surrounding municipalities ===
- Saitama Prefecture
  - Iruma
  - Kawagoe
  - Miyoshi
  - Niiza
  - Sayama
- Tokyo Metropolis
  - Higashimurayama
  - Higashiyamato
  - Kiyose
  - Mizuho
  - Musashimurayama

=== Climate ===
Tokorozawa has a humid subtropical climate (Köppen Cfa) characterized by warm summers and cool winters with light to no snowfall. The average annual temperature in Tokorozawa is 14.0 °C. The average annual rainfall is 1647 mm with September as the wettest month. The temperatures are highest on average in August, at around 25.7 °C, and lowest in January, at around 2.3 °C.

Climate data for Tokorozawa (1991−2020 normals, extremes 1977−present)
Month	Jan	Feb	Mar	Apr	May	Jun	Jul	Aug	Sep	Oct	Nov	Dec	Year
Record high °C (°F)	19.0 (66.2)	23.3 (73.9)	26.2 (79.2)	32.0 (89.6)	33.8 (92.8)	36.5 (97.7)	39.8 (103.6)	38.7 (101.7)	37.4 (99.3)	32.3 (90.1)	26.0 (78.8)	25.7 (78.3)	39.6 (103.3)
Mean daily maximum °C (°F)	9.1 (48.4)	10.0 (50.0)	13.3 (55.9)	18.7 (65.7)	23.2 (73.8)	25.8 (78.4)	29.8 (85.6)	31.3 (88.3)	27.0 (80.6)	21.4 (70.5)	16.2 (61.2)	11.5 (52.7)	19.8 (67.6)
Daily mean °C (°F)	3.7 (38.7)	4.5 (40.1)	7.8 (46.0)	13.1 (55.6)	17.8 (64.0)	21.2 (70.2)	25.0 (77.0)	26.2 (79.2)	22.4 (72.3)	16.8 (62.2)	11.1 (52.0)	6.2 (43.2)	14.7 (58.4)
Mean daily minimum °C (°F)	−0.6 (30.9)	−0.2 (31.6)	2.9 (37.2)	7.9 (46.2)	13.2 (55.8)	17.5 (63.5)	21.5 (70.7)	22.6 (72.7)	19.0 (66.2)	13.3 (55.9)	7.2 (45.0)	1.9 (35.4)	10.5 (50.9)
Record low °C (°F)	−7.8 (18.0)	−6.6 (20.1)	−5.2 (22.6)	−2.1 (28.2)	4.8 (40.6)	10.7 (51.3)	13.6 (56.5)	16.3 (61.3)	9.3 (48.7)	4.5 (40.1)	−0.8 (30.6)	−4.3 (24.3)	−7.8 (18.0)
Average precipitation mm (inches)	50.9 (2.00)	47.0 (1.85)	98.3 (3.87)	110.1 (4.33)	125.8 (4.95)	166.7 (6.56)	172.4 (6.79)	190.4 (7.50)	233.2 (9.18)	212.6 (8.37)	75.0 (2.95)	47.3 (1.86)	1,529.5 (60.22)
Average precipitation days (≥ 1.0 mm)	4.0	5.2	9.0	9.0	10.2	12.4	12.2	10.0	12.0	10.4	7.0	4.9	106.3
Mean monthly sunshine hours	202.8	184.2	179.1	183.8	182.1	120.8	148.2	177.3	132.4	134.4	161.7	183.9	1,985.8
Source: JMA

== Demographics ==
Per Japanese census data, the population of Tokorozawa has recently plateaued after several decades of strong growth.

Historical population
Year	Pop.	±%
1920	33,723	—
1930	39,103	+16.0%
1940	41,874	+7.1%
1950	52,188	+24.6%
1960	65,903	+26.3%
1970	136,611	+107.3%
1980	236,476	+73.1%
1990	303,040	+28.1%
2000	330,100	+8.9%
2010	341,924	+3.6%
2020	342,464	+0.2%

== History ==
Archaeological research has shown that the vicinity of Tokorozawa was settled from about 20,000 years ago. Tokorozawa Shinmei Shrine has a traditional establishment of 110 AD. Hatogamine Hachiman Shrine is believed to date from 921 AD. During the Kamakura period, the Kamakura Kaidō ran through the area and the area was host to a series of battles fought in May 1333 that were part of the Genko War that ultimately ended the Kamakura Shogunate. These include the 1333 Battle of Kotesashi and the Battle of Kumegawa. Kotesashi was again the site of another battle nineteen years later. During the Edo period (1603–1867) the area's major industry was sericulture. It was also an important trading center, being located at the intersection of roads connecting Edo with the towns of Hachioji, Chichibu, Kawagoe and Fuchu.

The town of Tokorozawa was created within Iruma District, Saitama with the establishment of the modern municipalities system on April 1, 1889.

Tokorozawa became the site of Japan's first air base and air service academy in 1911. The base was used through the end of World War II and fell under the control of the United States Armed Forces after the war. The US returned most of its property in Tokorozawa to Japan in 1971, but retains a communications facility in the city which is operated by the 374th Airlift Wing of the Fifth Air Force, based at Yokota Air Base to the southwest. The facility houses antennas for communications with USAF aircraft in the region. Much of the land returned to Japan has been converted into the public Tokorozawa Aviation Memorial Park.

Tokorozawa was elevated to city status on November 3, 1950. In 1955, Tokorozawa annexed the neighboring villages of Yanase and Mikajima, and assumed its present boundaries. The development of large scale public housing and railroad development led to a rapid population increase in the 1960s. Tokorozawa was the site of the Clay pigeon shooting event in the 1964 Tokyo Olympics.

Tokorozawa was designated as a special city with increased local autonomy in 2002. It currently meets the conditions to be designated as a core city but has yet to receive this designation.

== Government ==
Tokorozawa has a mayor-council form of government with a directly elected mayor and a unicameral city council of 34 members. Tokorozawa contributes four members to the Saitama Prefectural Assembly. In terms of national politics, the city is part of Saitama 8th district of the lower house of the Diet of Japan.

== Economy ==
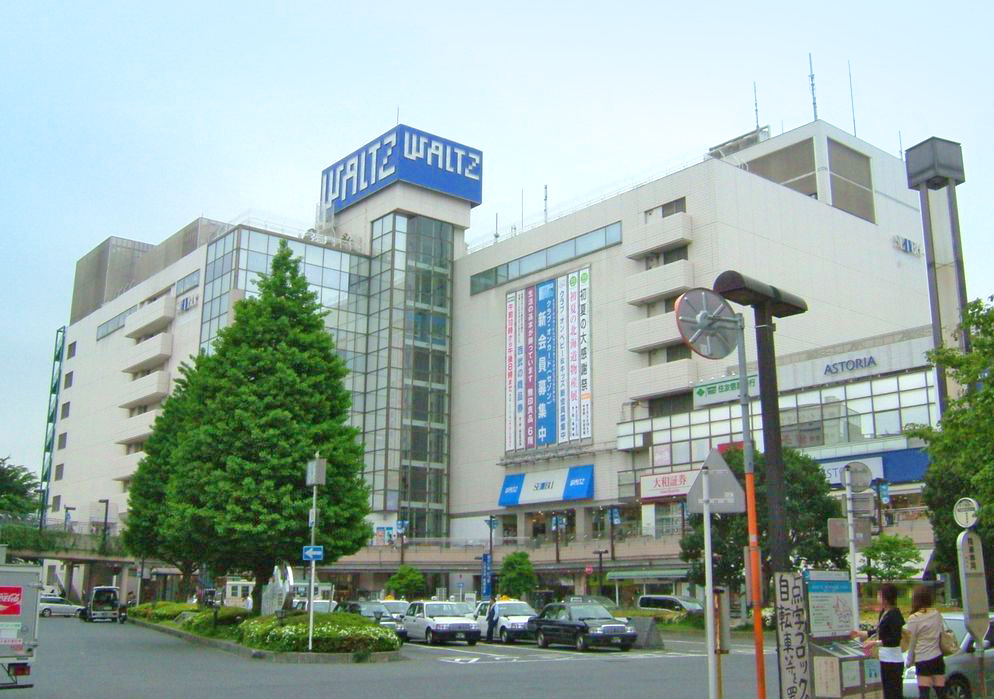
Seibu department store in central Tokorozawa

=== Public sector ===
Tokorozawa houses the Tokyo Area Control Center, which controls airspace in the Kantō, Jōetsu, Tōhoku, Chūbu, and Hokuriku regions and a portion of the Kansai region.

=== Private sector ===
Tokorozawa is the headquarters of Seibu Holdings, the parent company of Seibu Railway and Tokorozawa Station forms a hub in the Seibu Railway network which serves western Tokyo and southern Saitama. Tokorozawa is at the intersection of Seibu's two main lines, which respectively run to Ikebukuro Station and Seibu Shinjuku Station in central Tokyo. Several Seibu group companies, including its railway and bus divisions, are headquartered in the vicinity of Tokorozawa Station. Seibu owns an amusement park, baseball stadium (Seibu Prince Dome) and velodrome (Seibu-en Velodrome) in the "Seibu-en" district near Lake Tama in the southwestern corner of the city.

Citizen Holdings operates a watch factory in Tokorozawa.

== Education ==
- Akikusa Gakuen Junior College
- College of Art, Nihon University – Tokorozawa campus
- Waseda University – Tokorozawa campus
- Tokorozawa has 32 public elementary schools and 15 public junior high schools operated by the city government, and six public high schools operated by the Saitama Prefectural Board of Education. In addition the prefecture also operates two special education schools for the handicapped.

Prefectural high schools:

- Saitama Prefectural High School of the Arts
- Saitama Prefectural Tokorozawa Chuo High School
- Saitama Prefectural Tokorozawa Commercial High School
- Saitama Prefectural Tokorozawa High School
- Saitama Prefectural Tokorozawa Kita High School
- Saitama Prefectural Tokorozawa Nishi High School

== Transportation ==
=== Railway ===
Map of Seibu Railway

JR East – Musashino Line

- Higashi-Tokorozawa

Seibu Railway - Seibu Ikebukuro Line

- Tokorozawa - Nishi-Tokorozawa - Kotesashi - Sayamagaoka

Seibu Railway - Seibu Shinjuku Line

- Tokorozawa - Kōkū-kōen - Shin-Tokorozawa

Seibu Railway - Seibu Sayama Line

- Nishi-Tokorozawa - Shimo-Yamaguchi - Seibukyūjō-mae

Seibu Railway - Seibu Yamaguchi Line

- Seibukyūjō-mae - Seibuen-yūenchi

=== Highway ===
- Kan-etsu Expressway
- National Route 463

== Sister cities ==
Tokorozawa is twinned with:

- Decatur, Illinois, United States from May 6, 1966
- Changzhou, Jiangsu, China from April 20, 1992
- Anyang, Gyeonggi, Republic of Korea from April 17, 1998

== Local attractions ==
=== Professional sports teams ===
- Saitama Seibu Lions (baseball, Belluna Dome)
- Saitama Broncos (basketball, Tokorozawa Municipal Stadium)

=== General points of interest ===
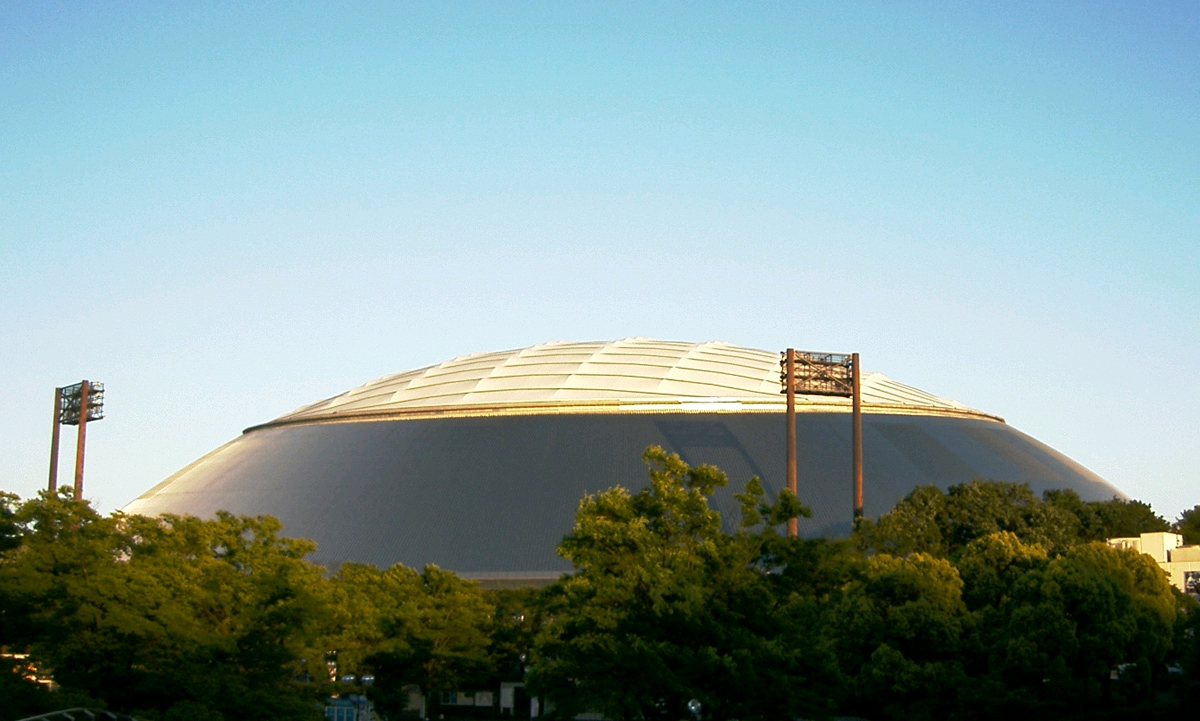
Belluna Dome

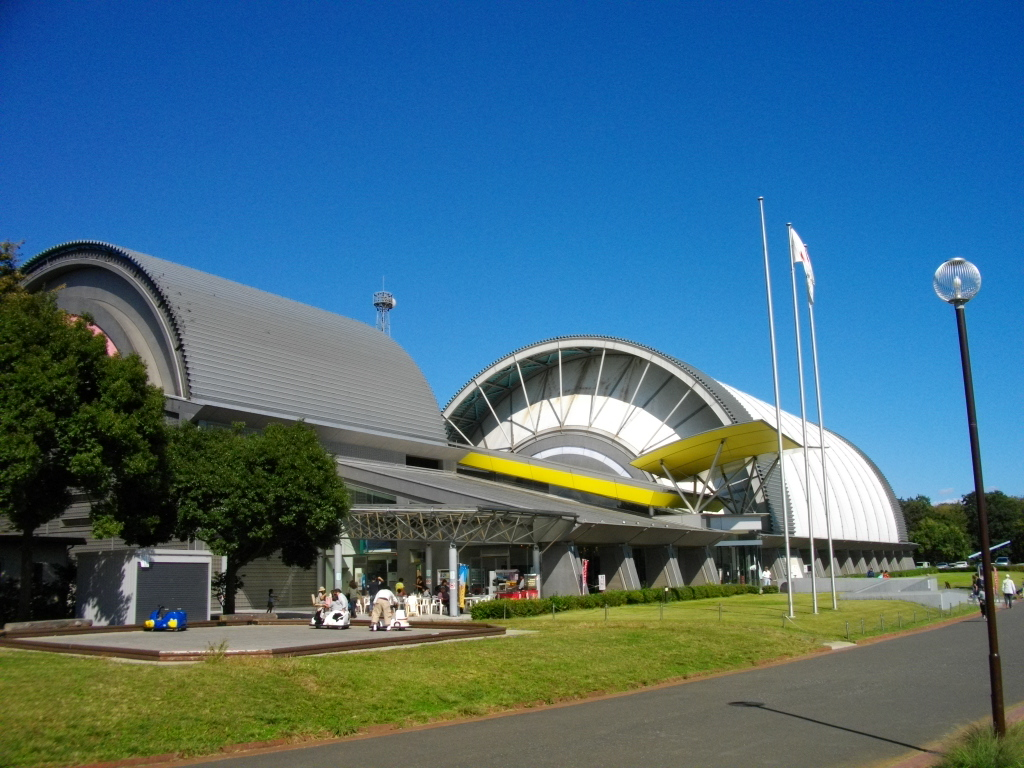
Tokorozawa Aviation Museum

- Arahata Fuji Shrine: Shinto Shrine that is a scale reproduction of Mount Fuji offering views of the latter
- Belluna Dome: home of the Seibu Lions
- Futagoyama stable: stable of professional sumo wrestlers
- Hachikokuyama: nature park famous for being the inspiration of Totoro
- Kadokawa Culture Museum: New multiple museum building designed by Kengo Kuma at Tokorozawa Sakura Town. It features the permanent outdoor art installation "Resonating Life in the Acorn Forest" by TeamLab as well as a double-height 8-meter-tall (26 ft) library housing fifty thousand plus volumes which can morph into a ‘bookshelf theater’ via projection mapping.
- Kurosuke no ie: office of Totoro fund
- Sayama Ski Slope: indoor ski and snowboard resort
- Seibu-en: amusement park
- Tokorozawa Aviation Museum: the location of Japan's first airfield.
- Tokorozawa Civic Cultural Centre Muse: public auditorium and concert hall

=== Historical points of interest ===
- Battle of Kotesashi: site of an important battle during the Genko War
- Hatogamine Hachiman Shrine: an ancient Shinto shrine including a 13th-century main shrine building
- Konjoin: "Yamaguchi Kanon" Since 810-824
- Sayama Fudōson: important temple of Tendai
- Shinko-ji: A Buddhist temple that was established during the Kamakura period
- Tokorozawa Shinmei Shrine: believed to have been founded in the second century A.D.
- Waterfall Castle: a Sengoku Period castle ruin

=== Events ===
The Tokorozawa Matsuri is a festival held each year in October and features traditional Japanese parade floats ( mikoshi ), taiko drums, and samba dancers.

A two-day festival featuring music, cultural and sports exhibitions, community group activities and food booths takes place in late October in Kokukoen Park on the grounds of the former airfield. A similar 1-day festival, the Shimin Bunka Fair, takes place in early April in the park.

The city and local business community decorates the west side of Tokorozawa station with holiday lights from early December through mid March, and separate lighting ceremonies featuring local musicians, politicians, and sports figures are conducted for various portions of the lighted areas.

== Notable people from Tokorozawa ==
- Hokutōfuji Daiki, sumo wrestler (Real Name: Daiki Nakamura, Nihongo: 中村 大輝, Nakamura Daiki)
- Masaaki Goto, professional footballer
- Yoshiharu Habu, professional shogi player
- Bokuzen Hidari (1894–1971), actor born in Kotesashi Village (which was absorbed into Tokorozawa)
- Toshiaki Kasuga, comedian
- Junya Matsunaga, professional wrestler
- Naoto, Japanese idol, dancer, rapper and member of the groups Exile and Sandaime J Soul Brothers (Real Name: Naoto Kataoka, Nihongo: 片岡直人, Kataoka Naoto)
- Chisato Okai, Japanese idol and former member of the idol group C-ute
- Yoshiji Soeno, Japanese karateka and former kickboxer (welterweight)
- George Tokoro (Real Name: Takayuki Haga, Nihongo: 芳賀 隆之, Haga Takayuki), comedian, TV personality, singer-songwriter and essayist

== Tokorozawa in popular culture ==
- Tokorozawa inspired the setting for the animated film My Neighbor Totoro (Tonari no Totoro).
- In the light novel series Sword Art Online, much of the story is based in Tokorozawa.
- Scenes in the Japanese film Shall We Dance? were set in Tokorozawa. The Seibu Ikebukuro Line's Sayamagaoka Station features in the film.
- Scenes in the Japanese horror film Ju-on were filmed in Tokorozawa. The area around Tokorozawa Station is identifiable.
- Tokorozawa has been known as the place where Tokusatsu, especially Super Sentai, is often filmed. Tokorozawa Aviation Memorial Park is the notable place often used for filming process.
