= Battle of Kumegawa =

- Part of the Kamakura period
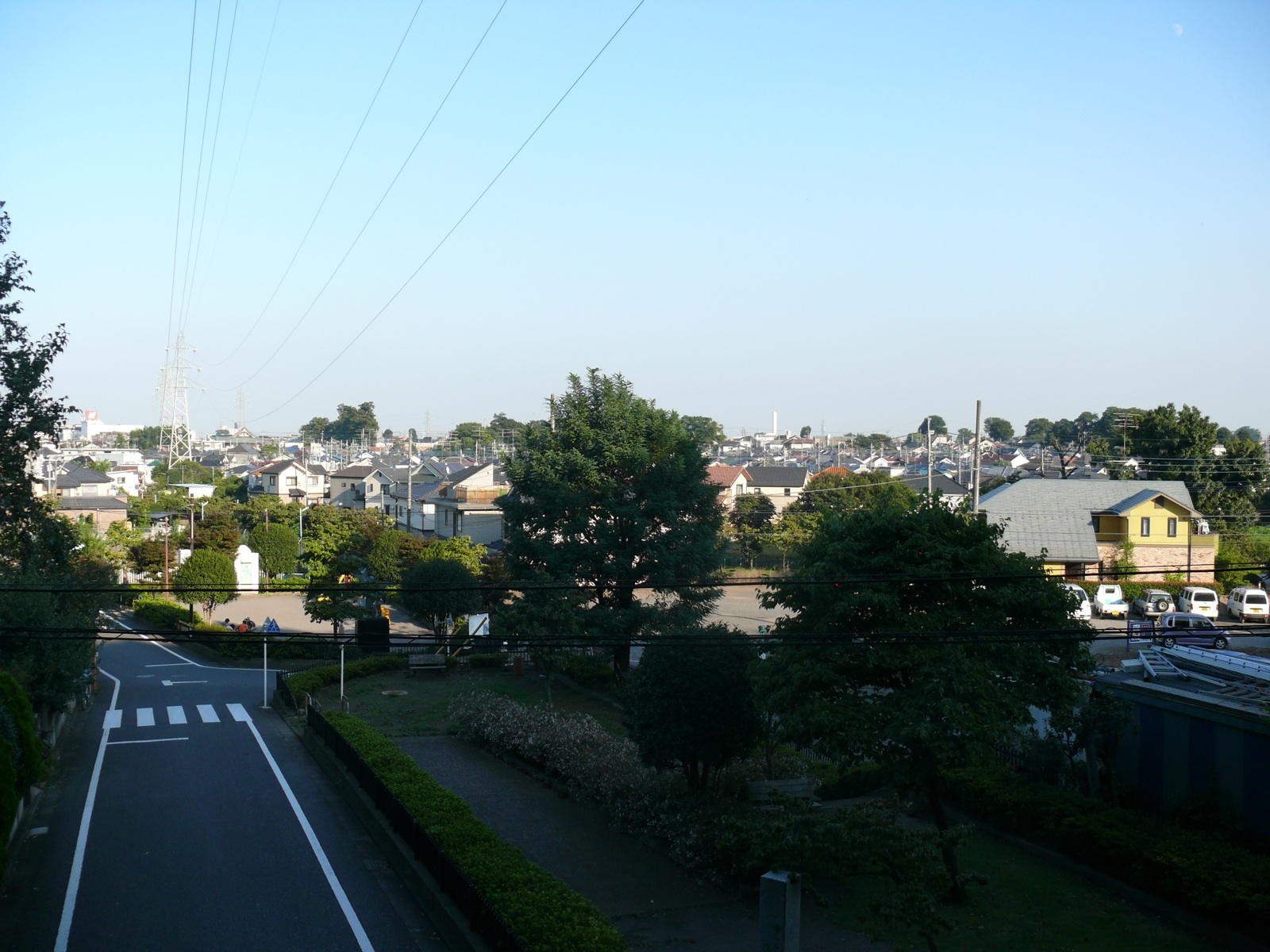
- Site of Kumegawa Battlefield (2008) which is now a suburb of Tokyo. Nitta Yoshisada had this vantage point during the battle some 675 years prior.
Date	May 12, 1333
Location	Kumegawa, present-day Higashimurayama, Tokyo Japan 35°46′23.15″N 139°28′03″E
Result	Imperial victory

Belligerents
Forces loyal to the Kamakura Shogunate	Forces loyal to the Emperor Go-Daigo

Commanders and leaders
Sakurada Sadakuni	Nitta Yoshisada

The Battle of Kumegawa (久米川の戦い, Kumegawa no tatakai) was part of the decisive Kōzuke-Musashi Campaign during the Genkō War in Japan that ultimately ended the Kamakura Shogunate. Fought in present-day Higashimurayama, Tokyo at the foot of the Hachikokuyama ridge on May 12, 1333, it pitted the anti-shogunate imperial forces led by Nitta Yoshisada against the forces of the pro-Shogunate Hōjō Regency led by Sakurada Sadakuni. The battle was an immediate follow on from the previous day's nearby Battle of Kotesashi.

== The Setting ==
The region from the east side of the Sayama Hills through the Yanagase River was the field of several battles during Japan's Sengoku period. The battlefield was regarded as strategically important because it was on the old road linking the provincial capital of Musashi Province with the capital of Kōzuke Province and it was also the halfway point between the Iruma and Tama rivers.

== The battle ==
At dawn on May 12, the Imperial forces advanced upon the Shogunate forces' position at the Kume River (久米川, Kumegawa) via the Kamakura Kaidō highway. Since the previous day's battle at Kotesashi was indecisive, both sides had expected the battle to continue. The chosen battlefield was a plain crisscrossed by small rivers and bordered by low-lying ridges. The geography gave the mounted warriors room to maneuver with their commanders overlooking the battle from the surrounding ridges such as where Nitta Yoshisada raised his banner at Hachikokuyama.

The Taiheiki chronicles the events. The Shogunate forces formed a large mass with intention of encompassing the Imperial forces. The Imperial forces formed a wedge to protect its center. With neither side gaining immediate advantage, the battle continued until losses forced the Shōgun's forces to retreat. Losses were reported as relatively light for the Imperial forces but heavy for the Shōgun's.

== Result ==
The result was a victory for the Imperial forces; having grown weary from two days of heavy fighting, they rested at the battlefield. The Shogunate forces retreated south to Bubaigawara to await reinforcements.

== Aftermath ==
The two armies fought again three days later at Bubaigawara and Sekido. In less than one week, Nitta led the Imperial forces 50 kilometers south and finally eliminated the Shōgun's forces during the Siege of Kamakura.

The area was later a battlefield in 1335 during the Nakasendai Rebellion and the War of Uesugi Zenshu in 1416-1417.
