= Kamakura Kaidō =

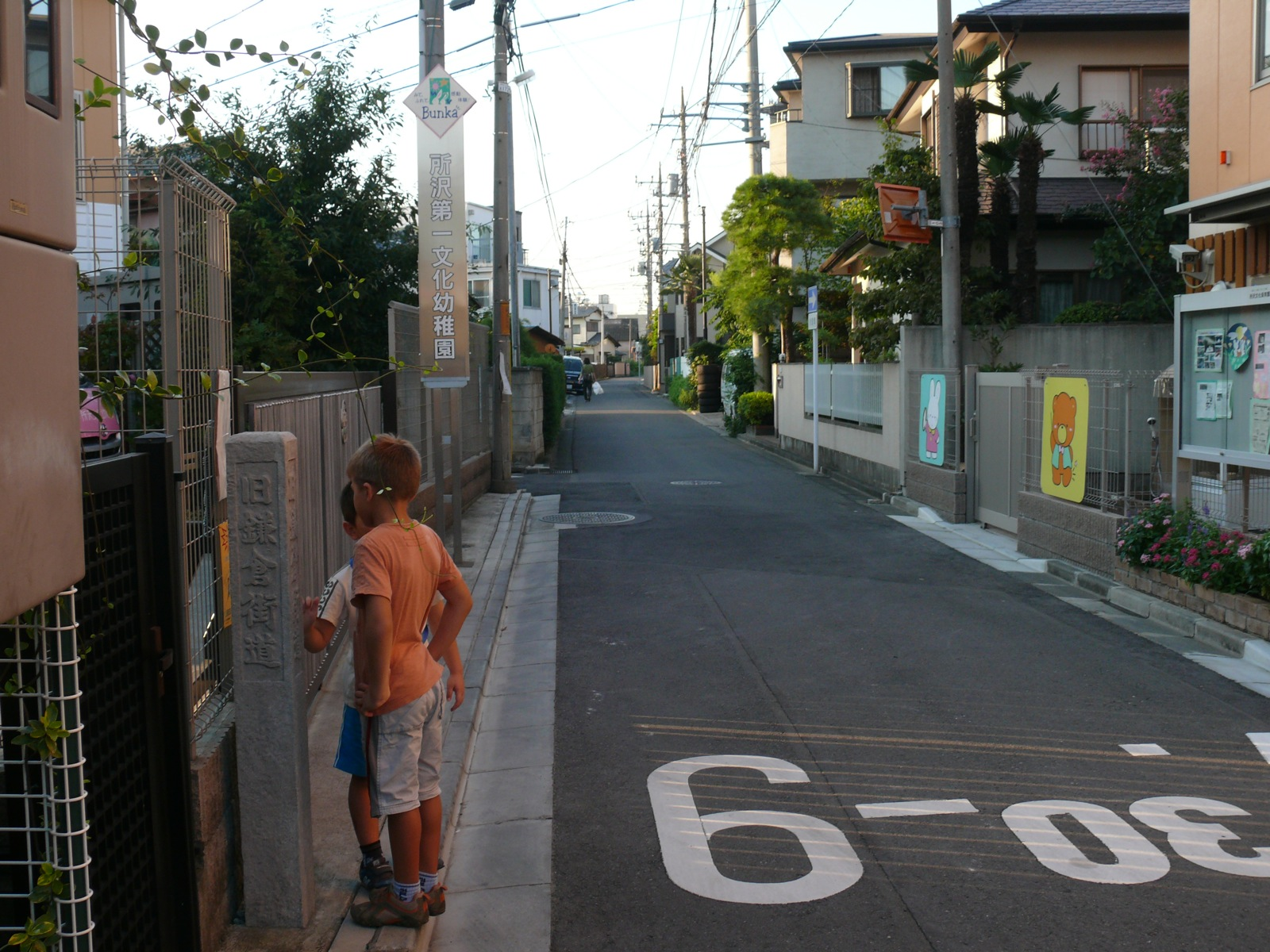
The Old Kamakura Kaidō as it passes through Tokorozawa. Modern markers such as the one on the left are often found where the path of the old highway is known.

Kamakura Kaidō (鎌倉街道, Kamakura Highway or Highways) is the generic name of a great number of roads built during the Kamakura period which, from all directions, converged on the military capital of Kamakura, Kanagawa Prefecture, Japan. The term itself however was created probably during the Edo period to mean simply any old road going to Kamakura; it is used for example in the Fudokikō. The famous Tōkaidō highway which connects Kyoto to Kamakura can therefore also be considered a Kamakura Kaidō. Texts like the Taiheiki and the Azuma Kagami see things from a Kamakura-centric perspective and therefore use for the same roads individual names deriving from their destination, for example Kyōto Ōkan or the generic term Kamakura Ōkan (鎌倉往還, Kamakura Highway). Today, modern paved roads that approximately follow one of the routes of an Old Kamakura Kaidō are named either Kamakura Kaidō, as Tokyo Prefecture Machida Route 18, or Old Kamakura Kaidō (旧鎌倉街道, Kyū Kamakura Kaidō).

== The three main routes ==
The three main roads in the Kantō region were called Kami no Michi (上の道) ("Upper Route"), Naka no Michi (中の道) ("Middle Route"), and Shimo no Michi (下の道) ("Lower Route"). Their course is well known because it's described in several medieval books. They ended at the Shinto gate (torii) at the entrance of Tsurugaoka Hachiman-gū in Kamakura. Like the other routes, these roads were built to allow quick army movements from and to Kamakura and were of great importance during the many internal wars of the period. The Kami no Michi, in particular, was used by Nitta Yoshisada for his 1333 attack on Kamakura, and all the battlefields of that campaign (for example the battles of Kotesashi (小手指) and Kumegawa (久米川), both in today's Tokorozawa, Saitama Prefecture, or Bubaigawara (分倍河原) in today's Fuchū) are therefore along its course.

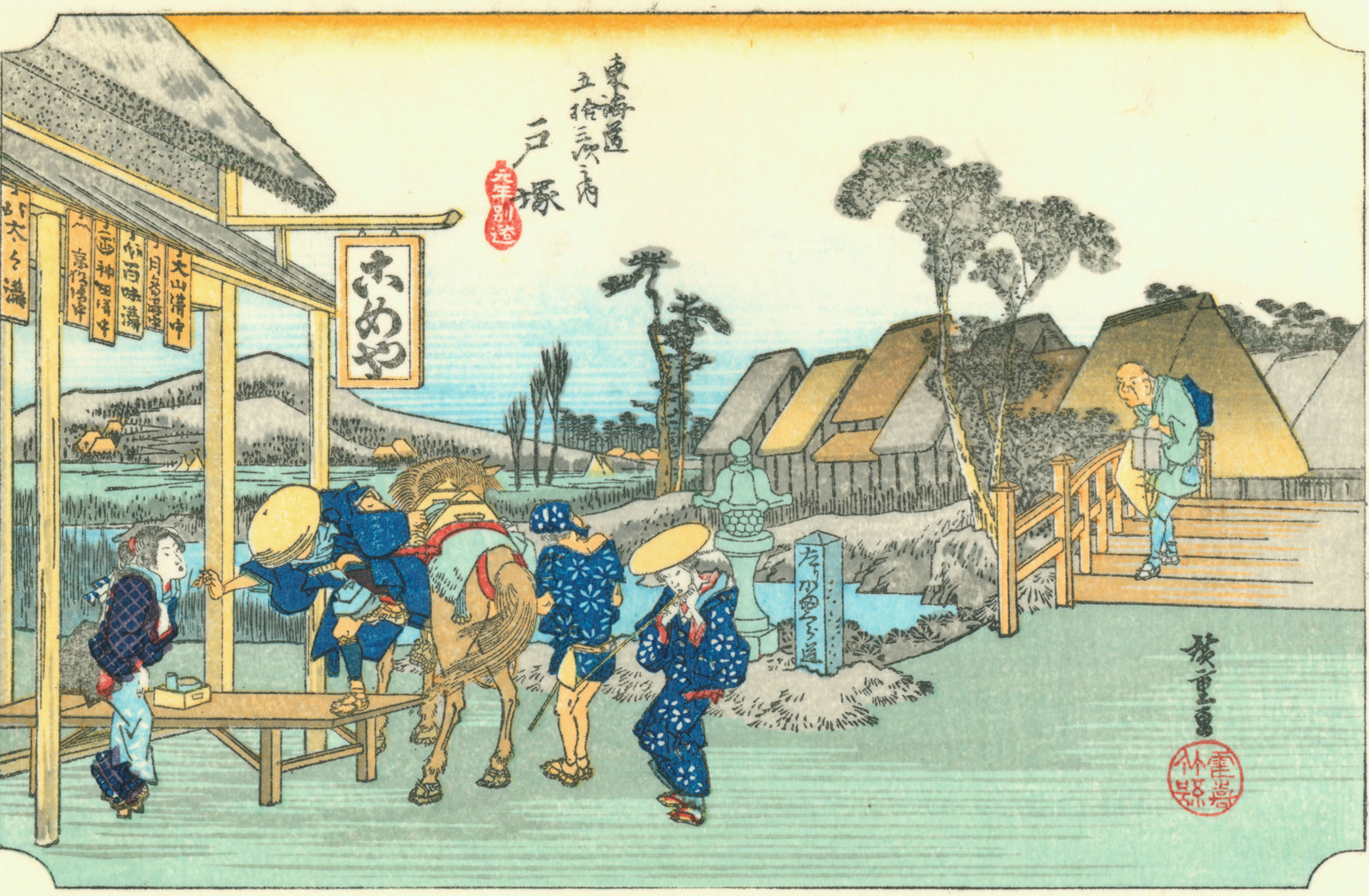
Hiroshige, "The fifty-three stages of the Tōkaidō" - Totsuka. The road signal before the bridge says that the road to the left is the "Kamakura Michi" (Kamakura Road)

The Kamakura Kaidō/Ōkan network remained important during the Muromachi period (1336–1573) because Kamakura continued to be essential to control the Kantō region, however, after the last Kantō kubō Ashikaga Shigeuji was driven out of Kamakura and established himself in Shimōsa Province, the Later Hōjō clan supremacy made Kantō's political and economic center move to Odawara. The final blow to the network was given by the Tokugawa, who in the 17th century made Edo their capital. With Kamakura's importance waning, the network fell in disrepair and in places disappeared.

Even though they are described in several old texts like the Azuma Kagami, the Taiheiki, the Gukanshō and the Baishōron (梅松論) the three roads' exact courses aren't known with certainty, and their description can therefore vary considerably with the source. The following are considered the most likely.

=== The Kami no Michi ===
From Tsurugaoka Hachiman-gū's gate, the Kami no Michi passed through the Kewaizaka Pass, then Susaki, Watauchi (today's Fujisawa), Karasawa, Iida (within today's Yokohama), then Seya, Tsuruma (today's Machida), Tamagawa, Bubai, Fuchū, Kokubunji, Sayama, and Ogawa, then, at the Usui Pass, divided in three, forming the Shinanoji (信濃路) (that went towards today's Nagano Prefecture), Jōshūji (上州路) (that went towards today's Gunma Prefecture) and the Musashiji (武蔵路), that went towards Musashi Province, today's Tokyo Prefecture. For unknown reasons, this route appears to be what the Azuma Kagami calls Shimo no Michi.

=== The Naka no Michi ===
The Naka no Michi departed from Tsurugaoka Hachiman-gū with a left turn and passed through the Kobukurozaka Pass, Yamanouchi, Ofuna, Kasama (within today's Yokohama), Nagaya, Futamatagawa, and Nakayama, finally joining the Kami no Michi there. In Kamakura this particular road is still known as Kamakura Kaidō.

=== The Shimo no Michi ===
The Shimo no Michi was a branch of the Naka no Michi that departed before Tsurumi (within today's Yokohama), then crossed Maruko, Shibuya, Hatogaya, Yono, Iwatsuki, Iwatsuki, Koga, and Yūki, then reaching Utsunomiya. In Maruko (near today's Kawasaki), the Shimo no Michi divided into the Bōsōji (房総路) and the Hitachiji (常陸) the first going to Kisarazu, the second going to Ishioka in Northern Ibaraki Prefecture.

== Gallery ==
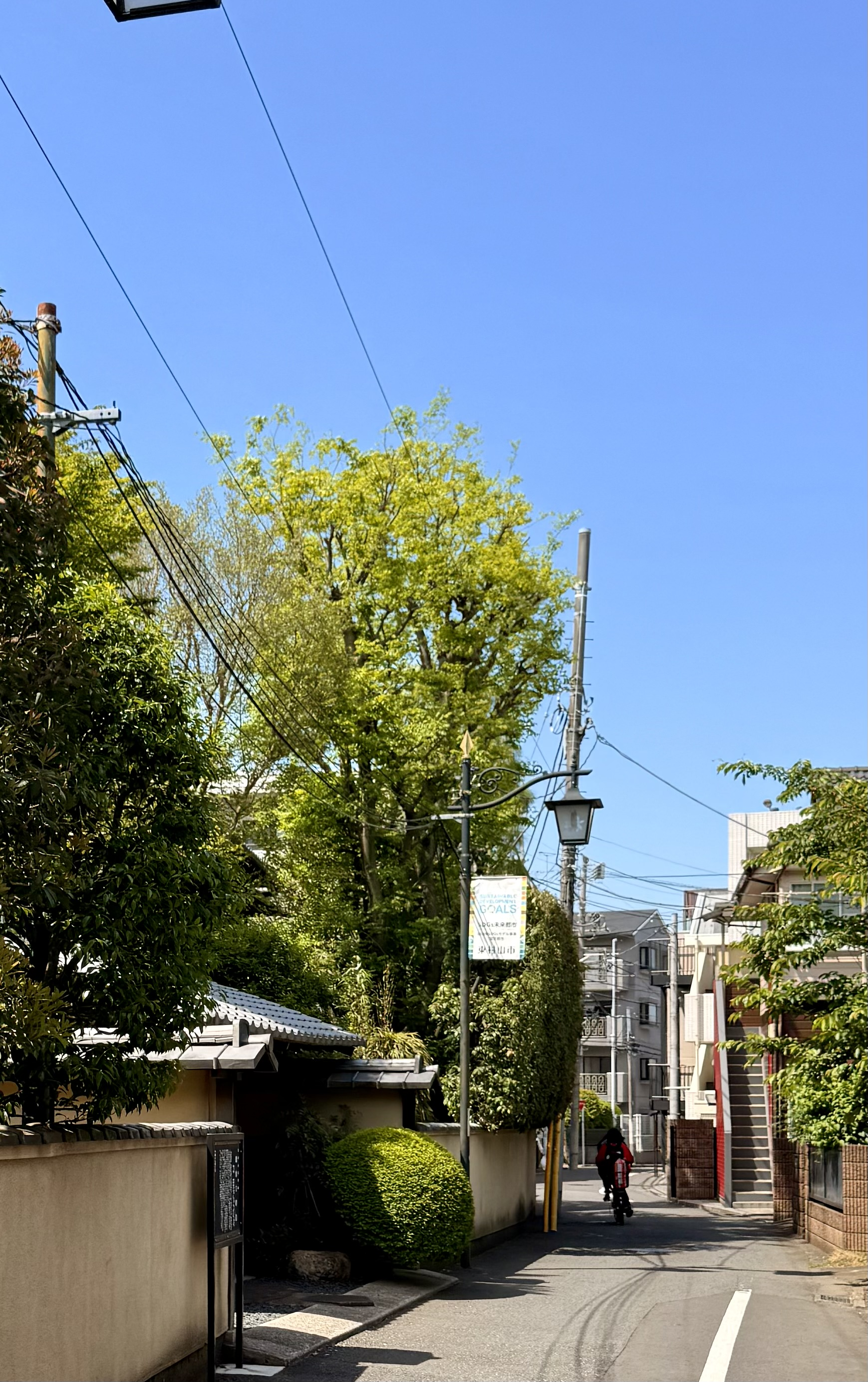
Kamakura Kaido Highway in Hagashimurayama, Tokyo (Northward)

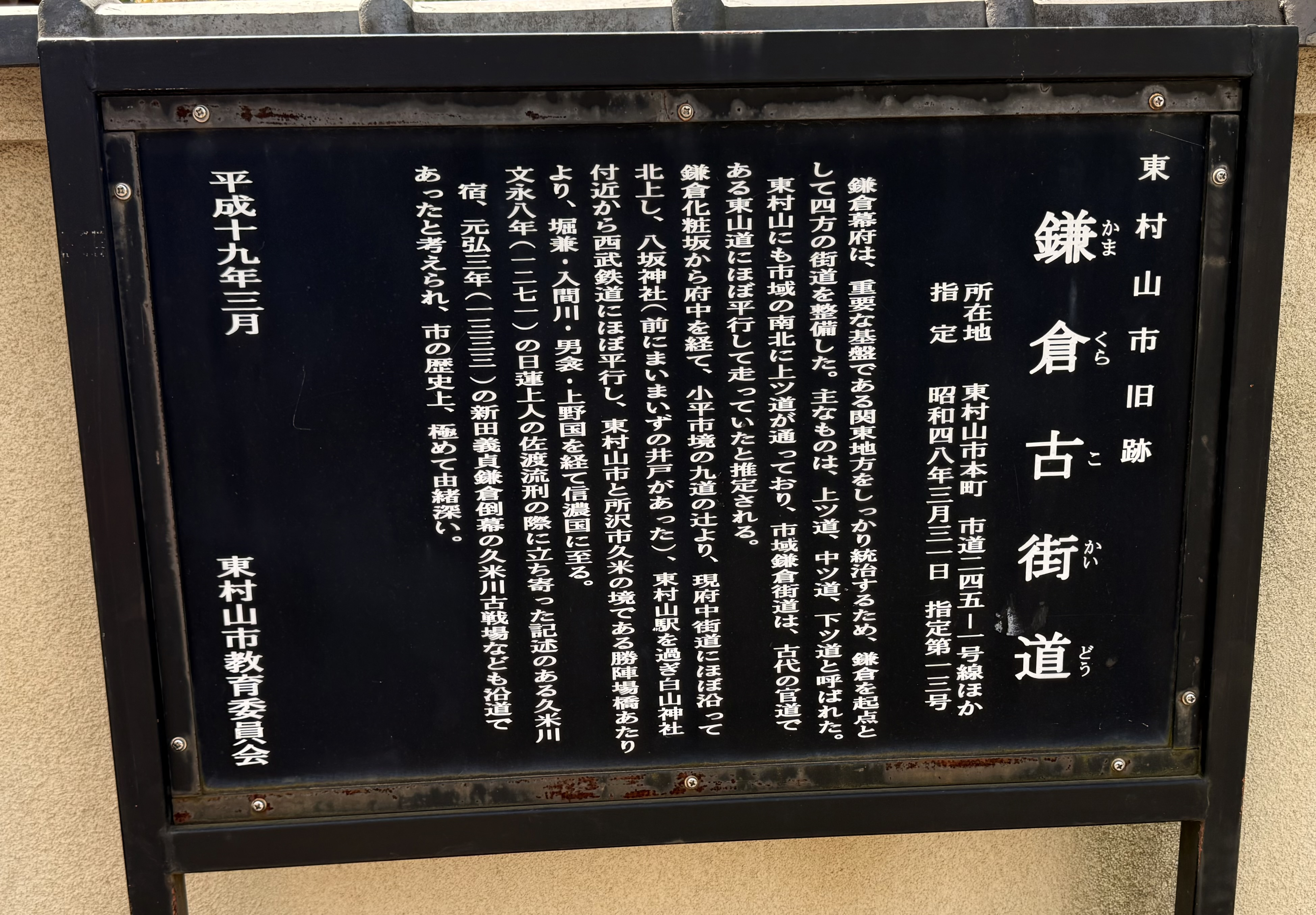
Kamakura Kaido Highway in Hagashimurayama, Tokyo (descriptive sign)

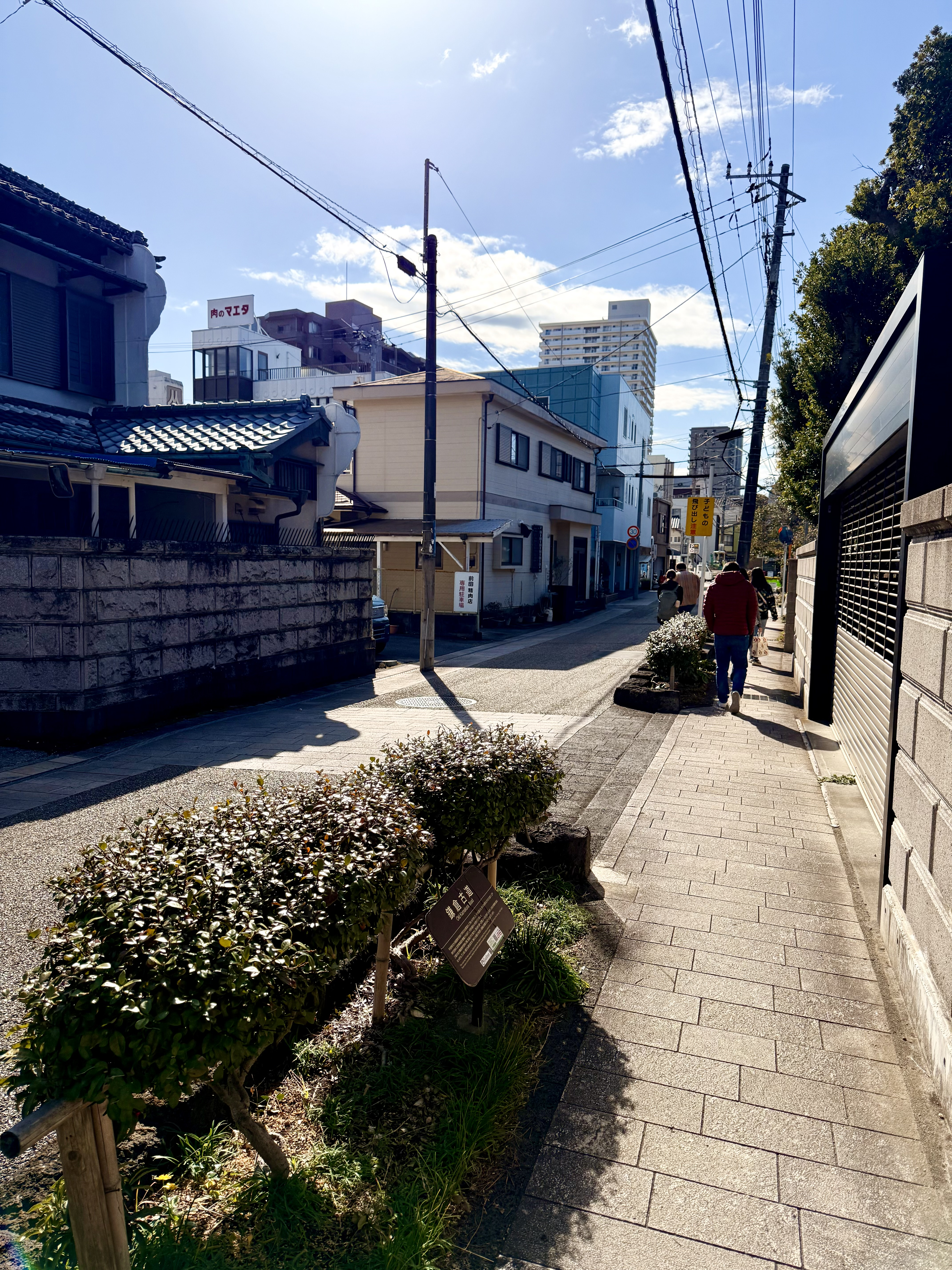
Kamakura Kaido Highway, Mishima, Japan

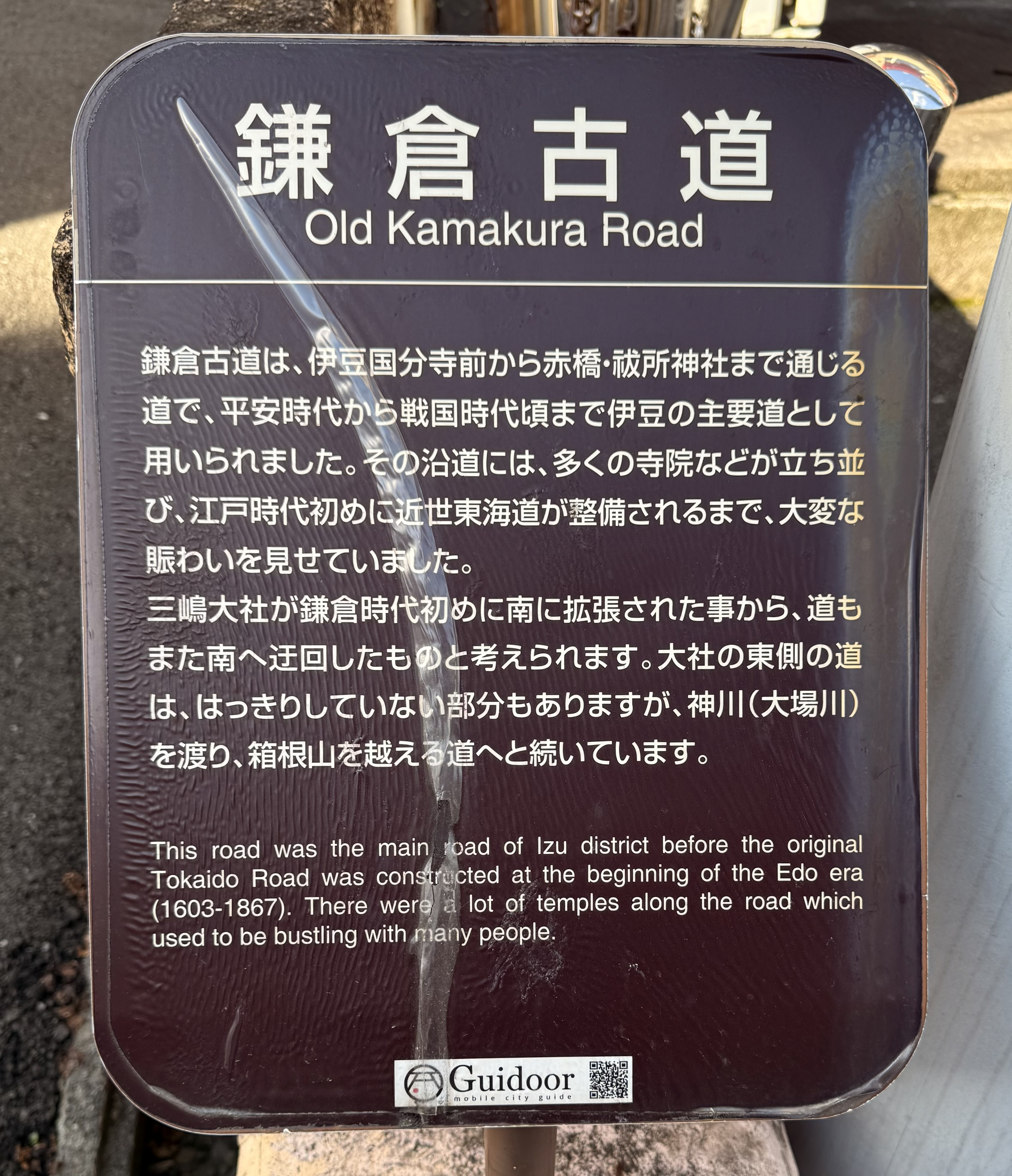
Kamakura Kaido Highway, Mishima, Japan (Descriptive Sign)

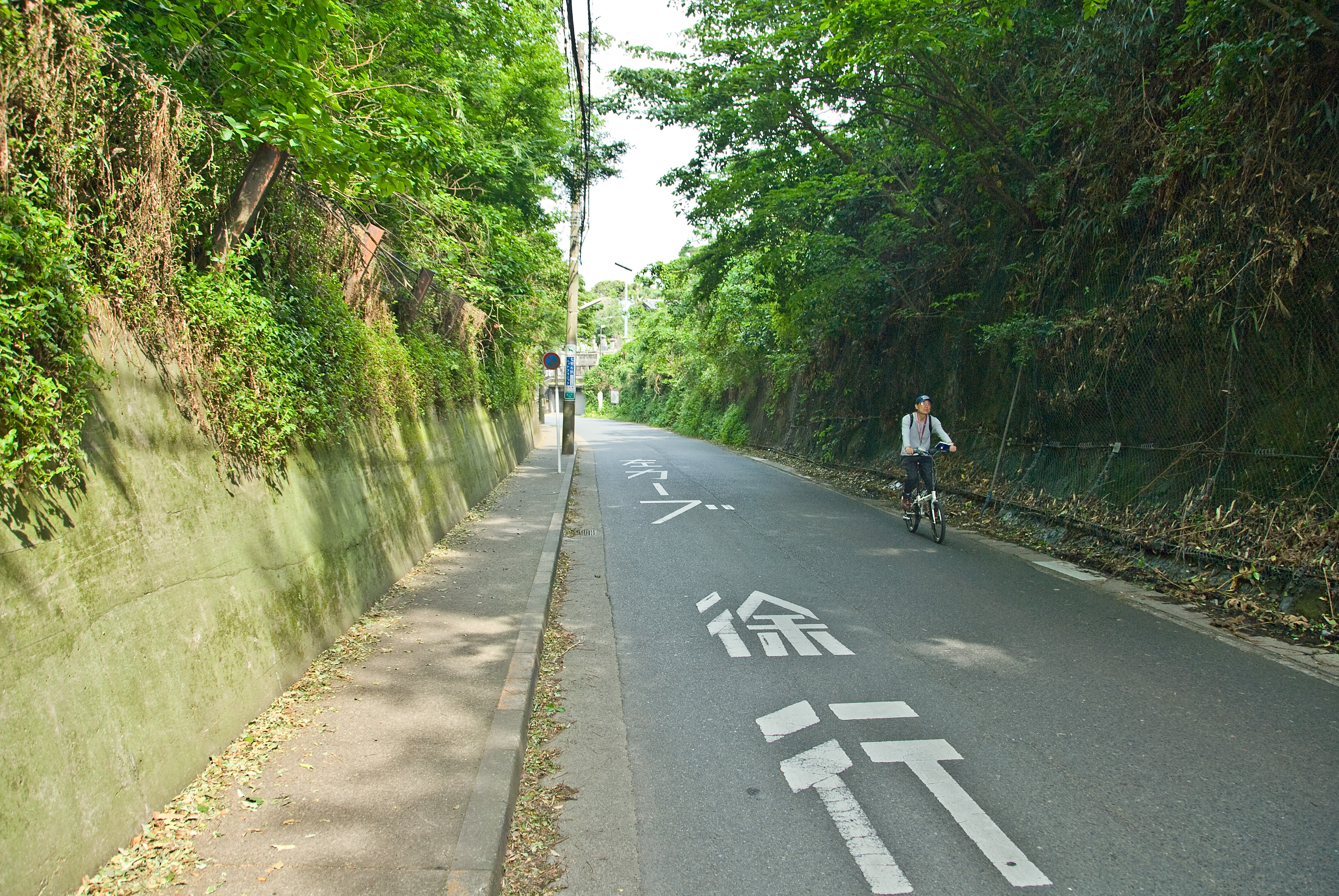
The Gokuraku Pass Entrance into Kamakura where Nitta Yoshisada's army was repelled by the Hojo defences in 1333.

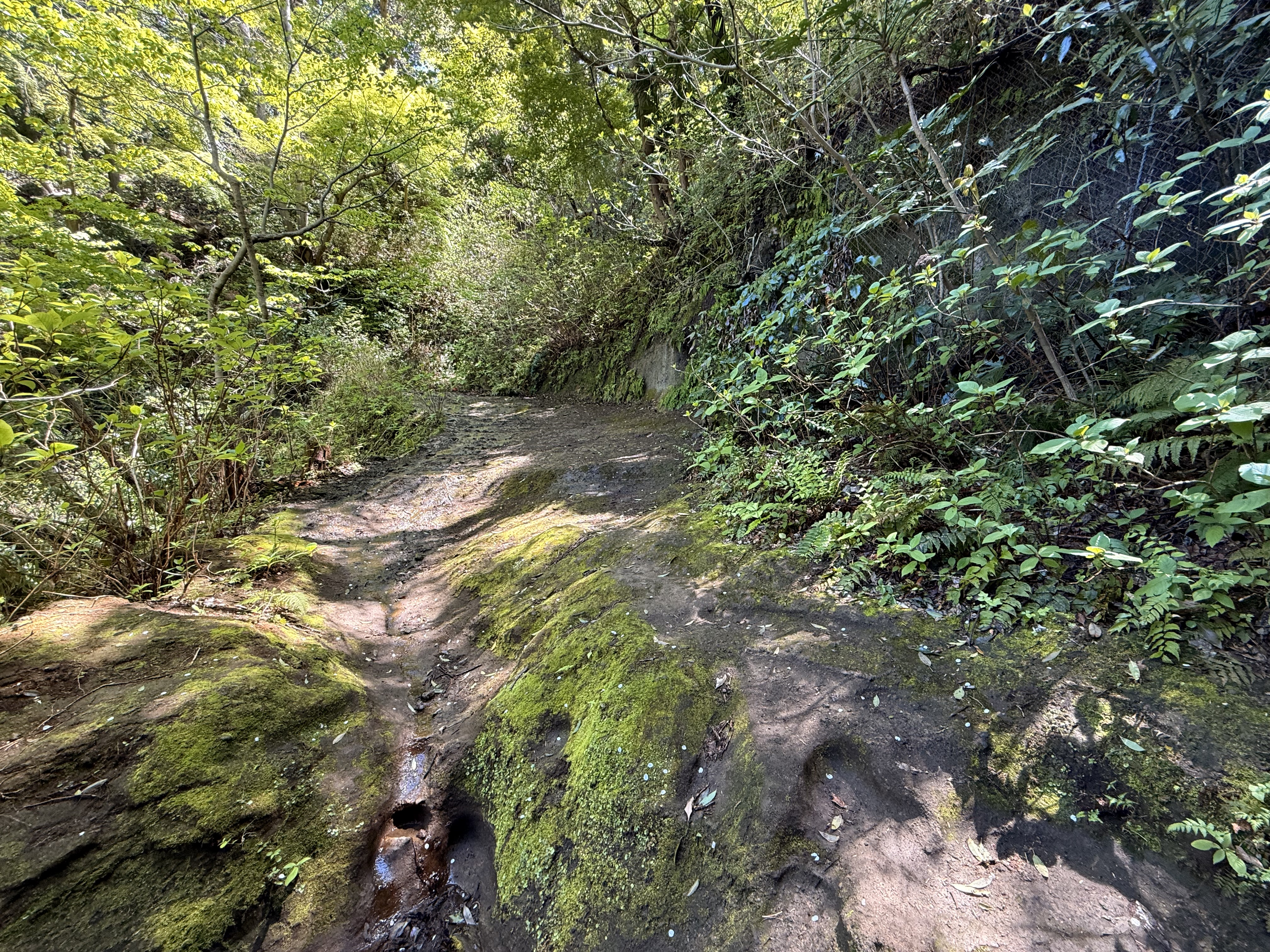
Kewaizaka Pass Entrance into Kamakura. Major northwestern route from Musashi Province (modern Tokyo/Saitama). It was used by Nitta Yoshisada to attempt to breach the Kamakura defenses during his army's 1333 attack but repelled by Hōjō forces. Today, it is preserved as a hiking path through forested hills.
