= Musashi Kokubun-ji =

Buddhist temple in Tokyo, Japan

- 武蔵国分寺
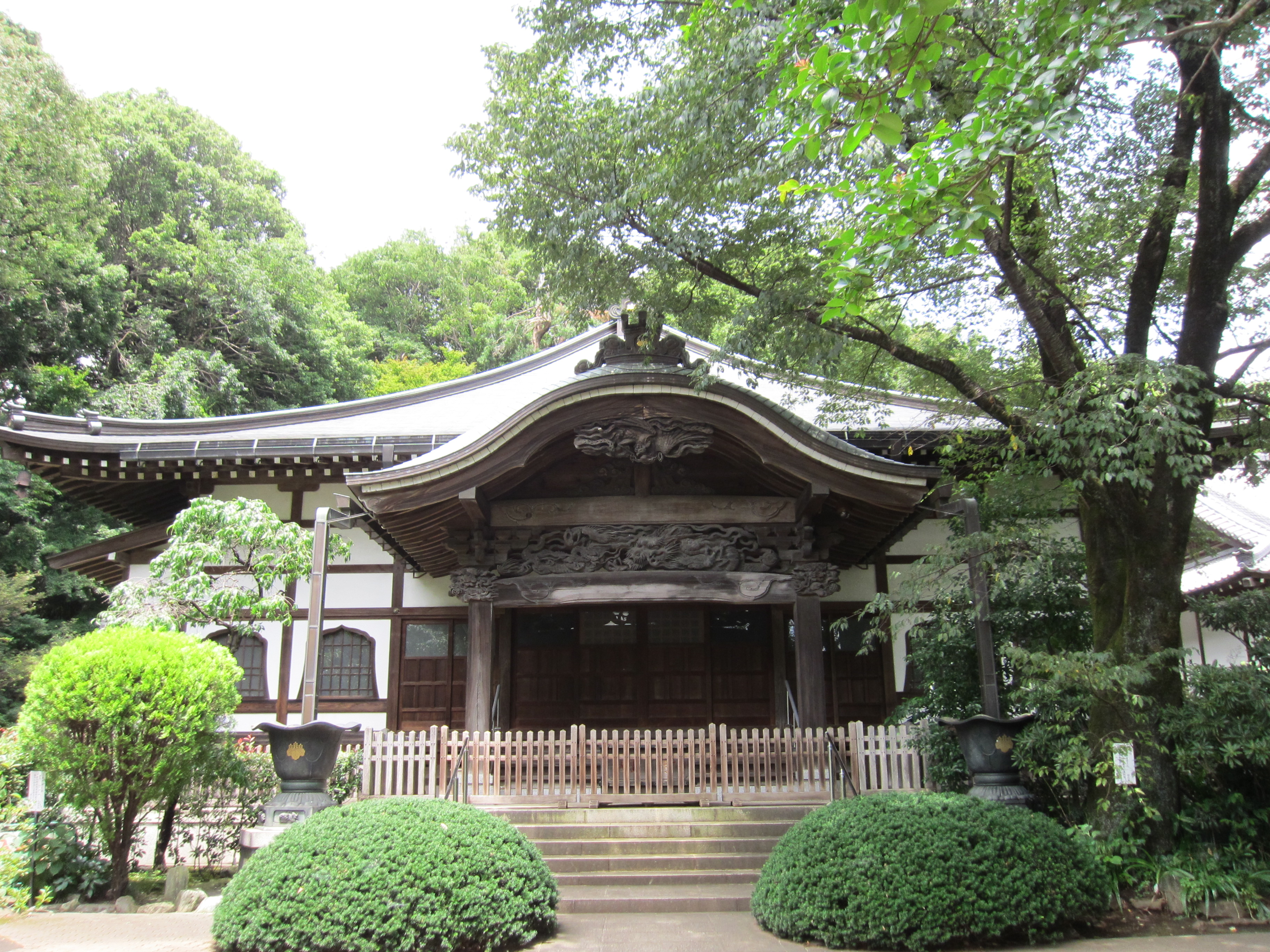
- Musashi Kokubun-ji Hondo

- Location within Tokyo Location within Japan

Religion
- Affiliation: Buddhist
- Deity: Yakushi Nyorai
- Rite: Shingon-shu Buzan-ha
- Status: active

Location
- Location: Kokubunji, Tokyo
- Country: Japan
- Interactive map of Musashi Kokubun-ji
- Coordinates: 35°41′52″N 139°28′09″E

Architecture
- Founder: Emperor Shōmu
- Completed: 741AD
- National Historic Site of Japan National Important Cultural Property

The Musashi Kokubun-ji (武蔵国分寺) is a Buddhist temple located in the city of Kokubunji, Tokyo, Japan. It belongs to the Shingon-shū Buzan-ha sect, and its main image is a hibutsu statue of Yakushi Nyōrai, displayed in public only on October 10 each year. The temple claims to be the successor to the original Nara period provincial temple ("kokubunji") of former Musashi Province, which fell into ruins sometime in the Kamakura period. The Nara-period temple ruins were designated a National Historic Site in 1921, with the area under protection extended in 1976, 1979, and 2010 as archaeological excavations revealed more of its ruins.

== Musashi Kokubun-ji ==
The Shoku Nihongi records that in 741, as the country recovered from a major smallpox epidemic, Emperor Shōmu ordered that a monastery and nunnery be established in every province. These government-sponsored temples were constructed for the purpose of promoting Buddhism as the national religion of Japan and standardiziing control of imperial rule over the provinces.

The Musashi Kokubun-ji and its associated Musashi Kokubun-niji provincial nunnery occupy a combined site extending 1500 meters from east-to-west by 1000 meters north-to-south, with the route of the Musashi extension of the Tōsandō highway (東山道武蔵路) passing through the center of the site. The Tōsandō was one of the ancient highways of Japan, connecting the capital at Heijō-kyō (modern-day Nara) and later Heian-kyō (modern-day Kyoto) with the northern tip of Honshū via the mountainous central provinces. However, the Tōsandō itself did not pass through Musashi Province, and this branch road connected the nearby Musashi Kokufu provincial capital with the highway. The Musashi Kokubun-ji was located on the west side of the highway, and the Musashi Kokubun-niji was located on the east. Archaeological excavations of the Musashi Kokubun-ji have been ongoing for decades, and much of the core of the temple has been uncovered, including the foundations of the Kondō, Lecture Hall, North Chapel, East Chapel, Middle Gate, and the Seven-story Pagoda. The complex was completed between 750 and 760 AD, and was on an unusually large scale, with the precincts rivaling Tōdai-ji in Nara in size. The Kondō was a 7-bay building with a front of 36 meters. Per then Shoku Nihon Kōki, the pagoda was destroyed by lightning in 835 AD and was rebuilt in 845 AD. The temple was destroyed in 1333 during the Battle of Bubaigawara, which was part of the Genkō War to overthrow the Kamakura shogunate. The site is now preserved as an archaeological park.

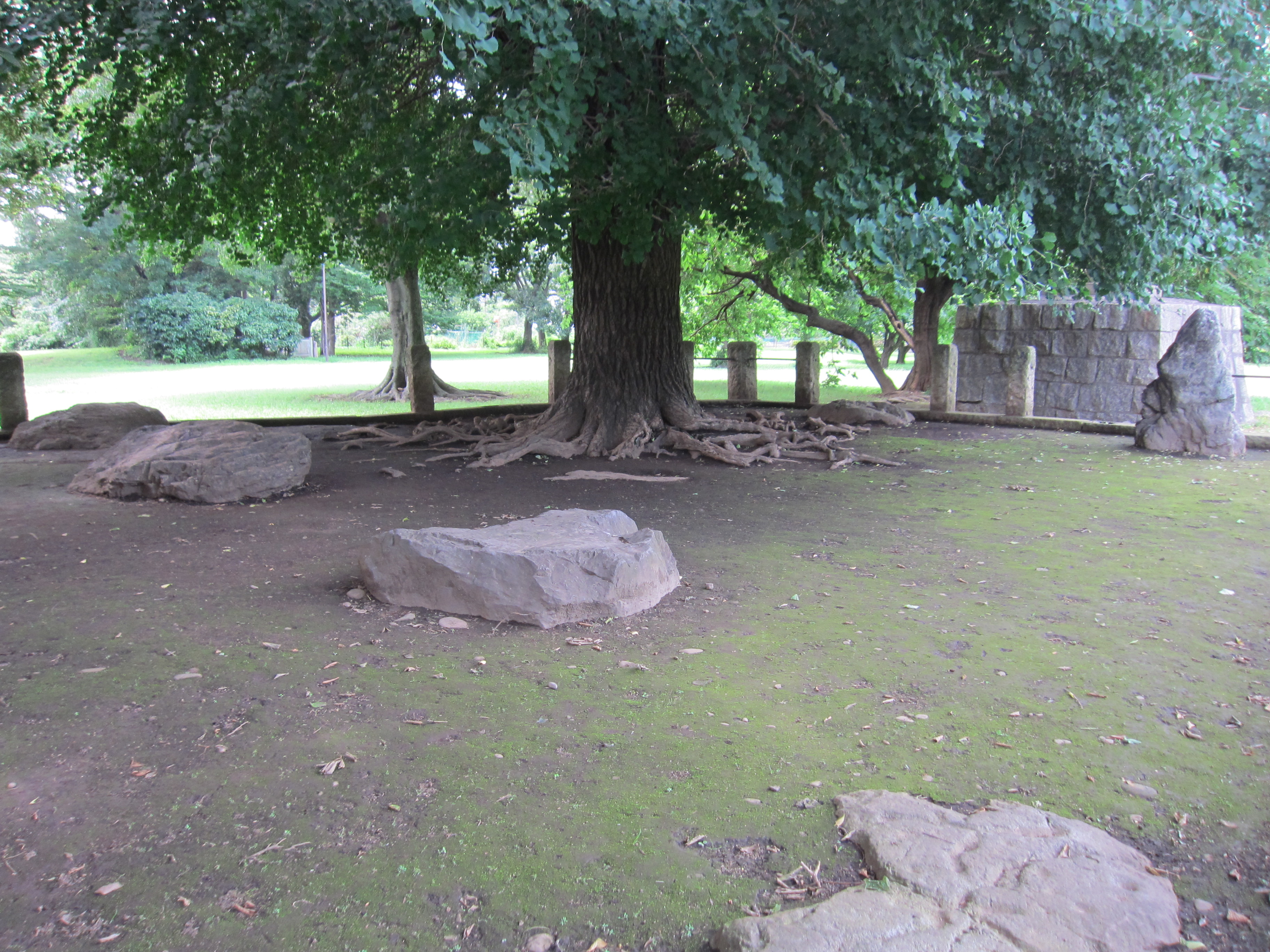
site of the Pagoda

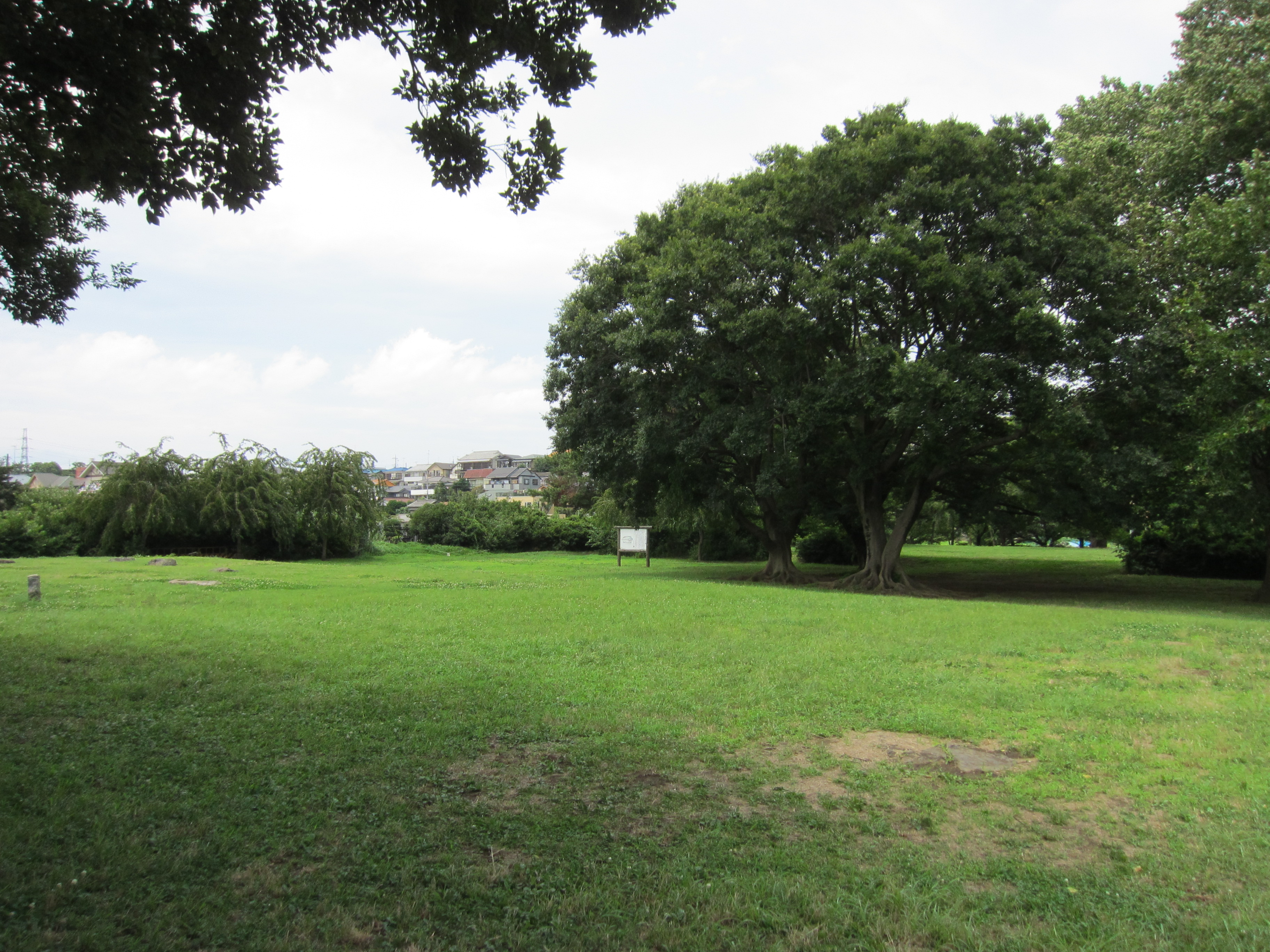
Site of the Kondō

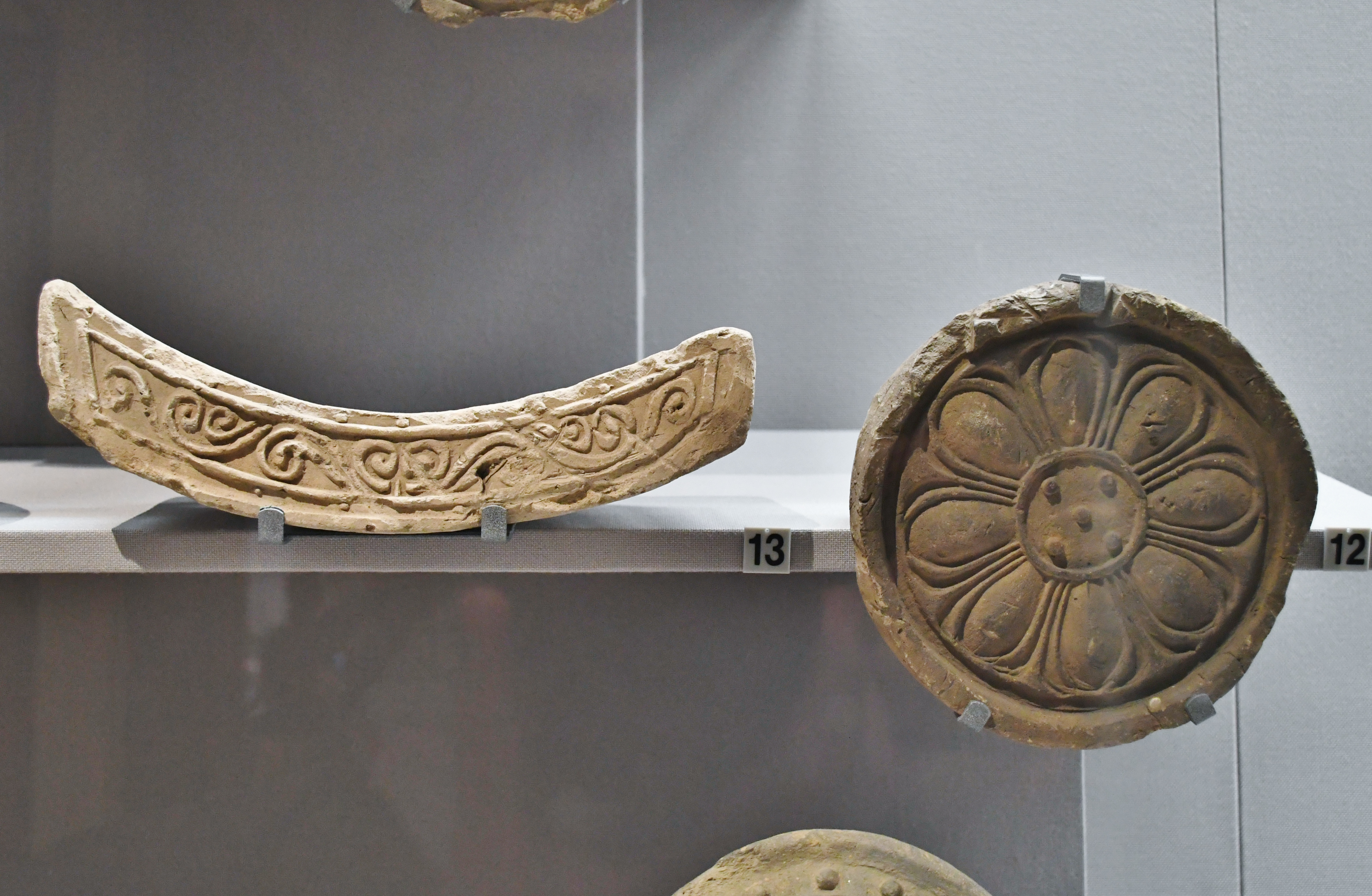
Roof tiles from the Musashi Kokubun-ji

=== Modern Musashi Kokubun-ji ===
The modern Musashi Kokubun-ji is located on a portion of the site. It claims to have been rebuilt by Nitta Yoshisada in 1335. The temple was reconstructed in 1751-1763. The temple is approximately 15-minutes on foot from Nishi-Kokubunji Station on the JR East Musashino Line.

The main image of the temple, a standing statue of Yakushi Nyōrai, dates from the late Heian period to the early Kamakura period and may be a survivor of the original temple. It is a National Important Cultural Property.

A standing bronze statue of Kannon Bosatsu and a green-glazed floral plate excavated from the grounds of the temple have been designated as Tokyo Metropolitan Tangible Cultural Properties. Both are kept at the Musashi Kokubunji Temple Ruins Museum.

The temple's Niōmon Gate, Yakushi-dō, Rōmon Gate, as well as artifacts recovered in archaeological excavations of the temple grounds and nine "red seal" letters of the Tokugawa shogunate to the temple ( kept at the Musashi Kokubunji Temple Ruins Museum) have all been designated as Tangible Cultural Properties of Kokubun-ji city.

The Musashi Kokubunji Temple Ruins Museum also preserves artifacts from the Musashi Takikubo Site No. 1 Dwelling Site (武蔵多喜窪遺跡第一号住居跡), which is located on a ridge overlapping the temple site. This site contains a settlement from the middle Jōmon period through the Nara period. It was excavated from 1949 to 1950, and numerous pit dwelling sites were discovered, with artifacts mainly found around the hearths, and included a wide variety of Jōmon pottery and stone tools. The pottery in particular is particularly noteworthy, with some incorporating snake-body decorations into their designs. The artifacts are collectively designated as a National Important Cultural Property.

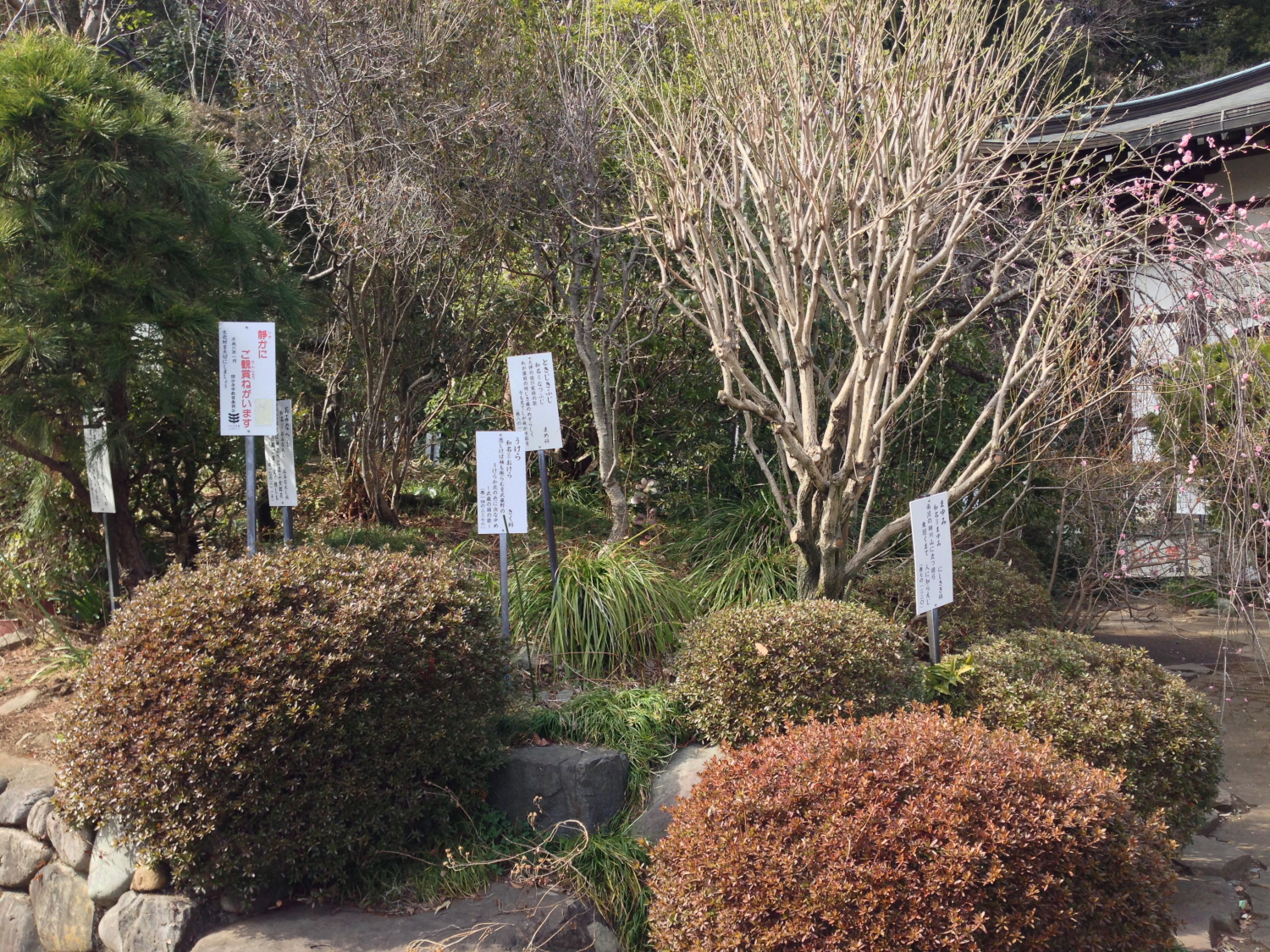
Man'yō gardens

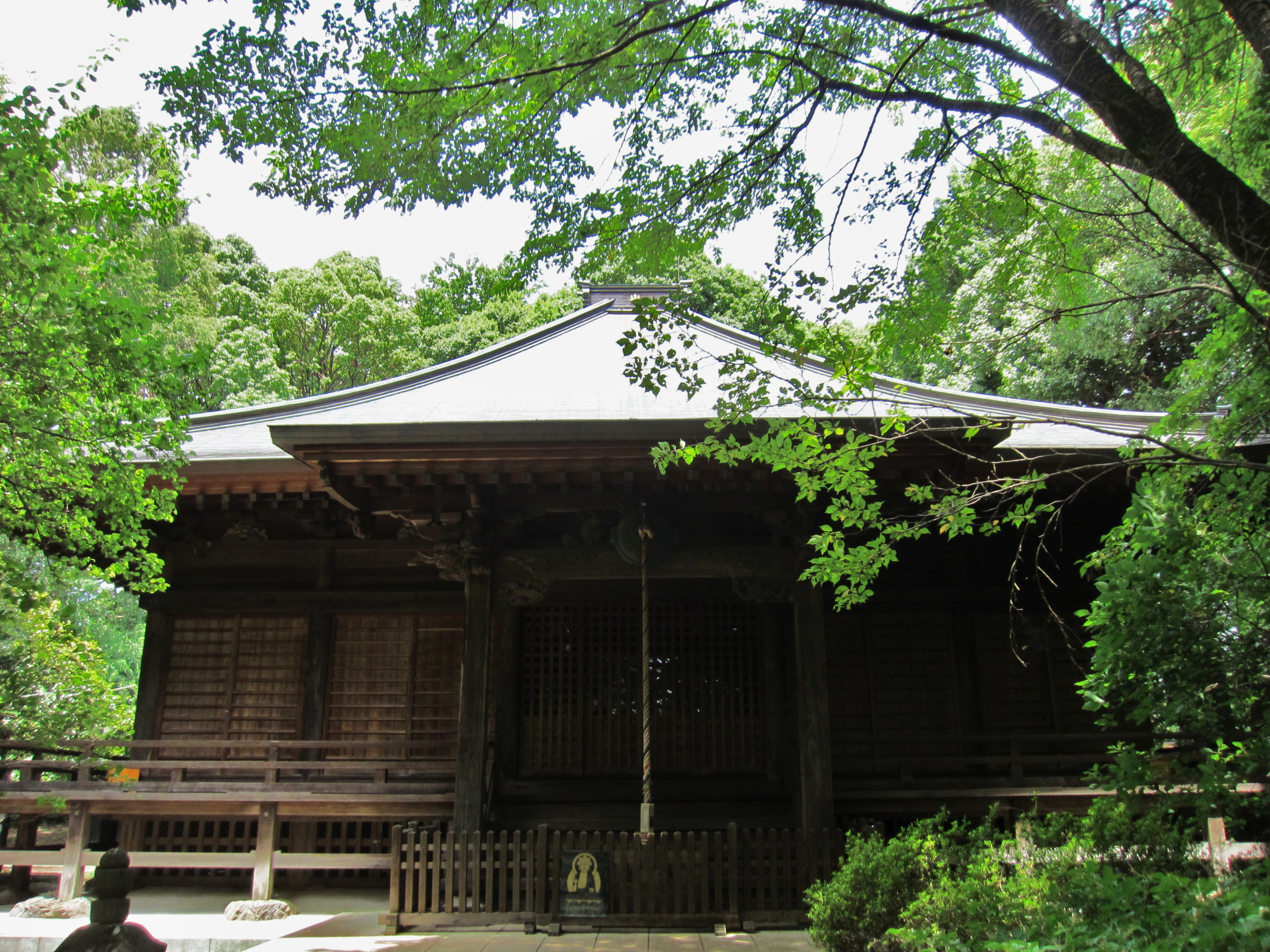
Yakushi-dō

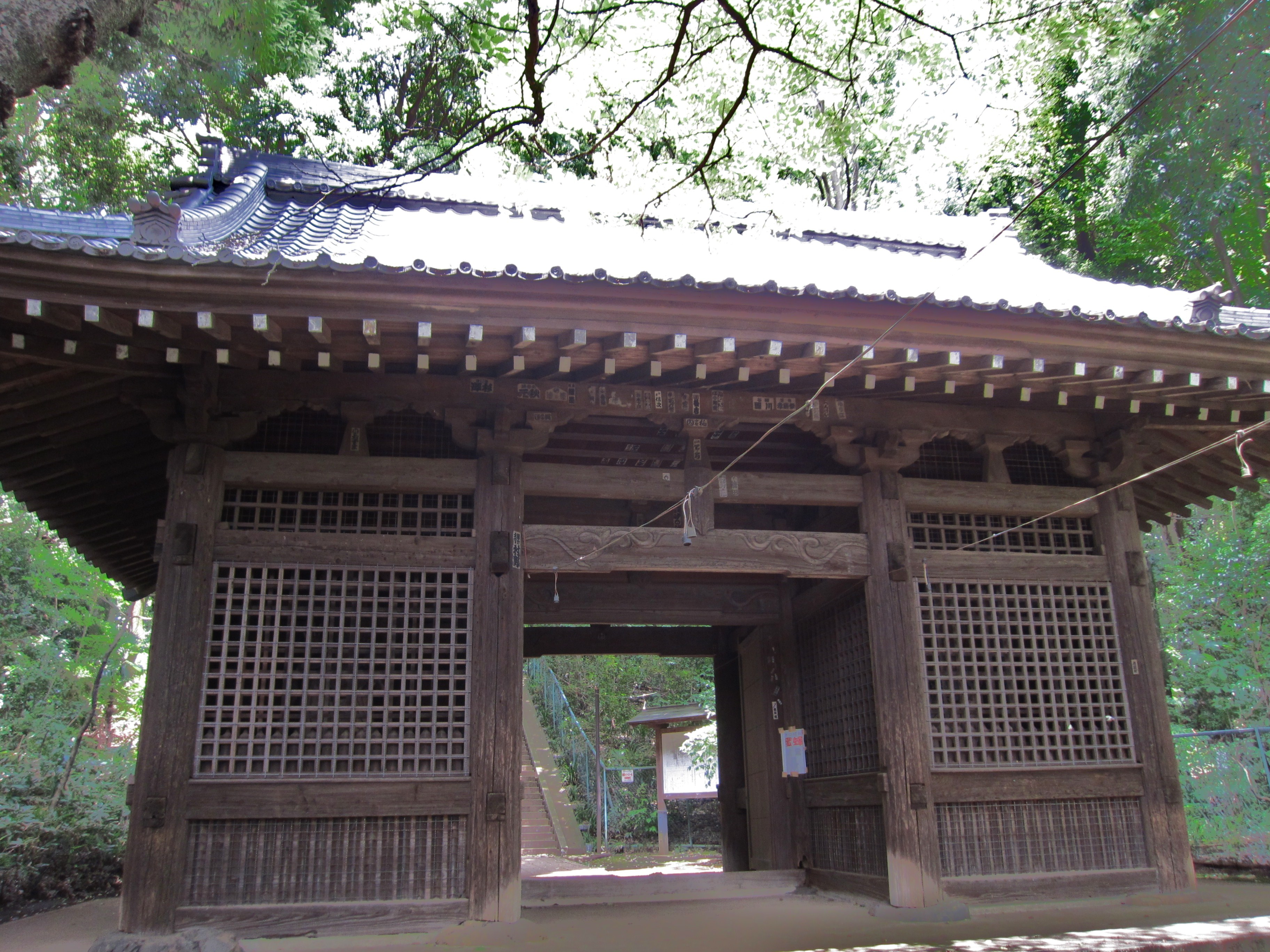
Niōmon

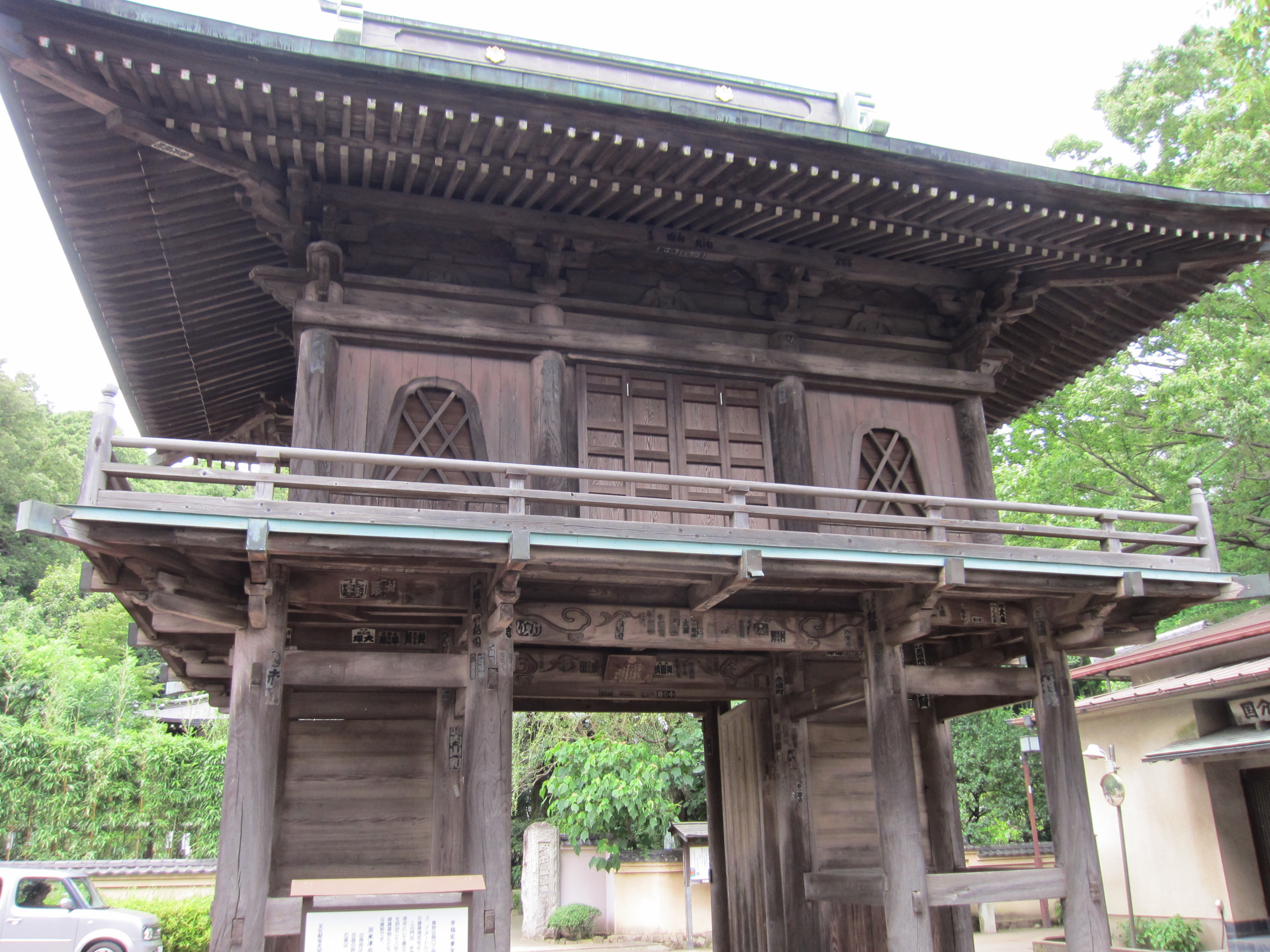
Rōmon

== Cultural Properties ==
=== National Important Cultural Properties ===
- Wooden statue of seated Yakushi Nyorai (木造薬師如来坐像), late Heian to early Kamakura period
- Excavated items from the Musashi Takikubo ruins (武蔵多喜窪遺跡第一号住居跡出土品), Jōmon period

== Musashi Kokubun-niji ==
The ruins of the nunnery associated with the Musashi Kokubun-ji are on a much smaller scale and in a poor state of preservation. They are located to the west of the Musashi Kokubun-ji. The layout of the temple remains unclear, but portions of the foundations of the Kondō, Middle Gate and part of the nun's residence have been identified, along with a portion of the palisade which once surrounded the complex. However, ruins of the Lecture Hall, South Gate, belfry, sutra library, and other structures appear to have been destroyed due to urban encroachment. The nun's residence had five rooms, and it is thought that a total of about ten nuns lived there.

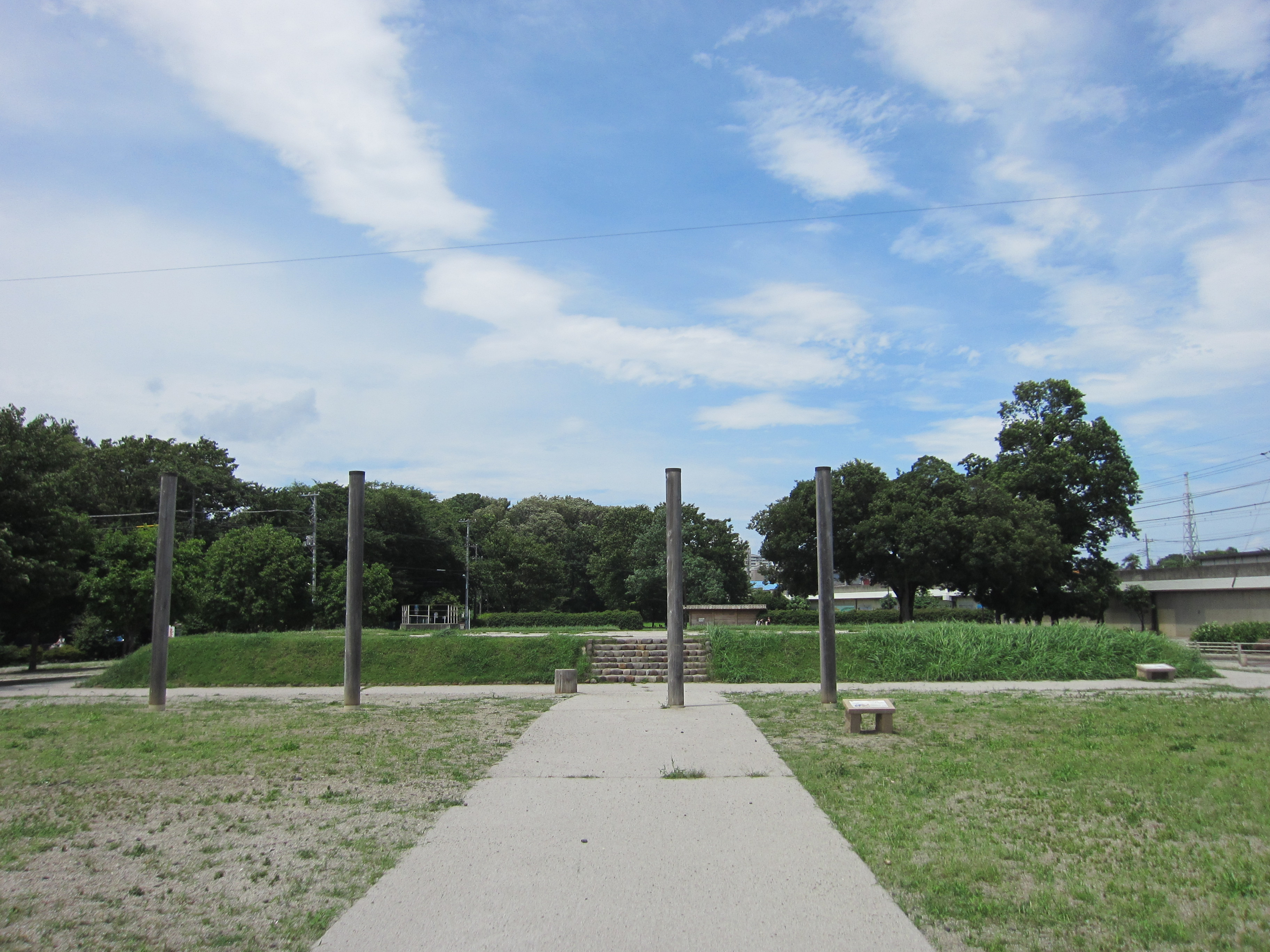
Site of the Kondō

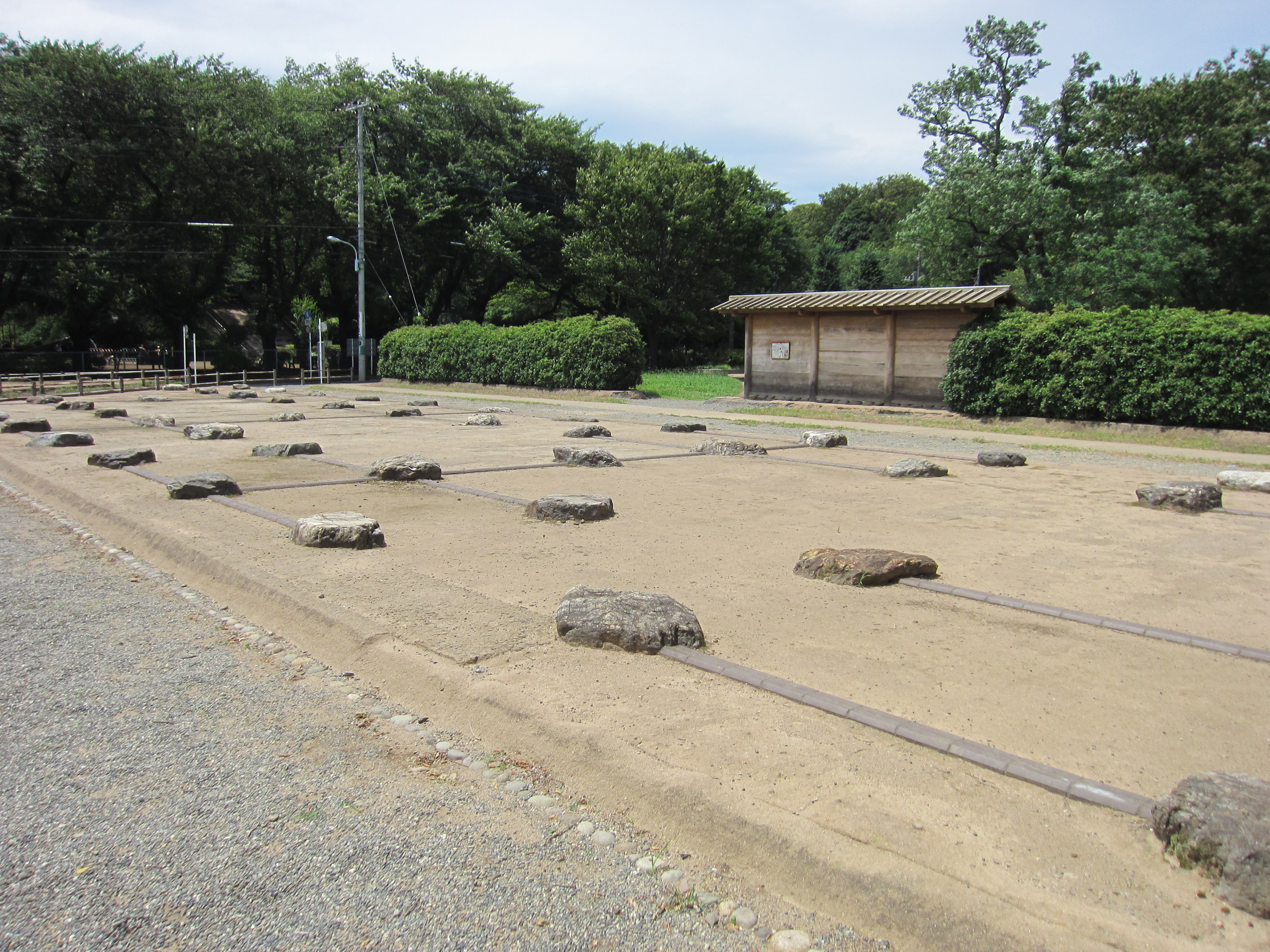
Site of the nun's quarters

== See also ==
- Provincial temple
- List of Historic Sites of Japan (Tōkyō)
