= Battle of Kotesashi =

- Part of the Kamakura period
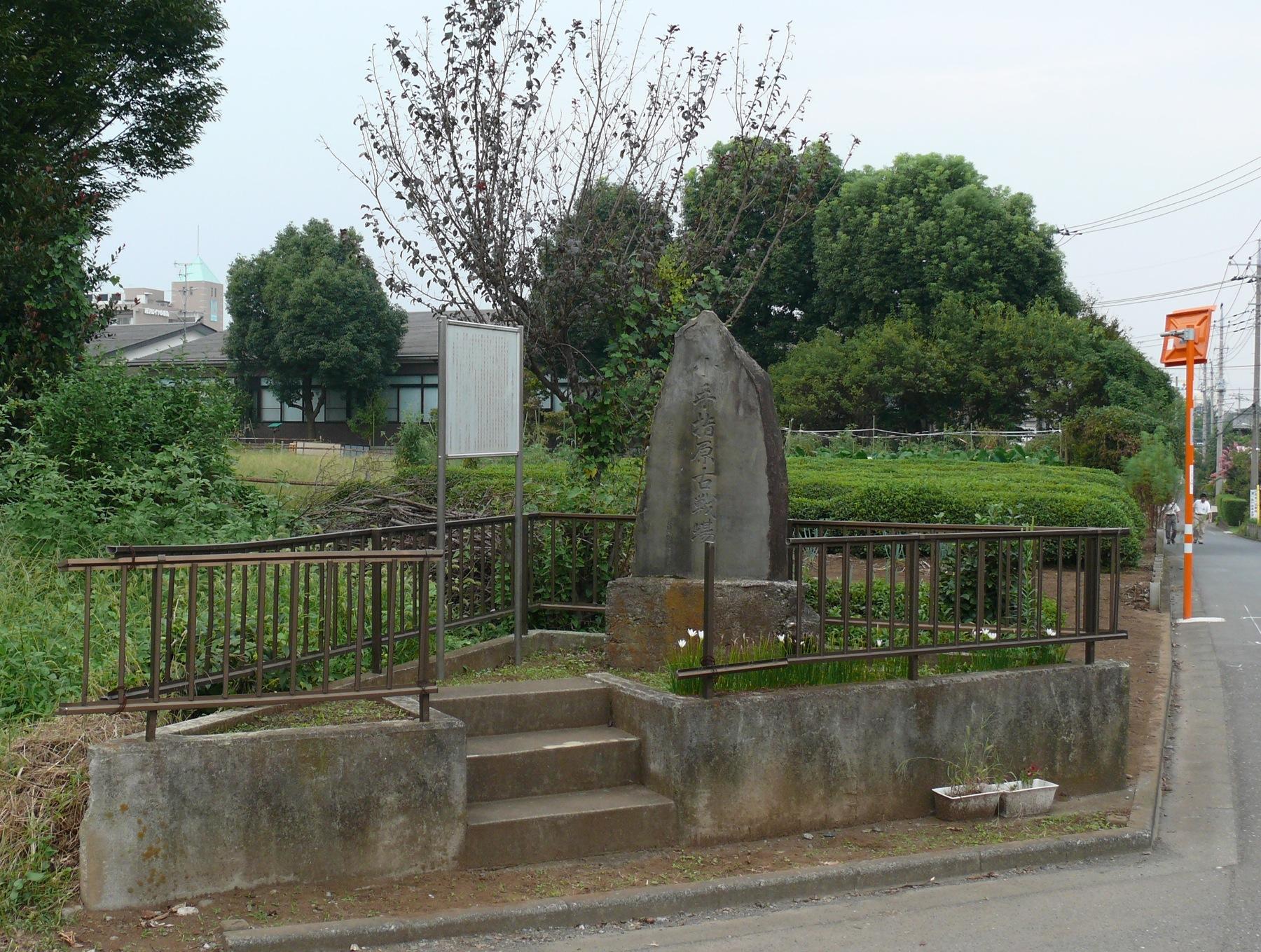
- Battle of Kotesashi monument
Date	May 11, 1333
Location	Kotesashi, present-day Tokorozawa, Saitama Japan 35°47′49.35″N 139°25′23.23″E
Result	Imperial victory

Belligerents
Forces loyal to the Kamakura Shogunate	Forces loyal to the Emperor Go-Daigo

Commanders and leaders
Sakurada Sadakuni	Nitta Yoshisada

The Battle of Kotesashi (小手指ヶ原の戦い, Kotesashi-gahara no tatakai) was part of the decisive Kōzuke-Musashi Campaign during the Genkō War in Japan that ultimately ended the Kamakura Shogunate. Fought in present-day Tokorozawa, Saitama on May 11, 1333, it pitted the anti-shogunate imperial forces led by Nitta Yoshisada against the pro-Shogunate forces of the Hōjō Regency led by Sakurada Sadakuni. The next day (May 12), the forces again engaged each other in the Battle of Kumegawa. The result of these two days was a victory for the Imperial forces who in less than one week marched 50 kilometers south and finally defeated the Shōgun's forces during the Siege of Kamakura.

== The battle ==
On May 11, opposing forces were drawn up on opposite sides of the Iruma River. In the morning of the May 11, the Imperial forces crossed the river and opened their attack with an archery barrage. The Shogunate forces responded in kind. This was followed by both sides sending in their mounted warriors in multiple waves throughout the day.

== Results ==
The results were indecisive with both forces drawing away at the day's end to set up camp and rest. The losses on both sides appear to be modest with a slight advantage to the Imperial forces. It was apparent to both sides that the battle would continue the next day. The Imperial forces camped by the Iruma River and forces of the Shōgun some 5 kilometers away at the Kume River.

== Aftermath ==
The Battle of Kotesashi was immediately followed on the next day by the Battle of Kumegawa.
