= Hachikokuyama =

Park in Tokyo, Japan

- 八国山
- Location within Saitama Prefecture

Highest point
- Elevation: 100 m (330 ft)
- Coordinates: 35°46′07″N 139°27′20″E

Geography
- Location: Tokorozawa, Saitama, Japan and Higashimurayama, Tokyo, Japan
- Parent range: Sayama Hills

Climbing
- Easiest route: Hiking trails

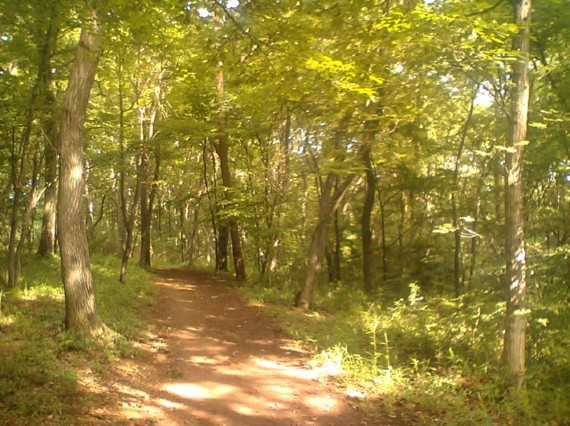
Hachikokuyama with sunlight

Hachikokuyama (八国山緑地, Hachikokuyama Ryōkuchi) is a ridge and park in Higashimurayama, Tokyo along its border with Tokorozawa, Saitama. Its name translates literally into English as "Eight Country Mountain" since, in the past, one could view the eight surrounding provinces surrounding Musashi Province from its top including Suruga, Kai, Izu, Sagami, Hitachi, Kozuke, Shimotsuke, and Shinano. The park was opened in 1990. In Japanese it is designated as a ryokuchi (緑地, green zone) instead of a park.

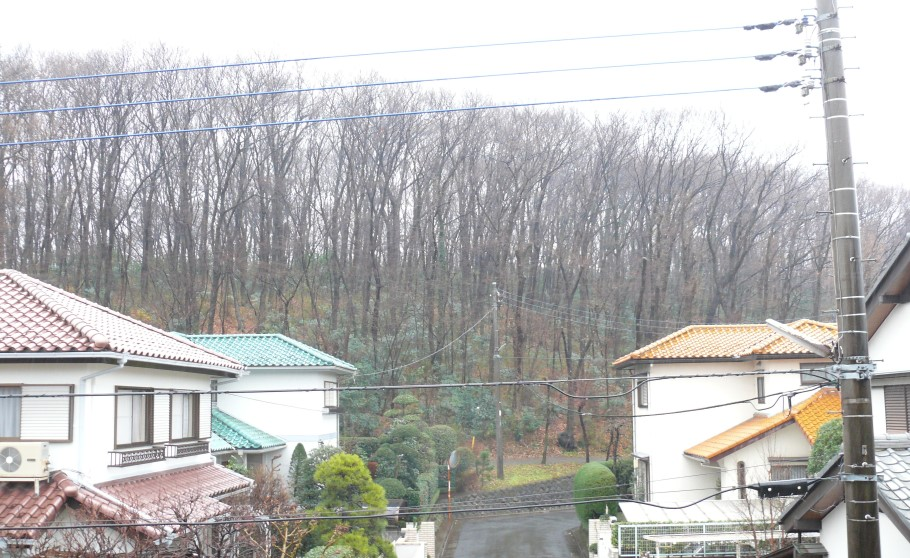
Hachikokuyama in winter

The park lies upon a low rising ridge rising about 15 to 20 meters above the surrounding plain. The highest elevation is about 100 meters above sea level. Measured from north to south, the park is from 100 to 300 meters, the park having an uneven size. From east to west the park is about 1.5 kilometers. The trail that runs the length of the ridge top is about 2.0 kilometers and branches into many secondary trails. The total size of the park of is about 39 hectares or about 96 acres.

== Historical significance ==
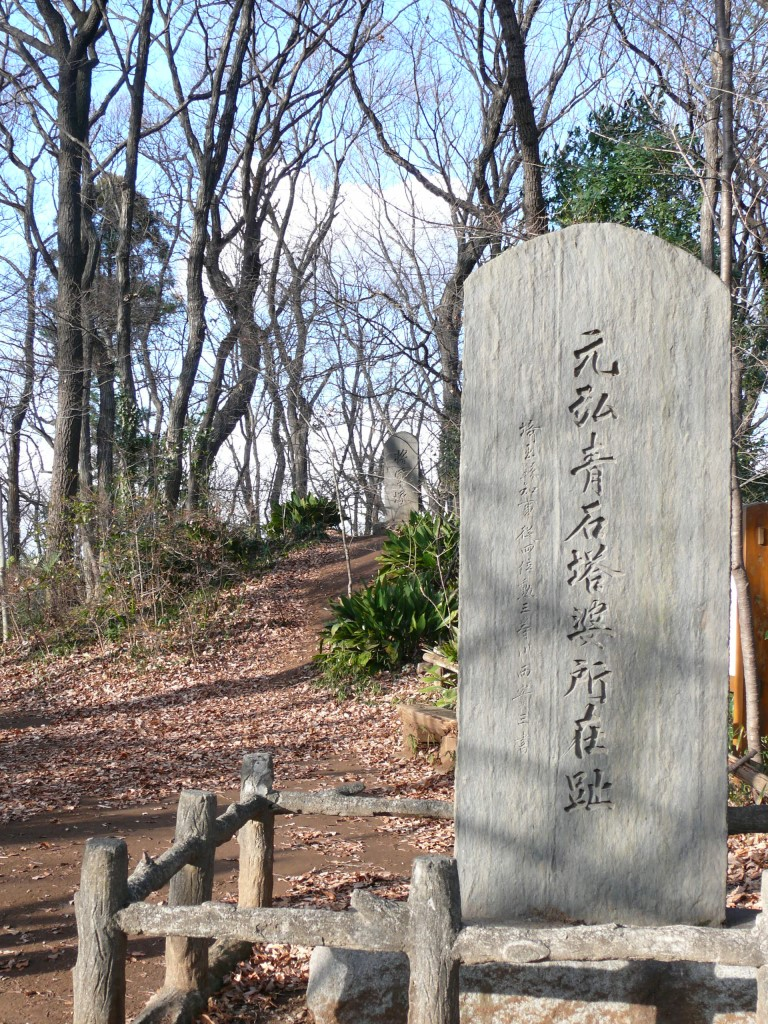
Nitta Yoshisada banner monument

The park contains an archaeological site, the Shimoyakebe Site (下宅部遺跡) dating from the Jōmon period with the remnants of irrigation and waterworks from the Jōmon through Muromachi periods. Numerous Sue ware pottery fragments have been found in the area.

The route of the ancient Tōsandō highway passed through what is now this park. In the year 1333, Nitta Yoshisada established a campaign headquarters and raised his army's banner on a mound in what is now part of the park during the Kōzuke-Musashi Campaign against the Kamakura shogunate. This mound was either an ancient kofun burial mound or a Fujizuka mound dedicated to the worship of Mount Fuji, but is now known as the Shogunzuka (将軍塚). This location is commemorated by a stone marker at the park's north eastern end.

Admission to the park is free of charge.

== Hachikokuyama in popular culture ==
It is famous for being an inspiration for parts of the anime film My Neighbor Totoro. The film's creator Hayao Miyazaki has acknowledged that Hachikokuyama Park served as a significant inspiration for the setting of My Neighbor Totoro. He lived in the area during the 1960s, and his experiences there deeply influenced the film’s depiction of rural life and natural landscapes. Miyazaki once guided Studio Ghibli producer Toshio Suzuki through Hachikokuyama Park, referring to it as the place where Totoro was “born”.

The hospital featured in the film, where the protagonists’ mother is hospitalized, was modeled after Shin-Yamanote Hospital, located near Hachikokuyama Park.

== Gallery ==
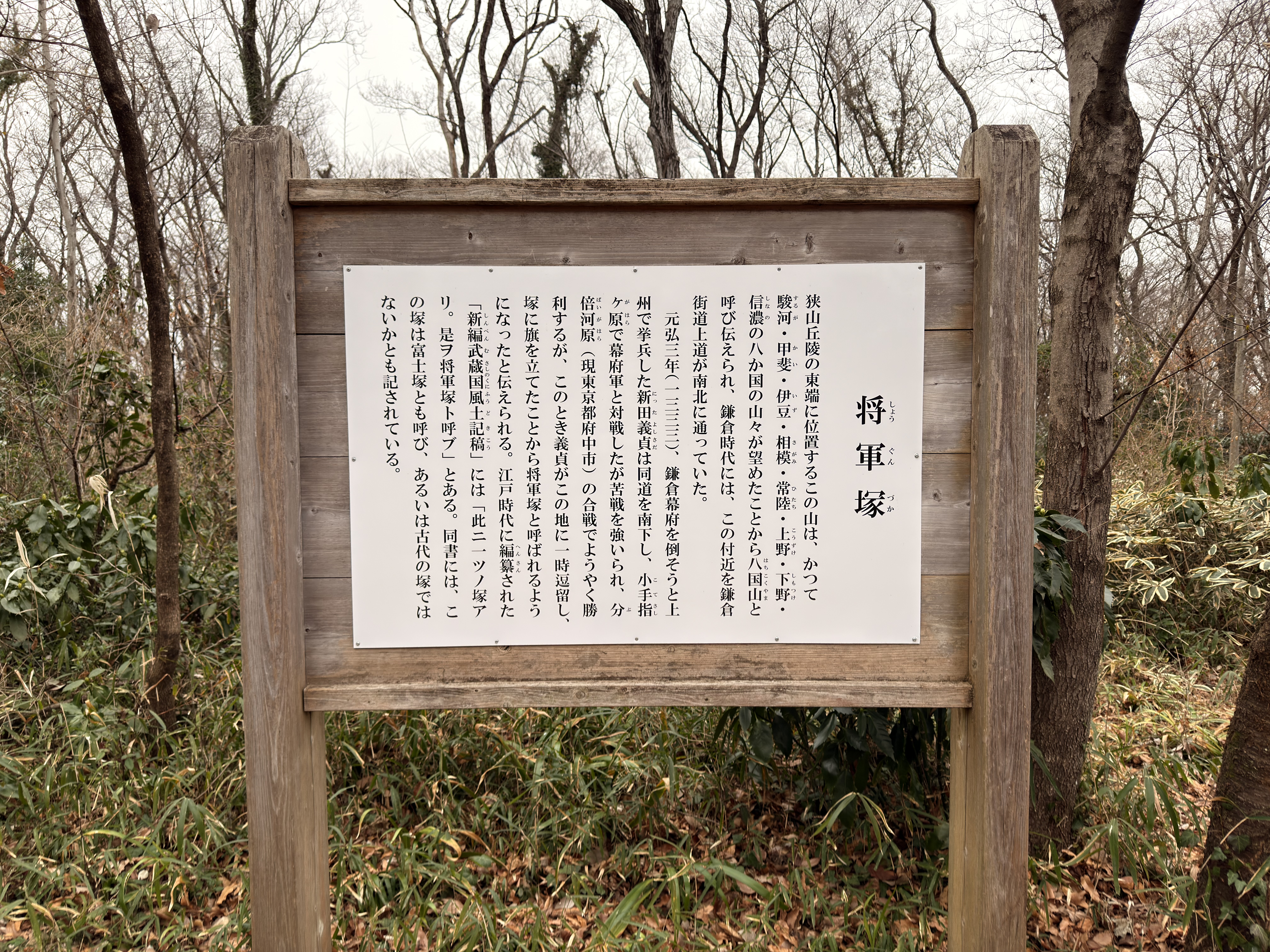
Descriptive sign of the significance of the shougunzuka site as well as where it is located.

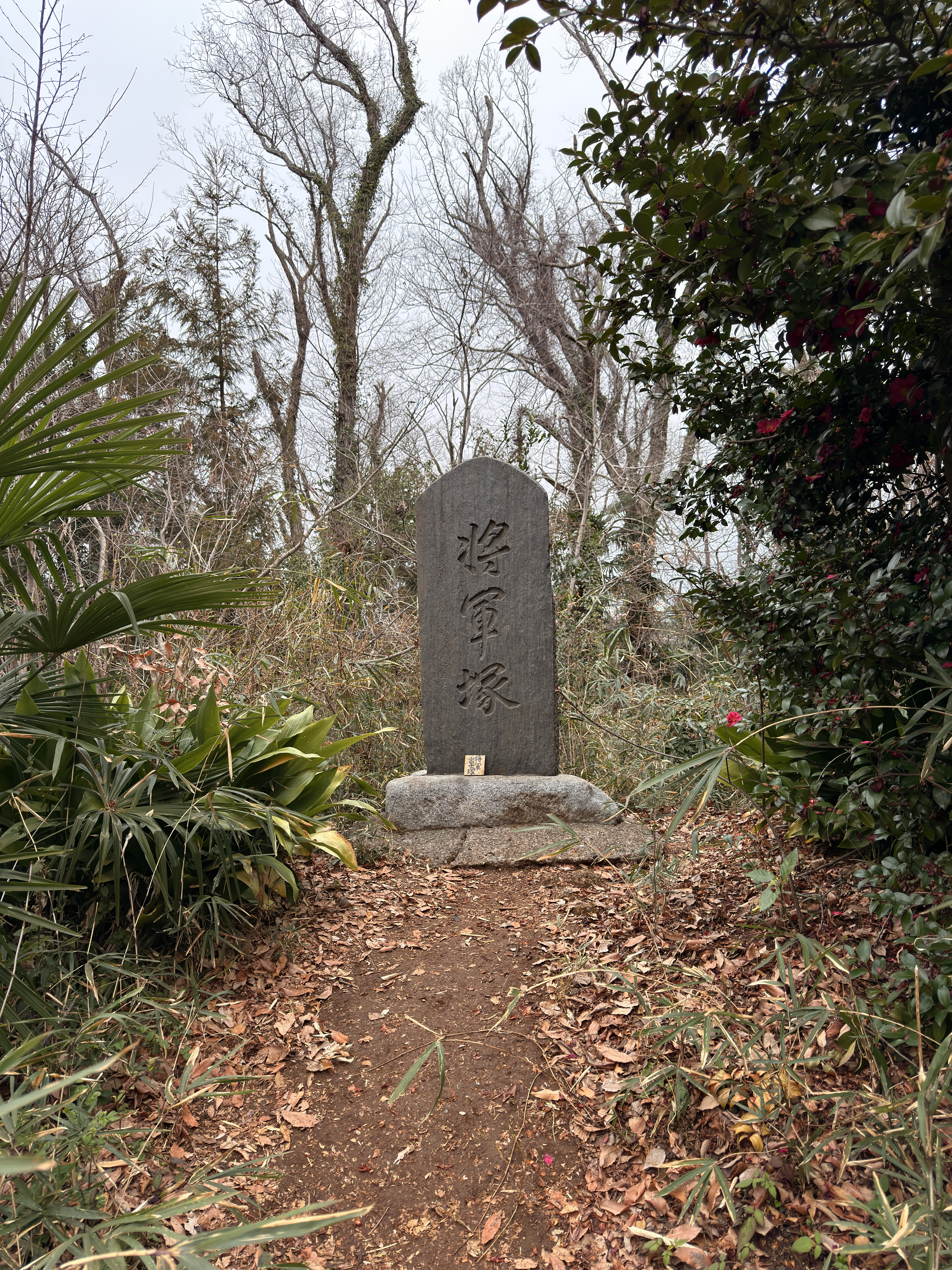
Stele on the top of Shogunzuka mound. The mound may originally be from the Jomon period.

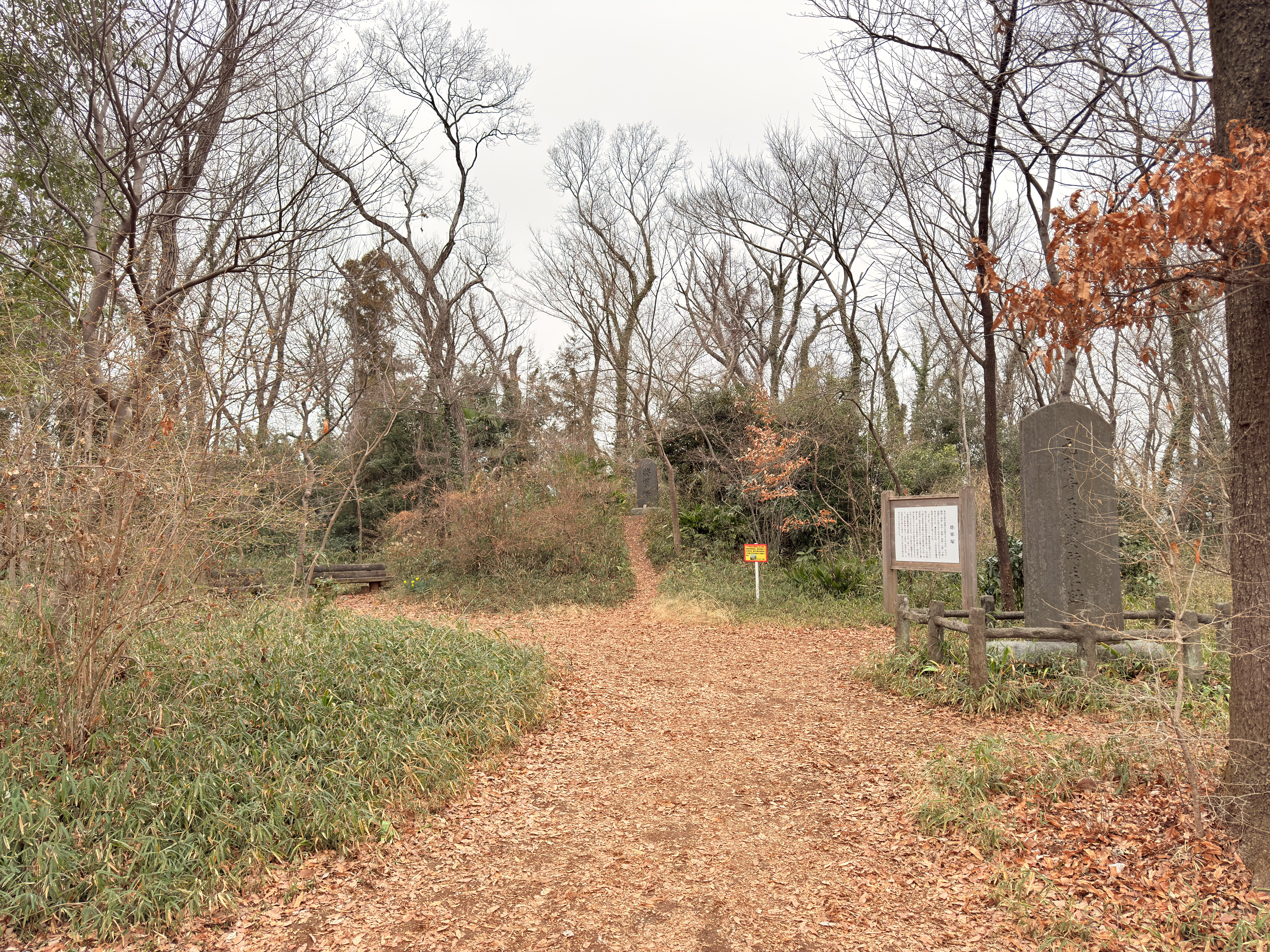
Shogunzuka site. The mound is at the elevated area at the center.

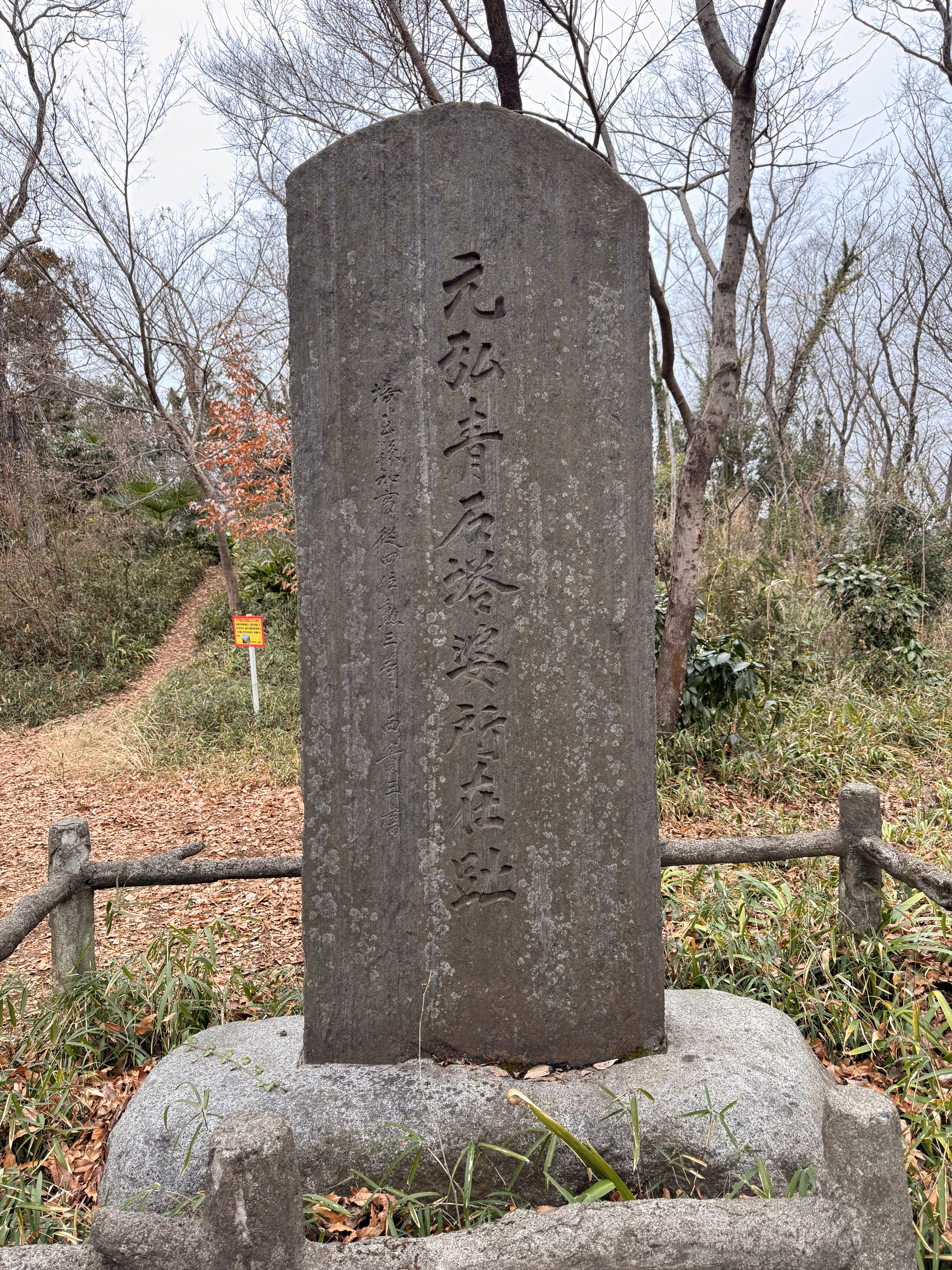
Shogunzuka location stele on Hachikokuyama, Tokyo/Saitama, Japan.
