= Kōzuke–Musashi campaign =

Kōzuke–Musashi
- Part of the Genkō War
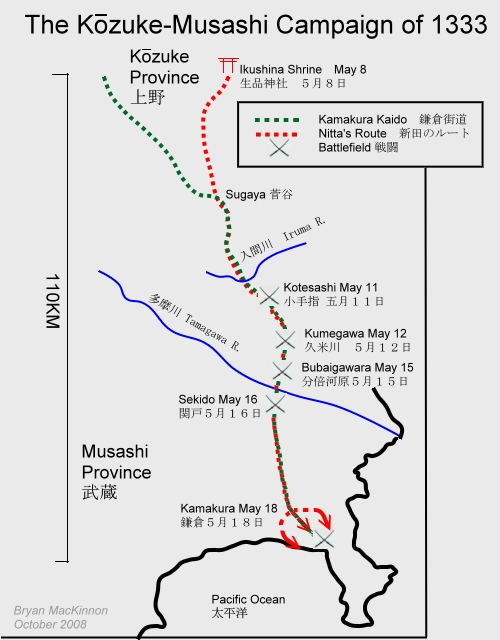
- Nitta Yoshisada led an army over 100 kilometers in ten days with major engagements against the Shogunate forces in four locations.
Date	May, 1333
Location	Kōzuke Province, Musashi Province
Result	Nitta victory

Belligerents
Forces loyal to Emperor Go-Daigo	Hōjō clan

Commanders and leaders
Nitta Yoshisada	Kanazawa Sadamasa, Sakurada Sadakuni, Nagasaki Takashige, Nagasaki Saemon, Kaji Saemon.

The Kōzuke–Musashi campaign was a rapid and direct assault during the Japanese Genkō War by Nitta Yoshisada that led up to the Siege of Kamakura in 1333. It consisted of a number of battles over a brief period. The ultimate result was the ending of the Kamakura Shogunate.

== Background ==
By the first part of the 14th century, the Kamakura Shogunate, which had never fully recovered from successfully fending off the Mongol Invasions, was already engaging a resurgent imperial house under Go-Daigo during the Genkō War. Go-Daigo's son Prince Morinaga energetically organized an uprising against the Hōjō recruiting a number of the key martial leaders that supported the Emperor including Kusunoki Masashige. Early in 1333 Morinaga and Kusunoki, the latter being entrenched at Chihaya, were the targets of a large army sent from Kamakura to destroy the uprising. This left Kamakura relatively undefended.

Nitta Yoshisada, who was originally supporting the Hojo Regents of Kamakura, was convinced to support the imperial cause. From his home base in Kōzuke Province, Nitta and a group of other nobles including his brother Yoshisuke took advantage of the lightly defended Kamakura and entered Musashi Province in force. Following the important Kamakura Kaidō highway, Nitta's army received fresh recruits along the way from local powerful clans and repeatedly engaged the Hojo forces until reaching the outskirts of Kamakura, thus beginning the Siege of Kamakura.

== The campaign ==
Nitta's forces entered Musashi from Kōzuke and joined the Kamakura Kaidō at Sugaya. The principle battles were:

- Battle of Kotesashi (May 11, 1333)
- Battle of Kumegawa (May 12, 1333)
- Battle of Bubaigawara (and Sekido) (May 15–16, 1333)
