= Genkō War =

Civil war in Imperial Japan (1331–1333)

- Part of the 14th century Imperial-Shogunal conflicts
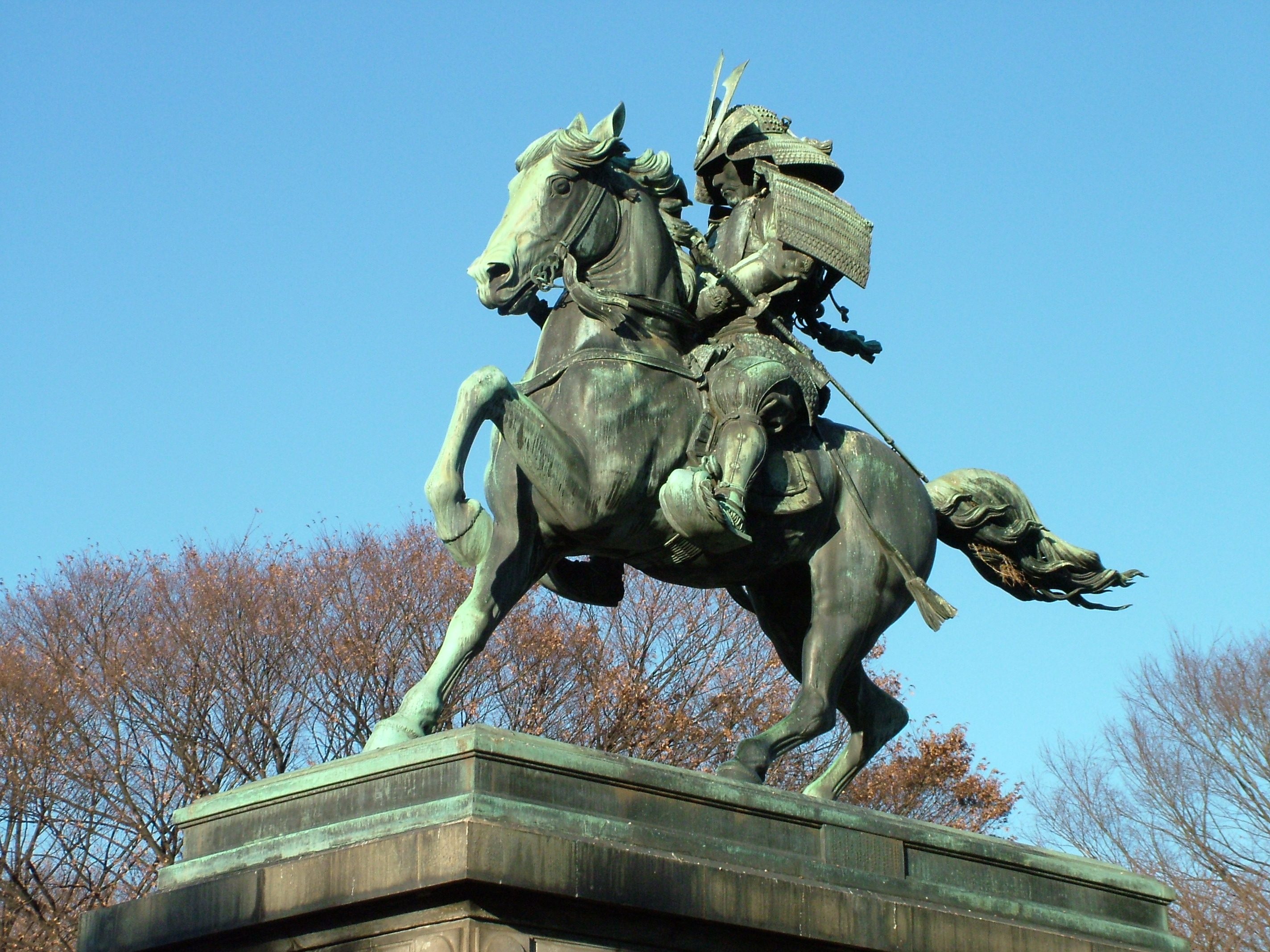
- A statue of Kusunoki Masashige outside the Imperial Palace in Tokyo
Date	1331–1333
Location	Japan
Result	Imperial victory
Territorial changes	Fall of the Kamakura Shogunate

Belligerents
Imperial forces loyal to Emperor Go-Daigo	Kamakura Shogunate

Commanders and leaders
Emperor Go-Daigo; Prince Moriyoshi; Ashikaga Takauji; Nitta Yoshisada; Kusunoki Masashige; Murakami Yoshiteru	Hōjō Mototoki †; Hōjō Takatoki †; Hōjō Sadaaki †; Hōjō Moritoki †

The Genkō War (元弘の乱, Genkō no Ran), also known as the Genkō Incident (元弘の變, Genkō no Hen), was a civil war fought in Japan between the Emperor Go-Daigo and the Kamakura Shogunate from 1331 to 1333. The Genkō War was named after Genkō, the Japanese era corresponding to the period of 1331 to 1334 when the war occurred.

== Background ==
Go-Daigo became Emperor of Japan in 1318 and sought to remove the Kamakura Shogunate, which had ruled Japan as a de facto military government from the city of Kamakura since the Genpei War in 1185, and restore power to civilian government under the Imperial House in Kyoto. The Kamakura Shogunate was indirectly ruled by the Hōjō clan as shikken – the regents of the Shōgun – and actively blocked the Emperor's manoeuvres to restore Imperial rule.

== Conflict ==
=== First uprising ===
In 1331, Go-Daigo plotted to seize power through force and overthrow the Kamakura Shogunate by encouraging his vassals and other anti-Hōjō samurai to rebel. However, Go-Daigo was betrayed when his trusted adviser Fujiwara Sadafusa alerted the shogunate, who dispatched troops to Kyoto to suppress the uprising. Go-Daigo fled Kyoto with the Sacred Treasures and sought refuge in Kasagi, a secluded monastery overlooking the Kizu River. Go-Daigo managed to escape Kasagi when it was attacked by Kamakura troops in the Siege of Kasagi, but was soon apprehended. Go-Daigo was subsequently exiled to the Oki Islands and the Kamakura then enthroned Emperor Kōgon, the first Emperor of the "Northern Court", setting the stage for the upcoming Nanboku-chō period. Go-Daigo's son Prince Morinaga continued to fight against the Kamakura, leading his father's supporters alongside Kusunoki Masashige.

=== Second uprising ===
In 1333, Go-Daigo escaped Oki two years after his exile with the help of Nawa Nagatoshi (名和長年), raising a new Imperial army at Mount Senjō in Hōki Province, in the modern town of Kotoura, Tottori Prefecture. He defeated the forces of Sasaki Kiyotaka at the Battle of Mount Senjōsan and gained the support of many warlords in western Japan against the Hōjō. Meanwhile, Ashikaga Takauji, the chief general of the Hōjō, was dispatched west to fight against Go-Daigo's second uprising. However, for unknown reasons, Takauji defected to Go-Daigo's army shortly before reaching Kyoto, and began to fight against the Hōjō. The reason for Takauji's defection is unknown, but assumed to be because of his unofficial leadership of the Minamoto clan, the victors of the Genpei War and arch-rivals of the former Taira clan to which the Hōjō had belonged. Additionally, Takauji possibly hoped of being named Shōgun by Go-Daigo after his restoration to power. The Imperial army lifted the Siege of Chihaya and Imperial general Nitta Yoshisada won a string of victories in the Kōzuke–Musashi campaign in May, including the Siege of Chihaya, the Battle of Kotesashi, the Battle of Kumegawa, and the Battle of Bubaigawara. The Kamakura Shogunate was eventually defeated at the Siege of Kamakura in early July, when Imperial forces entered the destroyed city and the Hōjō committed suicide.

== Aftermath ==
Go-Daigo triumphantly returned to Kyoto and claimed power from Emperor Kōgon in what came to be known as the Kenmu Restoration. Go-Daigo's rule would only last three years as his policies disillusioned his supporters, and most of the accomplishments of the Genkō War were gradually undone. Many samurai who had fought for Go-Daigo were dissatisfied with their rewards, and his pursuit of consolidating Imperial power led to their subsequent exclusion from political affairs, whereas they had held significant influence under the shogunate. Japanese commoners were similarly dissatisfied as Go-Daigo failed to address the issues they had petitioned for him to resolve. In 1336, Ashikaga Takauji named himself the Shōgun and seized power from Emperor Go-Daigo, establishing the Ashikaga Shogunate based on the Kamakura system and marking the beginning the Nanboku-chō "Northern and Southern Courts" period.
