= Sugaya =

Sugaya (菅谷) is a Japanese surname. Notable people with the surname include:

- Kayo Sugaya (菅谷 佳代), Japanese table tennis player
- Masako Sugaya (菅谷 政子, 1937–2021), Japanese voice actress
- Mitsuru Sugaya (すがや みつる, born 1950), Japanese manga artist
- Risako Sugaya (菅谷 梨沙子, born 1994), Japanese singer and idol

== Fictional characters ==
- Sōsuke Sugaya (菅谷 創介), a character in the manga series Assassination Classroom

== See also ==
- Sugaya Station (菅谷駅, Sugaya-eki), train station in Tamura, Fukushima Prefecture, Japan
- Sugaya Yakata (菅谷館), former castle in Ranzan, Saitama Prefecture, Japan
