= Sakurada Sadakuni =

Sakurada Sadakuni is referred to in the Taiheiki as grand marshal in command of the Shogunate forces during the Kōzuke-Musashi Campaign.
