= Siege of Kamakura (1333) =

Imperial victory in the Genkō War

Coordinates: 35.3158°N 139.5502°E

- Part of the Genkō War
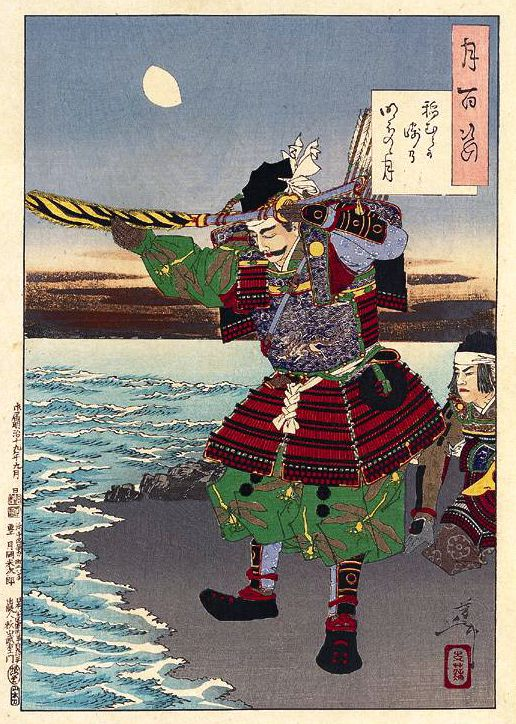
- Nitta Yoshisada offering his sword to the Sun Goddess
Date	18–22 May, 1333 (30 June–4 July O.S.)
Location	Kamakura, Sagami Province
Result	Imperial victory

Belligerents
Forces loyal to Emperor Go-Daigo	Hōjō clan

Commanders and leaders
Nitta Yoshisada	Hōjō Mototoki; Hōjō Takatoki; Osaragi Sadanao; Akahashi Moritoki; Kanazawa Aritoki

Strength
	15,000

The 1333 siege of Kamakura was a battle of the Genkō War, and marked the end of the power of the Hōjō clan, which had dominated the regency of the Kamakura shogunate for over a century. Forces loyal to Emperor Go-Daigo and led by Nitta Yoshisada entered the city from multiple directions and destroyed it; in the end, the Hōjō leaders retreated to Tōshō-ji, the Hōjō family temple, where they committed suicide with the rest of the clan.

== Background ==
For ten days, Nitta had been leading the imperial loyalists on a rapid cross country campaign before reaching the outskirts of Kamakura. After the Battle of Bubaigawara ended two days prior, the Hōjō forces rushed back to Kamakura to consolidate defenses. Nitta aggressively pursued and divided his forces into three prongs, thus completely surrounding the landward sides of the city. Only the seaward side, which was fortified by Hōjō ships, remained open.

== Battle for Kamakura ==
The hills surrounding Kamakura contained seven passes, (the so-called Seven Entrances or Mouths), each with guarded checkpoints. Nitta Yoshisada attacked from the west, east and the north through the Gokuraku Pass, the Nagoe Pass and the Kewaizaka Pass, dividing his forces in three. However, after many hours of fighting, little progress had been made towards the city, particularly on the western passes near Gokuraku-ji, which was guarded with rows upon rows of wooden shielding. Nitta realized the Gokuraku-ji could be bypassed by marching around the cape, where the Inamuragasaki promontory juts out into the water. However, the waters were fortified by Hōjō ships making the approach impossible without heavy losses. According to the chronicles, Nitta threw his sword into the sea as an offering to the sun goddess, Amaterasu, and the sea parted as if by a miracle clearing a beach wide enough for Nitta's army to traverse. Though in fact they were taking advantage of a very low tide.

Thus the imperial loyalists were able to enter the city, and began to force back the Hōjō forces. The Hōjō were eventually forced to retreat to a cave behind the Tōshō-ji, where they committed suicide.

== Bibliography ==
- McCullough, Helen Craig (1959). "The Taiheiki. A Chronicle of Medieval Japan." 1959. Charles E. Tuttle Company, Tokyo, ISBN 978-0-8048-3538-1.
