= Battle of Bubaigawara =

- Part of the Kamakura period
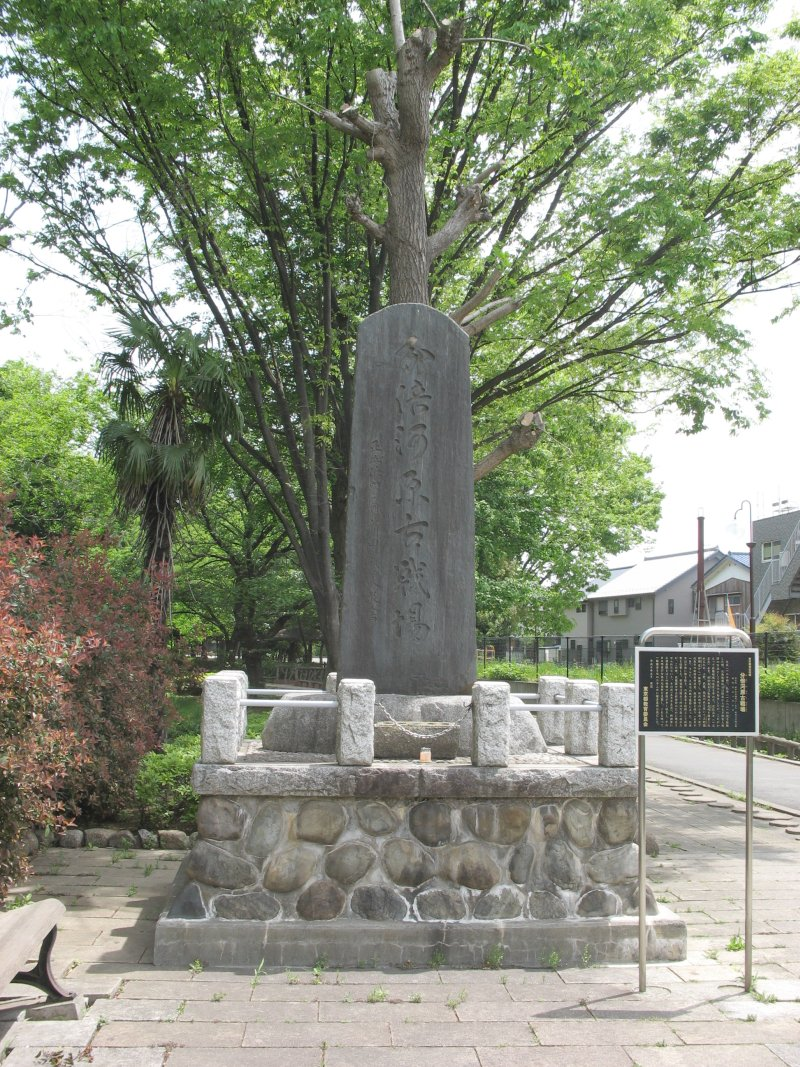
- Monument marking the site of the Battle of Bubaigawara
Date	May 15–16, 1333
Location	Bubaigawara, in present-day Fuchū, Tokyo 35°40′06″N 139°28′07″E
Result	Imperial victory

Belligerents
Forces loyal to the Kamakura Shogunate	Forces loyal to the Emperor Go-Daigo

Commanders and leaders
Hōjō Yasuie; Hōjō Sadakuni	Nitta Yoshisada

Strength
207,000	100,000

The Battle of Bubaigawara (分倍河原の戦い, Bubaigawara no tatakai) was part of the decisive Kōzuke-Musashi Campaign during the Genkō War in Japan that ultimately ended the Kamakura Shogunate. It was fought on the banks of the Tama River in central Musashi province in what is now part of the city of Fuchū, Tokyo on May 15 and 16, 1333, it pitted the anti-shogunate imperial forces led by Nitta Yoshisada against the forces of the Hōjō-led Kamakura shogunate. It was the final major battle in Kōzuke-Musashi Campaign and was preceded by the Battle of Kumegawa.

== The battle ==
After his victory three days earlier at the Battle of Kumegawa, Nitta Yoshisada took time to rest his horses and men. Meanwhile, the forces loyal to the Shogunate retreated to Bubaigawara to regroup. Unbeknownst to Nitta, the Shōgun's forces had received reinforcements on the 14th greatly restoring strength and morale.

As the Imperial forces advanced on Bubaigawara on the 15th, the Shōgun's forces attacked with a great archery barrage and thus halted the Imperial attack. The main body of the Shōgun's army then engaged Nitta's army, and despite aggressive counterattacks by Nitta, heavy losses forced Nitta to retreat.

Had the Shogunate forces immediately pressed their advantage of the First day, it was likely their victory would have been complete. However, during the night of the 15th, Nitta received critical reinforcements led by Miura Yoshikatsu. And at dawn on the 16th, Miura led his fresh troops and attacked an unsuspecting enemy. Nitta Yoshisada and his brother Nitta Yoshisuke advanced to the front while Miura harassed the enemy from the rear.

== The result ==
The battle resulted in a rout in favor of the Nitta brothers and Miura. Although the Shogunate forces held the initial advantage, their failure to exploit it led to defeat.

== Aftermath ==
The remnants of the Hōjō forces retreated in disarray to Kamakura where they regrouped. The forces led by Nitta pursued and were victorious during the Siege of Kamakura.
