= Taiheiki =

Japanese historical epic

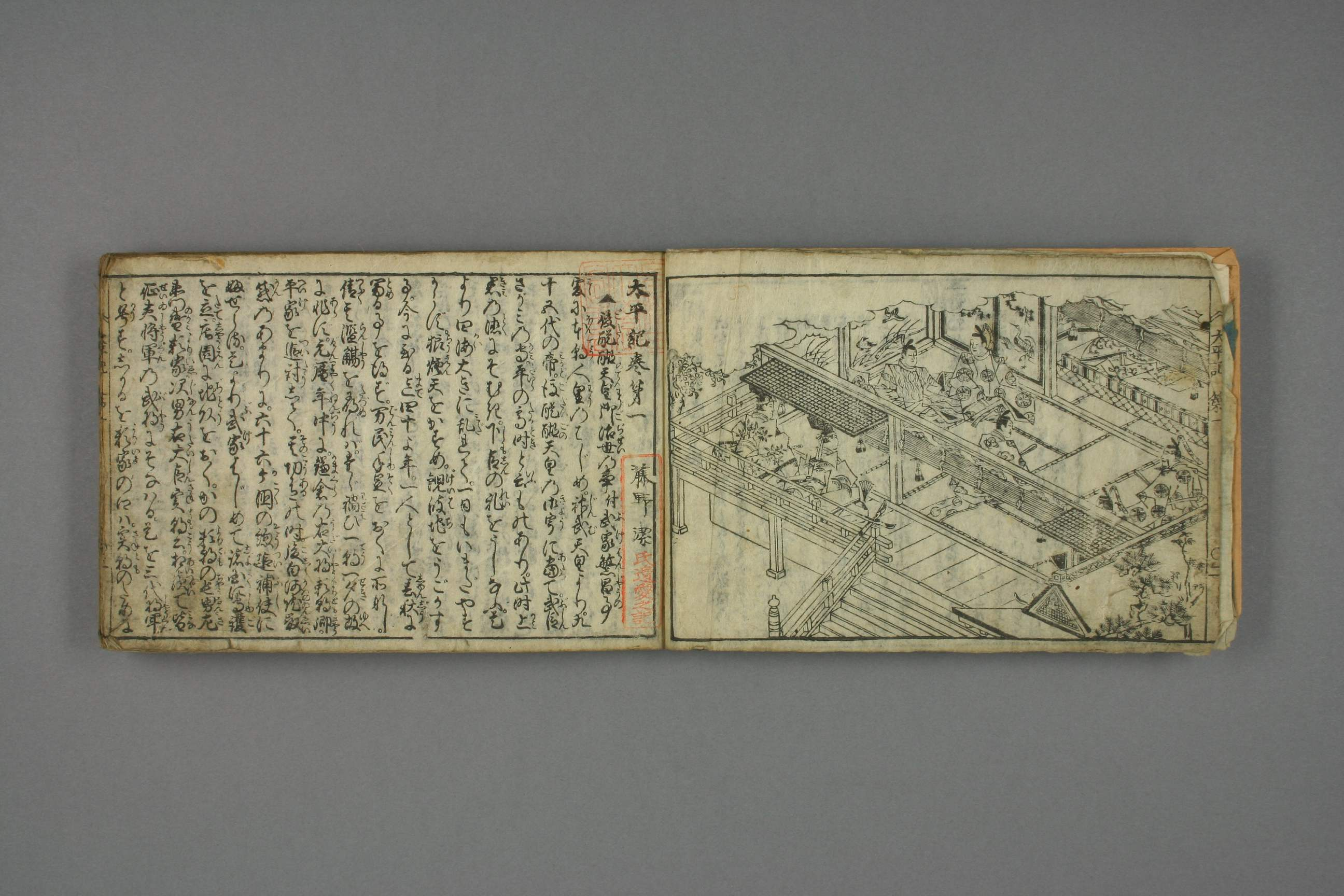
Taiheiki

The Taiheiki (太平記, literally "Chronicle of Great Peace") is a medieval Japanese historical epic (see gunki monogatari) written in the late 14th century and covers the period from 1319 to 1367. It deals primarily with the Nanboku-chō, the period of war between the Northern Court of Ashikaga Takauji in Kyoto, and the Southern Court of Emperor Go-Daigo in Yoshino.

== Original work ==
The latest English translation consists of 12 chapters of the 40-chapter epic, and spans the period from Go-Daigo's accession in 1318 (when Takauji was still a minor vassal of the Kamakura shogunate's Hōjō clan), through Takauji's betrayal of the Hōjō, and Go-Daigo's fall and expulsion by Takauji in 1333, to his return to Kyoto in 1338. Go-Daigo, unlike many of the emperors before and after him, sought to supersede the power of the shōguns, and to actually rule in addition to reigning in name. Thus began a series of battles, both military and political, as the Fujiwara family, who dominated the Imperial regency following the fall of the Hōjō, sought to retain influence. These battles, political maneuvers, and other developments of the time are related in the Taiheiki.

== Historical significance ==
These battles are historically very important as they led to the extinction of the Southern Court of the Japanese Imperial Line, which to this day is seen as legitimate. Northern Court members may be considered pretenders, but the ramifications are relics of history. One Southern Court descendant, Kumazawa Hiromichi, proclaimed himself Japan's Emperor after World War II, calling Emperor Hirohito a fraud, as Hirohito's entire line is descended from the Northern Court. Despite this, he was not arrested for lèse-majesté, even when donning the Imperial Crest, because he had a koseki detailing his bloodline back to Go-Daigo in Yoshino. Kumazawa has been unsuccessful at creating any political change other than some sympathy.

== Analysis ==
Like most Japanese historical epics, the Taiheiki's tendencies towards drama and exaggeration are acknowledged, but the text is regarded as remaining mostly accurate. It is the primary and first-hand source on many of the warriors and battles of this period, and also documents elements of the fall of the powerful and historically important Hōjō clan.

== Cultural references ==
A line said by the pro-imperial samurai Kusunoki Masashige (regarding how "he wished that he would be reborn seven times to fight for the emperor" in an improved way) in the Taiheiki became well known among Japanese nationalists and pro-imperialist in the 19th and 20th centuries and the legends about him became an ideal for them to follow.

NHK's 1991 taiga drama Taiheiki was noted for its portrayal of Ashikaga Takauji as an agent of change against the decadent Hōjō, rather than a national traitor as generally viewed by Japanese historians.

== See also ==
- Japanese Historical Text Initiative
- Shin'yō Wakashū, Nanboku-chō period collection of waka
