= Kitabatake =

Kitabatake (written: 北畠 lit. "north terraced field") is a Japanese surname. Notable people with the surname include:

- Kitabatake Akiie (北畠 顕家, 1318–1338), Japanese kuge
- Kitabatake Akinobu (北畠 顕信, 1320–1380), Japanese court noble
- Kitabatake Akiyoshi (北畠 顕能, 1326–1383), Japanese warlord
- Kitabatake Chikafusa (北畠 親房, 1293 –1354), Japanese kuge and writer
- Kitabatake Morichika (北畠 守親), Japanese court noble
- Kitabatake Tomonori (北畠 具教, 1528–1576), Japanese lord
- Kitabatake Tomoyuki (北畠 具行, 1290–1332), Japanese court noble
- Sayoko Kitabatake (北畠 紗代子, born 1978), Japanese archer
- Yao Kitabatake (北畠 八穂, 1903–1982), Japanese poet and writer

== See also ==
- Kitabatake clan, a Japanese samurai clan, active from the 13th to the 17th centuries
  - Kitabatake Shrine, a shrine in Tsu, Japan, dedicated to this clan
