= Azaka Castle =

- 阿坂城
- Matsusaka, Mie, Japan
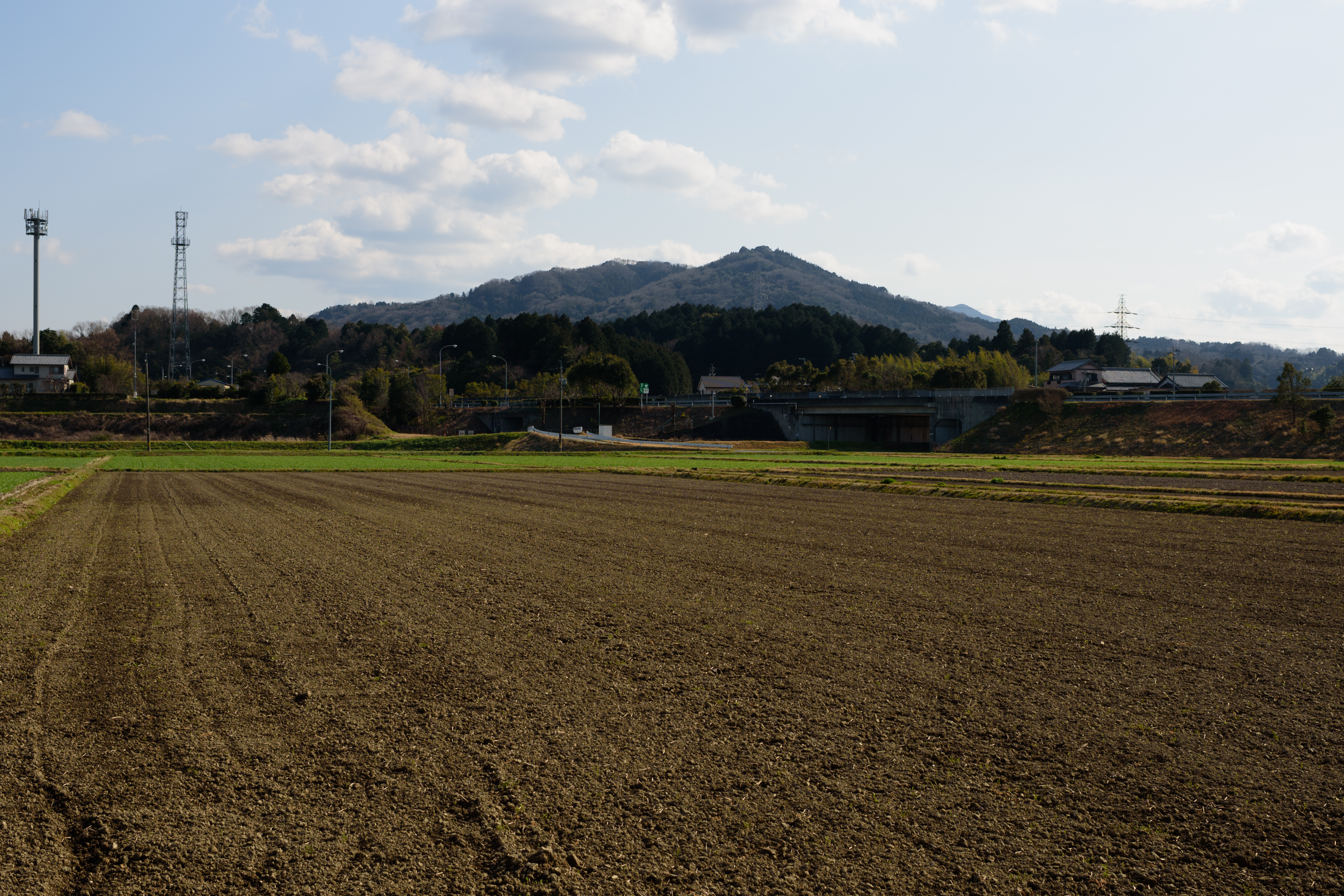
- Mount Azaka, location of Azaka Castle

Site information
- Type: yamashiro-style Japanese castle
- Open to the public: Yes
- Condition: ruins

Location
- Azaka Castle Azaka Castle (Japan)
- Coordinates: 34°35′43″N 136°27′16″E

Site history
- Built: c.1335
- Built by: Kitabatake Chikafusa
- In use: Nanboku-cho through Sengoku period
- Demolished: 1567

Azaka Castle (阿坂城, Azaka-jō) was a Japanese castle located in what is now the Oazaka neighborhood of the city of Matsusaka, Mie in the Kansai region of Japan. Its ruins were designated a National Historic Site in 1982, collectively with the ruins of Taka Castle and Karatachi Castle. All of these fortifications were important citadels of the Kitabatake clan who controlled northern Ise Province in the Nanboku-chō period.

== Overview ==
Azaka Castle is located on a 312-meter mountain overlooking Ise Bay with the mountains of Mikawa Province in the distance, and is within the borders of the Ise-Shima National Park. The ruins are spread over a range of 180 meters east-to-west by 330 meters north-to-south. The name “Azaka Castle” is actually a misnomer, as the castle consists of a pair of fortifications separated by 250 meters. The southern portion is also known independently as Hakumai-jō (白米城) and the northern portion as Shiinogi Castle (椎之木城). The Taka Castle and Karatachi Castle mentioned in the National Historic Site designation were smaller detached fortifications built by the Omiya clan, vassals of the Kitabatake, in the early Sengoku period.

== Structure ==
Shiinogi Castle is the larger and newer of the two portions of Azaka Castle and is considered the main fortification due to its complicated array of earthworks and dry moats. It is centered on two narrow plateaus, with a moat in between at both ends. There are also two vertical moats on the lower west slope on the north side. The Hakumai Castle portion of the fortification is higher in elevation and can be seen from the city of Matsusaka. The base enclosure is a 45m x 60m trapezoid, and the upper enclosure is a 20m x 35m flat oval with small trapezoids at the four corners.

== History ==
The castle was constructed shortly after Kitabatake Chikafusa entered Ise Province in 1335 with his three sons, Akiie, Akinobu and Akiyoshi. The Kitabatake were strong supporters of the Southern Court and had been ordered by Emperor Go-Daigo to wrest Ise Province from the Toki clan, who supported the rival Northern Court. In 1415, Kitabatake Mitsumasa raised an army at this location composed of loyalists from Kii, Yamato and Kawachi Provinces when the coronation of Emperor Shōkō was opposed by the Ashikaga shogunate and withstood a siege by an army led by the Isshiki Yoshitsura.

The castle briefly disappears from history, and resurfaces again in 1567, when its castellan, Oyama Yoshiyuki repelled repeated attacks by Oda Nobunaga's general Takigawa Kazumasu. The castle finally fell due to ruse by Toyotomi Hideyoshi in 1567; however, Hideyoshi was wounded in the thigh by an arrow fired by Omiya Yoshiyuki, which is said to have been the only combat wound which he received in his long military career.

== Current situation ==
There are very few physical remnants of the castle remaining today, aside from fragments of earthenworks and dry moats. A monument is located on the southern end of the castle enclosure. The castle ruins can be reached by a one-hour hike from the Iwakuraguchi bus stop on Mie Kotsu Bus No. 48 from Matsusaka Station on the JR West Kisei Main Line.

== See also ==
- List of Historic Sites of Japan (Mie)
