= List of the Fifteen Shrines of the Kenmu Restoration =

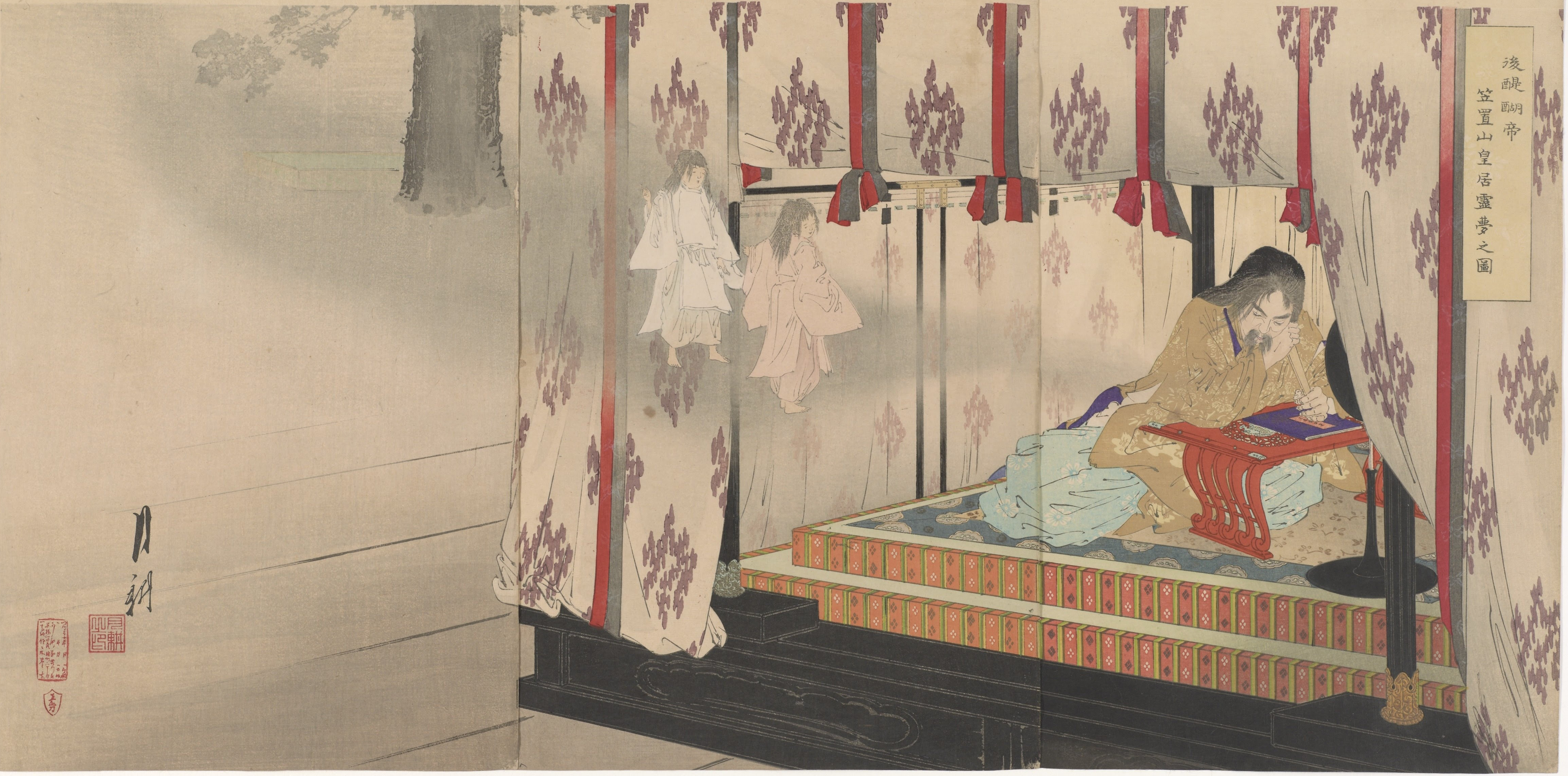
Emperor Godaigo

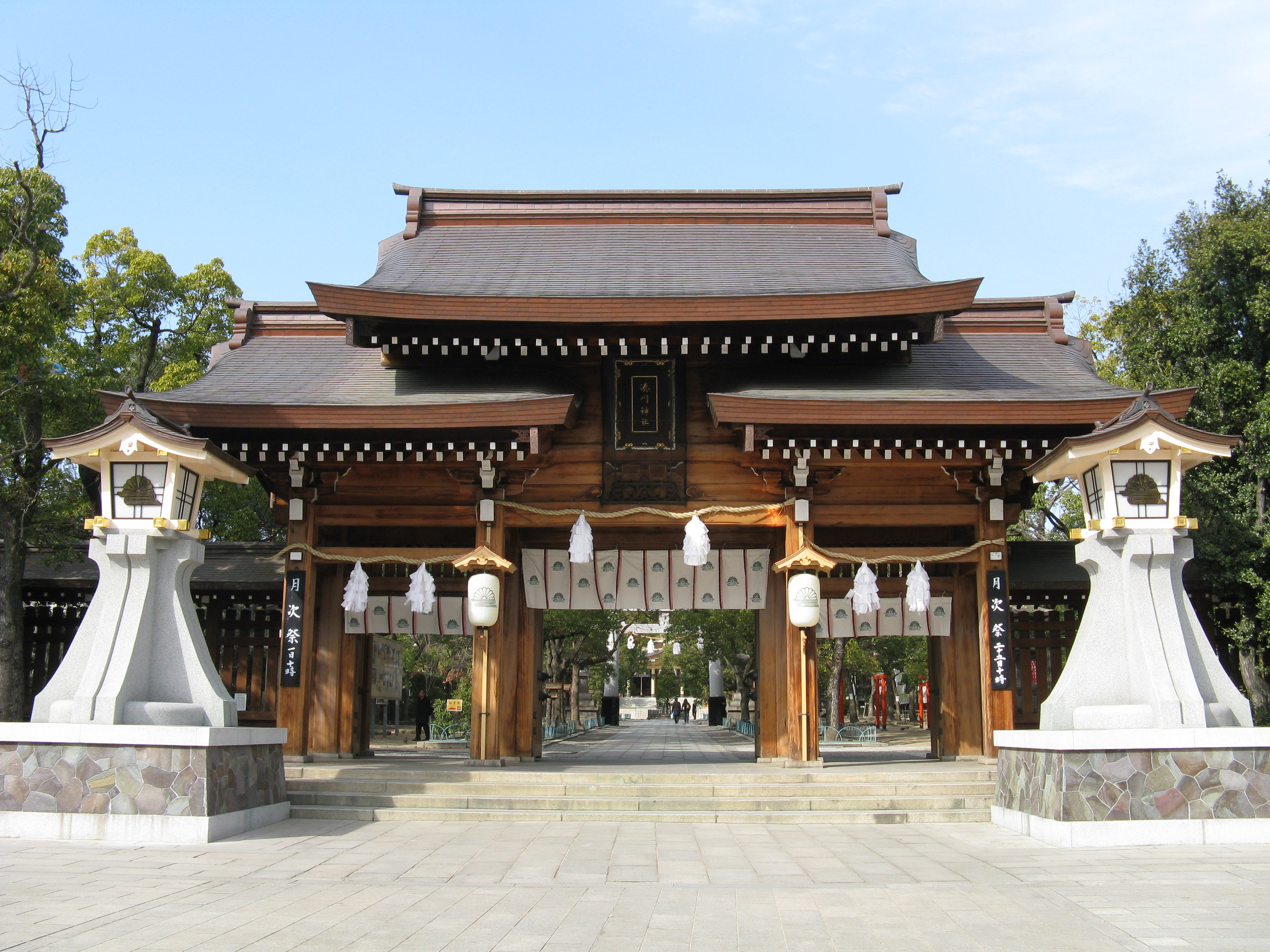
Minatogawa Shrine

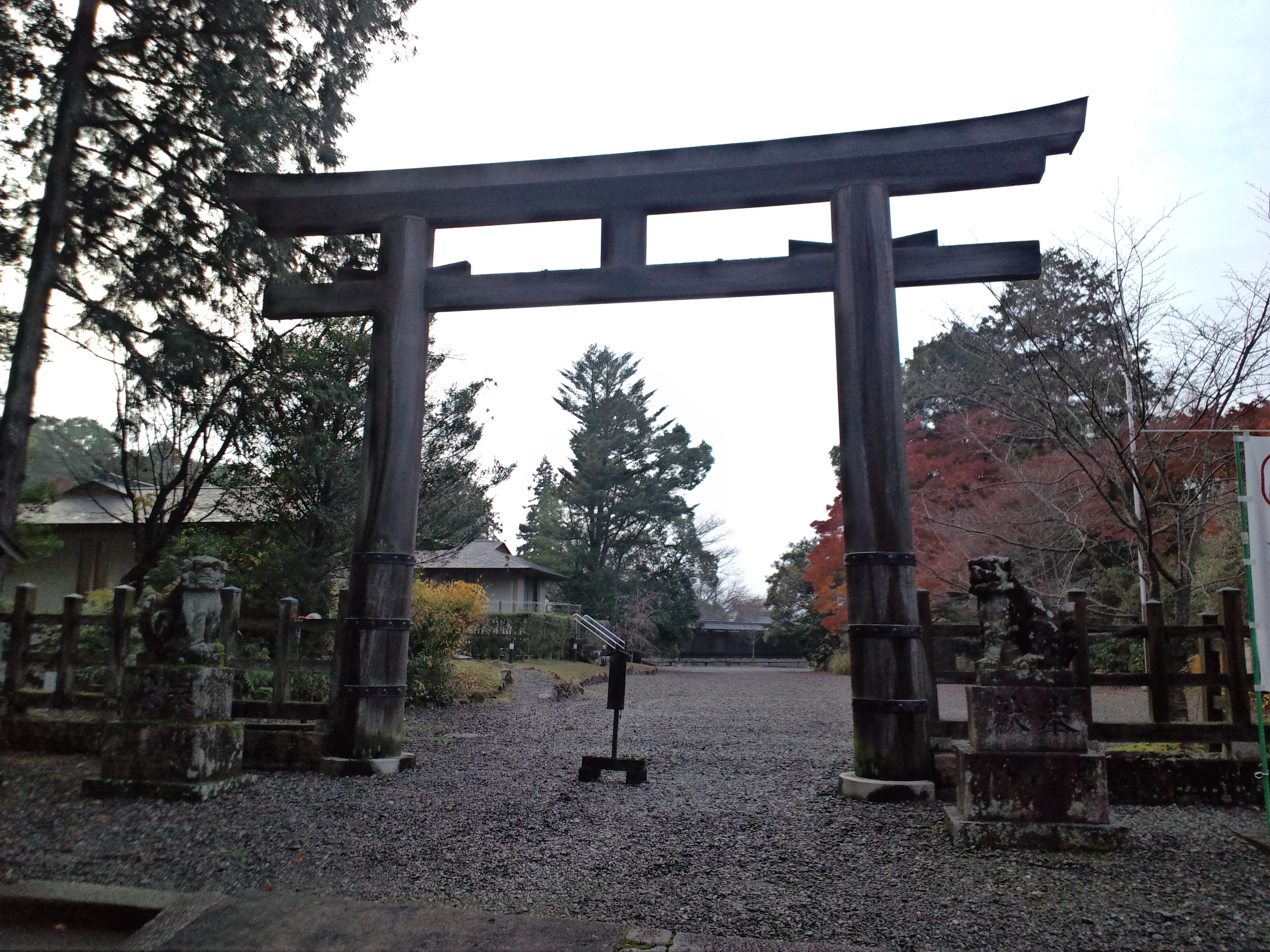
Yoshino Shrine Torii gate

The Fifteen Shrines of the Kenmu Restoration (建武中興十五社, Kenmu chūko jūgosha) are a group of Shinto shrines dedicated to individuals and events of the Kenmu Restoration.

Shrine Name	Commemoration	Place
Yoshino Shrine	Emperor Go-Daigo	Yoshino District, Nara
Kamakura-gū	Prince Moriyoshi	Kamakura
Iinoya-gū	Munenaga	Hamamatsu, Shizuoka Prefecture
Yatsushiro-gū	Prince Kaneyoshi	Yatsushiro, Kumamoto Prefecture
Kanegasaki-gū	Prince Takanaga, Prince Tsunenaga	Tsuruga, Fukui Prefecture
Komikado Shrine	Kazan'in Morokata	Narita, Chiba Prefecture
Kikuchi Shrine	Kikuchi Taketoki	Kikuchi, Kumamoto Prefecture
Minatogawa Shrine	Kusunoki Masashige	Chūō-ku, Kobe
Nawa Shrine	Nawa Nagatoshi	Daisen, Tottori Prefecture
Abeno Shrine	Kitabatake Chikafusa, Kitabatake Akiie	Abeno-ku, Osaka Prefecture
Fujishima Shrine	Nitta Yoshisada	Fukui, Fukui Prefecture
Yūki Shrine	Yūki Munehiro	Tsu, Mie Prefecture
Ryōzen Shrine	Kitabatake Chikafusa, Kitabatake Akiie, Kitabatake Akinobu, Kitabatake Morichika	Date, Fukushima Prefecture
Shijōnawate Shrine	Kusunoki Masatsura	Shijōnawate, Osaka Prefecture
Kitabatake Shrine	Kitabatake Akiyoshi	Tsu, Mie Prefecture
