= Kiriyama Castle =

- 霧山城
- Tsu, Mie Prefecture, Japan
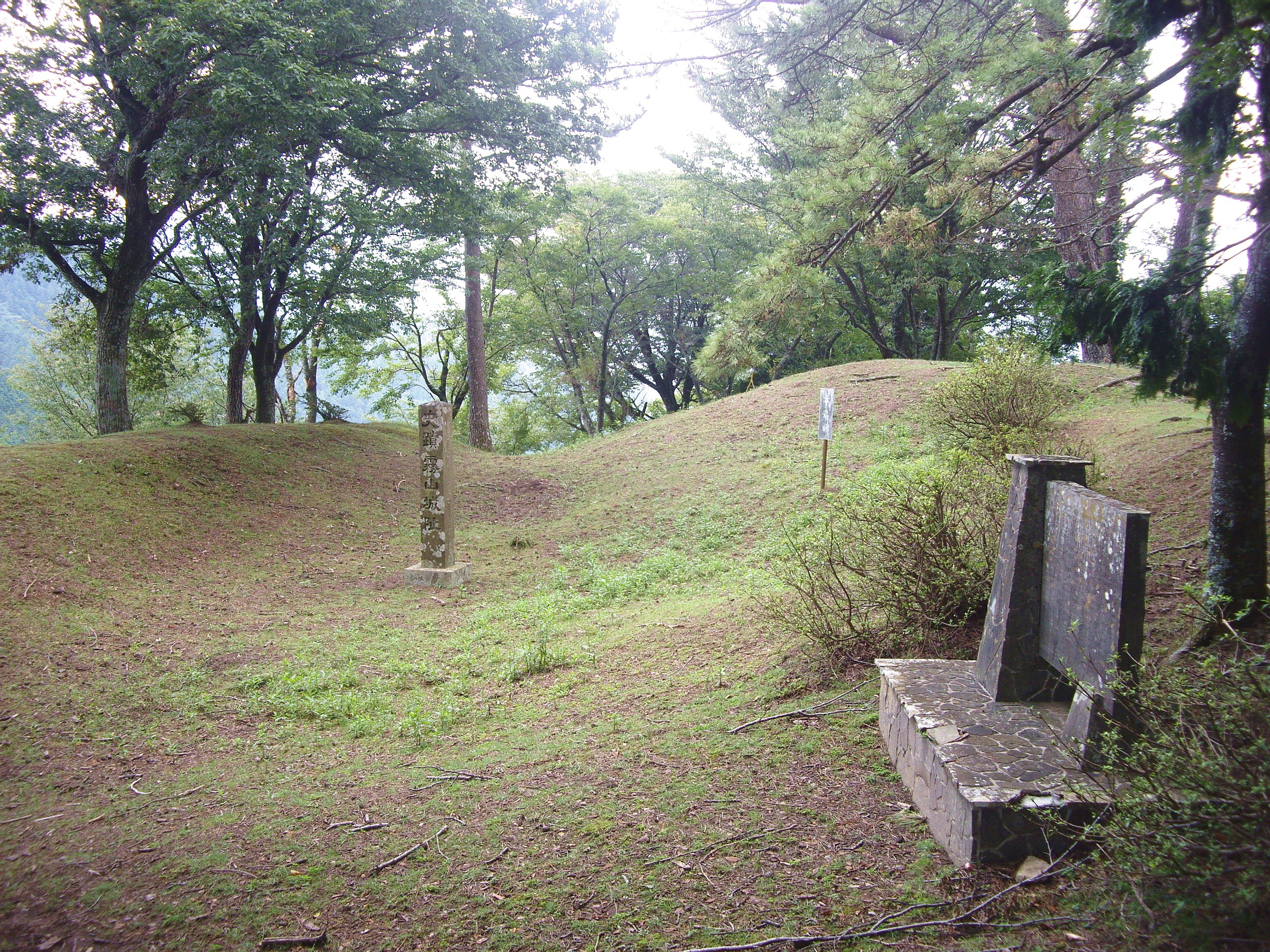
- Kiriyama Castle

Site information
- Type: yamashiro-style Japanese castle
- Open to the public: yes (no public facilities)
- Condition: ruins

Location
- Kiriyama Castle Kiriyama Castle (Japan)
- Coordinates: 34°31′23.5″N 136°17′21.7″E

Site history
- Built: Muromachi period
- Built by: Kitabatake clan
- In use: Nanboku-chō to Sengoku period
- Demolished: 1576

Kiriyama Castle (霧山城, Kiriyama jō) was a yamashiro-style Muromachi period Japanese castle located in the Misugi neighborhood the city of Tsu, Mie Prefecture, in the Kansai region of Japan. Its ruins have been protected as a National Historic Site since 1934. The castle is also known as Tage Castle (多気城, Tage jō).

== Overview ==
The Kitabatake clan was a cadet branch of the Minamoto clan and served closely with the Southern Court during the wars of the Nanboku-chō period, changing their fealty later to the Ashikaga shogunate. The clan ruled as kokushi of Ise Province to the end of the Sengoku period. They chose the mountainous Tage area which connected Yamato Province with the Ise Plain to be their stronghold, as it was transportation hub that was close to both Kyoto and the ocean, and was surrounded by natural fortifications. The Kitabatake constructed a fortified residence (yakata) on a site that was protected by rivers to the east, south and north, with a steep slope to the west extending to their main redoubt in the mountains. This redoubt was Kiriyama Castle. The residence and the castle were surrounded by a castle town which had around 3500 buildings and in which lived some 700 to 1000 vassals. The complex was considered impregnable for some 240 years until it was attacked and destroyed by Oda Nobunaga in 1576.

Kiriyama Castle was constructed on two mountain ridges at an elevation of 560 meters (240 meters above Tage Plain) and 1.1 kilometers from the Tage Yakata. Both the northeastern and southwestern ridges were about 120 meters in length and 30 meters in width, and were protected by earthworks and dry moats. As the southwestern ridge is higher in elevation, it is considered the core of the castle, and also contained a bell tower. As was typical of Japanese mountain castle construction during this period, both ridges were surrounded by a system of kuruwa smaller enclosures.

The castle was constructed by Kitabatake Akiyoshi in 1342. The Kitabatake clan had suffered a series of defeats in southern Ise Province in which their flatland castles were taken one after another, and Kitabatake Akiyoshi wanted a mountain stronghold capable of withstanding a long battle. Following the defeat of the Southern Court at the 1348 Battle of Shijōnawate, Kitabatake Akiyoshi sortied 500 cavalry from Kiriyama Castle, driving Ashikaga forces out of Yoshino. Kitabatake Akiyoshi died at the Tage Yakata in 1383. In 1392, the Meitoki Treaty theoretically brought the conflict between the Northern and Southern Courts to an end. However, the coronation of Emperor Shōkō in 1415 reignited the conflict. Kitabatake Mitsumasa gave shelter to rebel Prince Ogura at Kiriyama Castle from 1428 to 1429. Afterwards, the Kitabatake clan reached an accord with the Ashikaga shogunate, and in April 1484, the Shogun Ashikaga Yoshihisa stayed at Kiriyama Castle on a pilgrimage to the Ise Grand Shrine. The castle is recorded to have been destroyed by fire in 1499 but was rebuilt by 1506. In July 1522, the renga poet Socho stayed for a few days at the castle and wrote a number of poems about it.

When Oda Nobunaga invaded northern Ise Province in 1569, Kitabatake Tomonori relocated his seat to Okawachi Castle, which was his second most important fortification after Kiriyama Castle. After a number of largely inconclusive battles, the Oda and Kitabatake reached an agreement to end the conflict through a marriage alliance whereby Kitabatake Tomofusa would adopt Nobunaga's son Oda Nobukatsu in 1570. In 1575, Nobukatsu deposed and killed his father-in-law and completely took over the Kitabatake clan. His forces attacked and destroyed the Tage Yakata in 1576, and despite a desperate last struggle by the surviving Kitabatake, Kiriyama Castle was taken and destroyed shortly afterwards.

== Current situation ==
The castle ruins were designated as a National Historic Site in 1936. In 2006, it was merged with the Tage Yakata ruins and garden remnants under the name "Tage Kitabatakeshi Jōkan ato" (Tage Kitabatake clan fortified residences sites). The total area after the integration and addition was 268,906.91square meters. The Tsu City Board of Education has been excavating the ruins of the castle in 2006.

In 2017, the Kitabatakeshi Jōkan was listed as one of the Continued Top 100 Japanese Castles in 2017.

== See also ==
- List of Historic Sites of Japan (Mie)
