= Ryōzen Shrine =

Shinto shrine in Japan

Ryōzen jinja 霊山神社
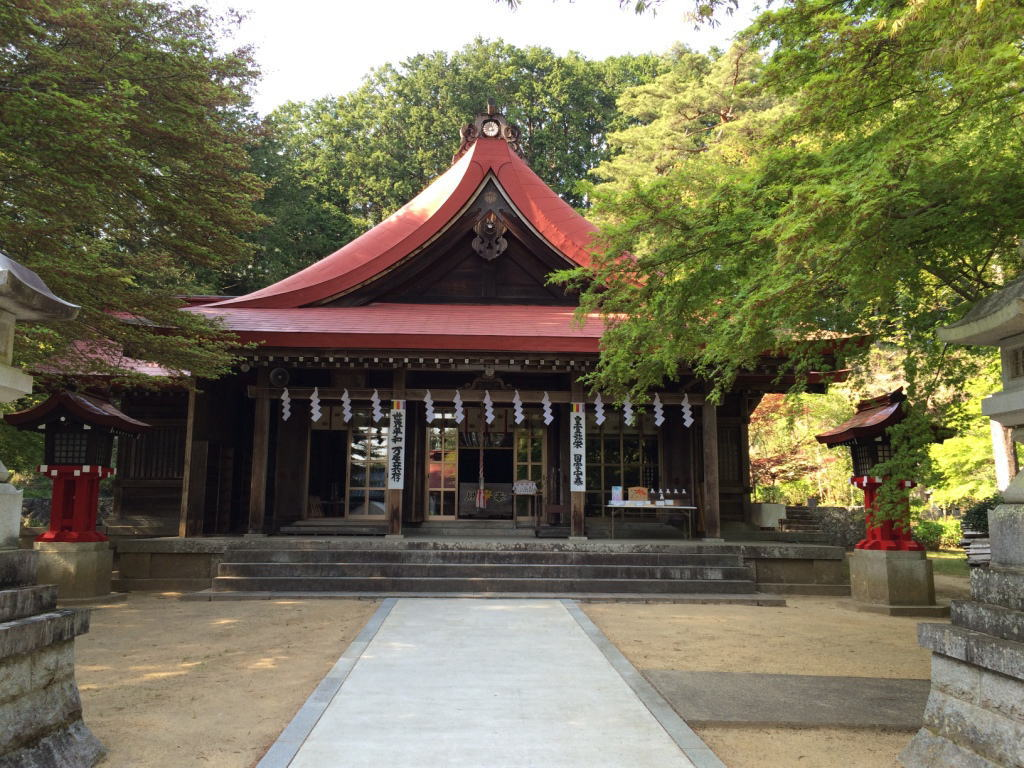
- The haiden of Ryōzen jinja

- Location within Fukushima Prefecture Location within Japan

Religion
- Affiliation: Shinto
- Deity: Kitabatake clan

Location
- Location: Date, Fukushima
- Coordinates: 37°47′56″N 140°38′47″E

Architecture
- Established: 1881

Ryōzen Shrine (霊山神社, Ryōzen Jinja) is a Shinto shrine located on Mount Ryōzen in the former town of Ryozen, within the city of Date, Fukushima Prefecture, Japan. Its main festivals are held annually on April 22 and October 10.

The shrine was founded in 1881, and enshrines the kami of Kitabatake Chikafusa, Kitabatake Akiie, Kitabatake Akinobu, and Kitabatake Morichika. It is one of the Fifteen Shrines of the Kenmu Restoration.

== Access ==
The shrine is 35 minutes from Fukushima Station or 16 minutes from the Abukuma Express Line's Hobara Station by car.

== See also ==
- Fifteen Shrines of the Kenmu Restoration
