= Yūki Shrine =

Shinto shrine in Mie Prefecture, Japan

Yūki Shrine 結城神社
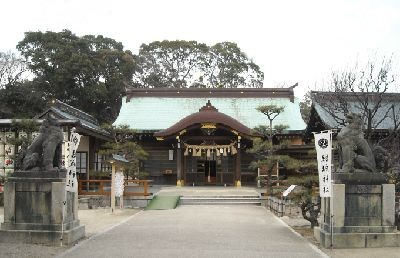
- Heiden of Yūki Shrine

- Yūki Jinja Yūki Shrine (Japan)

Religion
- Affiliation: Shinto
- Deity: Yūki Munehiro
- Festival: May 1–3
- Type: Fifteen Shrines of the Kenmu Restoration

Location
- Location: 2341 Fujikata, Tsu City, Mie Prefecture
- Coordinates: 34°41′52″N 136°30′55″E

Architecture
- Established: 1824, restored 1879

Yūki Shrine (結城神社, Yūki jinja) is a Shinto shrine located in the city of Tsu, Mie Prefecture, Japan. Its main festival is held annually on May 1, 2 and 3. It is one of the Fifteen Shrines of the Kenmu Restoration.

== History ==
Yūki Munehiro (1266 – 1339) was a vassal of the Kamakura shogunate who had been entrusted with southern Mutsu Province and was castellan of Shirakawa Castle He was dispatched by Hōjō Takatoki to Kyoto in 1331 during the Genkō War, but subsequently defected to the side of Emperor Go-Daigo. He returned as one of Nitta Yoshisada's generals during the 1333 Battle of Kamakura to overthrow the Hōjō. Following the Kenmu Restoration, he served alongside Kusunoki Masashige as an aide to Emperor Go-Daigo and assisted Kitabatake Akiie conquer Mutsu Province. When Ashikaga Takauji rebelled against Emperor Go-Daigo, he led the army which retook Kyoto from the Ashikaga in 1336 and was awarded a sword from the emperor. However, in 1338 Ashikaga Takauji retook Kyoto, and Yūki Munehiro was forced to flee to Yoshino, Nara where Emperor Go-Daigo had established the Southern Court. He subsequently crossed into Ise Province and attempted to take a boat back to Mutsu to rally his forces against the Ashikaga, but was shipwrecked and died. In 1824, Tōdō Takasawa, the daimyō of Tsu Domain erected a small shrine on the site of his grave.

Following the Meiji Restoration and the establishment of State Shinto, the Meiji government wished to sponsor patriotism by recalling the events and people of the previous Kenmu Restoration. Yūki Shrine was given the official status of a village shrine in 1879 under the Modern system of ranked Shinto shrines. Emperor Meiji visited Mie Prefecture the following year and made an offering of 200 Yen to the shrine. The shrine was promoted to special status in 1882 as one of the "Fifteen Shrines of the Kenmu Restoration".

The shrine was burned down in July 1945 during World War II, and was reconstructed in the late 1950s. It is located approximately one kilometer southeast of Akogi Station on the Kisei Main Line.

== See also ==
- Fifteen Shrines of the Kenmu Restoration
