= Iinoya-gū =

Shinto shrine in Hamana-ku, Hamamatsu, Shizuoka Prefecture, Japan

Iinoya-gū 井伊谷宮
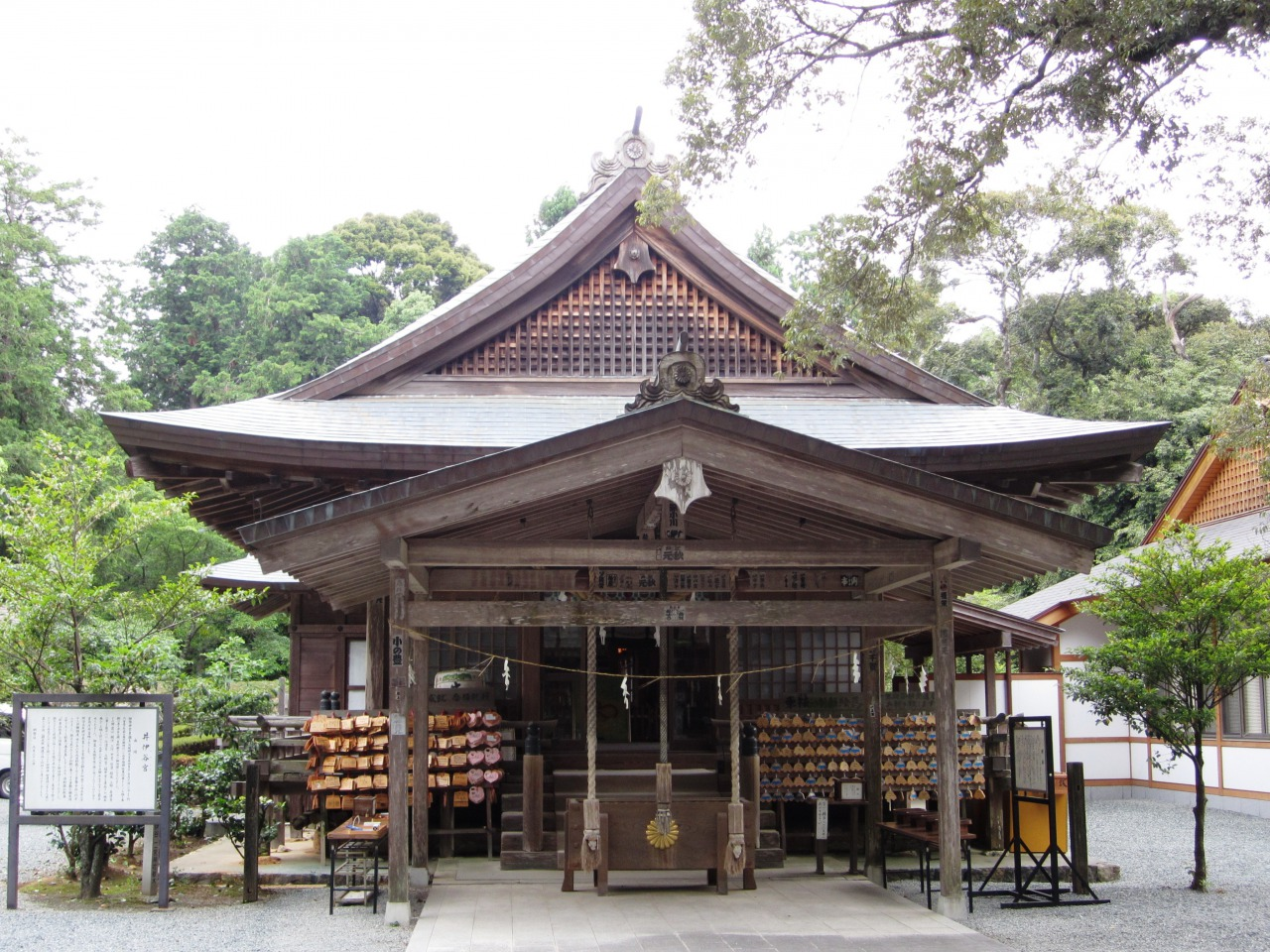
- Iinoya-gū in Hamamatsu, Shizuoka.

- Location within Shizuoka Prefecture Location within Japan

Religion
- Affiliation: Shinto
- Deity: Prince Munenaga
- Festival: September 22

Location
- Location: Hamana-ku, Hamamatsu Shizuoka Prefecture, Japan
- Interactive map of Iinoya-gū 井伊谷宮
- Coordinates: 34.8292°N 137.6679°E

Architecture
- Founder: Meiji government
- Established: 1872

Website
- iinoyaguu.ehoh.net

Iinoya-gū (井伊谷宮, Iinoya-gū) is a Shinto shrine in Hamana-ku, Hamamatsu, Shizuoka Prefecture, Japan. It was established in 1872, and its main festival is held annually on September 22. It is one of the Fifteen Shrines of the Kenmu Restoration.

== History ==
Iinoya-gū is dedicated to the deified spirit of Prince Munenaga, the fourth son of Emperor Go-Daigo, who died on this location in 1385. Munenaga was appointed as Shogun by his father, and fought on behalf of the Southern Court against Ashikaga Takauji. Long after the establishment of the Muromachi shogunate and Munenaga refused to accept defeat and continued his resistance in the mountains of Tōtōmi and Shinano Provinces until his death.

Following the Meiji restoration, the new Meiji government wished to propagate a sense of loyalty to the Imperial family of Japan and to emphasize the legitimacy of the Southern Court. The former daimyō of Hikone Domain, Ii Naonori brought the site of Prince Munenaga's grave to the attention of the authorities. The grave was located in Ii-no-ya valley, which also happened to be the ancestral home of the Ii clan. Construction on a shrine began in 1870 and the building was completed in 1872.

In 1873, the shrine was given the rank of (官幣中社, kanpei-chūsha), or imperial shrine of the second rank, in the Modern system of ranked Shinto Shrines under State Shinto.

== See also ==
- Fifteen Shrines of the Kenmu Restoration
- Kamakura-gu
