= Kitabatake Shrine =

Shrine in Mie Prefecture, Japan

Kitabatake Jinja 北畠神社
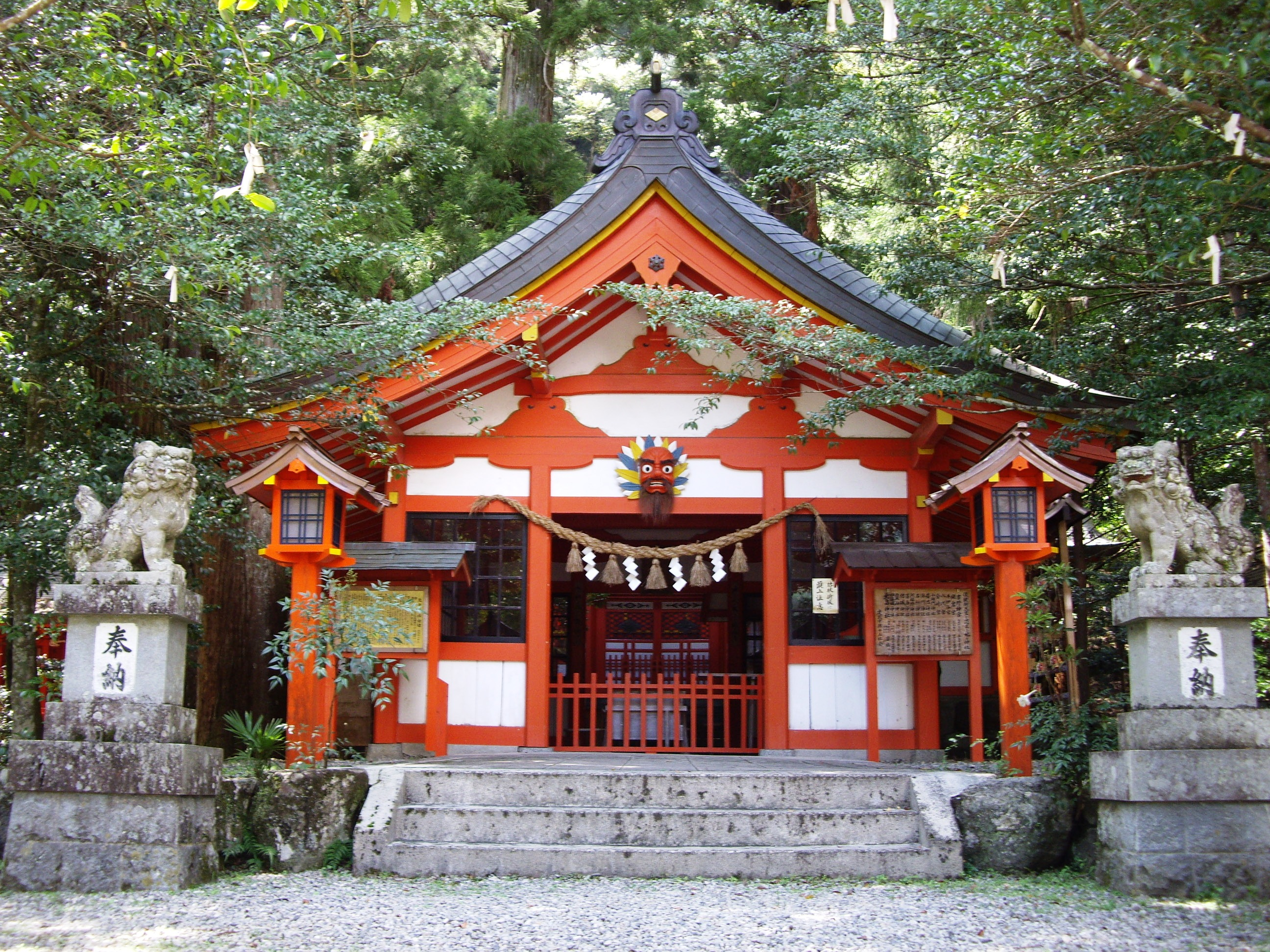
- Kitabatake Jinja

- Location within Mie Prefecture Location within Japan

Religion
- Affiliation: Shinto
- Deity: Kitabatake Akiyoshi
- Festival: October 13

Location
- Location: Tsu-shi, Mie-ken
- Interactive map of Kitabatake Jinja 北畠神社
- Coordinates: 34°31′07″N 136°17′56″E

Architecture
- Established: 1643

Kitabatake Shrine (北畠神社, Kitabatake Jinja) is a Shinto shrine located in the Misugi neighborhood of the city of Tsu, Mie Prefecture, Japan. It is one of the Fifteen Shrines of the Kenmu Restoration. The main kami enshrined is the deified spirit of the imperial loyalist Kitabatake Akiyoshi and other members of the Kitabatake clan. The shrine's main festival is held annually on October 13.

== History ==
The shrine is located on the site of the Kitabatakeshi Yakata, a fortified residence of the Tage Kitabatake clan during the Nanboku-chō period. Kitabatake Tomofusa's 4th grandson Suzuki Sonbei Ieji built a small Hachiman shrine on this site in 1643. Following the Meiji restoration, the new Meiji government sought out sites connected with the earlier Kenmu restoration and established a number of Shinto shrines on these locations, both to emphasize the legitimacy of the new regime and to spread the doctrine of State Shinto. This small Hachiman shrine was rebuilt in November 1881 as the Kitabatake Shrine, and Hachiman was displaced by the deified spirits of Kitabatake Akiyoshi, together with Kitabatake Chikafusa and Kitabatake Akiie. In 1907, 16 small shrines from various locations in Tage village were merged into the Kitabatake Shrine, and in 1928 the shrine buildings were reconstructed. The shrine was given then official rank of Bekkaku kanpeisha (別格官幣社) under the pre-World War II Modern system of ranked Shinto Shrines. The shrine Is located about ten minutes by car from the Hitsu Station on the JR Central Meishō Line.

== Tage Kitabatakeshi Yakata (Tage Kitabatake clan fortified residence) ==
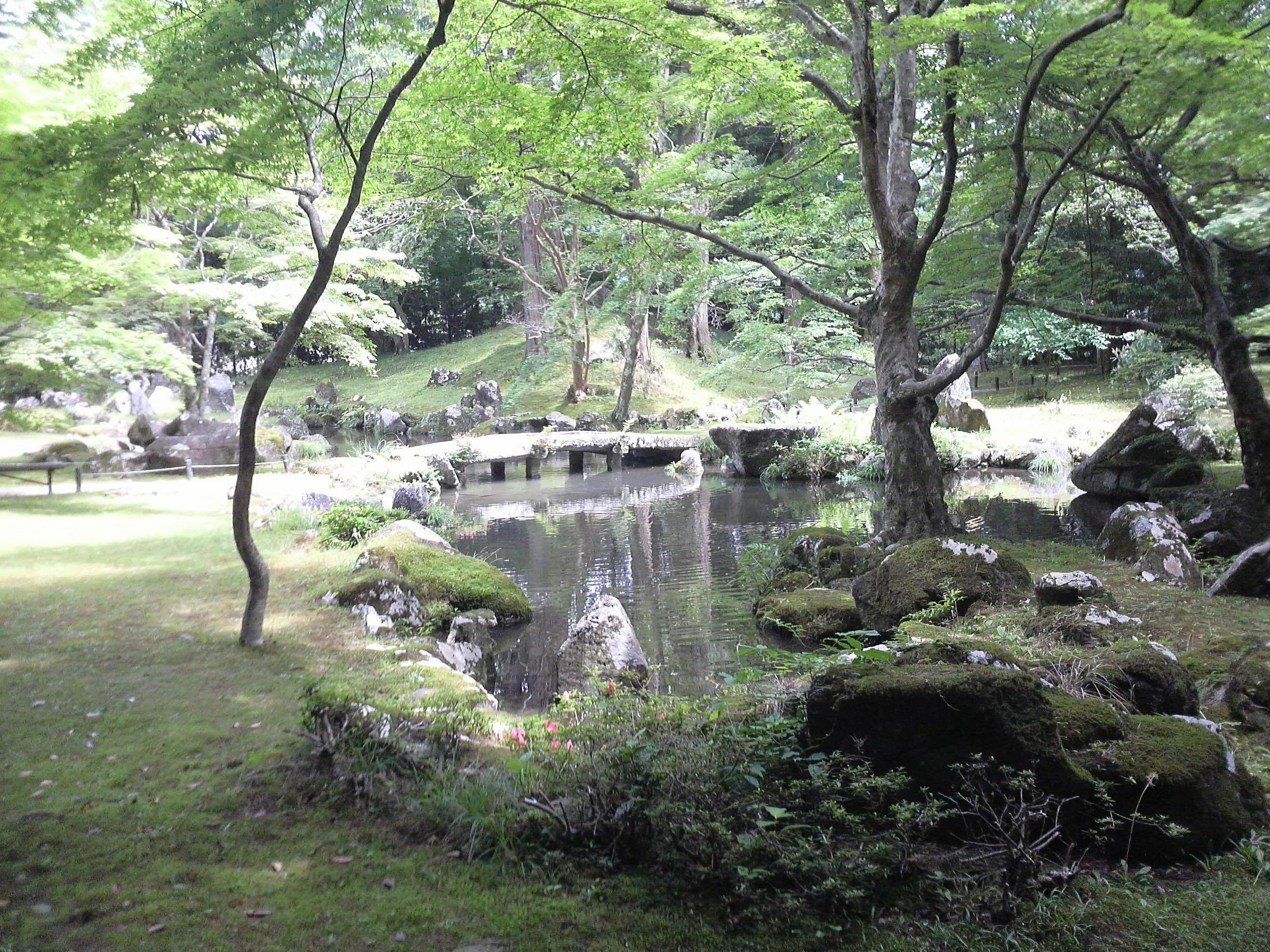
Kitabatake Jōkan garden

The Kitabatake clan was a cadet branch of the Minamoto clan and served closely with the Southern Court during the wars of the Nanboku-chō period, later reaching an accord with the Ashikaga shogunate. The clan ruled as kokushi of Ise Province to the end of the Sengoku period. They chose the mountainous Tage area which connected Yamato Province with the Ise Plain to be their stronghold and constructed a fortified residence (yakata) on a site that was protected by rivers to the east, south and north, with a steep slope to the west extending to their main redoubt in the mountains, Kiriyama Castle. The residence site is roughly trapezoidal, measuring 200 meters from north-to-south and 110 meters from east-to-west. The northern portion of the site is now occupied by the Kitabatake Shrine.

The residence was used until Kitabatake Tomonori (1528–1576) relocated his seat to Okawachi Castle. However, the gardens which were made for the residence have survived.

In 1936, the ruins of Kiriyama Castle were designated as a National Historic Site, together with the ruins of the Kitabatakeshi Yakata gardens, which were also designated as a National Scenic Site. The site of the residence was excavated in 1996, during which time the remains of many buildings from the first half of the 15th century were discovered, along with ceramic shards from China and from many parts of Japan, fragments of armor, and of Buddhist statues and ritual items. In 2006, the National Historic Site designation was expanded to cover the entire Kitabatakeshi Yakata site, including the gardens, Kiriyama Castle and the area connecting the two zones under the name of "Tage Kitabatakeshi Jōkan ato" (Tage Kitabatake clan fortified residences sites). The total area after the integration and addition was 268,906.91square meters.

In 2017, the Kitabatakeshi Jōkan was listed as one of the Continued Top 100 Japanese Castles in 2017.

== See also ==
- List of Historic Sites of Japan (Mie)
- Fifteen Shrines of the Kenmu Restoration
- List of Shinto shrines
