= Yūki Munehiro =

Japanese bushi (1266–1339)

Yūki Munehiro (結城宗広) (1266 – January 1, 1339)

He was a Kamakura Period military figure who defended the Southern Court during the Nanboku-chō period.

He is enshrined at Yūki Shrine in Tsu, Mie Prefecture.

His son however, Yūki Chikatomo, remained neutral, preventing Chikafusa from advancing north at Shirakawa. By July 1342, Chikatomo has allied himself with Takauji.
