= Kōun =

Japanese poet (d. 1429)

Kazan'in Nagachika (花山院長親), also known as Fujiwara no Nagachika (藤原長親) and by his art name Kōun (耕雲), was a Japanese waka poet of the Nanbokuchō period and early Muromachi period. His Dharma name was Myōgi (明魏).

== Biography ==
Kazan'in Nagachika's year of birth is unknown. He was the son of Kazan'in Iekata and the grandson of Kazan'in Morokata. He followed his father and grandfather in serving the emperors of the Southern Court.

In 1384 he is supposed to have left the Southern Court capital of Yoshino and gone wandering. His own account in the Kōun Kuden (which he wrote in 1408) indicates that around 1394 he took up residence in Kyoto.

According to the postscript to the Kōun Senshu, by the first month of Genchū 6 (1389) he had risen to the rank of Naidaijin, but before this time he had already left court. Shortly after this date he entered Buddhist orders.

He died in seventh month of Shōchō 2 (1429). A poem of his dating to 1414 appears to give his age as around 70, meaning he was probably in his eighties at the time of his death.

== Names ==
Kazan'in Nagachika was a member of the Fujiwara clan, and so is also known as Fujiwara no Nagachika. His art name was Kōun, and his Dharma name upon entering Buddhist orders was Myōgi.

== Poetry ==
Nagachika's participation in the Dairi Sanbyaku-rokujisshu Uta (内裏三百六十首歌) in 1365 was his first significant achievement as a waka poet. He went on to participate in numerous poetry contests and gatherings at court, including: the Nanchō Sanbyaku-ban Uta-awase (南朝三百番歌合, 1371); the Nanchō Gohyaku-ban Uta-awase (南朝五百番歌合, 1375); the Sumiyoshi-sha Sanbyaku-rokujū-ban Uta-awase (住吉社三百六十番歌合, 1375); and the Nanchō Dairi Senshu (南朝内裏千首, 1377).

He had a hand in the compilation of the Shin'yō Wakashū, a quasi-imperial collection of waka that was submitted to the emperor of the Southern Court for his approval in 1381. 25 of his poems were also included in the collection.

== Works cited ==
- Fujihira, Haruo (1983). "Kōun". Nihon Koten Bungaku Daijiten 日本古典文学大辞典 (in Japanese). Vol. 2. Tokyo: Iwanami Shoten. pp. 475–476. OCLC 11917421.
