= Morichika =

Morichika may refer to:

- Morichika (TV series), a 2021 Bangladeshi TV series
- Morichika, a 1972 Assamese film
- Chōsokabe Morichika, Japanese samurai
- Kitabatake Morichika, Japanese noble
- Rinnosuke Morichika, fictional character
