= Abeno Shrine =

Shrine in Osaka Prefecture, Japan

Abeno Shrine (阿部野神社)
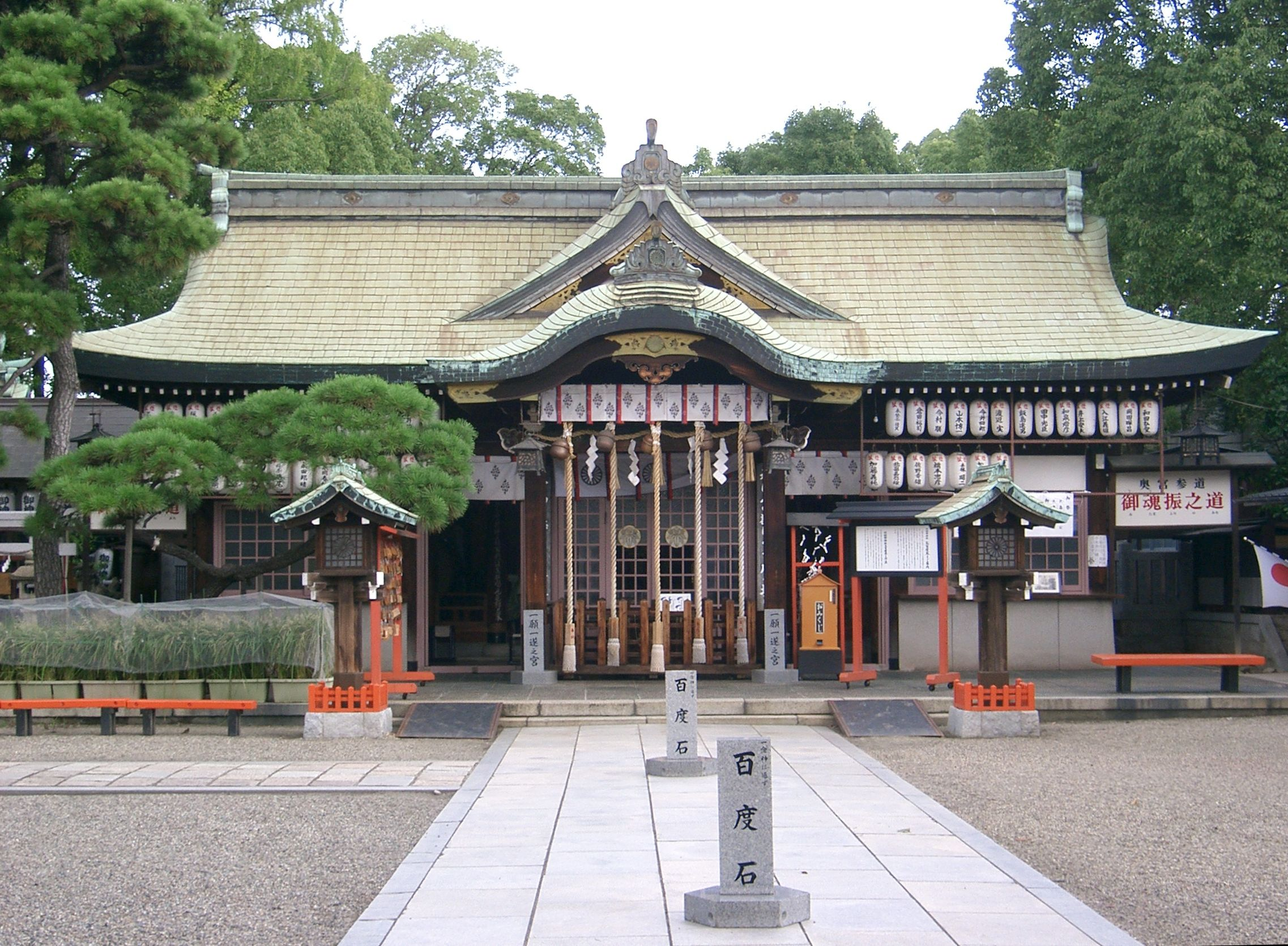
- Abeno Shrine worship hall

- Location within Japan

Religion
- Affiliation: Shinto

Location
- Coordinates: 34°37′42″N 135°29′58″E

Abeno Shrine (阿部野神社, Abeno jinja) is a Shinto shrine located in Abeno-ku, Osaka Prefecture, Japan. Its main festival is held annually on January 24. It was founded in 1882, and enshrines the kami of Kitabatake Chikafusa and Kitabatake Akiie. It is one of the Fifteen Shrines of the Kenmu Restoration.

== See also ==
- Fifteen Shrines of the Kenmu Restoration
