= Shijōnawate Shrine =

Shinto shrine located in Shijōnawate, Osaka Prefecture, Japan

Shijōnawate Shrine (四條畷神社)
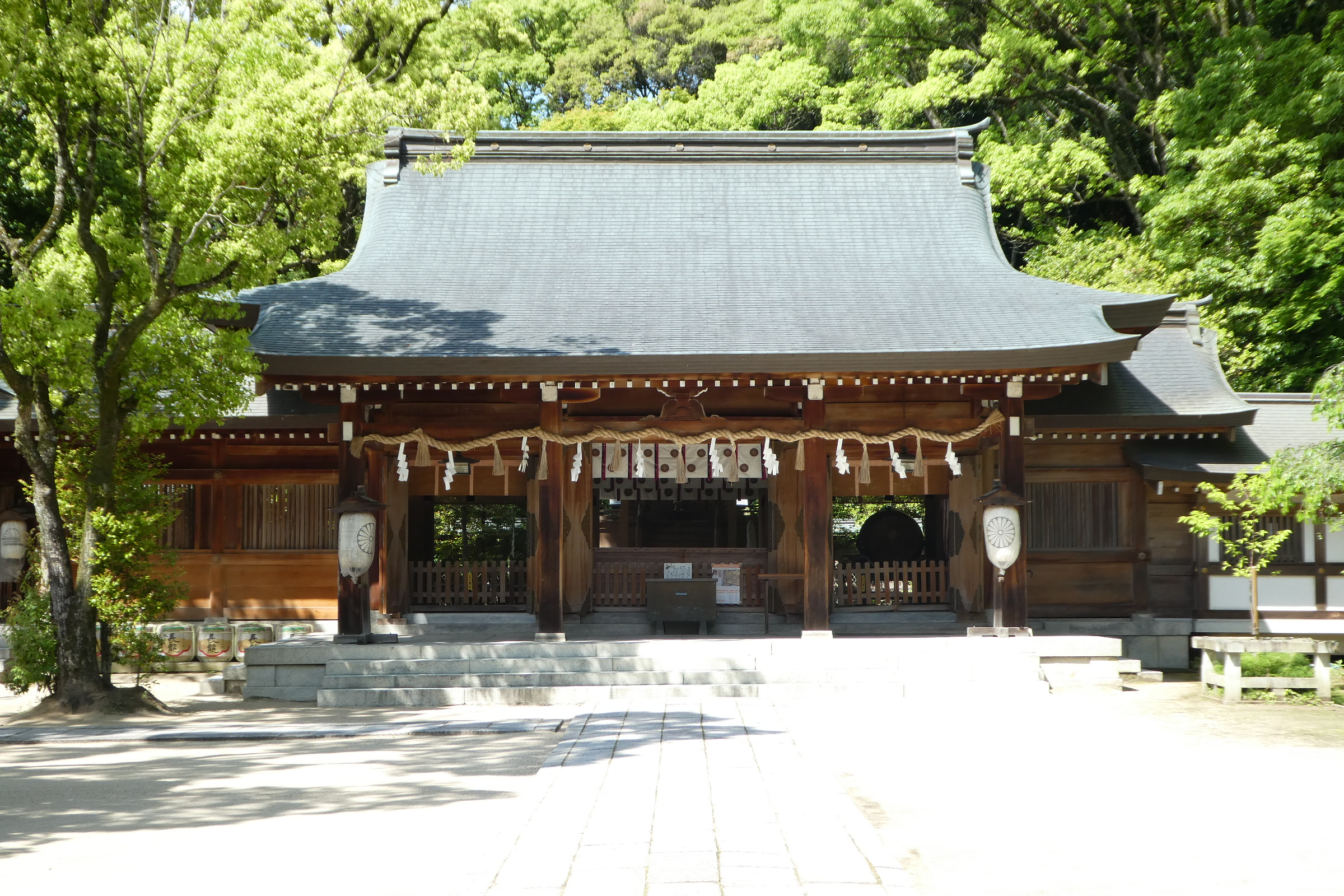
- Shijōnawate Jinja Honden

- Location within Japan

Religion
- Affiliation: Shinto

Location
- Interactive map of Shijōnawate Shrine (四條畷神社)
- Coordinates: 34°43′57″N 135°38′57″E

Shijōnawate Shrine (四條畷神社, Shijōnawate jinja) is a Shinto shrine located in Shijōnawate, Osaka Prefecture, Japan. Its main festival is held annually on February 12. It was founded in 1890, and enshrines Kusunoki Masatsura along with 24 other kami. It is one of the Fifteen Shrines of the Kenmu Restoration.

== See also ==
- Fifteen Shrines of the Kenmu Restoration
