= Kōun Senshu =

Poetry anthology written in Medieval Japan

The Kōun Senshu (耕雲千首) is a Japanese anthology of waka poetry. It contains 1,000 poems written by Kazan'in Nagachika, also known as Kōun, who presented it to the Southern Court in Yamato Province in the spring of 1377, having been unable to do so the previous year due to illness. Nagachika was in his twenties when he composed the poems.

The work contains extensive commentary and appraisal of the poems by Prince Munenaga, and survives in a variety of manuscripts, several in the holdings of the Imperial Household Agency.

== Authorship and date ==
The Kōun Senshu is an anthology of 1,000 waka in one volume, written by Kazan'in Nagachika, whose art name was Kōun.

It was presented to the Southern Court in the spring of Tenju 3 (1377).

== Content ==
In 1376, the Southern Court had had a 1,000-waka fete at the palace. Six people had made entries: Emperor Chōkei, Prince Hironari (春宮熙成親王), the kanpaku Nijō Noriyori (関白二条教頼), Fujiwara no Morokane (藤原師兼), Fujiwara no Tsunetaka (藤原経高) and Prince Munenaga. Munenaga also appraised the work of the other five.

Nagachika, who had been absent from court due to illness, presented his 1,000 poems the following year.

Only those of Prince Munenaga and Nagachika survive in their entirety, but the surviving manuscripts of Nagachika's include some critical remarks by Prince Munenaga.

Nagachika was in his late twenties when he composed the thousand poems, and the surviving comments by Prince Munenaga are exhaustive.

== Textual tradition ==
The manuscript currently in the possession of the Archives and Mausolea Department of the Imperial Household Agency (formerly owned by the estate of Nobutsuna Sasaki) contains a long and detailed prose work of poetic criticism written by Prince Munenaga and addressed to Nagachika.

Some of the manuscripts have been edited and only include the first book of the work. The copy held by the Yūtoku Inari Shrine in Saga Prefecture, is one of these.

== Works cited ==
- Fujihira, Haruo (1983). "Kōun Senshu". Nihon Koten Bungaku Daijiten 日本古典文学大辞典 (in Japanese). Vol. 2. Tokyo: Iwanami Shoten. pp. 476–477. OCLC 11917421.
