= Nawa Shrine =

Shinto shrine in Tottori Prefecture, Japan

Nawa Jinja (名和神社)
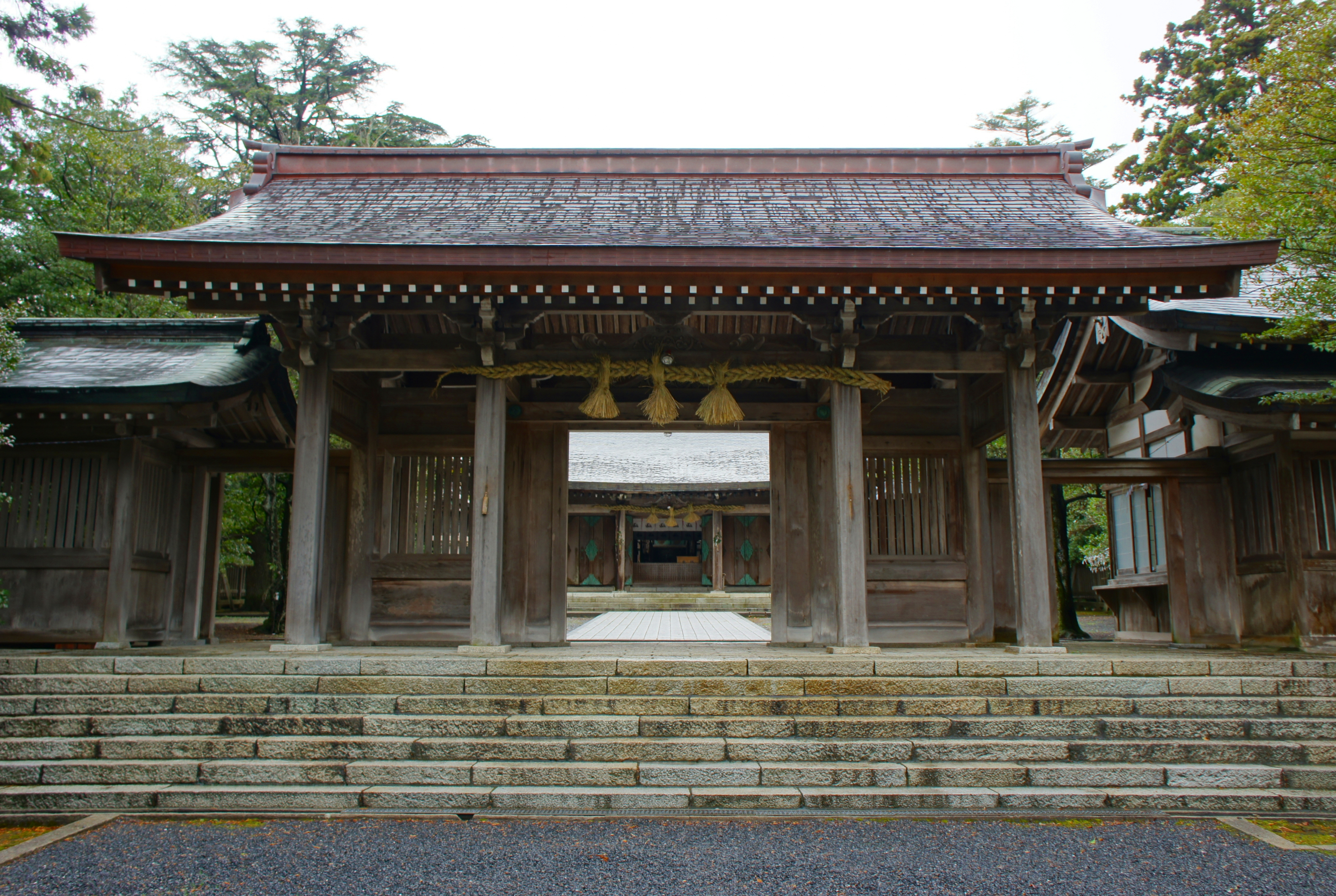
- Nawa Jinja in Daisen

- Location within Japan

Religion
- Affiliation: Shinto

Location
- Interactive map of Nawa Jinja (名和神社)
- Coordinates: 35°30′16″N 133°29′42″E

Nawa Jinja (名和神社) is a Shinto shrine in Daisen, Tottori Prefecture, Japan. It is celebrated for its cherry blossoms. It is one of the Fifteen Shrines of the Kenmu Restoration, dedicated to the memory of Nawa Nagatoshi.

== See also ==
- Mount Daisen
- Ōgamiyama Jinja
