= Uda-Matsuyama Domain =

Japanese feudal domain located in Higo Province

Uda-Matsuyama Domain 宇陀松山藩
- Domain of Japan
- 1600–1695
- Mon of the Oda clan
- Capital: Unknown
  - Type: Daimyō
- Historical era: Edo period
  - Established: 1600
  - Disestablished: 1695
- Today part of: Nara Prefecture

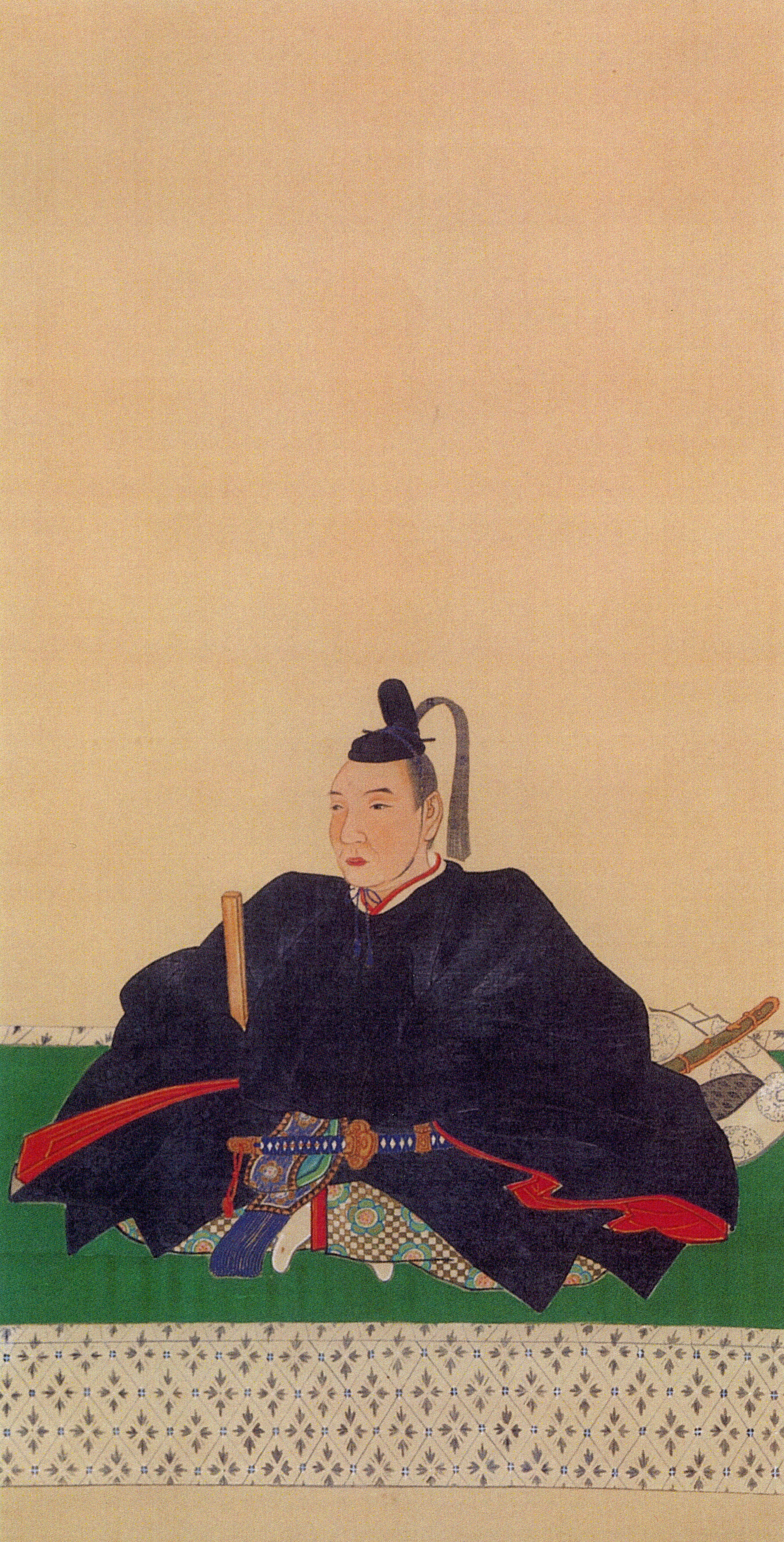
Oda Nobukatsu, the first daimyo of Uda-Matsuyama Domain

The Uda-Matsuyama Domain (宇陀松山藩, Uda-Matsuyama han) was a Japanese domain of the Edo period, located in Yamato Province (modern-day Uda, Nara). It was ruled for most of its history by the Oda clan.

The domain was disbanded in 1695, when the last lord, Oda Nobuyasu, was moved to the Tanba-Kaibara Domain, and his income reduced to 20,000 koku.

== History ==
Due to the victory in the Battle of Sekigahara, Fukushima Takuharu was transferred from Nagashima, Ise Province with more than 30,000 koku and established a domain. Takaharu was deprived of his fief due to the suspicion of secretly communicating with the Toyotomi clan in the Summer Siege of Osaka in 1615, and Oda Nobukatsu was given 50,000 koku in accordance with both Yamato Province and Kozu Province. At that time, he was also given the rank of kokushu because he was the son of Oda Nobunaga, who was the ruler of the country.

Nobukatsu gave the territory of Ueno to his fourth son Nobuyoshi, and he himself owned 28,000 koku of Yamato as a retirement territory. When Nobukatsu died in 1630, the fifth son Takanaga inherited the territory of Yamato. After that, it continued with Nagayori and Nobutake, but there was confusion in the domain and Nobutake committed suicide (Uda Kuzure). Respected for being Nobunaga's bloodline, the inheritance of the family estate to Nobutake's son, Nobukyu, was allowed, but the territory was reduced to 20,000 koku and transferred to the Tanba-Kashiwabara Domain. The treatment that was treated as a national lord was also stripped at this time. The Uda-Matsuyama Domain was abolished afterwards.

== List of daimyo ==
#	Name	Tenure	Courtesy title	Court Rank	kokudaka
Fukushima clan, 1600–1615 (Tozama daimyo)
1	Fukushima Takaharu (福島タカハル)	1600–1615	Kamebu-gashira (カメブケシラ)	Junior 5th Rank, Lower Grade (従五位下)	31,717 koku
Oda clan, 1615–1695 (Tozama daimyo)
1	Nobukatsu (織田信勝)	1615–1630	Jiju Shogoinoge(ジジュ、ショゴイノゲ)	Senior 5th Rank, Lower Grade (従五位下)	28,000 koku
2	Takenaga (小田タナガ)	1630–1659	Izumo no kami (出雲の神)	Junior 5th Rank, Lower Grade (従五位下)	28,000 koku
3	Naganori (小田長矩)	1659–1689	Yamashiro no kami (山城の神)	Junior 5th Rank, Lower Grade (従五位下)	28,000 koku
4	Nobutake (小田信武)	1689–1694	Mamoru Izumo (出雲マモル)	Junior 5th Rank, Lower Grade (従五位下)	28,000 koku
5	Nobuyasu (織田信康)	1694–1695	Mamoru Yamashiro (山城マモル)	Junior 5th Rank, Lower Grade (従五位下)	28,000 koku
