= Yoshino Shrine =

Shrine in Nara Prefecture, Japan

Yoshino Shrine 吉野神宮
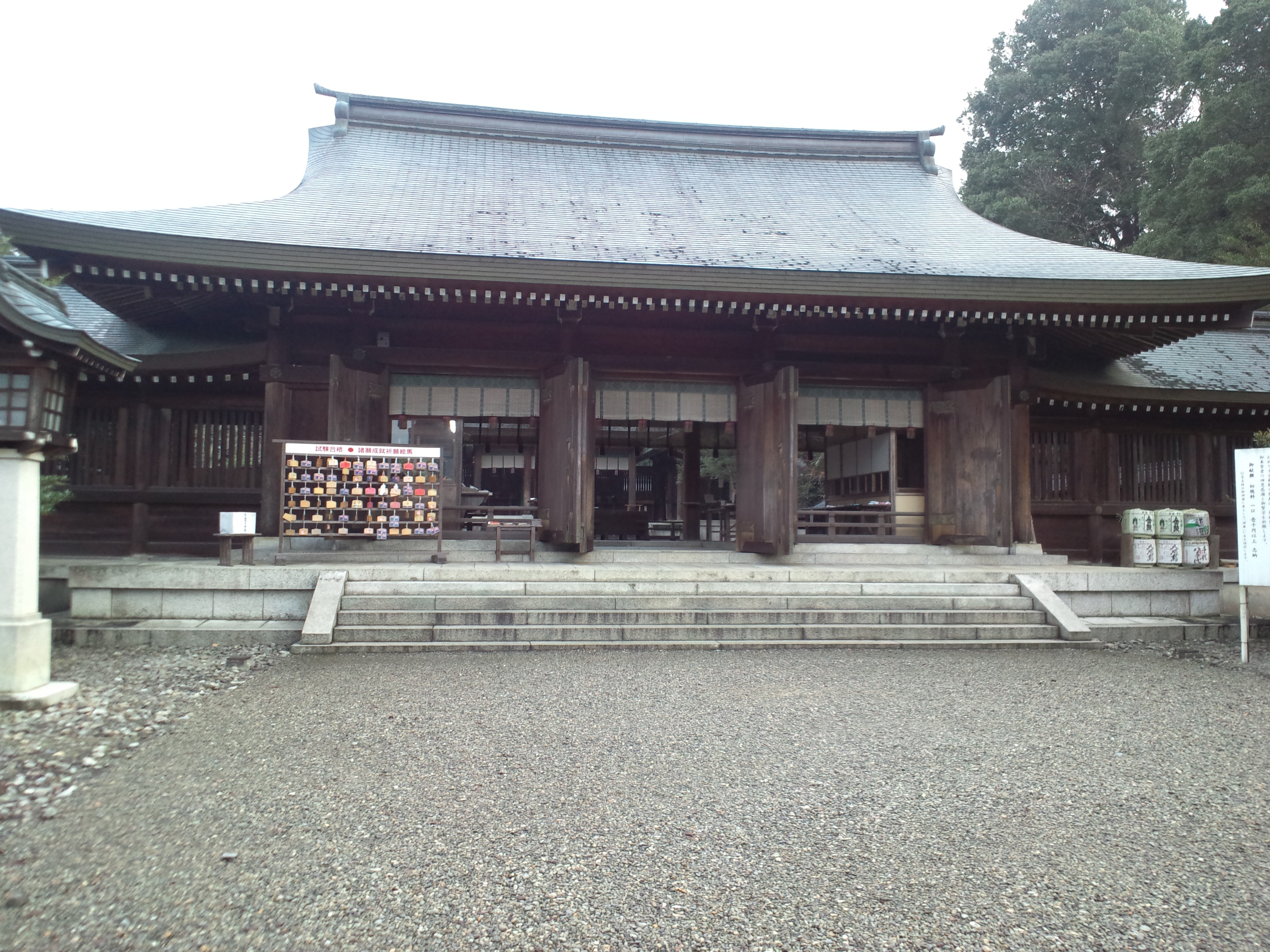
- Yoshino-jingū Gehaiden

- Location within Japan

Religion
- Affiliation: Shinto
- Deity: Emperor Go-Daigo
- Festival: 27 September

Location
- Location: 3226 Ōaza Yoshinoyama; Yoshino, Yoshino District, Nara Prefecture
- Interactive map of Yoshino Shrine 吉野神宮
- Coordinates: 34°23′4″N 135°50′44″E

Architecture
- Established: 1892

Website
- www.naranet.co.jp/yoshinojingu/

Yoshino Shrine (吉野神宮, Yoshino jingū) is a Shinto shrine located in Yoshino, Yoshino District, Nara Prefecture, Japan. Prefecture, Japan. It was founded in 1892. The main kami enshrined here is Emperor Go-Daigo. The shrine's main festival is held annually on September 27. It was formerly an imperial shrine of the first rank (官幣大社, kanpei taisha) in the Modern system of ranked Shinto Shrines.

It is one of the Fifteen Shrines of the Kenmu Restoration.

== See also ==
- List of Jingū
