= Kitabatake Morichika =

Japanese court noble

Kitabatake Morichika 北畠守親
- Dainagon, Senior 2nd Rank (Southern Court)
- Lords: Emperor Go-Murakami (until 1368); Emperor Chōkei (1368 – 1383); Emperor Go-Kameyama (after 1383)
- Born: Unknown
- Died: Unknown
Era dates
- Nanboku-chō
- Clan: Kitabatake clan
- Father: Kitabatake Akinobu

Kitabatake Morichika (北畠守親, dates unclear) was a Japanese court noble, and an important supporter of the Southern Court during the Nanboku-chō Wars. His father was Kitabatake Akinobu.

His kami is enshrined at Ryōzen Shrine in Date, Fukushima Prefecture, which is one of the Fifteen Shrines of the Kenmu Restoration.
