= Komikado Shrine =

Shinto shrine in Chiba Prefecture, Japan

Coordinates: 35°51′21″N 140°21′31″E

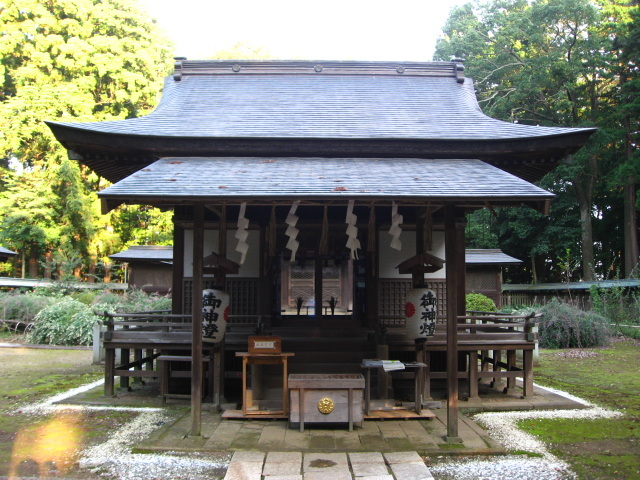

Komikado Shrine (小御門神社, Komikado jinja) is a Shinto shrine located in Narita, Chiba Prefecture, Japan. Its main festival is held annually on April 29. It was founded in 1882, and enshrines the kami of Kazan'in Morokata. It is one of the Fifteen Shrines of the Kenmu Restoration.

== See also ==
- Fifteen Shrines of the Kenmu Restoration
