= Oda Nobukatsu =

Japanese samurai

- 織田 信雄
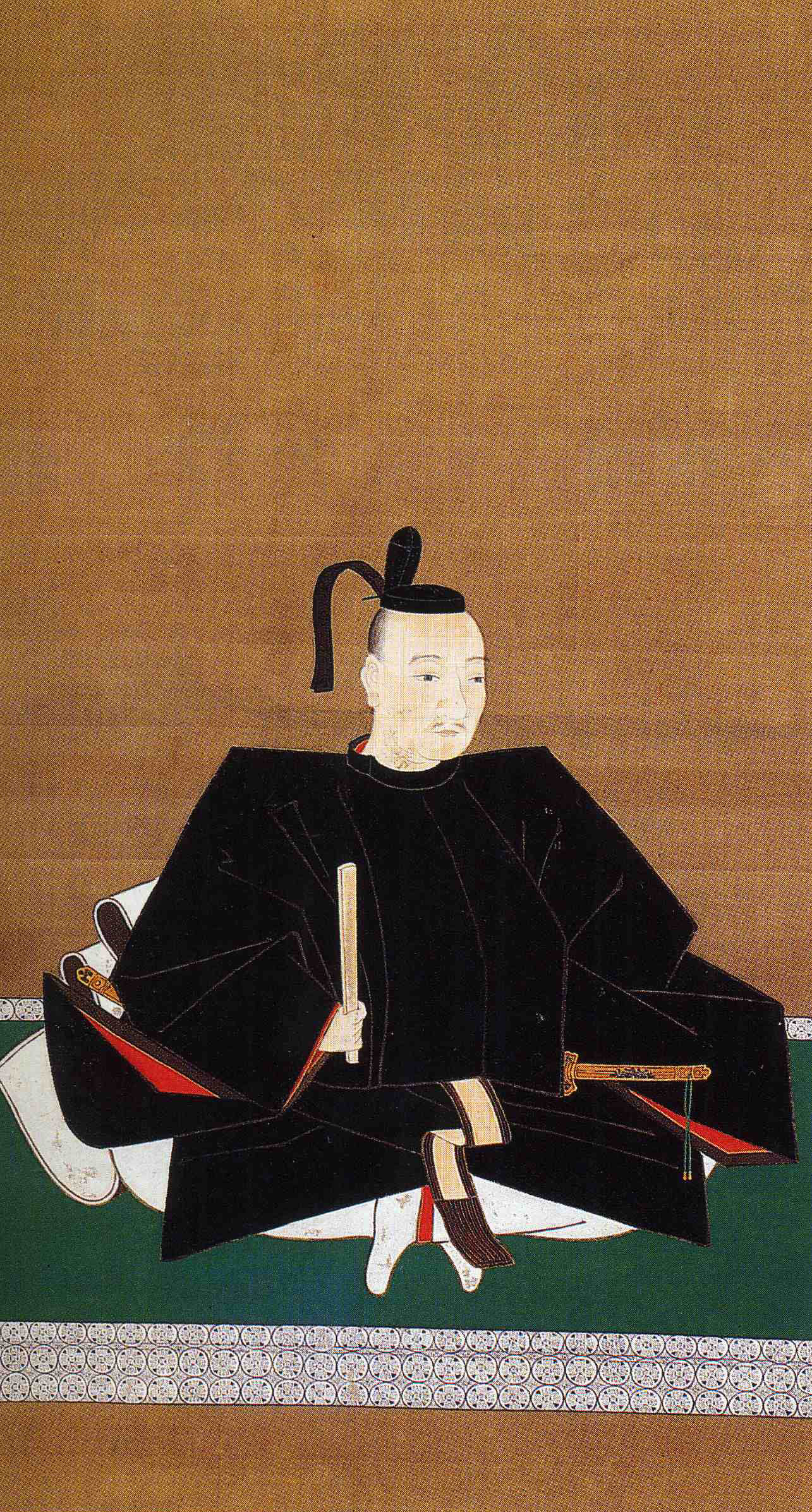

Daimyō of Uda-Matsuyama
- In office 1615–1630
- Preceded by: Fukushima Takaharu
- Succeeded by: Oda Takanaga

Head of Oda clan
- In office 1605–1630
- Preceded by: Oda Hidenobu
- Succeeded by: Oda Nagamasa

Personal details
- Born: 1558
- Died: June 10, 1630 (aged 71–72)
- Spouse: Kitabatake Tomonori's daughter
- Parents: Oda Nobunaga (father); Kitsuno (mother)
- Nickname: "Oda Nobuo"

Military service
- Allegiance: Oda clan Toyotomi clan Tokugawa shogunate
- Unit: Kitabatake clan
- Battles/wars: Tenshō Iga War; Battle of Shizugatake; Battle of Komaki and Nagakute; Siege of Odawara; Korean Campaign; Siege of Osaka

Oda Nobukatsu (織田 信雄; 1558 – June 10, 1630) also known as Kitabatake Tomotoyo was a Japanese samurai of the Azuchi–Momoyama period. He was the second son of Oda Nobunaga. He was adopted as the head of the Kitabatake clan from Ise Province. He survived the decline of the Oda clan from political prominence, becoming a daimyō in the early Edo period. Though often described as an incompetent general, Nobukatsu was a skilled warrior. In the battle of Komaki and Nagakute, he used a 13th-century tachi of the Fukuoka Ichimonji school, to slay a samurai known as Okada Sukesaburō. The blade came to be known as "Okada-giri Yoshifusa", now a national treasure.

== Biography ==
In 1570, Nobukatsu became an adopted heir of the Kitabatake clan and married a daughter of the former lord of Kitabatake, Tomonori. The true nature of this marriage was a condition of truce forced by the Oda clan to the Kitabatake clan.

In 1575, Nobukatsu officially became the head of the family. The next year, he killed his father-in-law, imprisoned the previous lord, who was his father by adoption, and completely took over the Kitabatake clan.

In 1579, eager to achieve fame, Nobukatsu directed a first invasion of Iga, Iga Province, which only ended in disastrous failure and severe rebuke from his father.

Two years later in 1581, Nobunaga himself led the second invasion with an army of several ten thousand, destroyed the whole region and placing control of Iga province in Nobukatsu's hands.

=== Death of Nobunaga ===
When Nobunaga and his heir, Nobutada, died at the Honnō-ji incident in 1582, problems arose about who would succeed the lordship of Oda clan. When Nobukatsu and his younger brother, Nobutaka, quarreled over the matter, a council decided on the infant son of Nobutada, Oda Hidenobu. The opinion of Toyotomi Hideyoshi was most influential on this decision.

At this point, Nobukatsu changed his surname back to Oda. He succeeded his father as lord of Owari, Mino and Ise Provinces.

=== Decline of Nobukatsu ===
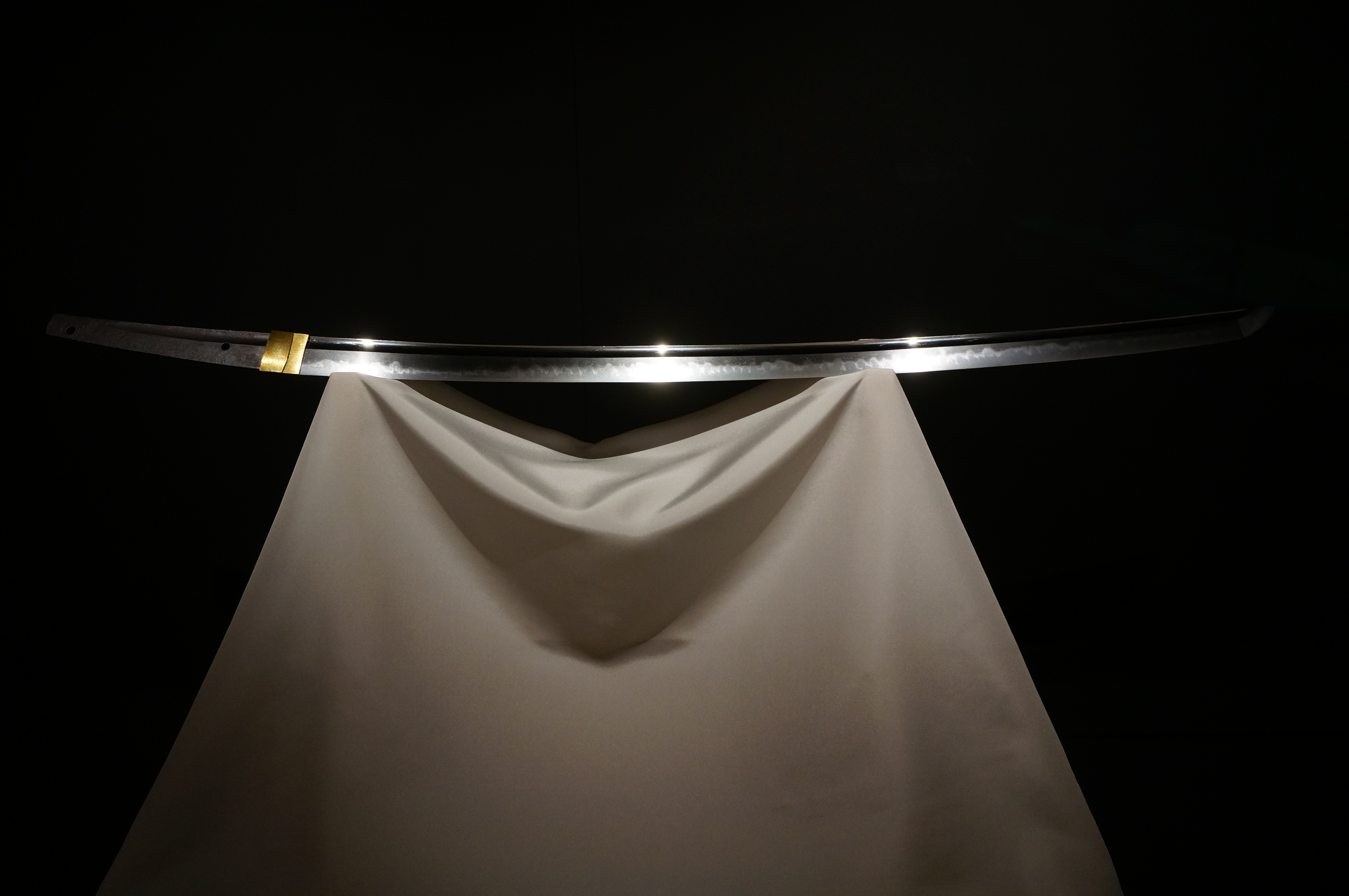
A tachi Okadagiri Yoshifusa made in the Kamakura period. The name of this tachi comes from the fact that during the Battle of Komaki and Nagakute in 1584, Oda Nobuo used this sword to kill Okada Shigetaka, his retainer who was suspected of being a traitor. National Treasure

In 1583, during the succeeding chaotic years, Nobukatsu joined with Hideyoshi to destroy Oda Nobutaka. However, soon their relationship became hostile too, and Nobukatsu allied with Tokugawa Ieyasu to fight Hideyoshi in the Battle of Komaki and Nagakute in 1584. After more than a half year of battles, Hideyoshi persuaded Nobukatsu to make peace, offering him the security of the dominion. Nobukatsu took this offer and practically became a retainer of Hideyoshi.

Later in 1590, when he served at the Odawara Campaign, he refused to accept Hideyoshi's order to change his dominion, and later he not only lost his original domain but was also forced to become a monk under the supervision of some Toyotomi retainers. A few years later, Hideyoshi's anger eased and Nobukatsu regained some land to rule.

In 1598, he became the guardian of Toyotomi Hideyori after Hideyoshi's death.

However in 1615, he betrayed the Toyotomi clan at the Siege of Osaka, and surrendered to Tokugawa Ieyasu. As a result, he was permitted to remain a daimyō by the Tokugawa shogunate. Though he is often described as an incompetent general, he managed to survive the series of upheavals.

After the establishment of the Tokugawa shogunate, he became the lord of the Uda-Matsuyama Domain in Yamato Province (modern-day Nara Prefecture), and comfortably lived the rest of his life.

== Family ==
- Father: Oda Nobunaga (1534–1582)
- Adopted Father: Kitabatake Tomonori
- Brothers:
  - Oda Nobutada (1557–1582)
  - Oda Nobutaka (1558–1583)
  - Hashiba Hidekatsu (1567–1585)
  - Oda Katsunaga (1568–1582)
  - Oda Nobuhide (1571–1597)
  - Oda Nobutaka (1576–1602)
  - Oda Nobuyoshi (1573–1615)
  - Oda Nobusada (1574–1624)
  - Oda Nobuyoshi (died 1609)
  - Oda Nagatsugu (died 1600)
  - Oda Nobumasa (1554–1647)
- Sisters:
  - Tokuhime (1559–1636)
  - Fuyuhime (1561–1641)
  - Hideko (died 1632)
  - Eihime (1574–1623)
  - Hōonin
  - Sannomarudono (died 1603)
  - Tsuruhime
- Children:
  - Oda Hidekatsu
  - O-hime (1585-1591), married Tokugawa Hidetada
  - Okani
  - Oda Takao
  - Oda Nobuyoshi (1584-1626)
  - Oda Takanaga (1590-1674)
  - Oda Nobutame (died 1666)
  - Oda Yoshio (died 1651)
  - Oda Nagao
  - Gyokuyūin (Yae-hime, wife of Hjikata Katsutaka)

== In popular culture ==
Nobukatsu appears as a mere fool in the comedy film The Kiyosu Conference (2013), but is portrayed somewhat sympathetically in the action film Mumon: The Land of Stealth (2017).

== See also ==
- Rakusan-en

Preceded by Kitabatake Tomofusa	Kitabatake family head 1572–1582	Succeeded by none
Preceded by Fukushima Takaharu	1st (Oda) Lord of Uda-Matsuyama; 1615–1630	Succeeded by Oda Takanaga
