= Takauji =

Takauji (written: 尊氏 or 高氏) is a masculine Japanese given name. Notable people with the name include:

- Ashikaga Takauji (足利 尊氏) (1305–1358), Japanese shōgun
- Sasaki Takauji (佐々木 高氏) (1306–1373), Japanese samurai
