= Kamakura-gū =

Shinto shrine in Kanagawa Prefecture, Japan

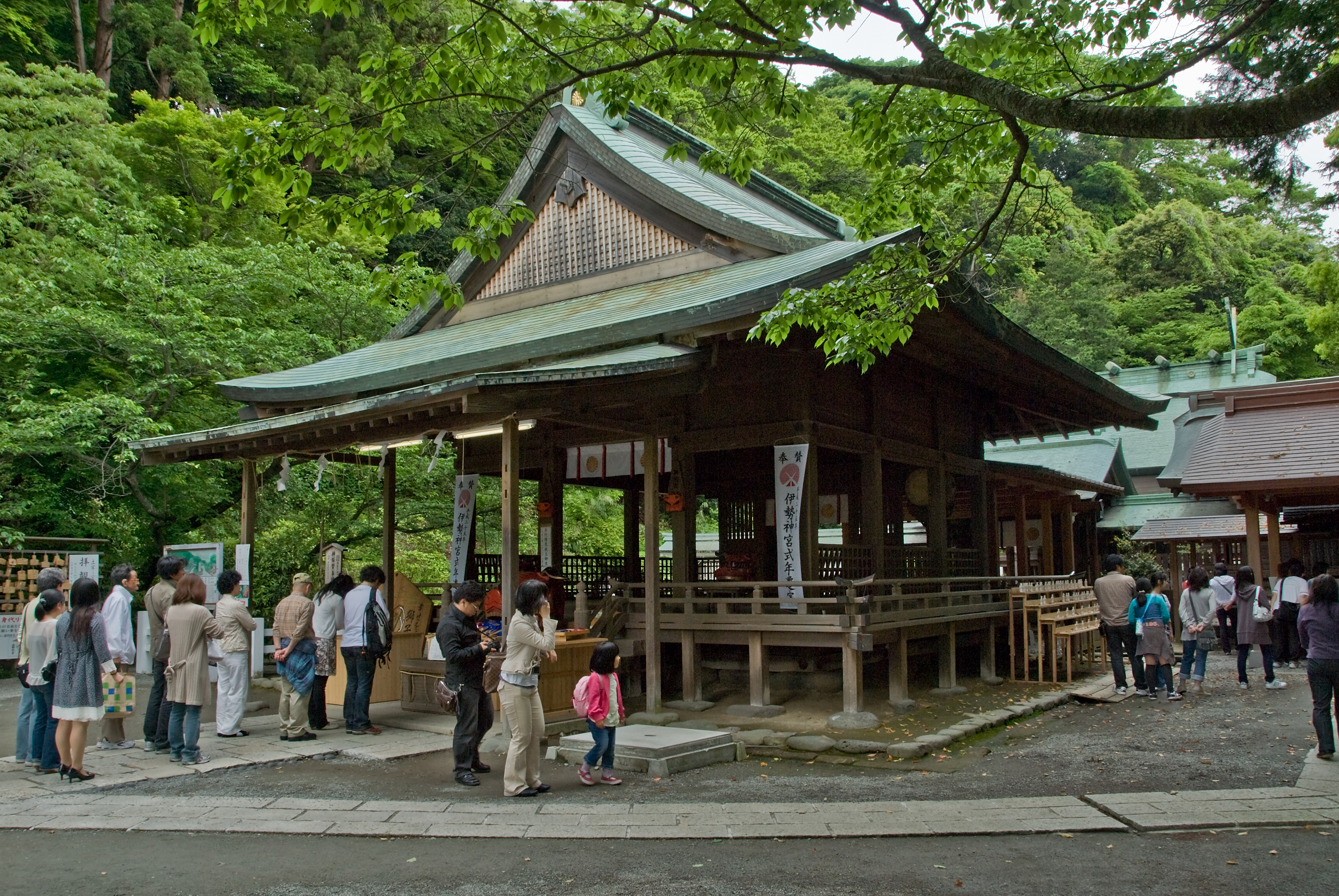
- The haiden

- Location within Japan

Religion
- Affiliation: Shinto
- Deity: Prince Morinaga

Location
- Location: 154 Nikaidō, Kamakura, Kanagawa 248–0002
- Interactive map of Kamakura-gū
- Coordinates: 35°19′34″N 139°34′0″E

Architecture
- Founder: Meiji Emperor
- Established: 1869

Website
- www.kamakuraguu.jp

Kamakura-gū (鎌倉宮) is a shrine in Kamakura, Kanagawa Prefecture, Japan. It was erected by Emperor Meiji in 1869 to enshrine the spirit of Prince Morinaga, who was imprisoned and later executed where the shrine now stands in 1335 by order of Ashikaga Tadayoshi. For this reason, the shrine is also known as Ōtōnomiya or Daitōnomiya (大塔宮) from the Prince's full name (Ōtōnomiya Morinaga).

Prince Morinaga was Ashikaga Takauji's most dangerous political rival in Kyoto, so he was arrested with a pretext by him in 1334 and first kept prisoner there, then had him sent to Kamakura. Ashikaga's younger brother Tadayoshi held Morinaga captive for nine months in a small cave at the site of the present Kamakura-gū. When Tadayoshi was forced to retreat from Kamakura after losing a battle to Hōjō Tokiyuki, before leaving he gave the order for Morinaga's execution. The Prince was beheaded on July 23, 1335. The cave still exists today in the rockface behind the shrine, and is a tourist attraction. It is four meters deep and has an area of 12 square meters.

It is one of the Fifteen Shrines of the Kenmu Restoration.

== See also ==
- Modern system of ranked Shinto Shrines
