= Nawa Nagatoshi =

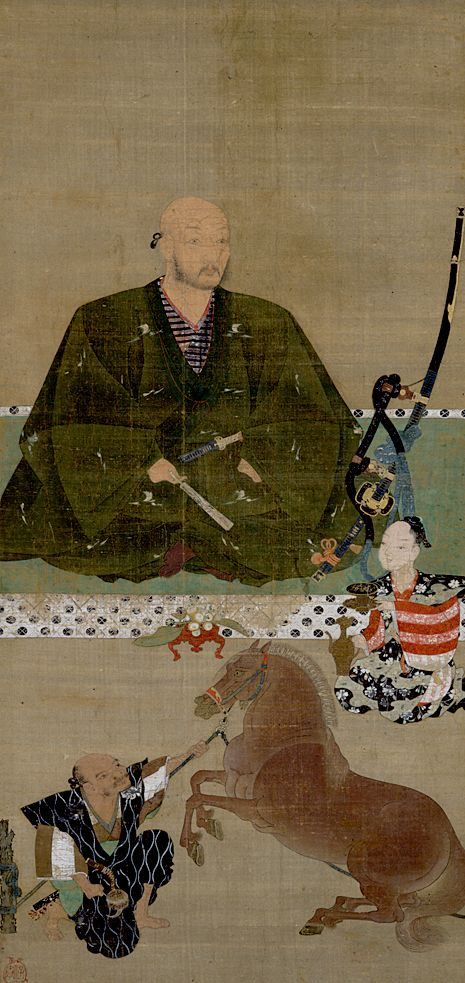
- Born: Unknown
- Died: August 7, 1336

Nawa Nagatoshi (名和長年) (died August 7, 1336) was a Kamakura Period military figure who defended the Southern Court during the Nanboku-chō period.

Nawa was appointed Governor of Hoki Province as a reward for his support of Go-Daigo during the Genko War.

After the Battle of Minatogawa and the entry of Takauji into Kyoto, Loyalists forces continued to oppose him. In particular, Nawa led a force against the Toji temple, where Takauiji had installed the future Emperor Komyo. However, Nawa's attack was stopped and Nawa killed.

He is enshrined at Nawa Shrine in Daisen, Tottori Prefecture.
