= Kitabatake Tomonori =

Japanese military figure

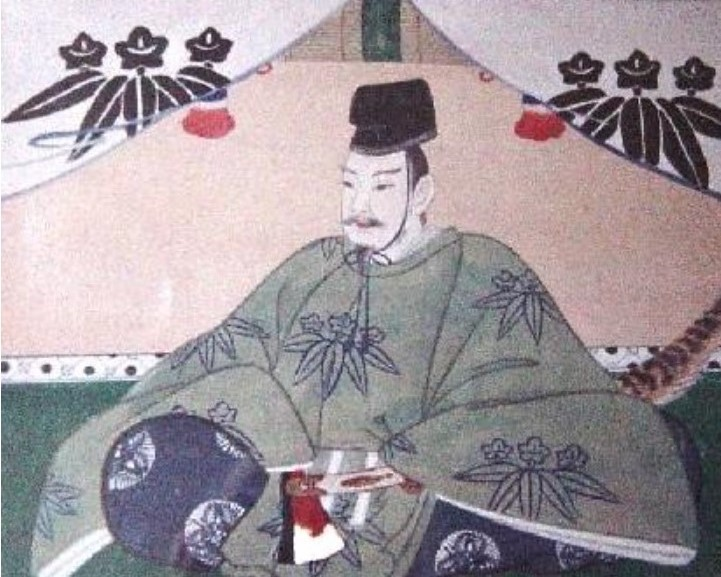
Portrait of Kitabatake Tomonori

Kitabatake Tomonori (北畠 具教; 1528 – 15 December 1576) was the head of Kitabatake clan, lord of south Ise Province, who ruled from Kitabatake Shrine in Mie Prefecture. He learned swordsmanship from Tsukahara Bokuden and so was famous as a skilled swordsman. His territory was invaded by Oda Nobunaga in 1569. He surrendered and adopted Nobunaga's second son Oda Nobukatsu.

In 1576, Tomonori was killed by Oda Nobunaga's army during the siege of Mie.
