= Kazan'in Morokata =

Kazan'in Morokata (花山院師賢, c. 1301–1332) was a nobleman and poet of the Kamakura period. The son of Kazan'in Moronobu, he is enshrined at Komikado Shrine, a Shinto shrine located in Narita, Chiba Prefecture.

Among his children was Kazan'in Iekata.
