= Kitabatake Akinobu =

Japanese court noble

Kitabatake Akinobu (北畠顕信) (1320 – 1380) was a Japanese court noble, and an important supporter of the Southern Court during the Nanboku-chō Wars. His father was imperial advisor Kitabatake Chikafusa. His daughter became empress of Emperor Go-Kameyama.

His kami is enshrined at Ryōzen Shrine in Date, Fukushima Fukushima Prefecture, which is one of the Fifteen Shrines of the Kenmu Restoration.
