= Kitabatake Akiie =

Japanese court noble

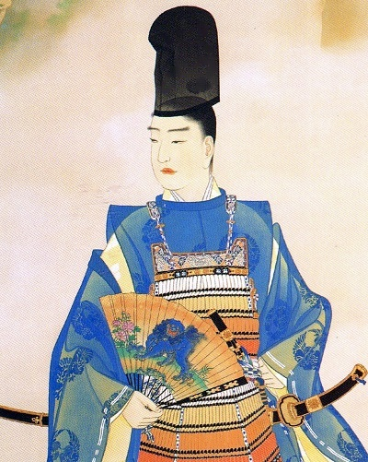
- Kitabatake Akiie (portrait property of Ryozen Shrine)
- Born: April 3, 1318
- Died: June 10, 1338 (aged 20); Ishizu in Izumi (present day Osaka)
- Occupation: Commander-in-Chief of the Defense of the North
- Years active: 1333-1338

Kitabatake Akiie (北畠 顕家; 1318 – June 10, 1338) was a Japanese court noble, and an important supporter of the Southern Court during the Nanboku-chō Wars. He also held the posts of Commander-in-Chief of the Defense of the North, and Governor of Mutsu Province. His father was Imperial advisor Kitabatake Chikafusa.

== Biography ==
In 1333, Akiie was ordered to accompany the six-year-old eighth son of Emperor Go-Daigo, Prince Norinaga (also read as Noriyoshi), to Mutsu, where the Prince became Governor-General of Mutsu and Dewa. These two large provinces constituted much of the north-eastern end of Honshū, the area now known as Tōhoku.

In April 1333, he was appointed to the post of Chinjufu-shōgun, or Commander-in-Chief of the Defense of the North. This was a position that had been held by Minamoto no Yoshiie two hundred years earlier. A number of families formed a league under his direction, supporting the Southern Court; these included the samurai families of Yūki, Date, Nambu, Soma, and Tamura.

The Soma and several other daimyō were convinced to change sides by Takauji, however.

Three years later, he led an army nominally under the command of Norinaga to the outskirts of Kyoto to reinforce the forces of Nitta Yoshisada against Ashikaga Takauji. Nitta and Kitabatake were aided by warrior monks from Enryakuji, and the temple of Miidera, whose monks supported Ashikaga Takauji, was burned to the ground.

Traveling to Kyūshū, Kitabatake gathered support for the Southern Court in the absence of Ashikaga Takauji, one of the strongest leaders of the Northern Court.

In 1337, despite facing opposition at home in the north, Kitabatake was ordered by Emperor Go-Daigo to come to the aid of his army to the south of Kyoto. Kitabatake led his forces slowly south, fighting the Northern Court in many battles. He was defeated at the Tone River before pushing south and occupying Kamakura, the capital of the Ashikaga shogunate, and making his way to Nara, fighting at Iga and Sekigahara. In Nara, while trying to rest and reorganize his forces, he was set upon by Kō no Moronao and barely escaped to Kawachi Province. He recouped and pushed through enemy forces at Tennōji (near modern-day Osaka), but was eventually defeated and killed at Izumi in 1338 at the age of twenty-one. His death is described in the epic Taiheiki and in his father's Jinnō Shōtōki.

His kami is enshrined at Ryōzen Shrine in Date, Fukushima Prefecture and Abeno Shrine in Osaka, both of which are among the Fifteen Shrines of the Kenmu Restoration.

The tomb of Kitabatake Akiie is located nearby Abeno Shrine, in Osaka.

== Lineage ==
- Father: Kitabatake Chikafusa
- Mother: Unknown
- Spouse: A woman related to Hino Suketomo (日野資朝), (? - 1341?)
  - Son: Kitabatake Akinari (北畠顕成), (1335 - 1386/1402) - His descendants formed the Namioka Clan
  - Daughter: Wife of Andō Sadasue (安藤貞季)
  - Son: Kitabatake Moroaki? (北畠師顕) - His descendants formed the Tokioka Clan

== Pop culture ==
Kitabatake Akiie is depicted as a supporting character in Yusei Masui's manga, The Elusive Samurai.
