= Kitabatake clan =

Samurai Clan

Kitabatake clan 北畠氏
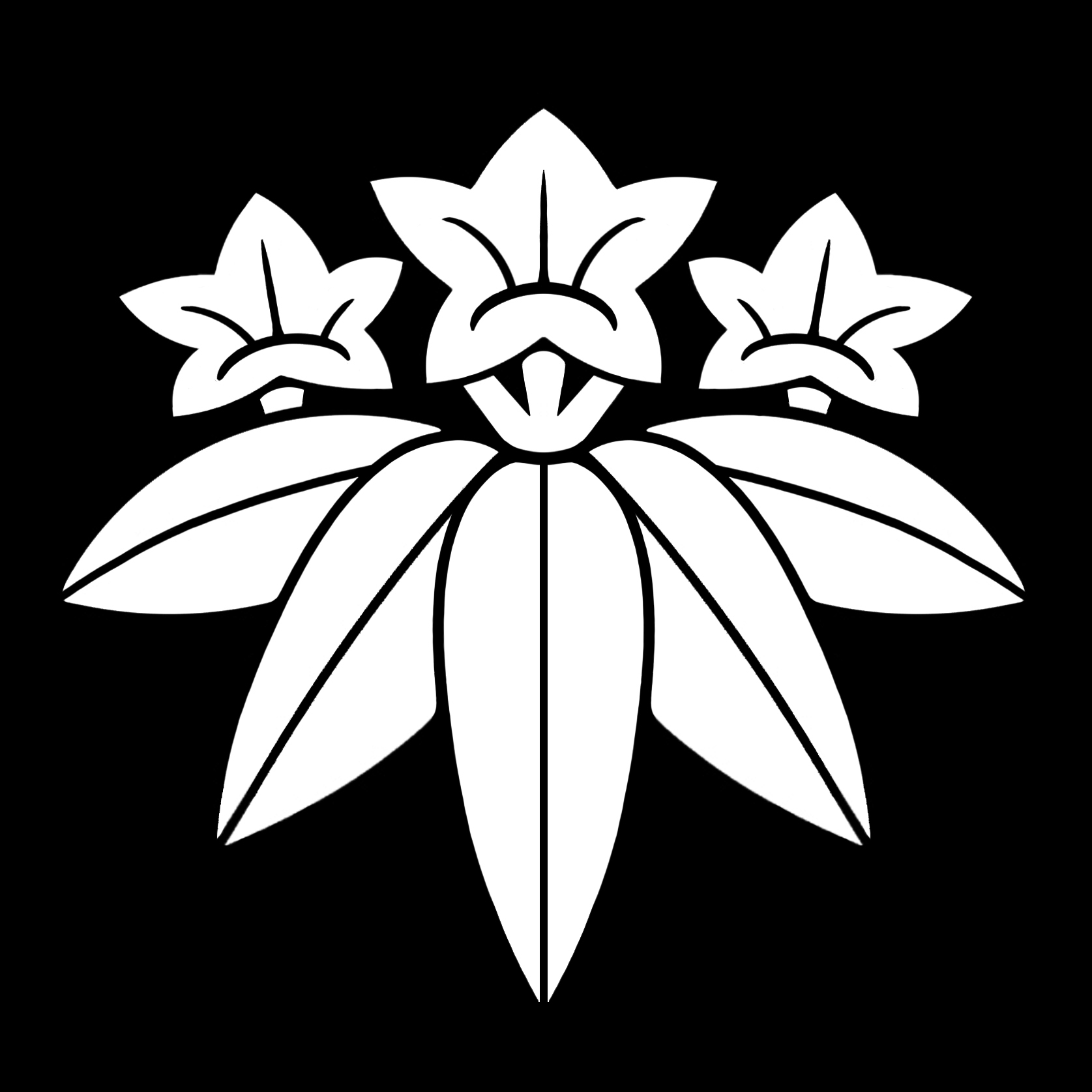
- Mon of Kitabatake clan
- Home province: Ise
- Parent house: Minamoto clan (Murakami Genji)

The Kitabatake clan was a clan that ruled south Ise Province in Japan and had strong ties to the eastern provinces through Pacific sea routes. Among its leaders included Kitabatake Tomonori.

== Clan heads ==
1. Kitabatake Masaie (1215–1274, founder)
2. Kitabatake Morochika (1244–1315)
3. Kitabatake Moroshige (1270–1322)
4. Kitabatake Chikafusa (1293–1354)
5. Kitabatake Akiyoshi (1326?–1383?)
6. Kitabatake Akiyasu (1361?–1414)
7. Kitabatake Mitsumasa (1382?–1429)
8. Kitabatake Noritomo (1423–1471)
9. Kitabatake Masasato (1449–1508)
10. Kitabatake Kichika (1468–1518)
11. Kitabatake Harutomo (1503–1563)
12. Kitabatake Tomonori (1528–1576)
13. Kitabatake Tomofusa (1547–1580)
14. Kitabatake Tomotoyo (Oda Nobukatsu) (1558–1630)

== See also ==
- Kitabatake Shrine
