= Kitabatake Akiyoshi =

Japanese military figure

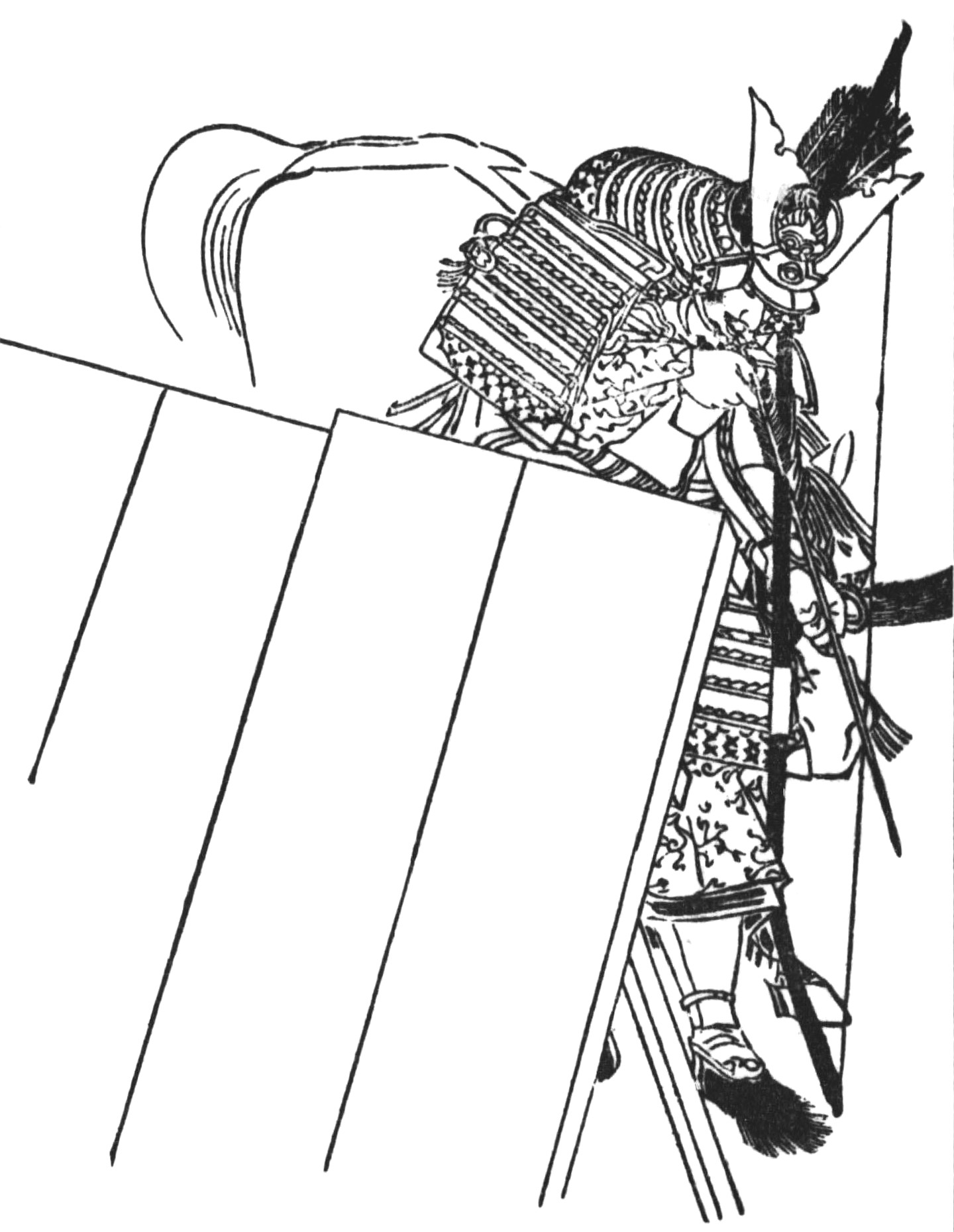
Kitabatake Akiyoshi

Kitabatake Akiyoshi (北畠顕能; 1326–1383) was a Kamakura period military figure who defended the Southern Court during the Nanboku-chō period.

The son of Kitabatake Chikafusa, he helped lead loyalist forces in the capture of Kyoto in 1352.

He is enshrined at Kitabatake Shrine in Tsu, Mie Prefecture.
