= Kitabatake Chikafusa =

14th-century Japanese court noble, author, and historian

- 北畠 親房
- Kitabatake Chikafusa, as drawn by Japanese painter Kikuchi Yosai
- Born: March 8, 1293
- Died: June 1, 1354 (aged 61); Yoshino, Nara, Ashikaga shogunate
- Occupations: Writer, counselor
- Children: Kitabatake Akiie; Kitabatake Akinobu; Kitabatake Akiyoshi
- Writing career
- Subject: Japanese history

Kitabatake Chikafusa (北畠 親房; March 8, 1293 – June 1, 1354) was a Japanese court noble and writer of the 14th century who supported the Southern Court in the Nanboku-cho period, serving as advisor to five Emperors. Some of his greatest and most famous work was performed during the reign of Emperor Go-Daigo, under whom he proposed a series of reforms, amounting to a revival or restoration of political and economic systems of several centuries earlier. In addition to authoring a history of Japan and a number of works defending the right of Go-Daigo's line to the throne, Kitabatake fought in defense of the Southern Court as a member of the Murakami branch of the Minamoto clan.

== Politics ==
Kitabatake, in his writings, held a strong distaste for the Ashikaga clan, the ruling family at the time who held the position of shōgun and maintained a rival Imperial court known as the Northern Court. This disdain came not only because they were warriors rather than nobles, who were clumsy and uncouth at court, but because they were of a less distinguished branch of the famous Minamoto clan than Kitabatake's own Murakami branch. In particular, he disliked Ashikaga Takauji, the first Ashikaga shogun, who had originally supported Go-Daigo's claim to the Throne, but who ultimately headed the Northern Court and sought to destroy all who supported the Emperor's Southern Court.

Kitabatake also wrote of Nitta Yoshisada, one of the greatest military supporters of Go-Daigo, in a bad light. He saw Nitta as a warrior, little different from the Shoguns, but also accused him of never being available when the Emperor called upon him. Had Nitta been more available in the south of the country, instead of fighting his own battles in the north, Kitabatake claims, Nitta could have prevented the death of his son Akiie.

When Go-Daigo died in 1339, Kitabatake was under siege in his stronghold in Hitachi Province. He sent copies of his major works to the new emperor, twelve-year-old Emperor Go-Murakami, advising him and his advisors. Though he is most well known for his writings and his role as Imperial advisor, Kitabatake was also a competent commander in battle, and held off the superior forces of the shogunate on many occasions. The siege of Hitachi lasted four years, and though his fortress ultimately fell to the supporters of the shogunate, Kitabatake escaped to Yoshino, the capital of the Southern Court, where he advised the Emperor until his own death in 1354.

== Works ==
In his writings on the legitimate imperial lineage, Kitabatake delved into the subject of land ownership. In one document he denounces the Provincial Shugo and Jitō (Constables and Stewards) as land-hungry, and writes that the creation of this system in 1190 altered the traditional state of the country, and caused it to lose the art of government.

Though the full details of his ideas for reform are unknown, it is likely that Kitabatake sought a return to the governmental structures set down during the Taihō Era, in 702, before the rise of feudalism and military rule. He recognized that certain privileges gained by the bushi (great warrior families) and kuge (court nobility) in that time would not be relinquished, but he did seek to abolish the systems of land tenure and tax collection that supported the power of the bushi. Kitabatake viewed the bushi, and by extension the bakufu (shogunate), the military government, as enemies of the throne.

In 1339, he wrote Jinnō Shōtōki, a chronicle which relates the history of Japan through analysis of the Imperial reigns, from the earliest legendary semi-mythical emperors down to Daigō II (Emperor Go-Daigo) and his successor Murakami II (Emperor Go-Murakami). It was intended largely as a guide to the young Murakami, and as a treatise defending the Southern Court's legitimacy. It was largely written on the road, and recompiled and edited in 1343.

One of the issues it addressed was the chaotic and unbalanced distribution of land, which he blamed on the government. But he also blamed the government officials and feudal lords who claimed the land. He wrote that seeking rewards was not part of proper behavior, and that it was a warrior's place to give up land and even his life for duty. He also claimed that the chaos of feudalism was derived, ultimately, from an unlimited number of people claiming a limited amount of land.

Kitabatake's other major work, Shokugen-shō, was also written in 1339, largely from memory, as the author, under siege in his home province, was unable to perform research at Court. It described the origins and organization of governmental offices and structures, as well as the author's opinions on the promotion and appointment of officials.

== Legacy ==
Kitabatake is considered one of the greatest men of his time, along with his rival Ashikaga Takauji. Though his works are heavily colored by his personal bias and political motives, they are some of the most detailed accounts available on the history of Japan's feudal government and Imperial line.

== Honours ==
- Senior First Rank (April 2, 1908; posthumous)

== See also ==
- Kitabatake clan
- Abeno Shrine
- Tenryū-ji
- Prince Kaneyoshi, contemporary ally
