= 博雅 =

博雅, meaning 'wide, elegant', may refer to:

- Boyaa Poker Tour, a poker competition held by Boyaa Interactive
- Hiromasa, a masculine Japanese given name for Minamoto no Hiromasa (918–980)
- Poya (disambiguation), a feminine Chinese given name

== See also ==
- Boya (disambiguation)
