= Ōhōri Tsuruhime =

Japanese female warrior

Ōhōri Tsuruhime 大祝鶴姫
- Born: Ōhōri Tsuruhime (大祝鶴姫); 1526, Iyo Province
- Died: 1543, Iyo Province; Edo Castle, Musashi, Japan
- Resting place: Bunkyō, Tokyo
- Known for: Tsuruhime Densetsu
- Partner: Yasunari Ochi (fiance)
- Parent: Ōhōri Yasumochi (father)
- Relatives: Kono clan

Tsuruhime (鶴姫) or Ōhōri Tsuruhime (大祝鶴姫; 1526–1543) was a Sengoku period female warrior (Onna-musha). She was the daughter of Ōhōri Yasumochi, a chief priest of Ōyamazumi Shrine on the island of Ōmishima in Iyo Province. She went to battle several times, and her claim to divine inspiration and fighting skills has led to her being compared with Joan of Arc. Tsuruhime is one of the most recognizable female warriors in Japanese history.

== Life ==
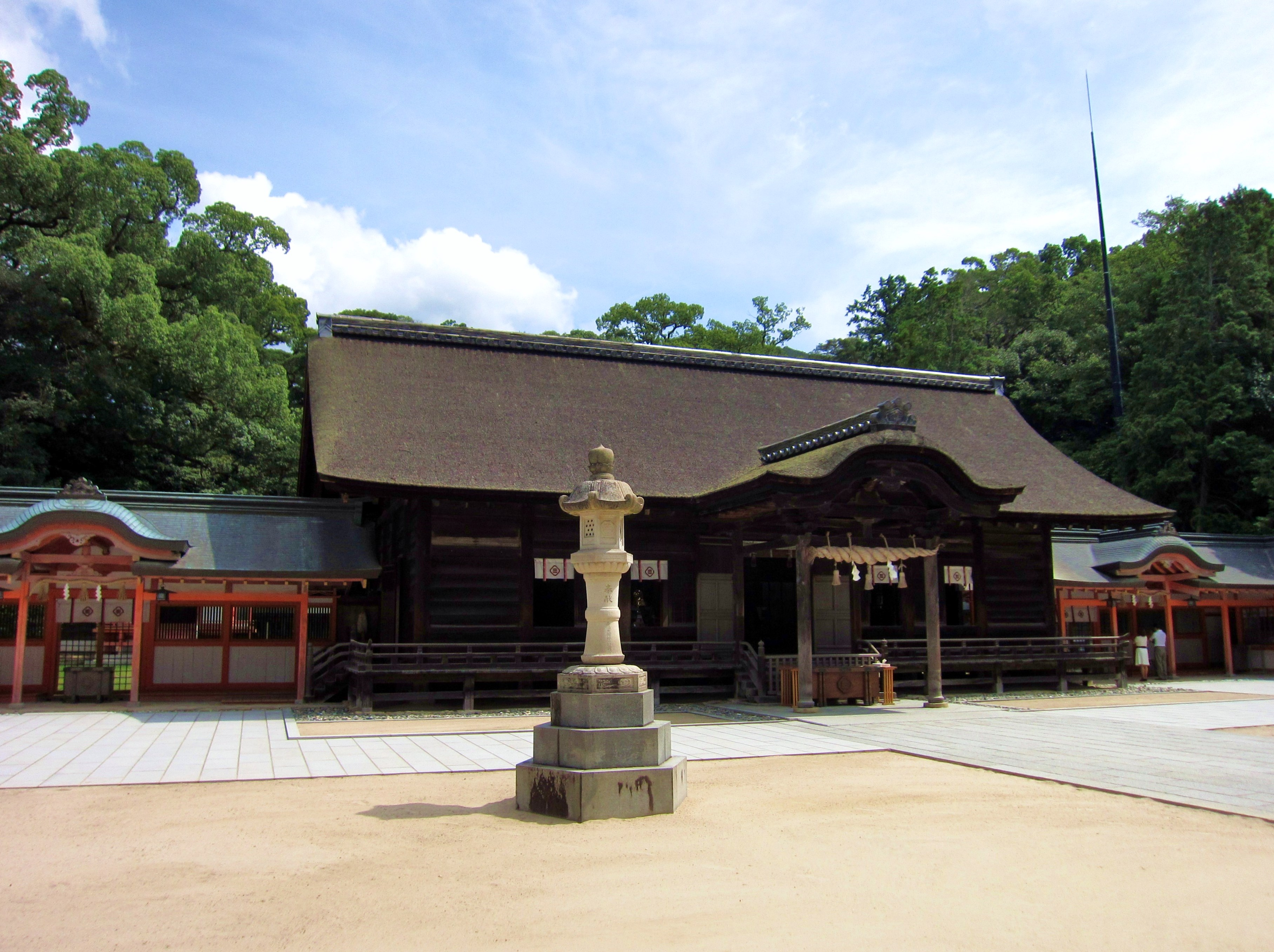
Ōyamazumi Shrine on the island of Ōmishima.

Ōhōri Tsuruhime was born in 1526. She was the third daughter of Ōhōri Yasumochi, chief priest (Kannushi) of the Ōyamazumi Shrine, on the island of Ōmishima, north of Iyo province and about 30 miles southeast of Hiroshima. The island is in the Seto Inland Sea of Japan (Setouchi). The Shinto shrine was founded in 594 and is dedicated to Ōyamatsumi, the older brother of the Japanese sun goddess Amaterasu, the god of mountains, seas and wars. The temple was a place of pilgrimage for samurai, who left weapons and armor as a sacrifice. It gradually became a museum of weaponry.

At that time the island was under threat from the growing power of Ōuchi Yoshitaka (1507–1551) from Yamaguchi on the mainland of Honshu. Yoshitaka owned the regions of Kyushu and Chūgoku. In 1534, a war broke out between the Ōuchi clan and the Kōno clan (野氏) from Shikoku, which owned the Ōyamatsumi Temple. Tsuruhime's two elder brothers were killed during the conflict. In 1541, when Tsuruhime was 15 years old, her father died of illness, and she inherited the position of chief priest. She had been trained since childhood in the martial arts, and when the Ōuchi made further attacks against Ōmishima, she led an armed resistance to defend the island. She proclaimed herself the avatar of Myojin of Mishima (三島 明 神), a powerful kami shrine. She led an army into battle and drove the Ōuchi samurai back into the sea when they raided Ōmishima in 1541.

Four months later the invaders returned. Tsuruhime led troops in a surprise counterattack on the enemy ships. While an Ōuchi general, Ohara Takakoto, was being entertained on his flagship, he came under attack by Tsuruhime in a raid. She successfully boarded general Takakoto's ship and summoned him to a duel. According to another version, Tsuruhime secretly climbed onto the ship where the Ouchi samurai were feasting. At first Takakoto mocked her presumption, but Tsuruhime won the duel and killed Takakoto. One account states that "Takakoto's disrespectful words to Tsuruhime were sharp, but not as sharp as the sword with which she stabbed him in return." This was followed by a deluge of hōrokubiya (焙烙火矢; spherical exploding bombs) from Tsuruhime's allies to destroy many ships, which drove the Ōuchi fleet away. In 1543, when Tsuruhime was seventeen, she rejoined battling the Ōuchi. Sue Harukata's fleet defeated the Kono clan's troops. Tsuruhime was overcome with grief after hearing that her fiancé, Yasunari Ochi (born in 1522), had been killed in action. Tsuruhime set up an ambush, in which she defeated Ouchi's army. According to legend, she committed suicide by drowning due to grief for her beloved. Her last words were:

As Mishima's ocean as my witness, my love shall be engraved with my name.

Though she is romanticized to have died when she was young, there are no known contemporary records that confirm it.

== Legacy ==
The Dō-maru armor kept in Ōyamazumi Shrine is considered the armor worn by Tsuruhime in battle. In 1959, the armor was included in the Lists of National Treasures of Japan. The Shrine holds festivals and processions in honor of Tsuruhime. The procession is led by a woman dressed in a Tsuruhime costume. Kyōtei boat races are held and many people attend the celebrations.

Tsuruhime became more famous among the general public by the 1966 novel Sea, Woman & Armor - Jeanne d'Arc of Setouchi (海と女と鎧―瀬戸内のジャンヌ・ダルク), written by the author Mishima Yasukiyo (三島 安精).

However, even the inhabitants of Omishima, where the novel is set, had not heard of her until the book was published. While Tsuruhime is now a major tourism attraction for Omishima, there are doubts, criticisms, and comments about her existence.

== See also ==
- Onna-musha
- Tomoe Gozen
- Hangaku Gozen
