= List of national treasures of Japan (crafts: others) =

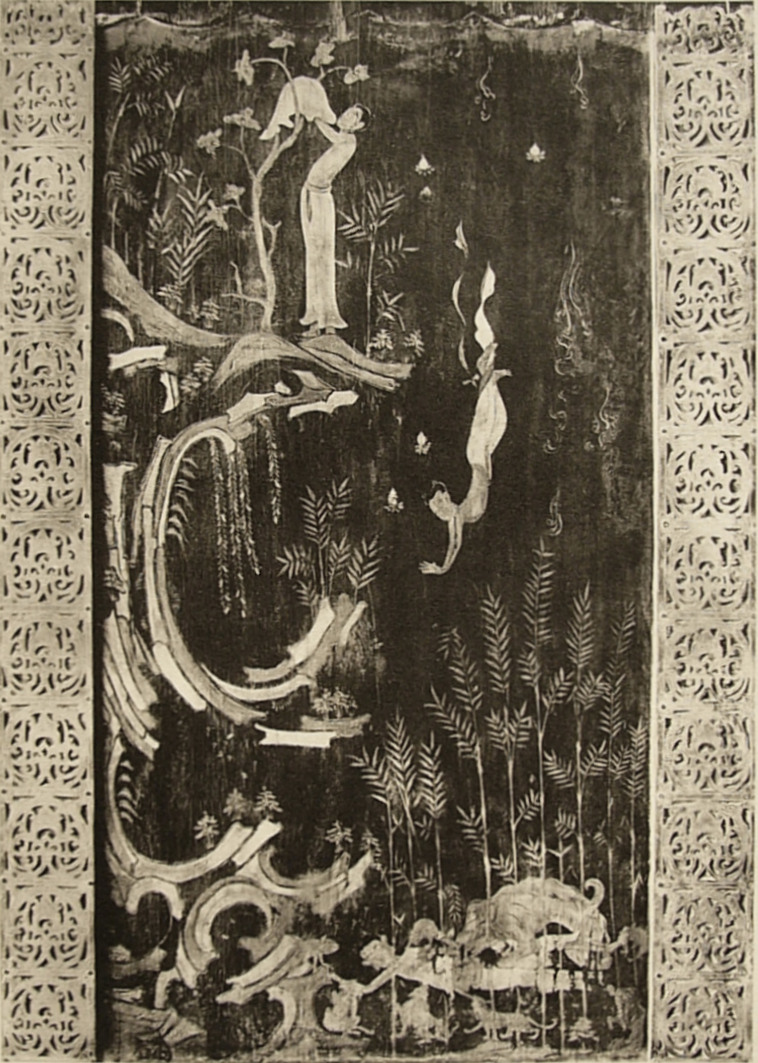
Bodhisattva giving up his life so that a tiger family can feed their cubs; illustration of a Jataka tale on the base of the Tamamushi Shrine

The term "national treasure" has been used in Japan to denote cultural properties since 1897, although the definition and the criteria have changed since the introduction of the term. The crafts items in the list adhere to the current definition and have been designated national treasures according to the Law for the Protection of Cultural Properties that came into effect on June 9, 1951.

The items are selected by the Ministry of Education, Culture, Sports, Science and Technology based on their "especially high historical or artistic value". The list presents 132 entries from Classical to early modern Japan, spanning from the 7th century Asuka to the 18th century Edo period. The number of items is higher, however, since groups of related objects have been joined as single entries. The listed objects are of many types and include household goods, objects related to Buddhism, armour and harnesses. Some of the oldest objects were imported from China at the time.

The listed items consist of materials such as wood over clay or to bronze. Often the articles were decorated using a variety of artistic techniques like gilding of precious metals, line engraving, maki-e, mother of pearl inlay or lacquer. The objects are housed in Buddhist temples, Shinto shrines or museums.

The objects in this list represent about half of the 254 national treasures in the category "crafts". They are complemented by 110 swords and 12 Japanese sword mountings national treasures of the List of national treasures of Japan (crafts: swords).

== Statistics ==
Prefecture	City	National treasures
Aichi	Nagoya	1
Akita	Daisen	1
Aomori	Hachinohe	2
Chiba	Katori	1
Ehime	Imabari	5
Fukui	Echizen	1
Fukui	Sakai	1
Fukui	Tsuruga	1
Fukuoka	Dazaifu	1
Fukuoka	Fukuoka	1
Gifu	Gifu	1
Gunma	Shibukawa	1
Hiroshima	Hatsukaichi	7
Ishikawa	Kanazawa	1
Iwate	Hiraizumi	4
Kagawa	Zentsūji	1
Kanagawa	Kamakura	5
Kyoto	Kyoto	13
Kyoto	Uji	2
Nagano	Suwa	1
Nara	Gojō	1
Nara	Ikaruga	4
Nara	Ikoma	1
Nara	Katsuragi	1
Nara	Nara	25
Nara	Sakurai	1
Ōita	Usa	1
Okayama	Okayama	1
Osaka	Fujiidera	1
Osaka	Habikino	1
Osaka	Izumi	1
Osaka	Osaka	6
Shiga	Moriyama	1
Shiga	Nagahama	1
Shiga	Ōtsu	3
Shimane	Izumo	2
Shizuoka	Atami	1
Shizuoka	Mishima	1
Tokyo	Ōme	2
Tokyo	Tokyo	20
Wakayama	Kinokawa	1
Wakayama	Kōya	1
Wakayama	Shingu	1
Yamaguchi	Hōfu	1
Yamanashi	Kōshū	1

Period (Note: Only the oldest period is counted, if a national treasure consists of items from more than one period.)	National treasures
Silla dynasty	1
Asuka period	4
Sui dynasty	1
Tang dynasty	11
Nara period	16
Heian period	50
Southern Song dynasty	7
Kamakura period	27
Yuan dynasty	1
Muromachi period	2
Nanboku-chō period	3
Joseon dynasty	1
Momoyama period	1
Edo period	6

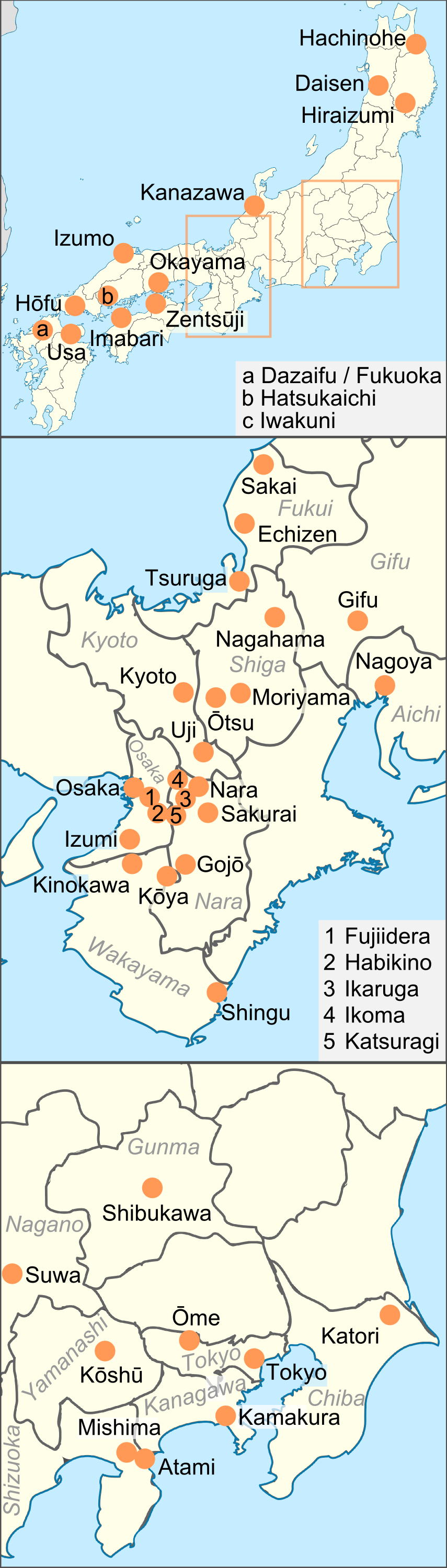
Present location of non-sword craft national treasures of Japan (Note: This includes all items in this list, that is, all craft national treasures of Japan that are neither swords nor sword mountings.)

== Usage ==
The table's columns (except for Remarks, Type and Image) are sortable pressing the arrows symbols. The following gives an overview of what is included in the table and how the sorting works. Not all tables have all of the following columns.

- Name: name as registered in the Database of National Cultural Properties
- Artist: name of the artist if known
- Remarks: additional information such as style, special materials, techniques or notable owners
- Date: period and year; the column entries sort by year. If the entry can only be dated to a time-period, they sort by the start year of that period
- Type: general nature of object, main materials and dimensions
- Present location: "temple/museum/shrine-name town-name prefecture-name"; column entries sort as "prefecture-name town-name temple/museum/shrine-name"
- Image: a picture of the item

== Treasures ==
=== Pottery ===
Japanese pottery is one of the country's oldest art forms dating to the Neolithic period, and some of the world's oldest earthenware from about 14,000 BC has been discovered in Japan. Early pottery objects were made of clay, unglazed and without ornamentation. Later, during the Jōmon, Yayoi and Kofun periods, simple patterned designs and molded ornamentations were added. Such early techniques were formed by coiling or scratching and firing pieces at low temperatures. High-fired Korean Sue ware, and with it the pottery wheel, arrived in Japan around the 6th century, marking the beginning of major technological advances imported from the mainland. Stoneware originated in Japan with the development of green-glazed and other color glazed pottery in the second half of the 7th century. The oldest item in this list is a green-glazed funerary pot from the 12th century.

The popularity of the tea ceremony among the ruling class had a significant influence on ceramic production. To satisfy the demand for high quality pottery items necessary to the tea ceremony a large number of celadon vases and tenmoku ash-glazed teabowls initially were imported from China from the mid-11th to the 16th centuries. These imported items were copied and produced locally at the Seto kiln in Owari Province. Around the mid-16th century adjacent Mino took over as a production center of conservative Chinese inspired Seto style pottery. The Japanese invasions of Korea from 1592 to 1598, and subsequent relocation of Korean potters to Kyushu, brought new pottery styles to Japan. From the late-16th century, Mino potters developed new, distinctly Japanese techniques such as Shino ware or Raku ware. This was also motivated by a general shift of tastes among teamasters and others, who came to prefer simpler unglazed tea bowls formed by hand rather than on a pottery wheel. Of the 14 pottery items in this list, eight entries are chawan bowls used in the tea ceremony, three are flower vases, one is an incense burner, one a tea-leaf jar and one a funerary pot. Eight objects originated in China, five in Japan and one in Korea.

==== Japan ====
Name	Artist	Remarks	Date	Type	Present location	Image
White Raku (楽焼白片身変茶碗, rakuyaki shirokatamigawari chawan) named Fuji-san (不二山)	Honami Kōetsu	Thought to have been a wedding present by Honami Kōetsu	Edo period, 17th century	Chawan; Raku ware; height: 8.6 cm (3.4 in), diameter: 11.5 cm (4.5 in)	Sunritz Hattori Museum of Arts, Suwa, Nagano	
Incense burner in the shape of pheasant decorated with overglaze enamels (色絵雉香炉, iroe kijikōro)	Nonomura Ninsei	Life-sized, cock pheasant shaped incense burner composed of two parts; lifelike coloration with green, navy blue, red and gold pigments; used in the tea ceremony	Edo period, 17th century	Incense burner; Kyoto-ware, polychrome overglaze (色絵, iroe); length: 48.3 centimetres (19.0 in), width: 12.5 cm (4.9 in), height: 18.1 cm (7.1 in)	Ishikawa Prefectural Museum of Art, Kanazawa, Ishikawa	
Tea-leaf jar with a design of wisteria (色絵藤花文茶壺, iroe fujihanamon chatsubo)	Nonomura Ninsei	Blooming wisteria flowers painted over a warm white glaze in enamels of red, purple, gold and silver; base is orange and has a stamp mark reading "Ninsei"; passed down in the Kyogoku family of the Marugame domain, present day Kagawa Prefecture	Edo period, 17th century	Tea-leaf jar; stoneware (Kyoto-ware) with overglaze enamels; height: 28.8 cm (11.3 in), bore diameter: 10.1 cm (4.0 in), trunk diameter: 27.3 cm (10.7 in), bottom diameter: 10.5 cm (4.1 in)	MOA Museum of Art, Atami, Shizuoka	
Tea bowl, Shino ware (志野茶碗, shino chawan) named U no hanagaki (卯花墻)	unknown	Distorted shape	Momoyama period	Chawan; thick white glaze, red scorch marks, and texture of small holes	Mitsui Memorial Museum, Tokyo	
Pot with design of autumn grasses (Akikusamon bottle) (秋草文壺, akikusamontsubo)	unknown	Discovered in the Hakusan Burial Mound; mouth bending slightly outward, bulging upper body, narrow base; covered with green glaze and drawings of autumn grasses (Japanese silver grass, melon) scratched in with a spatula; character "上" in the inside of the mouth	Heian period, second half of the 12th century	Funerary pot; Atsumi ware; height: 42 cm (17 in), diameter at neck: 16 cm (6.3 in), diameter at body 29 cm (11 in), diameter at base 14 cm (5.5 in)	Keio University, Tokyo; currently at Tokyo National Museum	

==== China, Korea ====
Name	Remarks	Date	Type	Present location	Image	
Spotted tenmoku tea bowl (曜変天目茶碗, yōhen tenmoku chawan) or Inaba tenmoku (稲葉天目)	One of four extant tea bowls in the yōhen tenmoku style (three are national treasures); passed from the Tokugawa clan to Inaba Masayasu and handed down in the Inaba clan	Southern Song, 12–13th century	Chawan; karamono (唐物), natural ash (yōhen) tenmoku glaze; height: 6.8 cm (2.7 in), mouth diameter: 12 cm (4.7 in), base diameter: 3.8 cm (1.5 in)	Seikadō Bunko Art Museum, Tokyo		
Spotted tenmoku tea bowl (曜変天目茶碗, yōhen tenmoku chawan)	One of four extant tea bowls in the yōhen tenmoku style (three are national treasures); produced in the Jian kilns in Fujian (福建省建窯) in south China	Southern Song, 12–13th century	Chawan; karamono (唐物), natural ash (yōhen) tenmoku glaze; blue and green spot marks; height: 6.8 cm (2.7 in), mouth diameter: 12.3 cm (4.8 in), base diameter: 3.8 cm (1.5 in)	Fujita Art Museum, Osaka		
Spotted tenmoku tea bowl (燿変天目茶碗, yōhen tenmoku chawan)	One of four extant tea bowls in the yōhen tenmoku style (three are national treasures)	Southern Song, 12–13th century	Chawan; karamono (唐物), natural ash (yōhen) tenmoku glaze; height: 6.6 cm (2.6 in), mouth diameter: 12.1 cm (4.8 in), base diameter: 3.8 cm (1.5 in)	Ryūkō-in (龍光院) (Daitoku-ji), Kyoto		
Tea bowl with tortoise shell pattern (玳玻天目茶碗, taihi tenmoku chawan)	Produced in the Jizhou kiln (吉州窯) in Yonghe, Ji'an County	Southern Song	Chawan; tenmoku glaze	Shōkoku-ji, Kyoto	—	
Tea bowl with silvery (oil) spots (油滴天目茶碗, yuteki tenmoku chawan)	Formerly in possession of Toyotomi Hidetsugu; later handed down in Nishi Hongan-ji, the Mitsui family and the Sakai clan	Southern Song, 12–13th century	Chawan; tenmoku glaze; diameter: 12.2 cm (4.8 in)	Museum of Oriental Ceramics, Osaka, Osaka		
Celadon turnip-bottom flower vase (青磁下蕪花生, seiji shimokabura hanaike)	Produced in the Longquan (龍泉) kiln	Southern Song, 12th century	Flower vase; celadon; height: 23.5 cm (9.3 in)	custody of Hara Museum ARC (ハラミュージアムアーク), Shibukawa, Gunma; owned by Arukansheru Foundation for the Arts (アルカンシエール美術財団, arukanshiēru bijutsu zaidan), Tokyo	—	
Celadon flower vase with Fenghuang ears (handle) (青磁鳳凰耳花生, seiji hōōmimi hanaike) or Bansei (万声)	Produced in the Longquan (龍泉) kiln	Southern Song, 13th century	Flower vase; celadon; height: 23.5 cm (9.3 in), bore diameter: 10.8 cm (4.3 in)	Kubosō Memorial Museum of Arts, Izumi, Osaka	—	
Celadon flower vase with Iron Brown Spots (飛青磁花生, tobiseiji hanaike)	Pear-shaped bottle; about 5 mm (0.20 in) of glaze at the foot has been scraped away and turned red in the fire; produced in the Longquan (龍泉) kiln; handed down through the Konoike family	Yuan dynasty, 13–14th century	Flower vase; celadon; height: 27.4 cm (10.8 in)	Museum of Oriental Ceramics, Osaka, Osaka		
Ido chawan (井戸茶碗) or Kizaemon (喜左衛門)	Name refers to Takeda Kizaemon, an Osaka merchant and former owner of the bowl; later in possession of Matsudaira Fumai; said to bring sickness and death to its owner	Joseon dynasty, 16th century	Chawan; bore diameter: 15.5 cm (6.1 in)	Kohō-an (孤篷庵), Kyoto		—

=== Metalwork ===
Bronze and iron casting were introduced to Japan from the mainland in the Yayoi period, initially bringing to Japan from Korea and China iron knives and axes, and later bronze swords, spears and mirrors. Eventually all of these and other metal objects were produced locally.

==== Mirror icons ====
Mirror icons or kyōzō (鏡像) are drawings on the surface of a mirror. They first appeared around the mid-Heian period and are a representation of honji suijaku, fusing Buddhist deities with local Shinto kami. Three early mirror icons with line engravings of various deities have been designated as national treasures.

Name	Remarks	Date	Type	Present location	Image
Mirror with engraved image of Thousand-armed Goddess of Mercy (線刻千手観音等鏡像, senkoku senjukannontō kyōzō)	Thousand-armed Goddess of Mercy surrounded by the eight legions (八部衆, hachibushū); waterfowl and butterfly on backside; shintai of Sui Shrine	late Heian period, end of the 11th century	Mirror; bronze, line engraving; diameter: 14.8 cm (5.8 in), thickness: 6.6 mm (0.26 in), weight: 520 g (18 oz)	Sui Shrine (水神社, sui jinja), Daisen, Akita	
Mirror with engraved image of Shaka Nyorai flanked by two attendants (線刻釈迦三尊等鏡像, senkoku shakasanzontō kyōzō)	Shaka image on top, Samantabhadra, Manjusri and Acala on both sides and below Shaka	Heian period, 12th century	Mirror; cupronickel, line engraving; diameter: 15.1 cm (5.9 in), weight: 777 g (27.4 oz)	Sen-oku Hakuko Kan, Kyoto	—
Cast bronze plaque with line-engraved Zaō Gongen (鋳銅刻画蔵王権現像, chūdō kokuga Zaō Gongenzō)	Zaō Gongen (蔵王権現) with 32 family members; Sanskrit characters engraved on back	Heian period, 1001	Mirror; cast bronze	Nishiarai Daishi Soji-ji, Tokyo	

==== Temple bells ====
The introduction of Buddhism to Japan in the mid-6th century led to the development of large hanging bronze bells without a clapper rung with a mallet or hanging beam. They are generally suspended in dedicated bell towers or shōrō. The oldest extant of these bells date to the late-7th century and have been designated as national treasures. The bells were either engraved or cast in relief, with outer surfaces showing vertical and horizontal relief bands, a boss ornament on the upper wall that sometimes included text, and handles typically shaped in a dragon motif. Thirteen Japanese and one Korean temple bell have been designated as national treasures.

Name	Artists	Remarks	Date	Type	Present location	Image
Temple bell (梵鐘, bonshō)	—	Handed down in the Kanzen-in (観禅院) subtemple; contains an inscription	Nara period, December 11, 727	Bell; bronze; aperture: 89.2 cm (35.1 in), height: 149.0 cm (58.7 in)	Kōfuku-ji, Nara, Nara	—
Temple bell (梵鐘, bonshō)	—	Cast for Kinseki-ji (金石寺) in Hōki Province （in Tottori Prefecture）; moved in 1653 to Izumo-taisha, then in 1889 to Tafuku-ji (多福寺), Matsubashi-ji (松林寺) in Shimane Prefecture until being dedicated in 1897 to Saikō-ji	Heian period, 839	Bell; aperture: 77.5 cm (30.5 in), height: 136.4 cm (53.7 in)	Saikō-ji (西光寺), Fukuoka, Fukuoka	—
Temple bell (梵鐘, bonshō)	—	Also called Tsurezuregusa (徒然草) or Ōjikichō (黄鐘調) (scale in gagaku, similar to Dorian mode on A) bell; fundamental frequency: 129 Hz; together with the bell at Kanzeon-ji, one of the oldest extant Japanese bells	Nara period, 698	Bell; bronze; aperture: 87 cm (34 in), height: 124 cm (49 in)	Lecture Hall (法堂, hōdō) at Myōshin-ji, Kyoto	—
Temple bell (梵鐘, bonshō)	—	Without inscription; cast in Tatara (多々良), Kasuya District, Fukuoka, Chikuzen Province using the same mold as the national treasure bell at Myōshin-ji; one of the oldest extant Japanese bells	Nara period, ca. 698	Bell; bronze; aperture: 86 cm (34 in), height: 106 cm (42 in)	Kanzeon-ji, Dazaifu, Fukuoka	
Temple bell (梵鐘, bonshō)	—	Without inscription； long and narrow shape； with cracks and Japanese Honeysuckle arabesque pattern	Nara period	Bell; bronze; aperture: 85 cm (33 in), height: 150 cm (59 in)	belfry (shōrō) at Taima-dera, Katsuragi, Nara	A bronze bell in a wooden belfry.
Temple bell (梵鐘, bonshō)	—	Without inscription; biggest bell in Japan	Nara period, 752	Bell; aperture: 271 cm (107 in), height: 385 cm (152 in), weight: 49 t (48 long tons; 54 short tons)	belfry (shōrō) at Tōdai-ji, Nara, Nara	A large bronze bell with cross design hanging in an open roofed belfry.
Temple bell (梵鐘, bonshō)	—	Dedicated by Dōkyō together with a sacred horse (神馬, shinme); contains inscription	Nara period, September 11, 770	Bell; aperture: 73.9 cm (29.1 in), height: 109.9 cm (43.3 in), width: 88.5 cm (34.8 in), thickness at aperture: 5.8 cm (2.3 in)	Tsurugi Shrine (劔神社), Echizen, Fukui	—
Temple bell (梵鐘, bonshō)	—	With inscription by Fujiwara no Toshiyuki	Heian period, August 23, 875	Bell; bronze; aperture: 80.5 cm (31.7 in), height: 148 cm (58 in)	belfry (shōrō) at Jingo-ji, Kyoto	—
Temple bell (梵鐘, bonshō)	—	With calligraphy attributed to Ono no Michikaze	Heian period, November 3, 917	Bell; bronze; diameter: 90 cm (35 in), height: 150 cm (59 in)	Eisan-ji, Gojō, Nara	
Temple bell (梵鐘, bonshō)	—	Decorated with lion, dragon, Chinese phoenix and dancing heavenly nymphs; previously located in the belfry (shōrō); one of the Three Great Bells of Japan.	Heian period, c. 11th century	Bell; aperture: 123 cm (48 in), height: 199 cm (78 in), weight: 2 t (2.0 long tons; 2.2 short tons)	Byōdō-in Museum Hōshōkan (平等院ミュージアム鳳翔館), Byōdō-in, Uji, Kyoto	
Temple bell (梵鐘, bonshō)	Mononobe Shigemitsu (物部重光)	Inscription in embossed carving by founder Lanxi Daolong; donated by Hōjō Tokiyori	Kamakura period, February 21, 1255	Bell; height: 210 cm (83 in)	belfry (shōrō) at Kenchō-ji, Kamakura, Kanagawa	
Temple bell (梵鐘, bonshō)	Mononobe Kunimitsu (物部国光)	Made by order of Hōjō Sadatoki; largest bell in Kantō; donated by Hōjō Tokiyori	Kamakura period, August 1301	Bell; height: 260 cm (100 in)	Engaku-ji, Kamakura, Kanagawa	
Temple bell (梵鐘, bonshō)	—	Initially at the west pagoda of Enryaku-ji's Hōdō-in (宝幢院); contains a three line, 24 characters inscription	Heian period, August 9, 858	Bell; aperture: 55.3 cm (21.8 in), height: 116.0 cm (45.7 in)	Sagawa Art Museum, Moriyama, Shiga	—
Korean bell (朝鮮鐘, chōsenshō)	—	Head in dragon design, body decorated with clouds and celestial beings; oldest Korean bell in Japan	Silla, March 833	Bell; aperture: 66.7 cm (26.3 in), height: 112 cm (44 in)	Treasure House at Jōgū Shrine (常宮神社, Jōgū jinja), Tsuruga, Fukui	

==== Buddhist items ====
A variety of Buddhist metal implements and objects have been designated as 19 national treasures. These include five (Note: In fact four gongs and one gong stand are national treasures. The gong associated with the gong stand is a later replacement and not part of the national treasure.) decorated bronze or copper gongs, struck with wooden sticks during Buddhist rituals, a set of flower baskets (keko) used in the Buddhist flower-scattering ritual, six pagoda shaped reliquaries, an incense burner, a sutra container, a bowl for offerings, a banner for ceremonial use, the finial of a pilgrim's staff and two sets of implements used in Esoteric Buddhism.

Name	Remarks	Date	Type	Present location	Image
Buddhist ritual gong with peacock relief (孔雀文磬, kujakumon kei)	Originally kept in Senju-dō; pair of peacock motif on both sides	Kamakura period, January 1, 1250	Gong; cast bronze gilding; shoulder width: 32.4 cm (12.8 in), chord length: 32.5 cm (12.8 in)	Jizō-in (地蔵院), Chūson-ji, Hiraizumi, Iwate	
Gilt bronze Buddhist ritual gong with hōsōge flower design (金銅宝相華文磬, kondō hōsōgemon kei)	Hōsōge flower design	late Heian period	Gong; gilt bronze, line engraving; shoulder width: 23.8 cm (9.4 in), fringe stretch: 27.0 cm (10.6 in), height: 9.5 cm (3.7 in); thickness: 0.7–0.9 cm (0.28–0.35 in)	Takidan-ji, Sakai, Fukui	
Gilt bronze Buddhist ritual gong with lotus flower design (金銅蓮花文磬, kondō rengemon kei)	Lotus flower design	Heian period	Gong; gilt bronze	Eikan-dō Zenrin-ji, Kyoto	
Buddhist ritual gong with peacock relief (孔雀文磬, kujakumon kei)	Motif of peacocks facing each other and lotus flower; contains an inscription; originally presented to Miroku-ji (弥勒寺) temple	Kamakura period, 1209	Gong	managed by Usa Shrine, Usa, Ōita; private owner	—
Buddhist ritual gong stand (華原磬, kagenkei)	In 734 placed in front of the Buddha in the Western Golden Hall; gong is fitted in a gilt bronze stand with a lion at the base and two dragons (male and female) at the top; gong had been lost and reproduced in the late 12th-early 13th century; stand is original	Tang dynasty	Gong; copper; total height: 96.0 cm (37.8 in)	Kōfuku-ji, Nara, Nara	
Gilt bronze finial of a pilgrim's staff (sistrum) (金銅錫杖頭, kondō shakujō-tō)	Decorated with Buddhist figures; front: Amida flanked by Dhrtarastra (持国天) and Virudhaka (増長天) (two of the Four Guardian Kings); back: Amida Nyorai flanked by Virupaksa (広目天) and Vaisravana (多聞天) (two of the Four Guardian Kings); probably brought to Japan from China by Kūkai	Tang dynasty	Sistrum; gilt bronze; length: 55 cm (22 in)	Zentsū-ji, Zentsūji, Kagawa	
Iron pagoda (鉄宝塔, teppōtō)	Square base with inscriptions on all sides; includes crystal Gorintō placed inside the iron pagoda	Kamakura period, November 22, 1197	Two miniature pagodas; iron and crystal; height of crystal pagoda: 14 cm (5.5 in)	Amida-ji (阿弥陀寺), Hōfu, Yamaguchi	—
Gilt copper reliquary for Buddha's ashes (金銅能作生塔, kondō nōsashōtō)	Topped by a three-sided flame and gem on a lotus pedestal; water jug shaped container with fish roe pattern (魚々子, nanako) and lotus arabesque motif in line engraving	Kamakura period	Reliquary; gilt copper, silver plating; height: 26.3 cm (10.4 in)	Chōfuku-ji (長福寺), Ikoma, Nara	
Gilt bronze bowl with hōsōge flower pattern (金銅獅子唐草文鉢, kondō shishikarakusamon)	Lion and hōsōge flower pattern; used for offerings; donated by Emperor Shōmu	Nara period, 8th century	Bowl; gilt bronze, line engraving; diameter: 27.5 cm (10.8 in), height: 14.5 cm (5.7 in)	Gokokushi-ji, Gifu, Gifu	
Flower baskets in openwork gold and silver plating (金銀鍍透彫華籠, kinginto sukashibari keko)	Plates (華籠, keko) used for the Buddhist flower-scattering rituals	Heian period (5 plates), Kamakura period (11 plates)	16 plates; openwork, gold and silver plating	Jinshō-ji (神照寺), Nagahama, Shiga	
Gilt bronze reliquary in openwork (金銅透彫舎利塔, kondō sukashibari sharitō)	Decorated with arabesque pattern, dragon, lion, peony and chrysanthemum motifs; originally used as a lantern	Kamakura period, 13th century	Reliquary; gilt bronze, openwork; height: 37 cm (15 in)	Shūhōkan (聚宝館), Saidai-ji, Nara, Nara; entrusted to Nara National Museum	
Ritual Objects of Esoteric Buddhism (密教法具, mikkyō hōgu)	Three utensils used during ritual incantation and prayer in Esoteric Buddhism: a stand for vajra pestle and bell (金剛盤, kongōban), a five-pronged bell (五鈷鈴, gokorei), a five-pronged short club (vajra) (五鈷杵, gokosho); said to have been brought to Japan from China by Kūkai; kongōban is said to be the oldest example of its kind in Japan	Heian period	Utensils; gilt bronze	Tō-ji, Kyoto	—
Reliquary (舎利容器, shari yōki)	Includes (i) a pagoda-shaped gold reliquary with tortoise base (金亀舎利塔, kinki sharitō) and lotus flower arabesque; (ii) a white glass (hu-)pot for the bones of Buddha (白瑠璃舎利壺, shiroruri shariko), with a seal of Emperor Go-Komatsu; (iii) Lace with square and round shapes (方円彩糸花網, hōensaishikamō) wrapping the glass pot; oldest extant article of its kind	Tang dynasty and Kamakura period	Reliquary set; (i) wood covered with gold sheets (tortoise), gilt copper; (ii) white glass. (iii) knitwork, colored silk thread (navy blue, brown, etc.)	Tōshōdai-ji, Nara, Nara	—
Gilt bronze ritual Objects of Esoteric Buddhism (金銅密教法具, kondō mikkyō hōgu)	Five utensils used during ritual incantation and prayer in Esoteric Buddhism: a stand for vajra pestle and bell (金剛盤, kongōban), a five-pronged bell (五鈷鈴, gokorei), a five-pronged short club (vajra) (五鈷杵, gokosho), a three-pronged pestle (三鈷杵, sankosho), a pestle with a single sharp blade at each end (独鈷杵, tokkosho)	Kamakura period	Utensils; gilt bronze; kongōban: 6.2 × 21.8 × 28.6 cm (2.4 × 8.6 × 11.3 in); gokorei: height 20.9 cm (8.2 in), aperture 9 cm (3.5 in); tokkosho: length 18.5 cm (7.3 in); sankosho: length 18.8 cm (7.4 in); gokosho: length 19.4 cm (7.6 in)	Itsukushima Shrine, Hatsukaichi, Hiroshima	
Gilt bronze sutra container (金銅経箱, kondō kyōbako)	Dedicated in 1031 to the Nyōhō-dō (如法堂) in Yokawa Valley on Mount Hiei by Empress Shōshi; decorated with auspicious floral motifs and with an inscription; excavated in the Taishō period	late Heian period	Sutra container; forged bronze; 29 × 12 × 8 cm (11 × 5 × 3 in)	Enryaku-ji, Ōtsu, Shiga	
Gilt bronze banner (金銅灌頂幡, kondō kanjōban)	Used for the Buddhist abhiseka ceremony of sprinkling water on the head of a devotee; honeysuckle arabesque, clouds, Buddhas, bodhisattvas, celestial beings and other decorations; part of the Hōryū-ji Treasures	Asuka period, 7th century	Six big and small banners; cloth covered with gilt bronze, openwork, line engraving; canopy: 65.0 cm × 65.0 cm (25.6 in × 25.6 in), body of banner: length 74.5–82.6 cm (29.3–32.5 in), width 32.7–33.5 cm (12.9–13.2 in)	The Gallery of Hōryū-ji Treasures, Tokyo National Museum, Tokyo	
Incense burner with handle in shape of magpie tail (金銅柄香炉, kondō egōrō)	With flower shaped pedestal and handle in shape of magpie tail; possibly associated with the Eastern Hall at Hōryū-ji and used by Eji (慧慈), the Buddhist master of Prince Shōtoku; part of the Hōryū-ji Treasures	Asuka period, 7th century	Incense burner; gilt brass; 39.0 cm × 10.2 cm (15.4 in × 4.0 in), diameter of censer 13.3 cm (5.2 in)	The Gallery of Hōryū-ji Treasures, Tokyo National Museum, Tokyo	
Iron pagoda (鉄宝塔, teppōtō) and containers for Buddha's bones (舎利瓶, sharihei)	Pagoda with similar shape as the gilt bronze pagoda in the same temple; containers in the shape of water jug were placed inside the iron pagoda; included in the nomination is a wooden box	Kamakura period, 1284	Miniature pagoda and five pots; iron (pagoda) and copper (pots); height of pagoda: 176 cm (69 in)	Shūhōkan (聚宝館), Saidai-ji, Nara, Nara; entrusted to Nara National Museum	—
Gilt bronze pagoda (金銅宝塔, kondō hōtō) and associated articles	Besides the gilt bronze pagoda the nomination includes: (i) gilt bronze gem-shaped reliquary (金銅宝珠形舎利塔, kondō hōjugata sharitō) placed in the lower part; (ii) gilt bronze cylindrical container (金銅筒形容器, kondō tsutsugata yōki);(iii) (赤地二重襷花文錦小袋); (iv) crystal gorintō (水晶五輪塔, suishō gorintō) with a small red brocade bag; (v) piece of textile for wrapping the crystal gorintō (水晶五輪塔（織物縫合小裹共）) placed in the upper part	Kamakura period, 1270	Height of pagoda: 91 cm (36 in)	Shūhōkan (聚宝館), Saidai-ji, Nara, Nara; entrusted to Nara National Museum	—

==== Mirrors ====
Bronze mirrors arrived to Japan from China as early as the Yayoi period and continued to be imported through the Tang dynasty (618–907). During that period mirrors cast in Japan were imitations of Chinese prototypes and subsequently Japanese designs were established. All of these mirrors were generally circular, with a polished front, and a back decorated with molded or engraved reliefs, sometimes inlaid with gold or silver. Three mirrors or sets of mirrors (Note: Two national treasures consist of one mirror each, one national treasure is a set of two mirrors.) decorated with floral and animal motifs have been designated as national treasures.

Name	Remarks	Date	Type	Present location	Image
Mirrors with sea and islands (海磯鏡, kaiki-kyō)	Dedicated to Hōryū-ji by Empress Kōmyō in 736 on the anniversary of the death of Prince Shōtoku; patterns in Chinese style on both mirrors similar: four mountainous islands around the circumference with lions, deer, birds and a seated figure and two fishermen in small boats on the sea; place of production unknown either China or Japanese copies of Chinese originals	Tang dynasty or Nara period, 8th century	Two mirrors; cast nickel; diameters: 46.5 cm (18.3 in) and 46.2 cm (18.2 in)	Tokyo National Museum, Tokyo	
Mirror with birds, animals and grape design (禽獣葡萄鏡, kinjū budōkyō)	Dedicated by Empress Kōgyoku	Tang dynasty	Cupronickel; diameter: 27 cm (11 in)	Ōyamazumi Shrine, Imabari, Ehime	
Mirror with marine animals and grape design (海獣葡萄鏡, kaijū budōkyō)	Grape arabesque pattern; handle in lion shape surrounded by various animal motifs: lion, deer, horse, giraffe, peafowl, mandarin duck, Chinese phoenix, chicken, insects	Tang dynasty	Cupronickel; diameter: 29.6 cm (11.7 in), width at edge: 2 cm (0.79 in), weight: 4,560 g (161 oz)	Katori Shrine, Katori, Chiba	

==== Others ====
Six national treasures made of metal are not covered by the above categories. They are two gilt bronze lanterns, a plaque, a pair of phoenix sculptures, a pitcher and a calligraphy set consisting of a water dropper, spoons and an ink rest.

Name	Remarks	Date	Type	Present location	Image
Dragon-head pitcher (金銀鍍龍首水瓶, kinginto ryūshu suibyō)	Lid and handle in dragon shape, body with engraved pegasus design; part of the Hōryū-ji treasures	Tang dynasty or Nara period, 7th century	Pitcher; gold- and silver-plated bronze, line engraving; body diameter: 18.9 cm (7.4 in), overall height: 49.9 cm (19.6 in)	Tokyo National Museum, Tokyo	
Gilt bronze lantern (金銅燈籠, kondō tōrō)	Originally placed in front of the South Octagonal Hall at Kōfuku-ji	Heian period, 816	Lantern; gilt bronze; height: 236 cm (93 in)	National Treasure Hall, Kōfuku-ji, Nara, Nara	—
Bronze plaque depicting Shaka delivering a sermon (銅版法華説相図, kondō hokke sessōzu)	Hexagonal three-storied pagoda in center of plaque; in top panel: Buddha triads surrounded by 1000 Buddhas; middle panel: two Buddhas on lotus seats, deities and monks; lower panel: 27 line inscription in center framed by two guardian gods; depicted is a scene from the Lotus Sutra, where Prabhutaratna resides and appears from within a "Many Treasure Pagoda"	Nara period	Plaque; bronze; 84.0 cm × 75.0 cm (33.1 in × 29.5 in)	Hase-dera, Sakurai, Nara	Relief with a pagoda in the centre surrounded by various images of deities. The lower part of the plaque bears an inscription which is framed by two deities.
Octagonal gilt bronze lantern (金銅八角燈籠, kondō hakkaku tōrō)	Decoration of bodhisattva playing musical instruments; conical jewel top	Nara period, 8th century	Lantern; gilt bronze	in front of Great Buddha Hall (大仏殿, daibutsuden), Tōdai-ji, Nara, Nara	
Gilt bronze Chinese phoenix (金銅鳳凰, kondō hōhō)	Formerly placed on both ends of the roof of the main hall (Phoenix Hall) at Byōdō-in	Heian period	Phoenix (pair); gilt plated copper	Byōdō-in, Uji, Kyoto	
Gilt bronze water dropper (pot) (金銅水注, kondō suichū), Gilt bronze spoon (金銅匙, kondō saji) and Gilt bronze sumi (ink-cake) rest (金銅墨床, kondō bokushō)	Utensils for calligraphy: (i) Water pot with oval window on each side and three legs; lid in flower-shape with jewel-shaped knob; (ii) Hexagonal pedestal-shaped rest for the ink stick; engraved with fish-egg circles; (iii) Spoons for drawing water from the pot, in the shape of a lotus flower, a gourd and a willow leaf; all items part of the Hōryū-ji treasures	Nara period or Tang dynasty, 8th century	Water dropper, three spoons, rest; gilt bronze; height: 3.8 cm (1.5 in) (sumi rest), 7.5 cm (3.0 in) (water dropper), length of spoons: 11.7–13.3 cm (4.6–5.2 in)	Tokyo National Museum, Tokyo	

=== Lacquer ===
Japanese lacquerware has a long history, back as far as the Jōmon period, because of decorative value and the quality as protective finish. Initially lacquer was used to enhance properties of utilitarian objects such as watertight drinking vessels, cooking and household goods. The oldest extant decorated item dates to the 6th century; in the medieval and early modern period lacquer was used in the manufacture of many products such as toiletry boxes, inkstone cases, eating utensils, plates, bowls, containers, furniture, saddles, stirrups or armour.

Lacquerware is produced in a three-step process: first the base is prepared. Most often the base consists of wood, but it can also be of paper or leather. Next is the application of lacquer, which hardens while drying, thereby sealing the base. Generally several layers of lacquer are applied. The lacquer is then decorated with a variety of methods. In the maki-e technique, a powdered metal (usually gold or silver) is sprinkled on the lacquer before completely hardened. This technique was developed and popular in the Heian period but continued to be used with refinements into the early modern period. Over the next centuries various other methods that employ precious metals were developed, such as the ikakeji technique originating in the Kamakura period in which a finely ground gold powder was spread in sufficient quantities to mimic solid gold. The use of metallic powders was complemented with other techniques such as polished shell inlay or gold leaf (kirikane). The former was used in the Heian and Kamakura periods and popular motifs included water, rocks, trees or flowers. Starting in the Kamakura period, larger and more solid objects such as toiletry chests were decorated with realistic images. Towards the end of the medieval period (late-16th century), simpler designs were favoured in decorations. Honami Kōetsu who lived around this time is the earliest lacquer artist known by name. Japanese lacquerwork reached its apogee in the 17th century Edo period when lacquer was used for decorative objects as well as everyday items such as combs, tables, bottle, headrests, small boxes or writing cases. The most famous artist of this time was the lacquerer painter Ogata Kōrin. He was the first to use mother of pearl and pewter in larger quantities for decorating lacquerware.

==== Buddhist items ====
Eleven items related to Buddhism, including four boxes for sutra scrolls made with a wood or leather base, two miniature shrines, one table, a jewel box, a box for a monk's robe (kesa ), a palanquin and a Buddhist platform, have been designated as lacquered Buddhist national treasures. With one exception all of these items date to the Heian period.

Name	Remarks	Date	Type	Present location	Image
Octagonal Buddhist platform with mother of pearl inlay (螺鈿八角須弥壇, raden hakkaku shumidan)	Struts decorated with bells and canopy; top and bottom with pestle and flower pattern; foliate panels (格狭間, kōzama) framed with gilt bronze border; eight Karyobinga (winged female angels) on each panel holding a percussion instrument (on front panel) or flower pots (on other panels)	Heian period	Platform; lacquered wood with mother of pearl inlay, gold and silver; height: 52.4 cm (20.6 in), diameter: 193.9 cm (76.3 in), side length : 74.5 cm (29.3 in)	Chūson-ji, Hiraizumi, Iwate	
Sutra box with maki-e hōsōge motif (宝相華蒔絵経箱, hōsōge makie kyōbako)	With arabesque pattern of hōsōge flowers	Heian period, around 1100	Sutra box; black lacquered wood, rough maki-e; 20.3 cm × 17.0 cm (8.0 in × 6.7 in)	Enryaku-ji, Ōtsu, Shiga	
Sutra Box with Lotus Arabesques (蓮唐草蒔絵経箱, hasu karakusa makie kyōbako)	Arabesque lotus flower design and butterflies in maki-e	Heian period, 12th century	Sutra box; black lacquered leather, maki-e; 31.8 × 17.6 × 12.1 cm (12.5 × 6.9 × 4.8 in)	Nara National Museum, Nara, Nara	
Kesa box (海賦蒔絵袈裟箱, kaibu makie kesabako)	Box in which a kesa brought back from Tang dynasty China by Kūkai was stored; decorated with a sea motif: marine animals (fish, birds, turtles) in gold and waves in silver maki-e	Heian period, 10th century, before 940	Kesa box; lacquered hinoki wood, togidashi (burnished) maki-e; 7.9 × 39.1 × 11.5 cm (3.1 × 15.4 × 4.5 in)	Tō-ji, Kyoto	
shitannuri raden kondōsō shariren (紫檀塗螺鈿金銅装舎利輦)	Palanquin similar to a mikoshi used in the sharie (舎利会) ceremony (dedication of the bones of Buddha)	Heian period	Palanquin; black lacquered rosewood, mother of pearl inlay	Tō-ji, Kyoto	—
Sutra box with maki-e decorations (仏功徳蒔絵経箱, butsukudoku makie kyōbako)	Box for eight scrolls of the Lotus Sutra; decorated with five scenes from the lotus sutra in maki-e	Heian period, around 1000	Sutra box; black lacquer on thin wood, gold and silver maki-e; 23.7 × 32.7 × 16.7 cm (9.3 × 12.9 × 6.6 in)	Fujita Art Museum, Osaka	
Jewel box with maki-e hōsōge motif (宝相華蒔絵宝珠箱, hōsōge makie hōjubako)	Decorated with hōsōge flowers, phoenix (chicken) and cranes on the outside and the Four Heavenly Kings inside	early Heian period	Jewel box; lacquer, maki-e	Ninna-ji, Kyoto	
Tamamushi Shrine (玉虫厨子, tamamushi no zushi; "Beetle wing Shrine")	Decorated with paintings, lotus petal mouldings and embossed figures of Buddhas	Asuka period, 7th century	Miniature shrine; camphor and cypress wood; height: 226.6 cm (89.2 in)	Hōryū-ji, Ikaruga, Nara	
Black lacquer table with mother of pearl inlay (黒漆螺鈿卓, kokushitsu radenshoku)	Incense burner, candlestick and other items were placed on this table in front of the spirit of the deceased	Heian period, mid 12th century	Table; black lacquer, mother of pearl inlay	Hōryū-ji, Ikaruga, Nara	—
Taima Mandala shrine (当麻曼荼羅厨子, taima mandara no zushi)	Decorations of lotus lake (door panels), celestial musicians (underside of roof), butterflies, ducks, cranes, pheasants, wild geese (inside); hōsōge flowers on the ceiling; used to store a Taima Mandala	Heian period	Miniature shrine; wood	Taima-dera, Nara, Nara	
Sutra box decorated with Kurikara Dragon in maki-e (倶利伽羅竜蒔絵経箱, kurikararyū makie kyōbako)	Lid decorated with Kurikara dragon flanked by two attendants: Kongara Dōji (矜羯羅童子) and Seitaka Dōji (制た迦童子)	Heian period	Sutra box; black lacquer, maki-e; 31 cm × 19 cm (12.2 in × 7.5 in)	Taima-dera, Nara, Nara	

==== Mikoshi ====
Two 12th-century lacquer-coated mikoshi, portable shrines for use in festivals of Shinto shrines have been designated as national treasures.

Name	Remarks	Date	Type	Present location
Mikoshi with gilt bronze fittings and mother of pearl inlay on chiriji maki-e ground (塵地螺鈿金銅装神輿, chiriji raden kondōsō mikoshi)	Mythical firebird (Fenghuang) on the roof; fretwork flags hanging from the corners of the roof and three fretwork mirrors and cloths on each side	Kamakura period, Kenkyū era (1190–1199)	Lacquered wood with mother of pearl pearskin (梨子地, nashiji) decoration, gilt bronze fittings	Konda Hachimangū (誉田八幡宮), Habikino, Osaka
Mikoshi with gilt bronze fittings and mother of pearl inlay on ikakeji maki-e ground (沃懸地螺鈿金銅装神輿, ikakeji raden kondōsō mikoshi)	Oldest extant Japanese mikoshi	Heian period, 12th century	Lacquered wood, gilt bronze fittings; total height: 226.0 cm (89.0 in), bay: 98.2 cm (38.7 in), shafts: 364.0 cm (143.3 in), stand width: 141.0 cm (55.5 in)	Tomobuchi Hachiman Shrine (鞆淵八幡神社, Tomobuchi Hachiman jinja), Kinokawa, Wakayama

==== Harnesses ====
Saddles were made of wood and were designed as a standing platform for archers. They were not suited for riding long distances or at high speed. Early saddles of the Nara period were of Chinese style karagura and later modified for local tastes, resulting in Japanese style saddles from the Heian period onward. Artisans and carpenters became involved in the saddle production as saddles became more elaborate in the Kamakura period, with decorations in mother of pearl inlay, gold leaf and multiple coats of lacquer. Saddles ceased to be primarily utilitarian, instead serving as adornment showing the owner's status in processions. Three Japanese style lacquered wooden saddles and a complete set of a Chinese style ritual saddle, dating to the late Heian and Kamakura periods, have been designated as national treasures.

Name	Remarks	Date	Type	Present location	Image
Saddle with oak tree and horned owl design (柏木兎螺鈿鞍, kashiwamimizuku raden kura)	Exterior of ends of saddle decorated with images of oak trees and horned owls; interior decorated with broken oak tree branches; typical saddle design of a warrior of the late Heian and Kamakura period	late Heian period, 12th century	Saddle; lacquered wood with mother of pearl inlay; height 30.0 cm (11.8 in) (saddle fork) and 35.0 cm (13.8 in) (cantle)	Eisei Bunko Museum, Tokyo	
Saddle with ivy and poem characters design (時雨螺鈿鞍, shigure raden kura)	Decorated with images of pines, vines twining around the pines and characters forming a love poem	Kamakura period	Saddle; lacquered wood with mother of pearl inlay; seat length: 43.0 cm (16.9 in), height 29.7 cm (11.7 in) (saddle fork) and 35.0 cm (13.8 in) (cantle)	Eisei Bunko Museum, Tokyo	
Saddle and stirrups with circular motifs in mother of pearl inlay (円文螺鈿鏡鞍, enmon raden no kagamikura)	Includes a saddle with stirrups, bit and swing	Kamakura period, 13th century	Saddle; lacquered wood with mother of pearl inlay; saddle: wood, lacquer, mother of pearl, and gilt copper 30.3 × 43.3 × 29.7 cm (11.9 × 17.0 × 11.7 in); stirrups: iron, lacquer, and wood 27 × 28 × 12 cm (10.6 × 11 × 4.7 in)	Musashi Mitake Shrine (武蔵御嶽神社, musashimitake jinja), Ōme, Tokyo	
Chinese-style ritual saddle (唐鞍, karakura)	Includes one saddle, one neck tassel, ten flanchards (八子, hane), a pair of stirrups, a pair of leather stirrups, one crupper (尻繋, shirigai), (Note: Strap running from the cantle of the saddle to the horse's dock.) a girth, one tail sack, two braided reins (差縄, sashinawa), (Note: Straps attached to the bit for controlling the horse.) one saddle cushion, a pair of 障泥, two ornaments (雲珠, uzu), (Note: A type of metal fittings.) a bit, a secondary rein, halter, one breastplate (胸繋, munagai) (Note: NDL: 胸繋; Straps used to secure the saddle fork in relation to the horse's breast.) and one champron (銀面, ginmen) (Note: Headpiece resting over the poll and along the nose ridge, supported by browband.)	Kamakura period	Saddle of black lacquer and mother of pearl inlay and accessories of various type	Tamukeyama Hachiman Shrine, Nara, Nara	

==== Furniture, boxes, musical instruments ====
Box-like items, including five toiletry cases, two writing boxes, four other boxes, a chest, a zither, an arm rest and a marriage trousseau containing many items of furniture, boxes and others have been designated as 15 national treasures.

Name	Artists	Remarks	Date	Type	Present location	Image
Seven-Stringed Zither (黒漆七絃琴, kokushitsu shichigenkin)	unknown	Imported from China during the Nara period; thirteen circular markers of mother of pearl, two elliptical sound-holes and rosewood fittings at the ends; ink inscription inside the body states the year and place (Jiulong County) of production	Tang dynasty, 724	Zither; paulownia wood with black lacquer and mother of pearl inlay; length: 109 cm (43 in)	Tokyo National Museum, Tokyo	
Toiletry case with cart wheels in stream (片輪車蒔絵螺鈿手箱, katawaguruma makie raden tebako)	unknown	Interior of box and lid with flying birds and floral motifs; similar design to the national treasure box with designation number 64, this box has number 99	Heian period, 12th century	Toiletry case; black lacquered wood, aogin togidashi maki-e and mother of pearl inlay, openwork silver fittings; 22.4 × 30.6 × 13.5 cm (8.8 × 12.0 × 5.3 in)	Tokyo National Museum, Tokyo	
Writing Box with Eight Bridges (八橋蒔絵螺鈿硯箱, yatsuhashi makie raden suzuribako)	Ogata Kōrin	Rectangular two-tier box with rounded corners and lid; upper tier holds inkstone and water dropper; lower tier is for paper; eight bridges design after chapter 9 of The Tales of Ise; irises and plank bridges	Edo period, 18th century	Writing box; black lacquered wood, gold, maki-e, abalone shells, silver and corroded lead strips (bridges); 27.3 × 19.7 × 14.2 cm (10.7 × 7.8 × 5.6 in)	Tokyo National Museum, Tokyo	
Writing Box with pontoon bridge (舟橋蒔絵硯箱, funahashi makie suzuribako)	Honami Kōetsu	Square box with rounded corners and a high, domed lid which fits over the body; boats lined up in a wave pattern and bridge; characters on box quote a poem (Note: On Azuma Road/Crossing the boat-bridge of Sano,/Crossing my mind/Thoughts that no one knows.) by Minamoto Hitoshi from the Gosen Wakashū	Edo period, 17th century	Writing box; black lacquered wood sprinkled with gold powder, tsukegaki technique (waves), usuniku takamakie (boats), raised characters from silver strips, bridge from thick lead strip; 24.2 × 11.8 × 22.9 cm (9.5 × 4.6 × 9.0 in)	Tokyo National Museum, Tokyo	
Toiletry case with floating thread twill motif (浮線綾螺鈿蒔絵手箱, fusenryō raden makie tebako)	unknown	Inside of the lid with drawings of flowers of the four seasons such as: plum, pine tree, wisteria, cherry and chrysanthemum	Kamakura period, 13th century	Toiletry case; lacquered wood with mother of pearl inlay and maki-e; 36.1 cm × 26.1 cm (14.2 in × 10.3 in), height: 23 cm (9.1 in) (total), 6.6 cm (2.6 in) (lid), 16.5 cm (6.5 in) (body)	Suntory Museum of Art, Tokyo	
Toiletry case with cart wheels in stream (片輪車螺鈿蒔絵手箱, katawaguruma raden makie tebako)	unknown	Used to hold such things as cosmetics, paper, and writing materials; similar design to the national treasure box with designation number 64, this box has number 99, but bigger size, higher intensity of gold color, regular placement of cart wheels and other designs	Heian period, 12th century	Toiletry case; black lacquered wood, maki-e and mother of pearl inlay; 27.3 × 35.5 × 20.9 cm (10.7 × 14.0 × 8.2 in)	Tokyo National Museum, Tokyo	—
Jinkō mokugabako (沈香木画箱)	unknown	Rectangular box	Nara period, 8th century	Box; magnolia (Magnolia obovata) wood covered with slabs of agarwood; 19.7 cm × 37.6 cm (7.8 in × 14.8 in)	Tokyo National Museum, Tokyo	
Box with butterfly design in mother of pearl inlay and maki-e (蝶螺鈿蒔絵手箱, chō raden makie tebako)	unknown	Rectangular box with butterfly and peony design	Kamakura period	Box; maki-e and mother of pearl inlay	Hatakeyama Memorial Museum of Fine Art, Tokyo	—
Lacquered inkstone case decorated with laminae of mother of pearl (籬菊螺鈿蒔絵硯箱, magakinikiku raden makie suzuri bako)	unknown	Decorations of chrysanthemum flowers, flying birds and a bamboo hedge; the case was a gift to Minamoto no Yoritomo from Emperor Go-Shirakawa	Kamakura period	Box; lacquer with maki-e decorations; 26.0 cm × 24.1 cm (10.2 in × 9.5 in)	Kamakura Museum of National Treasures (owned by Tsurugaoka Hachiman-gū), Kamakura, Kanagawa	
Toiletry case with plum blossom design (梅蒔絵手箱, ume makie tebako)	unknown	Includes 30 items	Kamakura period, 13th century	Toiletry case; maki-e	Mishima Taisha, Mishima, Shizuoka	
Marriage trousseau (婚礼調度類) (tokugawa mitsutomo fujin chiyohime shoyō (徳川光友夫人千代姫所用))	unknown	Marriage outfit of Chiyohime, wife of Tokugawa Mitsutomo and eldest daughter of Tokugawa Iemitsu; includes: 47 pieces of Hatsune shelves and 10 pieces of butterfly maki-e furniture, 5 maki-e incense boxes, two large oblong chests, two hakama, a long sword and a set of maki-e aloes wood tools	Edo period	Various	Tokugawa Art Museum, Nagoya, Aichi	
Arm rest decorated in maki-e with design of flowers and butterflies (花蝶蒔絵挾軾, kachō makie kyōshoku)	unknown	Decorated with flower and butterfly motifs	late Heian period	Arm rest; maki-e	Fujita Art Museum, Osaka	—
Box with flower and bird design (花鳥彩絵油色箱, kachō saieyushokubako)	unknown	Design of flowers and birds; red, yellow and blue colors remain	Nara period, 8th century	Box; wood colored with oil colors; 70 × 25 × 60 cm (27.6 × 9.8 × 23.6 in)	Tōdai-ji, Nara, Nara	—
Small Chinese style chest with maki-e and mother of pearl inlay (澤千鳥螺鈿蒔絵小唐櫃, sawachidori raden makie kokarabitsu)	unknown	Small legged Chinese style chest (karabitsu) with plover motifs	Heian period, 12th century	Chest; maki-e, mother of pearl	Reihōkan, Kongōbu-ji, Kōya, Wakayama	
Toiletry case with autumn field and deer design (秋野鹿蒔絵手箱, akinoshika makie tebako)	unknown	Motifs of deer (parent and child) playing in autumn fields, small birds and more; assembled of 298 pieces	Kamakura period	Toiletry case; black lacquer, maki-e, mother of pearl; 22.8 × 29.7 × 16.0 cm (9.0 × 11.7 × 6.3 in)	Izumo-taisha, Izumo, Shimane	

=== Dyeing and weaving ===
By the late 3rd century, sewing, followed later by weaving, was introduced to Japan from Korea. Early textiles were made of simple twisted cords from wisteria, mulberry, hemp or ramie fibres. Following a gift of silk clothes and silk worms from the Chinese court, the Japanese court started to support textile and silk production from the 4th century onward. Chinese and Korean weavers were encouraged to exhibit their fabrics bringing new techniques such as those used to make brocades or delicate silk gauzes. In the 8th century Nara period, Japanese weavers employed a variety of techniques such as tie-dyeing, stenciling, batik, and embroidery. They skillfully imitated continental weaves, including rich damasks, many types of brocades and chiffon-like gauzes. Because of a general change in aesthetics in the Heian period weaving and dyeing techniques became less varied with less colourful brocades, smaller patterns, and less elaborate gauzes. The Japanese aristocracy preferred plain silks over woven or dyed designs. A total of seven national treasures have been designated in the weaving and dyeing category, including: two mandalas, two monk's surplices or kesa, one brocade, one embroidery with a Buddhist motif and a set of garments presented to a shrine.

Name	Remarks	Date	Type	Present location	Image
Old sacred treasures (古神宝類, koshinpōrui)	Uwagi with phoenix on white koaoi floral scrolling plants ground in double pattern weave (白小葵地鳳凰文二重織, shirokoaoiji hōōmon futaeori), two uchiki (wide-sleeved undergarment) with triple-crane roundels on purple ground in karaori weave (紫地向鶴三盛丸文唐織, murasakiji mukaizuru mitsumori marumon karaori), usukōji saiwaibishimon ayaori (淡香地幸菱文綾織), kōchiki (wide-sleeved robe) with kamon (flower-in-nest pattern) on yellow "hail" checkered ground in double pattern weave (黄地窠霰文二重織, kiji kaniararemon futaeori).	Kamakura period, 13th century	Various woven garments	Tsurugaoka Hachiman-gū, Kamakura, Kanagawa	—
Embroidery illustrating Sakyamuni Preaching (刺繍釈迦如来説法図, shishū shaka nyorai seppōzu) or "Kajū-ji embroidery"	Preserved in Kajū-ji, Kyoto; depicts Shaka Nyorai preaching the Lotus Sutra on Griddhraj Parvat; Shaka is depicted wearing a red robe seated on a lion throne beneath a jeweled tree and canopy. He is surrounded by the ten principal disciples and lay people. Heavenly musicians and immortals riding on birds float above the clouds; probably produced in China	Nara period or Tang dynasty, early 8th century	Embroidery; embroidered silk: white plain-weave silk for the ground, French knots and chain stitch; 208 cm × 58.0 cm (81.9 in × 22.8 in)	Nara National Museum, Nara, Nara Prefecture	
Brocade with lion hunting (四騎獅子狩文錦, shiki shishi karimonkin)	Stylistically resembling western, Persian art; thought to originate in western China	Tang dynasty, 7th century	Weft brocade; 250.0 cm × 134.5 cm (98.4 in × 53.0 in)	Hōryū-ji, Ikaruga, Nara	
Taima Mandala (綴織当麻曼荼羅図, tsuzureori taima mandarazu)	Image based on Contemplation Sutra; according to legend woven by Chūjō-hime from lotus stems	Nara period, 8th century	Mandala	Taima-dera, Nara, Nara Prefecture	
Quilted seven-strip Surplice (七条刺納袈裟, shichijō shinō kesa)	Oldest clothing item in Japan as for items handed down from generation to generation; brought back by Saichō from Tang dynasty China	Tang dynasty, 8th century	Kesa; quilted, linen ground of white, navy blue, brown and other colored fibres; 132 cm × 260 cm (52 in × 102 in)	Enryaku-ji, Ōtsu, Shiga	A piece of rectangular textile with thick brown stripes tiling the surface in rectangular multi-colored pieces.
Kenda Kokushi monk's surplice (犍陀穀糸袈裟, Kenda kokushi kesa) and stole (横被, ōhi)	Brought back by Kūkai from Tang dynasty China; kenda is said to indicate its yellowish-red color and kokushi means tapestry weave; silk threads of various colors create tapestry weave pattern of clouds meant to resemble stains of funzo-e robes – the original kesa made of rags; worn by generation of elders at important ceremonies	Tang dynasty, 8th century	Kesa; dyed and woven silk; 116.8 cm × 237.0 cm (46.0 in × 93.3 in)	Tō-ji, Kyoto	
Tenjukoku Shūchō Mandala (天寿国繡帳, tenjukoku shūchō) fragments	Commissioned by Empress Suiko to commemorate Prince Shōtoku's death and likely used as part of funerary paraphernalia; depicting figures of one hundred tortoise shells bearing the names of deceased persons	Asuka period, 7th century, likely between 622 and 628	Tapestry fragments; embroidery; various sizes	Chūgū-ji, Ikaruga, Nara Prefecture	

=== Armour ===
Armour has been employed in battles in Japan since the Yayoi period. Some of the oldest extant items from the 4th to the 7th centuries were excavated from kofun and have been designated as archaeological national treasures. These ancient armours were of two types: a tight fitting solid plate cuirass (tankō) and a skirted lamellar type (keikō), both believed to be based on Chinese or Korean prototypes. This list includes more recent pieces of armour, developed as result of a trend toward (lamellar) scale armour that began in Japan in the 6th to the 7th centuries and matured in the mid-Heian period (9th to 10th centuries). Combining materials such as leather and silk with iron or steel parts, these armours had the advantage of being light, flexible, foldable and shock absorbent. They were generally lacquered to protect them from the humid climate and were used widely from the late Heian period to the mid-14th century. A complete set consisted of a helmet, mask, neck guard, throat protector, breastplate with shoulder guards, sleeve armour, skirt, greaves, shoes and a pennant attached to the back.

During this time, there were two popular kinds of armour: the ō-yoroi (lit. "great armour") with a boxlike appearance, mainly worn by high-ranking samurai on horseback, and the lighter and more flexible dō-maru that wrapped around the body and was initially worn by lower-ranking foot soldiers. The ō-yoroi was made of leather and iron lames bound together in horizontal layers, ornamented and reinforced with leather, silk and gilt metal. It originated around the 10th century but was only commonly used starting with the Genpei War at the end of the 12th century. Being the most complete and elaborate Japanese armour, it was also worn for ceremonies. The tighter fitting dō-maru, developed in the 11th century, was generally made of a combination of leather and metal and did not include a solid breastplate or sleeves. In many cases its armour plates were replaced with scales of metal, leather or whalebone laced together with silk or leather cords. Even though it was a plainer armour compared to the ō-yoroi, upper class samurai started to adopt it around 1300, as battles began to be fought on foot favouring a more comfortable suit. Three dō-maru, fifteen ō-yoroi armours and one pair of gauntlets have been designated as national treasures. Most of the items include a helmet and large sleeve protectors.

Name	Remarks	Date	Type	Present location	Image
Armour laced with red threads (赤絲威鎧, akaitōdoshi yoroi)	Helmet and large sleeves with chrysanthemum motif; also known as kiku ichimonji no yoroikabuta (菊一文字の鎧兜); nomination includes the helmet and a Chinese style chest (唐櫃, karabitsu)	late Kamakura period	Ō-yoroi	Kushibiki Hachiman-gū (櫛引八幡宮), Hachinohe, Aomori	—
Armour with white triangular-pattern thread lacing (白絲威褄取鎧, shiroitōdoshi tsumadori yoroi)	Nomination includes the helmet, cuirass, skirt and a Chinese style chest (唐櫃, karabitsu)	late Nanboku-chō period, 14th century	Ō-yoroi; iron, copper, gold, leather, lacquer, and silk; height of helmet bowl: 13.5 cm (5.3 in), cuirass height: 32.5 cm (12.8 in), skirt height: 29.5 cm (11.6 in)	Kushibiki Hachiman-gū (櫛引八幡宮), Hachinohe, Aomori	—
Armour laced with red threads (赤絲威鎧, akaitōdoshi yoroi)	Nomination includes the helmet; dedicated by Hatakeyama Shigetada in 1191	late Heian period	Ō-yoroi	Musashi Mitake Shrine (武蔵御嶽神社), Ōme, Tokyo	
Black dōmaru armour laced with leather cords (黒韋威胴丸, kuro kawaodoshi dōmaru)	Nomination includes the helmet and ōsode (大袖) (long sleeves)	Muromachi period, 15th century	Dō-maru	Kasuga-taisha, Nara, Nara	
Armour laced with red threads (赤絲威鎧, akaitōdoshi yoroi)	With bamboo, tiger, sparrow motif; nomination includes the helmet; said to have been dedicated by Minamoto no Yoshitsune; one of two similar armours at Kasuga-taisha	Kamakura period	Ō-yoroi	Kasuga-taisha, Nara, Nara	
Armour laced with red threads (赤絲威鎧, akaitōdoshi yoroi)	With plum and Japanese bush-warbler motif; nomination includes the helmet; one of two similar armours at Kasuga-taisha.	Kamakura period	Ō-yoroi	Kasuga-taisha, Nara, Nara	
Armour laced with red threads (赤絲威鎧, akaitōdoshi yoroi)	Nomination does not include the helmet; said to have been dedicated by Minamoto no Yoshitsune	Heian period	Ō-yoroi	Ōyamazumi Shrine, Imabari, Ehime	
Black dōmaru armour laced with leather cords (黒韋威矢筈札胴丸, kuro kawaodoshi yahazuzane dōmaru)	Offered by Kusunoki Masashige; nomination includes the helmet	late Nanboku-chō period	Dō-maru; laced with leather cords (kawaodoshi)	Kasuga-taisha, Nara, Nara	
Armour laced with white threads (白絲威鎧, shiroitōdoshi yoroi)	Nomination includes the helmet	late Kamakura period	Ō-yoroi	Hinomisaki Shrine, Izumo, Shimane	—
Armour with cherry-patterned leather lacing (小桜韋威鎧, kozakura kawaodoshi yoroi)	Handed down in the Takeda clan; also called tatenashi yoroi (楯無鎧; lit. "nospear cuirass" or "shieldless" or "armour that needs not shield"); nomination includes the helmet	late Heian period	Ō-yoroi; lacing pattern of cherry blossoms printed on leather (kozakura), laced with leather cords (kawaodoshi)	Kandaten Shrine (菅田天神社), Kōshū, Yamanashi	—
Red leather armour laced with leather cords (赤韋威鎧, aka kawaodoshi yoroi)	Nomination includes the helmet	late Heian period	Ō-yoroi; black lacquered iron and leather kozane (小札) (c. 1800 small scales laced together with leather cords (kawaodoshi)), metal plates for the helmet; torso height: 40 cm (16 in) (front), 44 cm (17 in) (back); circumference: 91 cm (36 in), tassets height: 27 cm (11 in), helmet height: 13.3 cm (5.2 in), diameter: 20 cm (7.9 in), large sleeves: 46 cm × 33 cm (18 in × 13 in), weight c. 25 kg (55 lb)	Okayama Prefectural Museum, Okayama, Okayama	—
Armour with cherry-patterned yellow leather lacing (小桜韋黄返威鎧, kozakura kawa kigaeshi odoshi yoroi)	Formerly belonged to Minamoto no Tametomo; nomination includes the helmet	late Heian period	Ō-yoroi	Itsukushima Shrine, Hatsukaichi, Hiroshima	
Armour laced with light light green silk braided threads (浅黄綾威鎧, asagi ayaodoshi yoroi)	Nomination includes the helmet	Kamakura period, 12th century	Ō-yoroi; black lacquered iron and leather kozane (小札) (small scales laced together)	Itsukushima Shrine, Hatsukaichi, Hiroshima	—
Armour laced with navy blue threads (紺絲威鎧, konitoodoshi yoroi)	Nomination includes the helmet; offered by Taira no Shigemori	Heian period	Ō-yoroi; black lacquered iron and leather scales (小札, kozane) laced together with a thick navy blue thread; silver plating	Itsukushima Shrine, Hatsukaichi, Hiroshima	
Black dōmaru armour laced with leather cords (黒韋威胴丸, kuro kawaodoshi dōmaru)	Nomination includes the helmet	Heian period	Dō-maru; black lacquered iron and leather scales (小札, kozane) laced together with leather cords (kawaodoshi)	Itsukushima Shrine, Hatsukaichi, Hiroshima	—
Armour laced with navy blue threads (紺絲威鎧, konitoodoshi yoroi)	Belonged to Kōno Michinobu (河野通信); nomination includes the helmet	Heian period	Ō-yoroi; scales (小札, kozane) laced together with a thick navy blue thread	Ōyamazumi Shrine, Imabari, Ehime	
Armour laced in omodaka (water plantain) pattern (沢瀉威鎧, omodaka odoshi yoroi)	Triangular lacing pattern resembling the leaves of the water plantain; nomination includes the helmet; oldest ō-yoroi armour	early Heian period	Ō-yoroi	Ōyamazumi Shrine, Imabari, Ehime	—
Armour laced with purple silk braided threads (紫綾威鎧, murasaki ayaodoshi yoroi)	Offered by Minamoto no Yoritomo; nomination does not include a helmet	Kamakura period	Ō-yoroi	Ōyamazumi Shrine, Imabari, Ehime	—
Gauntlet (籠手, kote)	Formerly in possession of Minamoto no Yoshitsune	Kamakura period, 13th century	Pair of gauntlets or armored sleeves; iron, copper, gold, silk; length of each: 66.6 cm (26.2 in)	Kasuga-taisha, Nara, Nara	

=== Others ===
There are 15 craft national treasures that do not fit in any of the above categories. Six of these are large collections of items of various type offered to shrines and two are sets of Buddhist items such as platforms, canopies or banners.

Name	Remarks	Date	Type	Present location	Image
Old sacred treasures (古神宝類, koshinpōrui)	35 items, including one red lacquer bow, 30 black lacquer arrows (one arrow shaft is missing), two quivers and two long swords both with gold maki-e in ikakeji technique inlaid with mother of pearl decorations of apricot leaves	Kamakura period	Height of quiver: 32.7 cm (12.9 in), length of long swords: 105.8 cm (41.7 in)	Kamakura Museum of National Treasures (owned by Tsurugaoka Hachiman-gū), Kamakura, Kanagawa	—
Sacred Treasures of Asuka Shrine (阿須賀神社伝来 古神宝類, asuka jinja denrai gojinpōrui)	Offers presented by worshippers to the Asuka Shrine (阿須賀神社, asuka jinja) such as robes, a headdress, boxes, fans, shoes, a clothes rack, a toiletry case and mirrors	Nanboku-chō period/Muromachi period, 14th–15th century	Various; metalworks, metalworks, lacquer, textiles, leather, wood	Kyoto National Museum, Kyoto	
Objects and Equipments in Golden Hall (中尊寺金色堂堂内具, chūsonji konjikidōdō naigu)	(i) Three canopies, (ii) a platform, (iii) three tables (螺鈿平塵案, raden hirachirian), (iv) a rack (磬架, keika), (v) three banners (金銅幡頭, kondō bantō), (vi) six garlands (金銅華鬘, kondō keman) of three types, (vii) a gong (孔雀文磬, kujaku monkei) with eight petaled flower relief and pair of peacocks	Heian period	Various; (i) lacquered wood with gold leaf stamping and eight-petaled openwork; frame diameter: 81.8 cm (32.2 in), inner circle plate diameter: 59 cm (23 in), 52 cm (20 in), 13 cm (5.1 in); (ii) height: 15.8 cm (6.2 in), 66.2 cm (26.1 in) square. (iii) mother of pearl, height: 42.7 cm (16.8 in), length: 25.1 and 25.4 cm (9.9 and 10.0 in), width: all 52.1 cm (20.5 in); (iv) 59 cm × 56 cm (23 in × 22 in); (v) gilt bronze openwork with arabesque pattern of vines; height: 90.9 cm (35.8 in), 11.6 cm (4.6 in), 9.3 cm (3.7 in), rhombus length: 29.0 and 22.4 cm (11.4 and 8.8 in); (vi) length: 29 cm (11 in), width: 33 and 57.5 cm (13.0 and 22.6 in); (vii) cast bronze; width at (top) 15.1 cm (5.9 in), (bottom) 16.9 cm (6.7 in)	Konjiki-in (金色院), Chūson-ji, Hiraizumi, Iwate	
Equipments in Sutra repository (中尊寺経蔵堂内具, chūsonji kyōzōdō naigu)	(i) Platform, (ii) table (螺鈿平塵案, raden hirachirian), (iii) rack (磬架, keika) for gong, (iv) candlestick (螺鈿平塵燈台, raden hirachiri shokudai), (v) gong (孔雀文磬, kujaku monkei)	Heian period	Various; (i) black lacquered wood with metal ornaments and mother of pear inlay; height: 15.4 cm (6.1 in), 65.4 cm (25.7 in) square; (ii) lacquered wood with mother of pearl, height×length×width: 77.6 × 34.8 × 66.3 cm (30.6 × 13.7 × 26.1 in); (iii) wood with faded mother of pearl inlay; 57.8 cm × 55.1 cm (22.8 in × 21.7 in); (iv) gold lacquer with metal ornaments and mother of pearl inlay; height: 80.9 cm (31.9 in), bottom diameter : 24.8 cm (9.8 in); (v) cast bronze; width at (top) 13.4 cm (5.3 in), (bottom) 15.4 cm (6.1 in)	Daichōju-in (大長寿院), Chūson-ji, Hiraizumi, Iwate	—
Painted fan (彩絵桧扇, saie hiōgi)	Painting in the ashide uta-e style that alludes to a poem through pictorialized kana and allegorical natural imagery forming a kind of rebus code	Heian period, late 12th century	Color and gold on wood (Japanese cypress), 30 by 45 cm (12 by 18 in),	Itsukushima Shrine, Hatsukaichi, Hiroshima	
Leather with grape arabesque pattern (葡萄唐草文染韋, budō karakusamon somekawa)	Contains also drawings of people and monks	Nara period, 8th century	Deer leather; drawings in wax and smoked in pine needles; 76.7 cm × 66.7 cm (30.2 in × 26.3 in)	Tōdai-ji, Nara, Nara	
Stylized Garlands (牛皮華鬘, gohikeman)	Originally belonged to Tō-ji; with Karyōbinga (winged female angels) motifs	Heian period, 11th century	13 ornaments and fragments; openwork cow leather, color, and cut gold leaf; height: 33.5–57.0 cm (13.2–22.4 in), width: 39.0–59.7 cm (15.4–23.5 in)	Nara National Museum, Nara, Nara	
Bamboo cabinet (竹厨子, takezushi)	Repository for sutra scrolls; part of the Hōryū-ji treasures	Nara period, 8th century	Wooden shelf board; bamboo; height: 55.1 cm (21.7 in), 40.0 cm × 75.1 cm (15.7 in × 29.6 in)	Tokyo National Museum, Tokyo	
Old sacred treasures of Itsukushima Shrine (厳島神社古神宝類, itsukushima jinja koshinpōrui)	Includes long swords with boxes, garments, three folding fans, a scepter, arrows and chests and a ceremonial leather belt (石帯, sekitai)	Heian period, 1183 (long sword box, small chest)	Various; metalworks, wood; long sword: 64 cm (25 in), arrow: 18 cm (7.1 in), sekitai: 34 cm (13 in), scepter: 34 cm (13 in), folding fan: 16 cm (6.3 in)	Treasure Hall, Itsukushima Shrine, Hatsukaichi, Hiroshima	
Old sacred treasures (本宮御料古神宝類, hongū goryō koshinpōrui)	292 items, including: a staff (幣, nusa), spears, swords, a bow, a maki-e koto, boxes, a dresser, toiletry cases, a vase, assorted trees	Heian period	Various; metalworks, lacquer, wood, pottery; maki-e koto: 153 cm (60 in) long	Kasuga-taisha, Nara, Nara	
Old sacred treasures (若宮御料古神宝類, wakamiya goryō koshinpōrui)	49 items, including: bows, a spear, cranes, crystal pearls, a koto, swords, a shō, a six-stringed zither (和琴, wagon), arrows, guardian lion-dogs, figures	Heian period, 12th century	Various; metalworks, lacquer, wood	Kasuga-taisha, Nara, Nara	—
Dadaiko (鼉太鼓)	Largest set of its type used in gagaku. It consists of a dragon drum for tōgaku and a phoenix drum for komagaku.	Kamakura period	Wood, lacquer, 658 cm (259 in) (dragon) and 645 cm (254 in) (phoenix)	Dadaiko Hall, Kasuga-taisha, Nara, Nara	—
Old sacred treasures (古神宝類, koshinpōrui)	Offers presented by worshippers to the Kumano Hayatama Taisha; includes garments, mirrors, boxes, tweezers, scissors, combs, plates, writing brushes, vases, crystal balls, bags, desks, chests, a saddle, a whip, folding fans, swords, shoes, pestles, bows and arrows, etc.	Muromachi period	Various (c. 1000 items)	Kumano Hayatama Taisha, Shingū, Wakayama	
Amulet cases (懸守, kakemamori)	Worn by women as accessory around their neck; design of: lions, shippō-hanabashi (七宝花菱) pattern, cherry-circles, cherry branches, pine tree-crane (two cases), incense burners respectively	late Heian period	Seven amulet cases	Shitennō-ji, Osaka	
Tablet (牙笏, geshaku), Round inkstone of blue and white porcelain (青白磁円硯, seihakujienken), Tortoise shell comb (玳瑁装牙櫛, taimaisōge no kushi), Small ornamental knife with rhinoceros horn handle (犀角柄刀子, saikakuetōzu), Leather belt with silver plating (銀装革帯, ginsōkakutai), Mirror with Bo Ya playing the koto (伯牙弾琴鏡, hakugadankinkyō)	Reportedly the relics of Sugawara no Michizane; despite its name the inkstone is made of white (not blue) porcelain and lacks its feet; comb with seven carved flowers and a red color from tortoise shell; mirror with eight floral patterns with a person on the left (possibly not Bo Ya) playing the koto and on the right a Chinese phoenix spreading its wings	Heian period	Various; ivory (tablet), porcelain (inkstone), ivory (comb), rhinoceros horn (knife handle) and silver fittings (around knife handle), leather with silver plating (belt), cast copper (mirror)	Dōmyōji Tenmangū, Fujiidera, Osaka	

== See also ==
- Nara Research Institute for Cultural Properties
- Tokyo Research Institute for Cultural Properties
- Independent Administrative Institution National Museum
