= Poya (disambiguation) =

Poya is a Buddhist public holiday in Sri Lanka.

Poya may also refer to:

In New Caledonia

- Poya, New Caledonia, a town
- Poya River
- AS Poya, a football club

Other meanings

- Poya people of Patagonia
- Poya Castle in Switzerland
- Poya (department store) in Taiwan
- Poya (moth), a moth genus
- Poya Pictures, American film and video production company

Given names

- Chang Po-ya (born 1942), Taiwanese politician and physician
- Miao Poya (born 1987), Taiwanese politician

== See also ==
- Boya (disambiguation)
- 博雅 (disambiguation)
