= Boya =

Boya may refer to:

- Boya, Western Australia
- Boya, Nepal
- Boya people, an ethnic group in Sudan
- Boya caste, a caste of India
- Mireia Boya Busquet (born 1979), Spanish scientist and politician
- Pierre Boya (born 1984), Cameroonian footballer
- Umin Boya (born 1978), Taiwanese aborigine writer, director and actor
- Yu Boya, ancient Chinese guqin player
- Guangya, ancient Chinese book, also called Boya

== See also ==
- Poya (disambiguation)
- 博雅 (disambiguation)
