= Poya Pictures =

American production company

- Industry: Entertainment
- Founded: 1996 as Poya Pictures, LLC in Chicago, Illinois
- Headquarters: 1645 Vine St., Hollywood, California, United States
- Key people: Adrian Fulle (Managing Member)
- Products: Motion pictures Television Production; Music Videos; Commercials; Corporate Video; Industrial video New Media
- Operating income: ▲US$ 1.2 million in 2010
- Website: poyapictures.com

Poya Pictures is a full-service production company for film, television and new media clients, based in the USA with offices in Los Angeles and Chicago. It also provides production services for international production companies and advertising agencies.

== Film ==
- Three Days (1997)
- Love 101 (2000)
- Family Tree (2000)
- The Room (2001)
- Nines (2003)
- Compton Cowboy (2004)
- Mr. Jim (2005)
- Shiloh Falls (2007)
- The Young Americans (2007)
- The Longest Nap (2007)
- The Undertaker (2007)
- Pawnless Endgame (2009)
- Women (2010)
- Drinking From The Well (2011)

== TV ==
- Hammer Time (show open) (network: A&E) (2009)
- Nip/Tuck - promo: Nip Ties - "Christian" (Network: FX) (sponsor: Quiznos) (2009)
- Nip/Tuck - promo: Nip Ties - "Kimber" (Network: FX) (sponsor: Quiznos) (2009)
- Sons Of Anarchy - promo (network: FX) (sponsor: Subway) (2009)
- Nip/Tuck promo (network: FX) (sponsor: Michelob Ultra) (2010)
- Damages - promo - episodes 302-308 (Network: FX) (sponsor: Windows 7) (2010)
- Nip/Tuck - promo (network: FX) (sponsor: Svedka Vodka) (2010)
- Justified - promo (network: FX) (sponsor: Svedka Vodka) (2010)
- Occam's Laser (pilot) (2010)
- Eating With The Stars (pilot) (2010)
- Rock The Route (client: Red Bull North America) (2010)
- Open Ice 2011 (client: Red Bull North America) (2011)
- Soundclash Project 2011 (client: Red Bull North America) (2011)
- Libido 2.0 (pilot) (2012)
- Shadow Men - Sizzle (pilot) (2012)

== Music videos ==
- "Hey Now" (artist: Tantric) (label: Warner Bros./Maverick) (2003)
- "Diablo Rojo" (Artist: Rodrigo Y Gabriela) (label: ATO Records) (*MTV Woodie Award Nominated) (2007)
- "Heaven & Hell: Live At Radio City Music Hall" (artist: Black Sabbath) (label: Rhino Records) (2007)
- "My Kind Of Beautiful" (artist: One Flew South) (label: Decca label Group / Universal Music Group) (2008)
- "Beautiful" (artist: 10 Years) (label: Universal Republic Records) (2008)
- "Discolights" (Artist: Ultrabeat Vs. Darren Styles) (label: All Around The World (UK)) (2008)
- "Lay It On The Line" (artist: Divine Brown) (label: Warner Music Canada) (2008)
- "Save Your Breath" (artist: Melisa Angelina) (label: Govanteam) (2009)
- "By The Way" (artist: Theory Of A Deadman) (label: Roadrunner) (2009)
- "Smooth Operator" (artist: Sheri) (label: Mamia Music) (2009)
- "Can't Hardly Wait" (artist: N'Dambi) (label: Concord Music Group) (2009)
- "Let's Go" (artist: Cartel) (label: Wind Up Records) (2009)
- "I Need You Now" (artist: Agnes) (label: 3 Beat / All Around The World) (2009)
- "Last Stand" (Artist: Adelitas Way) (label: Capitol / EMI Records) (2010)
- "Drifter" (artist: Skinner) (label: Evanstone) (2010)
- "10 Minutes" (artist: Inna) (label: Roton) (2010)
- "All You Need Is Now" (artist: Duran Duran) (label: Skin Divers, LLC) (2010)
- "The 5th" (artist: David Garrett) (label: Universal Music Group) (2011)
- "2All You Need Is Now - Director's Cut" (artist: Duran Duran) (label: Skin Divers, LLC) (2011)
- "Fortify" (Artist: John Shannon) (label: ObliqSound) (2012)
- "Let's Get Down" (artist: Supafly) (label: Kontor Records) (2013)

== Commercials ==
- First Kiss - Michael McDonald promo (agency: UMG) (client: Disposable Television) (2008)
- Hampster - Michael McDonald promo (agency: UMG) (client: Disposable Television) (2008)
- Playground - Michael McDonald promo (agency: UMG) (client: Disposable Television) (2008)
- High Tech World (agency: Kovel/Fuller) (client: Time Warner Cable) (2008)
- High Tech World Alt (agency: Kovel/Fuller) (client: Time Warner Cable) (2008)
- Happy (agency: McCann Erickson (RU)) (client: Lebedyansky) (2008)
- Desperate (agency: McCann Erickson (RU)) (client: Lebedyansky) (2008)
- A Better Way (film) (agency: InNirvana) (client: Dr. Linder Products) (2010)
- DR 1 (agency: InNirvana) (client: Dr. Linder Products) (2010)
- Olympics promos - Nadia Comenici (agency: Thackwell & Whittaker) (client: Super Sport, Int.) (2012) **PromaxBDA Silver Award for Sports Media
- Olympics promos - Mark Spitz (agency: Thackwell & Whittaker) (client: Super Sport, Int.) (2012) **PromaxBDA Silver Award for Sports Media
- Olympics promos - Kirsty Coventry (agency: Thackwell & Whittaker) (client: Super Sport, Int.) (2012)
- Ultimate Combos - 1-3 (agency: Kovel-Fuller) (client: Sizzler) (2012)
- All American BBQ (agency: Kovel-Fuller) (client: Sizzler) (2012)
- Mercury Mission 1-7 (agency: Kovel-Fuller) (client: Mercury Insurance) (2013)
- Salad Bar (agency: Kovel-Fuller) (client: Sizzler) (2013)
- A Century Of Service (agency: Digital Kitchen) (client: The Midnight Mission) (2013)

== Industrials and new media ==
- WH Linen (client: WH Linen) (2004)
- Love 101 - 10 Years Later (client: DivX.com) (2007)
- Most Amazing School Hookups (client: DivX.com) (2007)
- Campbell's (agency: Model People Inc) (2007)
- Ubisoft (agency: Model People Inc) (2007)
- Phoenix Books (agency: RW Media) (2008)
- Coty Fragrances Int / Playboy (agency: J. Walter Thompson Agency) (2008)
- Finding Peace (client: The Prem Rawat Foundation) (2008)
- Mascot Challenge (client: Capital One) (2008)
- DVD Presentation (client: RL Leaders) (2009)
- Summary Video (client: RL Leaders) (2009)
- Military 3 (client: RL Leaders) (2010)
- Burlesque To Broadway (client: CAMA) (2010)
- Rock The Route - webseries (client: Red Bull North America) (2010)
- Open Ice 2011 - webisode (client: Red Bull North America) (2011)
- Soundclash Project 2011 -webisode (client: Red Bull North America) (2011)
- The Training Brain (client: RL Leaders / US Army) (2011)
- Red Bull Music Academy World Tour 2011 - Motor City Frequencies - webisode (client: Red Bull North America) (2011)
- Red Bull Music Academy World Tour 2011 - Motor City Frequencies - lecture series (client: Red Bull North America) (2011)
- 2011 Wine, Food & Jazz Fest - webclip (client: Rotary International) (2011)
- Thanksgiving Celebration - webclip (client: The Midnight Mission) (2011)
- Nawruz Celebration - webclip (client: The Midnight Mission) (2012)
- The Golden Heart Awards - support videos (client: The Midnight Mission) (2012)
- COIC Video (client: RL Leaders / US Army) (2012)
- Charity Golf Tourney (client: The Midnight Mission) (2012)
- Quantum - live action footage (client: Gamecentric Media) (2012)
- 2012 Wine, Food & Jazz Fest - webclip (client: Rotary International) (2012)
- Vox Influx (client: Social Research, Inc) (2014)
- NOAH China promo 1 - Darren Arronofsky (client: Paramount Pictures Global) (2014)
- NOAH China promo 2 - Ray Winstone (client: Paramount Pictures Global) (2014)
- NOAH China promo 3 - Emma Stone (client: Paramount Pictures Global) (2014)
- NOAH China promo 4 - Anthony Hopkins (client: Paramount Pictures Global) (2014)
- TRANSFORMERS 4: AGE OF EXTINCTION China promo 1 (client: Paramount Pictures Global) (2014)
- TRANSFORMERS 4: AGE OF EXTINCTION China promo 2 - Li Bingbing (client: Paramount Pictures Global) (2014)
- TRANSFORMERS 4: AGE OF EXTINCTION China promo 3 - Han Geng (client: Paramount Pictures Global) (2014)
- TRANSFORMERS 4: AGE OF EXTINCTION China promo 4 (client: Paramount Pictures Global) (2014)
- TRANSFORMERS 4: AGE OF EXTINCTION Newswrap Hong Kong premiere (client: Paramount Pictures Global) (2014)
- TRANSFORMERS 4: AGE OF EXTINCTION Newswrap Shanghai premiere (client: Paramount Pictures Global) (2014)
- TRANSFORMERS 4: AGE OF EXTINCTION Newswrap Beijing premiere (client: Paramount Pictures Global) (2014)
