= Love 101 =

- Directed by: Adrian Fulle
- Written by: Adrian Fulle; David Miller; Daniel Bingley
- Produced by: Poya Pictures
- Starring: Michael Muhney; Jeff Anderson; Mary Kay Cook
- Release date: February 14, 2000
- Running time: 86 mins
- Country: United States
- Language: English

Love 101 is a 2000 comedy film that was directed by Adrian Fulle. The movie first released to theaters on February 14, 2000 and stars Michael Muhney and Jeff Anderson as two college students that find their friendship threatened by the introduction of a new girl.

== Cast ==
- Michael Mulhaney as Andrew
- Mary Kay Cook as Shayna
- Joe Collins as Joe
- Jimmy Slonina as Tad
- Heidi Mokryci as Elke
- Jeff Anderson as Phil
- Will Carpenter as Steve
- Kim Wade as Jean
- Tiffany Paulsen as Liz
- Brad Nelson as Tom
- Gary Houston as Professor
- Monica Payne as Martha
- Amy Ludwig as Physics Professor
- Dan Bigley as Eduardo’s Host

== Synopsis ==
Over Thanksgiving break, while his roommate is away from campus, pretty boy Andrew (Michael Muhney) sleeps with Shayna (Mary Kay Cook), his roommate Joe's (Jim Slonina) dream girl. When Shayna starts a relationship with Joe, attempting to make Andrew jealous, it causes a rift in the boys' friendship.

== Reception ==
The A.V. Club panned Love 101 and commented that it was "paced like a cement mixer, and while the actors move through the paces of some tired gags between moments of self-reflection, you might find yourself studying the wall decorations." Scott Weinberg of eFilmCritic.com also criticized the film as they felt that it got "Points for trying, but this flick gets its inspirations from movies not all that hot to begin with, and then simply rehashes them point by point." The Daily Herald gave a more positive review, stating that "What "Love 101" and its virtual all-Chicagoland cast lack in polish, they make up for with a generous supply of sincerity."
