= Dō-maru =

Type of Japanese armour

External image
- Photos and drawings of a dō-maru

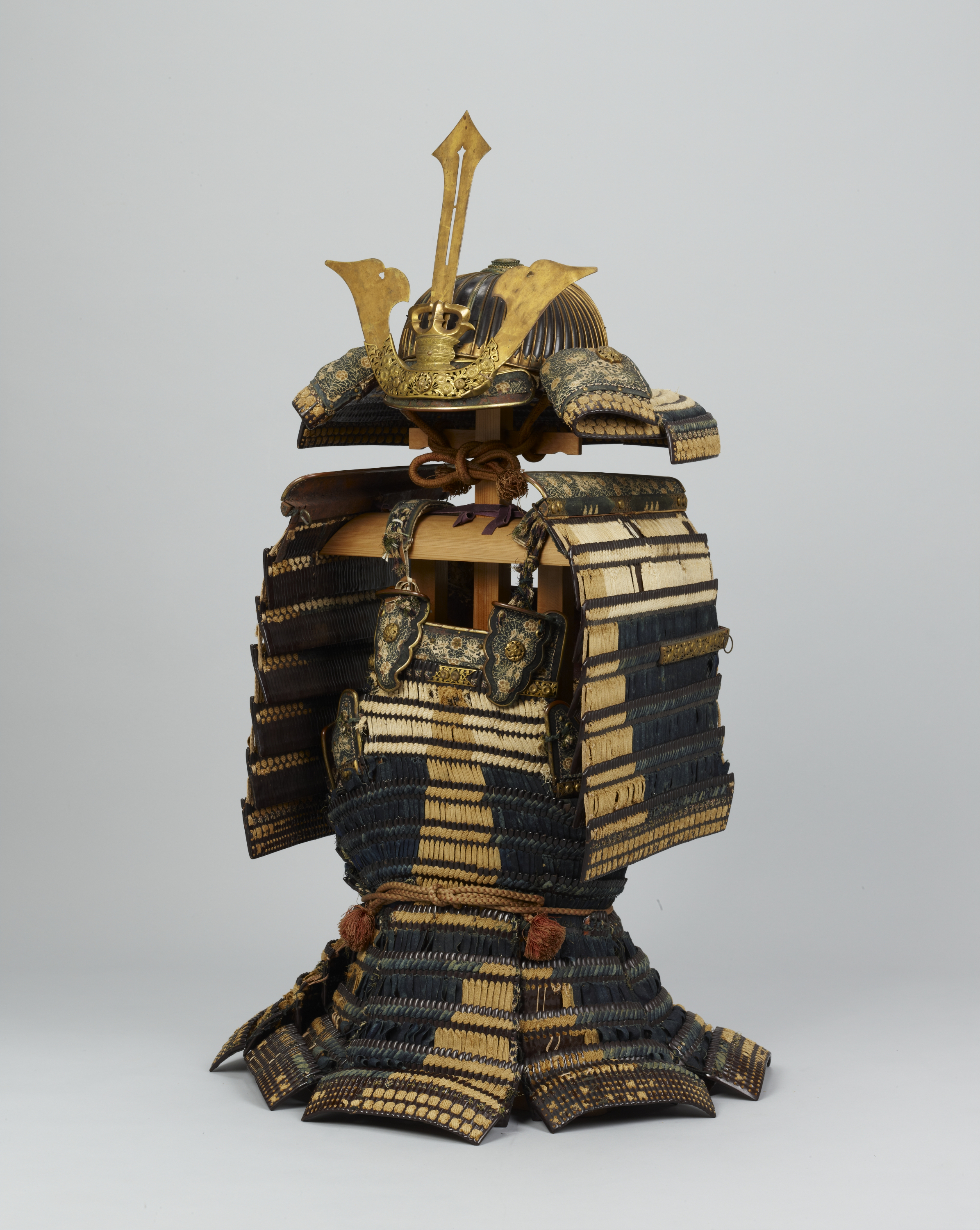
Dōmaru with Black and White Lacing. Muromachi period, 15th century, Tokyo National Museum, Important Cultural Property

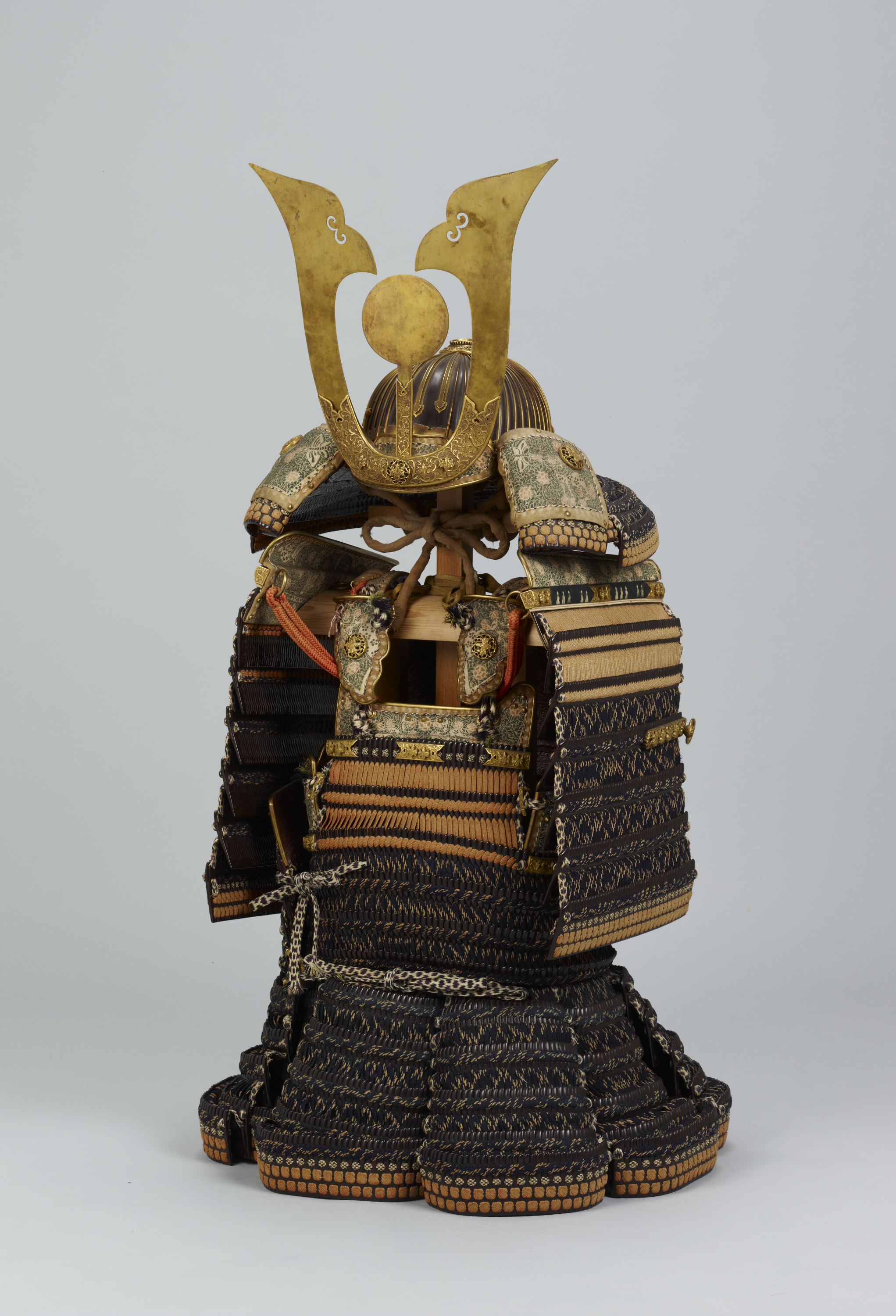
Dōmaru with “Eurasian Jay” Lacing, Red at the Top. Muromachi period, 15th century, Tokyo National Museum, Important Cultural Property

Dō-maru (胴丸), or "body wrap", is a type of chest armour (dou or dō) that was worn by the samurai class of feudal Japan. Dō-maru first appeared in the 11th century, as an armour for lesser samurai and retainers. Like the ō-yoroi style it became more common in the Genpei War at the end of the 12th century.

== Description ==
There were quite a number of similar styles and types of Japanese armor; the dō-maru is particularly defined by the fact that a dō-maru opens on the right side as opposed to the haramaki style, which opens in the back, and the ō-yoroi, the cuirass of which is completely open on the right side, requiring a separate plate (waidate) to cover the right side. The ō-yoroi is a heavy, box-like type of armour meant for use on horseback, and was expensive to make. The dō-maru, like the haramaki, has more skirt plates (kusazuri) than an ō-yoroi and is lighter, closer-fitting, and cheaper to create. The dō-maru was easier to fight with on foot and eventually even higher status samurai adopted it over the ō-yoroi.

Dō-maru were constructed from small scales of leather or metal laced into plates with cord and lacquered, then each plate was laced together to form the armor. Due to the weight of iron, armour makers limited its use to the most vital parts of the armor and used leather for the remainder.

== See also ==
- List of National Treasures of Japan (crafts: others)
