= Adrian Fulle =

American writer, director and producer (born 1972)

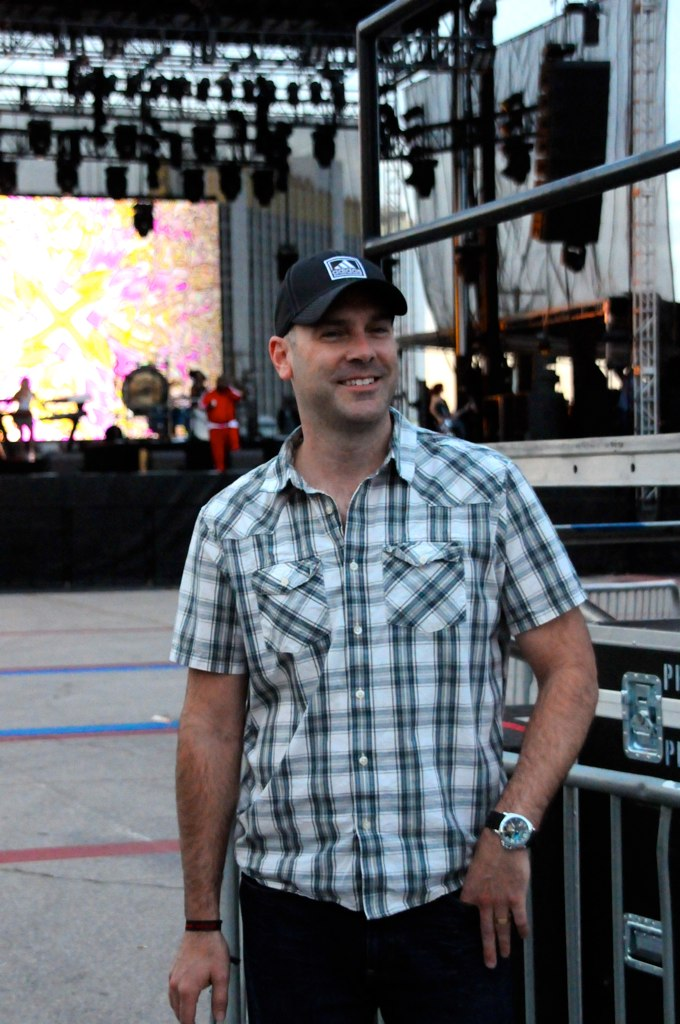
- Born: April 25, 1972 (age 54); Des Plaines, Illinois, U.S.
- Occupations: Director, producer
- Known for: Love 101
- Spouse: Cecilia
- Children: Olivia

Adrian Fulle (born April 25, 1972) is an American writer, director and producer. He graduated from Columbia College, Chicago with a BA in Film and Video and first worked for The Walt Disney Company. Among others, he has produced work for companies such as Amazon Studios, Warner Bros., Sony, Intel, Adobe and DTS.

== Filmography ==
=== Film ===
- The Ride (1996)
- Three Days (1997)
- Love 101 (2000)
- Family Tree (2000)
- The Room (2001)
- Nines (2003)
- Compton Cowboy (2004)
- Mr. Jim (2005)
- Finding Preet (2005)
- Shiloh Falls (2007)
- The Young Americans (2007)
- The Longest Nap (2007)
- The Undertaker (2007)
- Pawnless Endgame (2009)
- The Brazen Bull (2010)
- Women (2010)
- Drinking From The Well (2011)
- Unknown Project (2013)
- Choose Your Weapon (2014)
- Intermission (2014)
- Crossroads: Choices & Consequences (2015)
- Media Wars (video game) (2015)

=== Television ===
- Power Play (2004)
- Vox Influx (2014)
