= Hiromasa =

- Gender: Male

Origin
- Origin: Japanese
- Meaning: Different meanings depending on the kanji used

Hiromasa (written: 博正, 宏昌, 弘昌, 弘将, 浩正, 大将 or 太将) is a masculine Japanese given name. Notable people with the name include:

- Hiromasa Arai (born 1952), Japanese baseball player
- Hiromasa Azuma (吾妻 弘将; born 1977), Japanese footballer
- Hiromasa Ezoe (1936–2013), Japanese industrialist
- Hiromasa Funabasama (born 1996), Japanese baseball player
- Hiromasa Fujimori (藤森 太将; born 1991), Japanese swimmer
- Hiromasa Ijichi (伊秩 弘将; born 1963), Japanese composer and music producer
- Hiromasa Kanazawa (金澤 大将; born 1983), Japanese footballer
- Minamoto no Hiromasa (源 博雅; 918–980), Japanese noble and musician
- Hiromasa Nakano (born 1978), Japanese politician
- Hiromasa Ochiai (born 1994), Japanese field hockey player
- Hiromasa Ougikubo (born 1987), Japanese mixed martial artist
- Hiromasa Suguri (村主 博正; born 1976), Japanese footballer
- Hiromasa Tanaka (田中 宏昌; born 1981), Japanese decathlete
- Hiromasa Tokioka (時岡 宏昌; born 1974), Japanese footballer
- Hiromasa Yamamoto (山本 浩正; born 1979), Japanese footballer
- Hiromasa Yonebayashi (米林 宏昌; born 1973), Japanese animator and director
- Hiromasa Yonekura (米倉 弘昌; born 1937), Japanese businessman
