= Boyaa Poker Tour =

Chinese poker competition

Boyaa Poker Tour (BPT; simplified Chinese: 博雅国际扑克大赛; traditional Chinese: 博雅國際撲克大賽) is a poker competition held by Boyaa Interactive. BPT covers five divisions like mainland China, Hong Kong, Macau and Taiwan, Southeast Asia, the Middle East and Europe. NetEase said in 2018 that the BPT events held in the prior three years "attracted hundreds of players from dozens of countries around the world to participate, which has a certain international influence".

== History ==
- BPT 2015 was held in Macau on September 25, 2015. Hosted at The Venetian Macao, it was co-organised by Boyaa and Poker King Club. The reward of this competition was 500,000 dollars. The player Mai Jie who came from mainland Chinese elimination area won the BPT global championship. 1% of the tournament reward was donated to Bishop Mountain Children Center, a charity organization in Macau.
- BPT 2016 Macau was held at The Venetian Macao on October 24, 2016. The reward was 4,000,000 HKD and 35,000,000,000 online game chips. Ye Lang who came from Hong Kong won the global championship of BPT 2016 competition.
- BPT 2016 Sanya was held in Hainan province on December 9, 2016. Boyaa Interactive cooperated with Sanya VISUN Group to set up Sanya station. The prize pool was 38,800,000 RMB and 23,800,000,000 online game chips. Bao Jun who came from Beijing won the championship of BPT 2016 Sanya.
- BPT 2017 Hanoi was successfully held in Vietnam on June 17, 2017, and was organized by Boyaa Interactive and Vietnam poker club—Win Poker Club. The prize pool of this tournament was 25,000,000,000 VND. Player Tinth Anh Dung, the championship who won reward of 75,180,000 VND, also got the invitation for BPT 2017 Macau Final!
