= Ōyamazumi Shrine =

Shinto shrine in Ehime Prefecture, Japan

- 大山祇神社
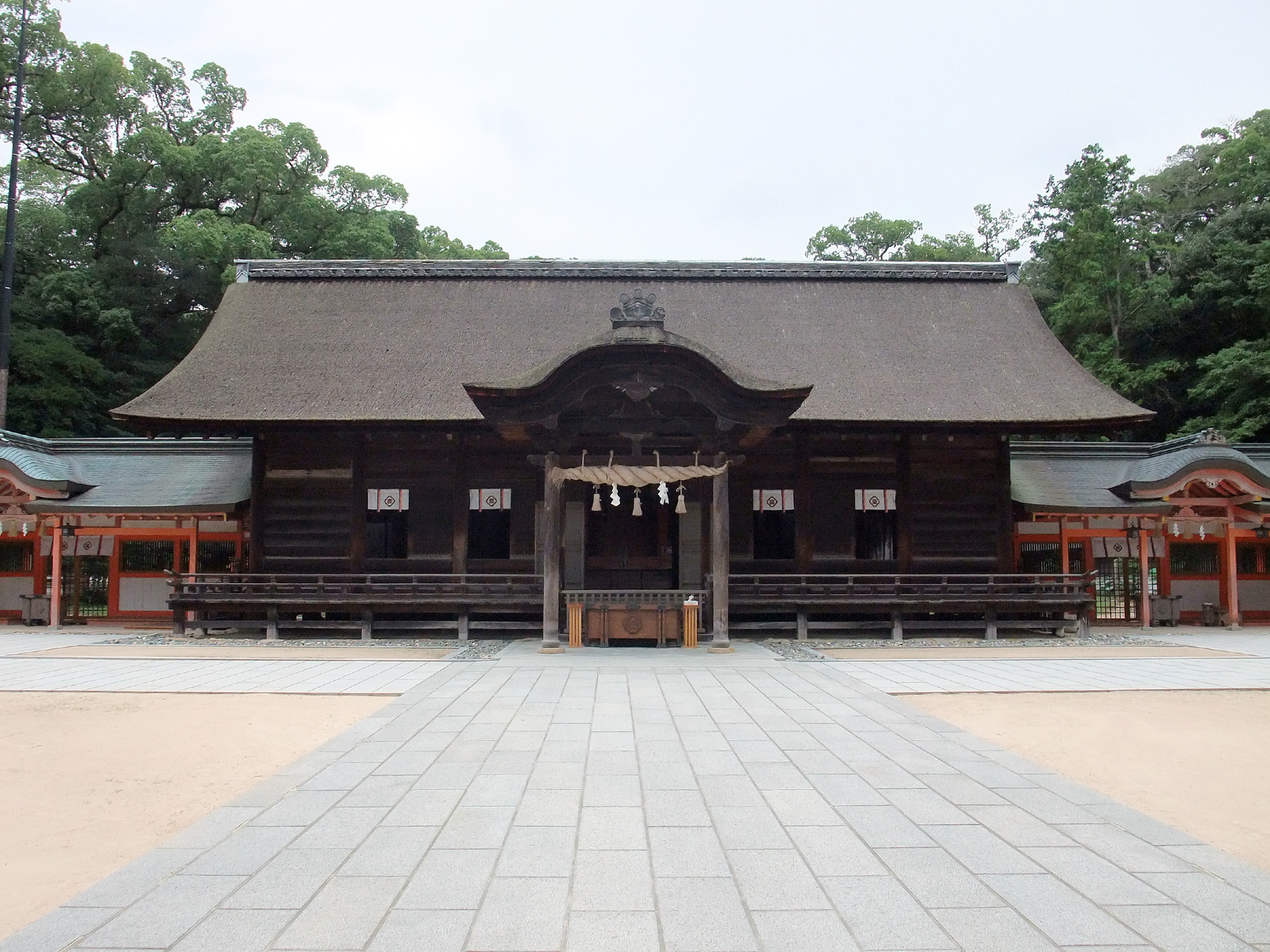
- Haiden at Ōyamazumi Shrine

- Ōyamazumi Jinja Ōyamazumi Shrine (Japan)

Religion
- Affiliation: Shinto
- Deity: Ōyamatsumi
- Festival: April 22

Location
- Location: 3327 Miyaura, Omishima-cho, Imabari-shi, Ehime-ken 794-1393
- Interactive map of Ōyamazumi Shrine
- Coordinates: 34°14′52.45″N 133°0′20.9″E

Website
- Official website

Ōyamazumi Shrine (大山祇神社, Ōyamazumi-jinja) is a Shinto shrine located on the island of Ōmishima in the Seto Inland Sea. Administratively, it is part of the city of Imabari, Ehime Prefecture. It was the ichinomiya shrine of former Iyo Province. The main festival of the shrine is held annually on the April 22 by the lunar calendar.

== Enshrined kami ==
The primary kami enshrined at Ōyamazumi Jinja is:

- Ōyamatsumi (大山積神), a god of mountains, sea, and war in Japanese mythology, and the elder brother of Amaterasu and Susanoo.

== History ==
Located on the west coast of Ōmishima Island, the shrine is situated at the western foot of the island's highest peak, Mt. Washigatou (436.5 meters), which is considered a sacred mountain. The shrine is in a grove of camphor trees, the oldest of which are between 2,600 and 3,000 years old. The origins of the shrine are unknown. Archaeological excavations have found evidence that the island was a ritual location in the Yayoi period, and unverifiable legends state that the worship of Ōyamatsumi came from Baekje on the Korean Peninsula and came to Japan from the Japanese domination of Mimana under Emperor Nintoku. Per the Izumi-no-kuni fudoki, the first shrine was established in Settsu Province and was relocated to Iyo Province by Emperor Suiko in 594. In 701, the shrine was relocated to its present site, with construction competed in 716 and a dedication ceremony held in 719. The shrine first appears in the historical record in an entry in the Shoku Nihongi dated 766, and appears regularly in the subsequent national histories of the Heian period (such as the Shoku Nihon Kōki and Nihon Sandai Jitsuroku), rising steadily in official rank. In the 927 Engishiki, it is listed as a Myōjin Taisha (名神大社) and the ichinomiya of the province. It was also given the title of Nihon Sochinju (日本総鎮守) , or "Protector shrine of Japan". The shrine has been supported by successive imperial courts and warlords, especially by members of the Taira and Minamoto clans, who made it a practice to donate swords and armor to the shrine as votive offerings for success and protection in battle. Due to this practice, the shrine has an enormous collection of weaponry, estimated by some to include approximately 40% of Japan's arms and armor designated as either a National Treasure or an Important Cultural Property, including eight National Treasures and 76 Important Cultural Properties (as of 2014).

The Honden and Haiden of the shrine were destroyed by fire in 1322 and rebuilt in 1427. Both structures are designated as Important Cultural Properties.

The priesthood of the Ōyamazumi Shrine was hereditary to the Ochi clan, who had been the Kuni no miyatsuko of Iyo since the Kofun period. During the Edo Period, the shrine gained in popularity as an unnumbered stop on the Shikoku pilgrimage. Following the Meiji Restoration, with the establishment of State Shinto the shrine was classified as a National shrine,1st rank (国幣大社, Kokuhei Taisha), and was the highest ranking shrine in the Shikoku region. During the American occupation of Japan following World War II, some 10,000 pieces of weaponry and armor were relocated to the shrine under the pretext of being dedicated as sacred objects from the Imperial Japanese Naval Academy and Itsukushima Shrine by authorities who feared that they would be confiscated. The GHQ authorities were disturbed by the vast number of swords, and ordered the disposal of all items except those which had already been designated as National Treasures. The shrine authorities responded by secretly burying them and later, after the end of the occupation and the establishment of the Japan Self-Defense Forces, they returned the swords to the Japanese government.

In 1992, the shrine suffered from an arson attack by leftist extremists of the Chūkaku-ha who saw the shrine as a symbol of Japanese imperialism.

The shrine is located seven kilometers from the Omishima IC on the Nishiseto Expressway (Shimanami Kaidō)

== Gallery ==
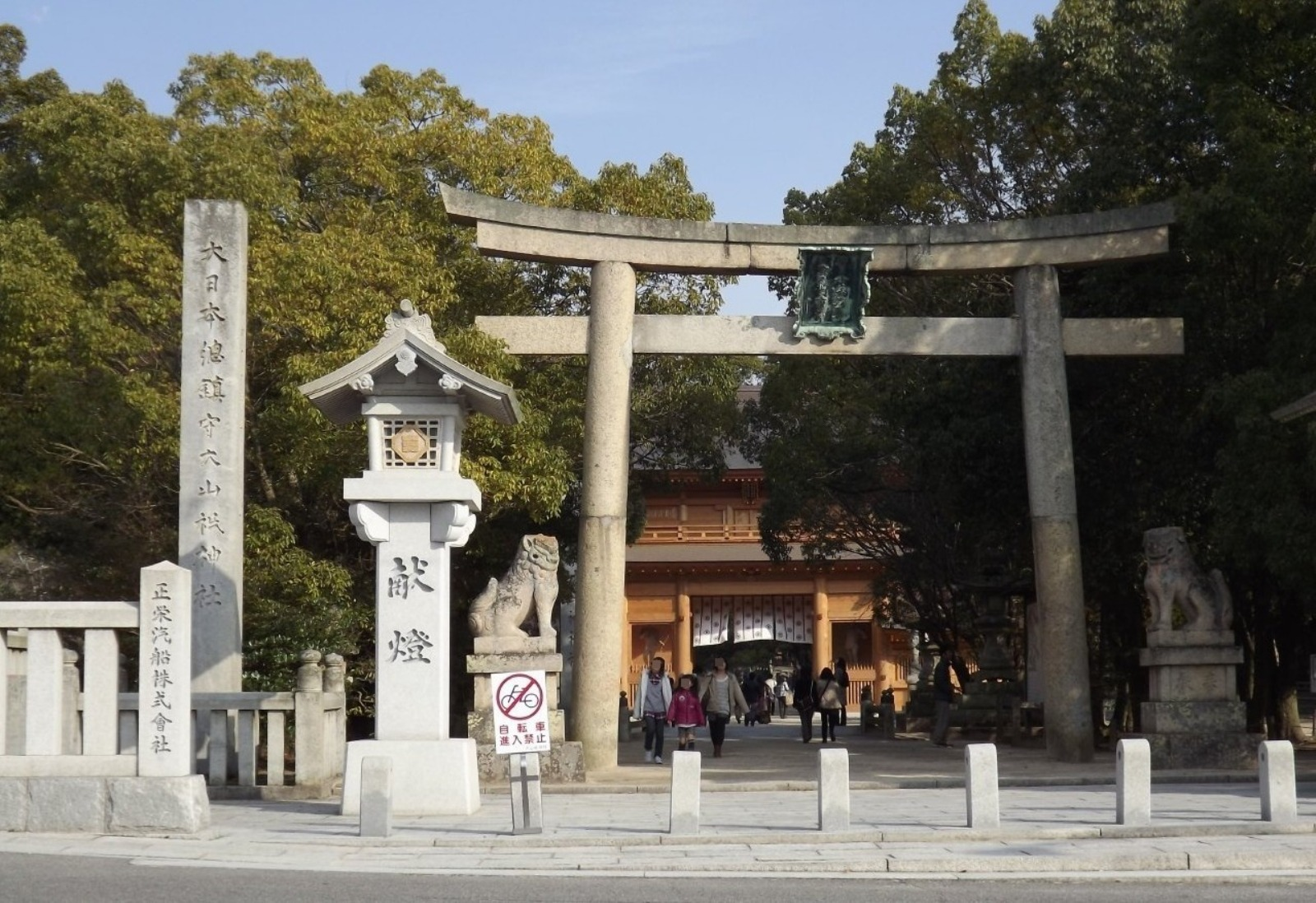
Second Torii

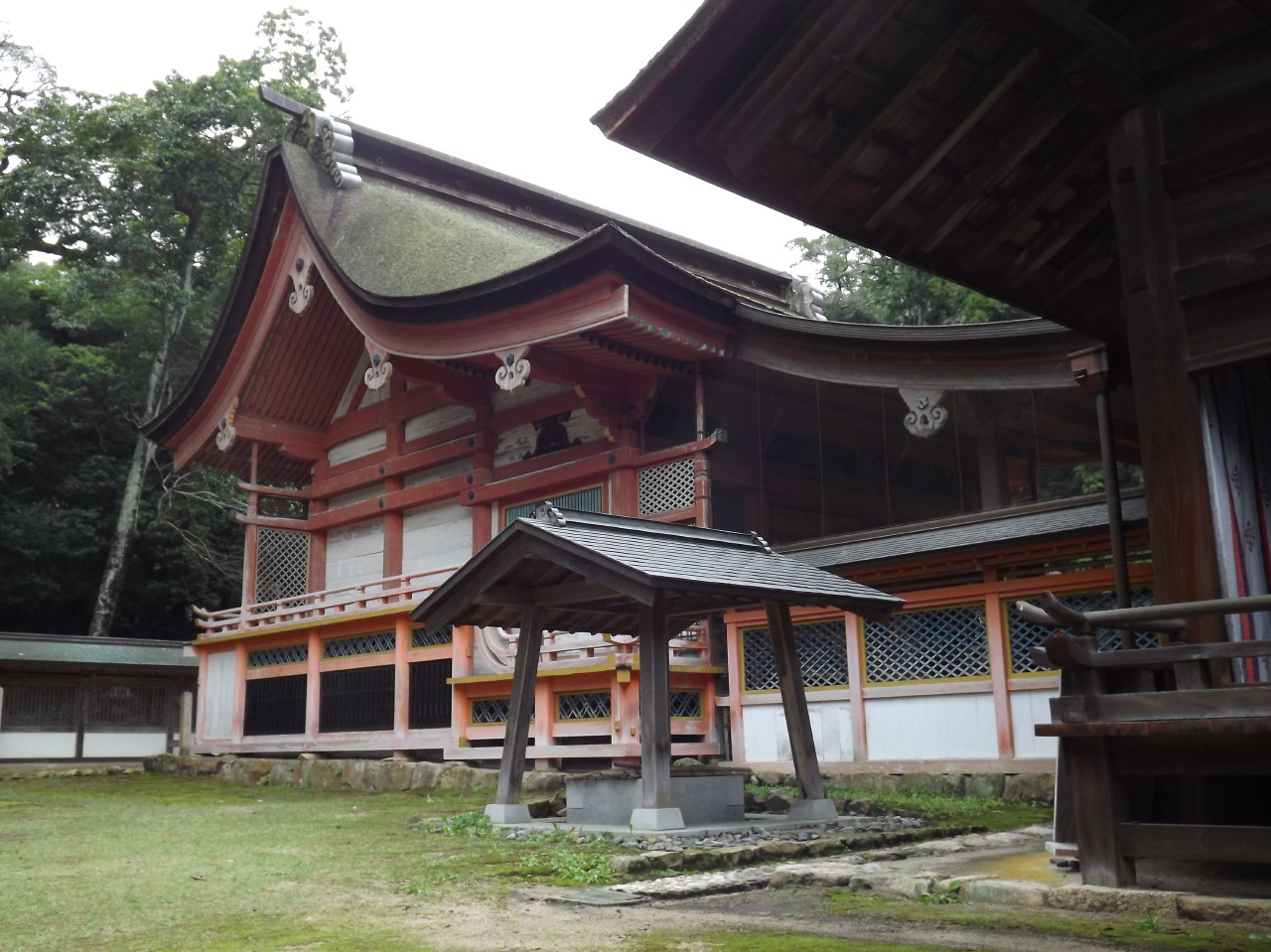
Honden

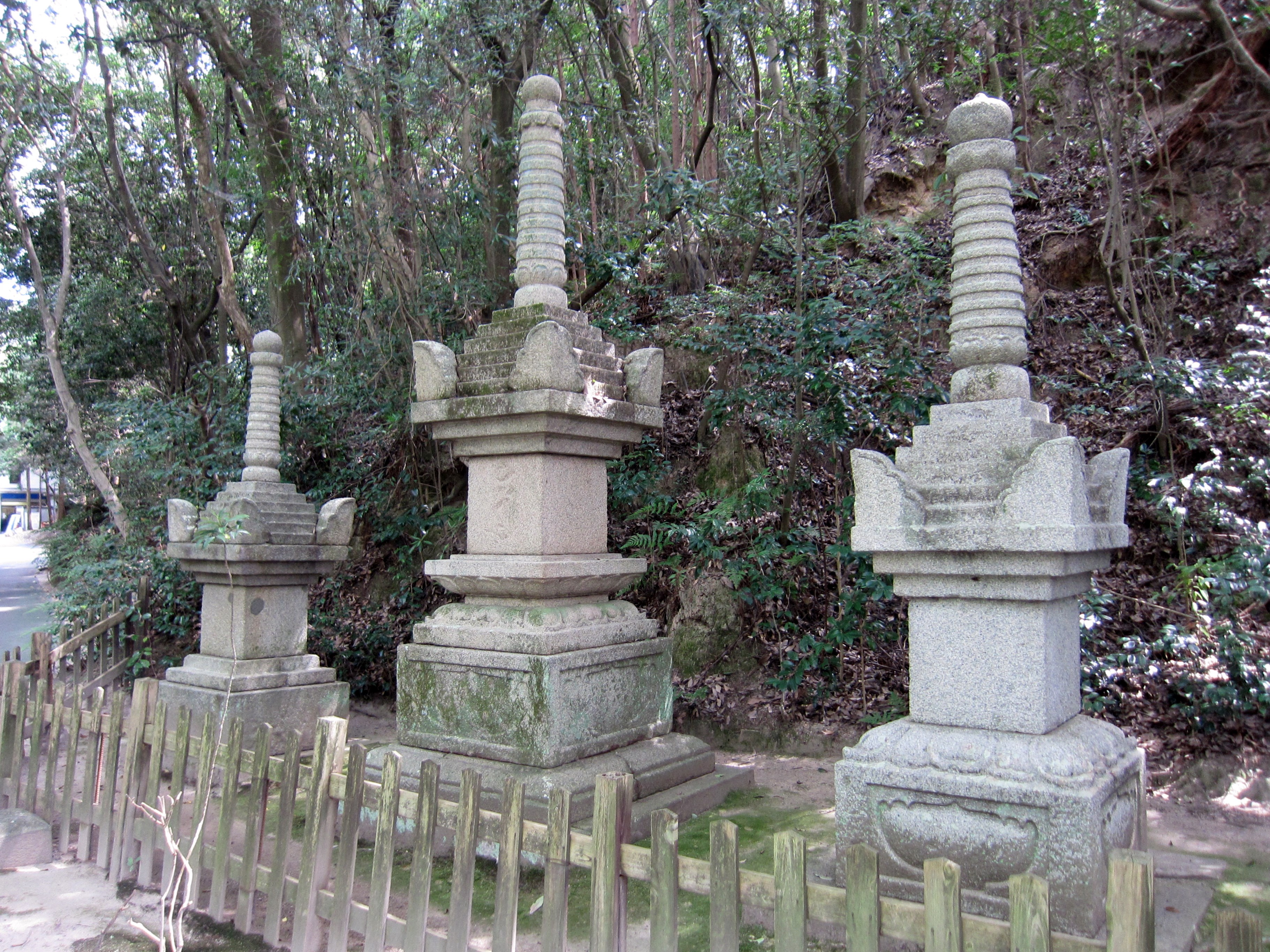
Hokyoin-to

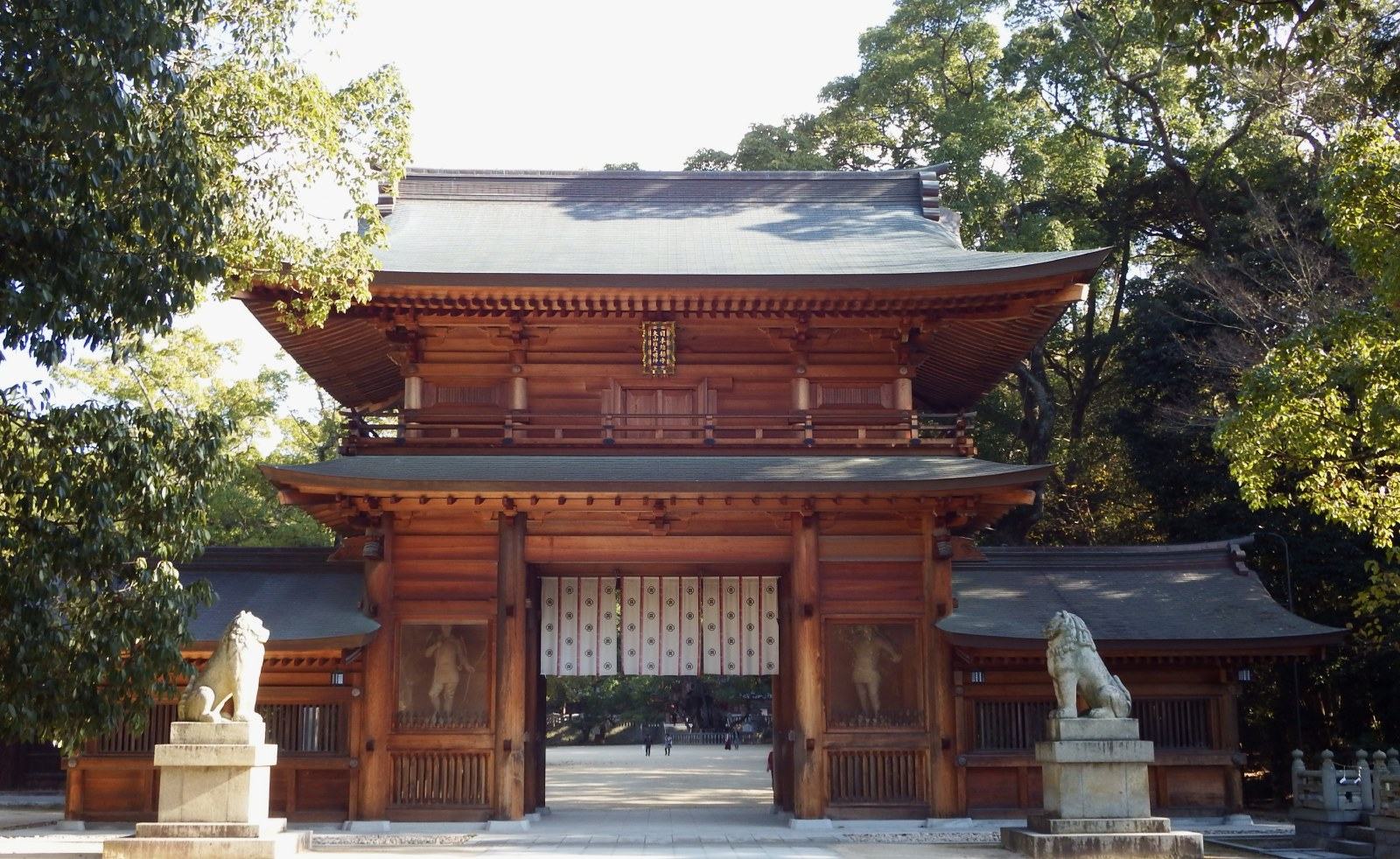
Gate

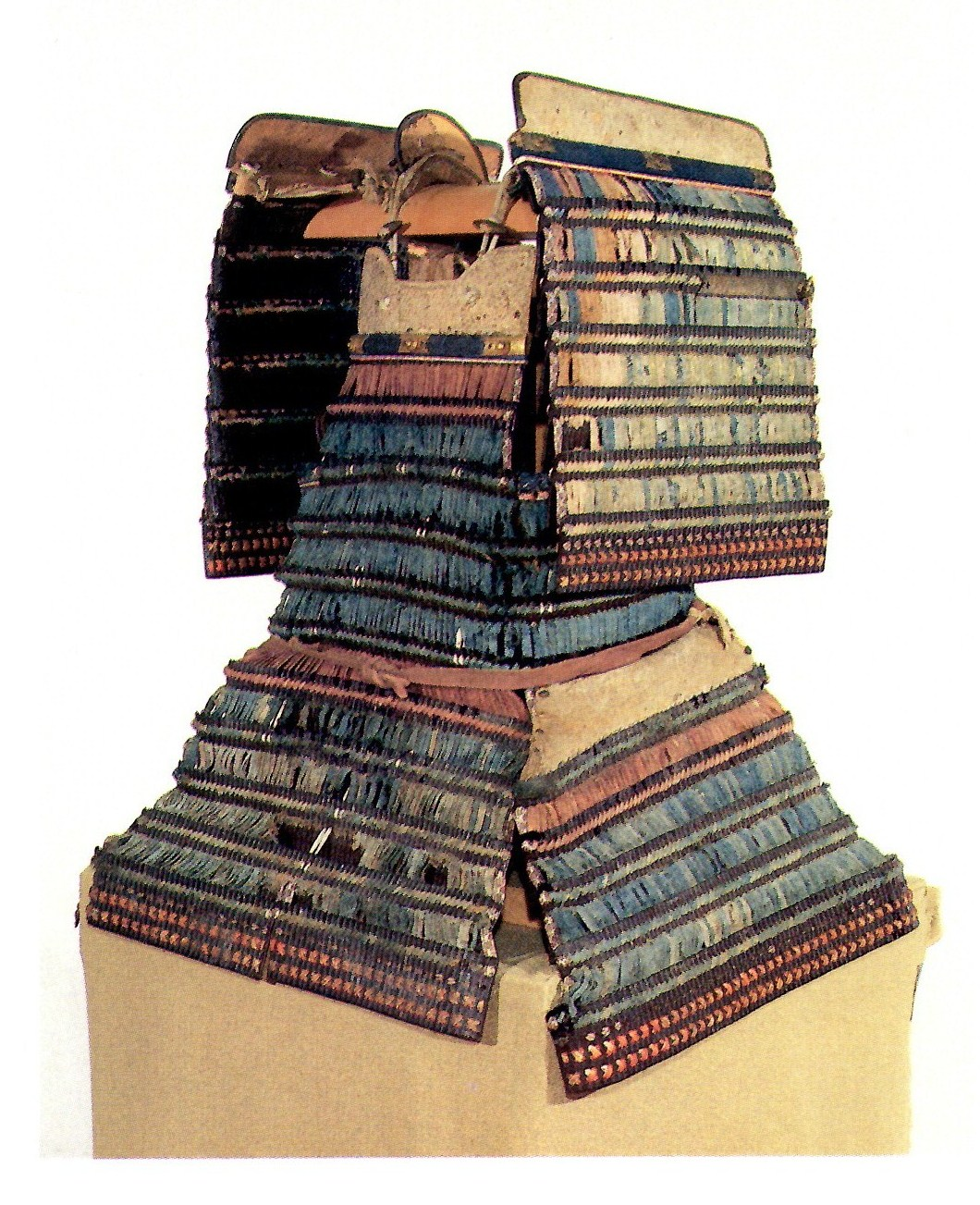
Armor of Kono Michiari

== See also ==
- Ichinomiya
- List of National Treasures of Japan (crafts-swords)
- List of Shinto shrines in Japan
