= Bo Ya =

Chinese musician

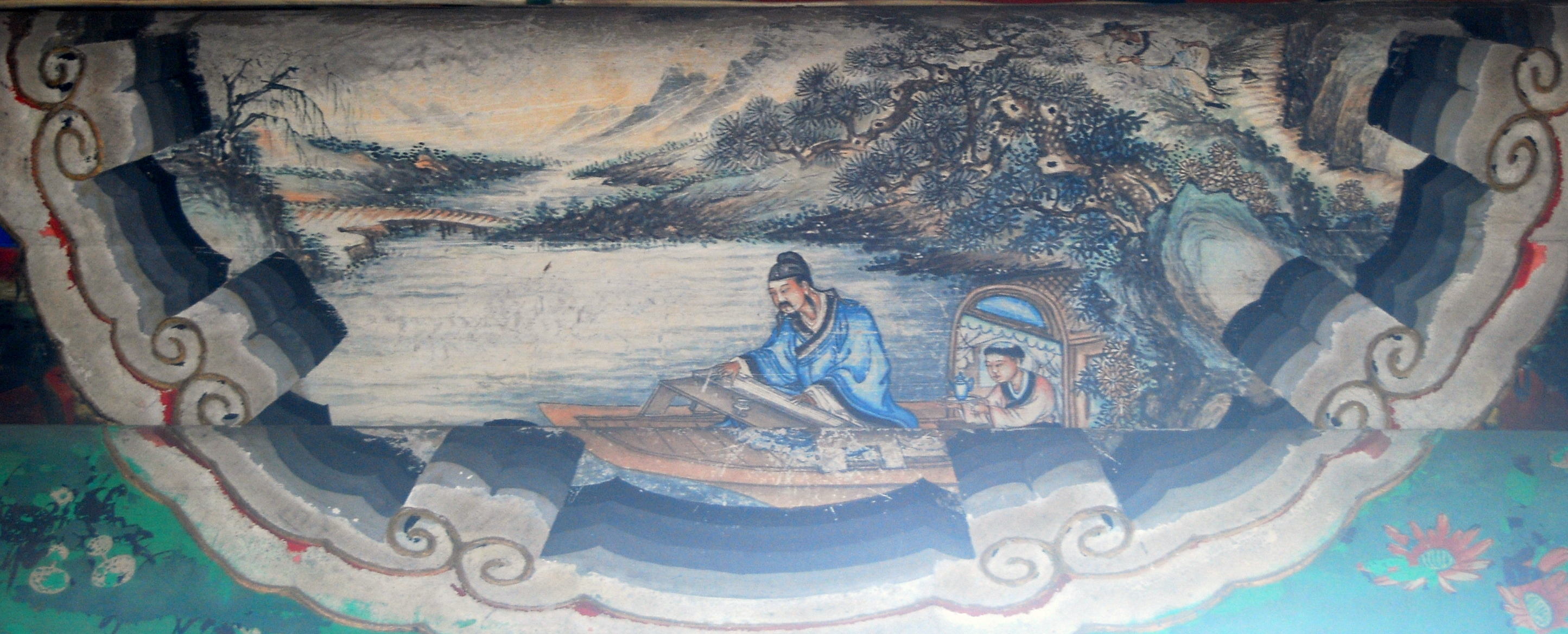
Mural of Bo Ya playing a guqin in the Long Corridor of the Old Summer Palace, Beijing

Bo Ya (Chinese: 伯牙; pinyin: Bó Yá) was a Chinese qin player and composer from the state of Chu (楚), which is roughly equivalent to modern-day Jingzhou, Hubei. He lived mostly during the Spring and Autumn period and later the succeeding Warring States period. His complete name is often incorrectly given as Yu Boya (俞伯牙) in Stories to Caution the World (警世通言), so he is sometimes referred to with the name of Yu Boya in modern literature. However, Bo Ya is the correct name, which is clarified in Lüshi Chunqiu (吕氏春秋).

== Life ==
=== Learning Guqin ===
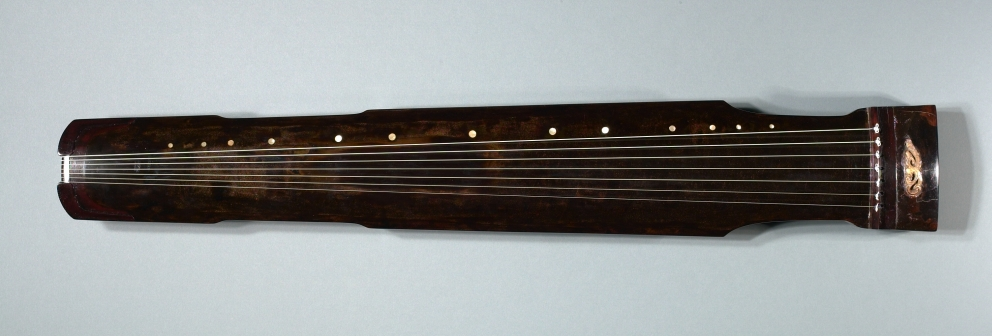
Guqin

Bo Ya is well known in the Spring and Autumn period and the Warring States period for his Guqin skill. According to Qincao (琴操) written by Cai Yong, He learned his Guqin skill from Chenglian, another famous Guqin player. When he was studying Guqin, his teacher brought him to Mount Penglai and left Bo Ya. Bo Ya was immersed in the natural sound of the waves and the mountain forest, and wrote down a piece of music called Shuixiancao (水仙操). After this experience, he becomes one of the best Guqin players in his times.

=== Story about Zhiyin ===
Bo Ya was good at playing the qin. Zhong Ziqi (锺子期) was good at listening to the qin. When Bo Ya's will was towards high mountains in his playing, Zhong Ziqi would say, "How towering like Mount Tai!" When Bo Ya's will was towards flowing water in his playing, Zhong Ziqi would say, "How vast are the rivers and oceans!" Whatever Bo Ya thought of Ziqi would never fail to understand. Bo Ya said, "Amazing! Your heart and mine are the same!" After Zhong Ziqi died, Bo Ya broke his guqin because he thought that no one else can understand his music.

Bo Ya's story with Zhong Ziqi generates the term Zhiyin (Chinese: 知音, original meaning: someone who knows music well), which means close friends that can completely understand each other. This phrase was historically adopted by the literati to refer to their good friends, and also to complement skilled gentlemanly qin players.

=== Musical work ===
==== High Mountain and Flowing Stream ====
High Mountain (Chinese: Gao Shan, 高山) and Flowing Stream (Chinese: Liu Shui, 流水) were originally sections of the same piece of music, with the first four sections recognized as "High Mountain" and the last eight sections recognized as "Flowing Stream." It is also said to be the music that Bo Ya played to Zhong Ziqi as it contains both elements of "towering like Mount Tai" and "vast rivers and oceans."

==== Shuixiancao ====
Shuixiancao (水仙操) was composed by Bo Ya when he was brought to Mount Penglai and stayed alone, inspired by the sound in the nature. It is Bo Ya's first famous Guqin music piece.

==== Huailingcao ====
Huailingcao (怀陵操) was composed by Bo Ya, which contains intense and passionate sound.

== Legacy ==
=== Music ===
The qin pieces composed by Bo Ya were widely spread and recognized in China and enjoyed a high reputation, especially the most famous piece called High Mountains and Flowing Water (Gao Shan Liu Shui). This qin piece is broadly accepted in China as one of the top ten famous traditional Chinese music pieces, as it describes the majesty, depth, solemnity and nobility of mountains, and the harmony between flowing water and mountains. It has a high aesthetic and musical value which reminds people of a spring of fresh water merrily flowing down a mountain, and the waves playfully rising. In 1977, Guan Pinghu's performance of "Flowing Water" was recommended by composer Chou Wen-chung to the National Aeronautics and Space Administration (NASA) and included in the Voyager Golden Record by NASA as a representative of Chinese music works.

The story of Bo Ya also reflects the meaning and significance of traditional qin music in ancient China. China's qin music is historically associated with the literati, and the general purpose of the literati playing qin pieces is not for the audience, but for themselves. They think music is an expressive art, and the priority is to serve themselves rather than the audience. Therefore, the criteria to judge and assess their music should meet the musician's personal aesthetic standards, and show obvious differences from the generally accepted ones, which thus indicates the unique personal taste of the musician. This is reflected by the story of Bo Ya finding his Zhiyin, who really understands his music and knows his mind. In this story, Bo Ya considers Ziqi his Zhiyin for he is the only one who understands his works of art and meets his criteria. This story of Bo Ya shows the general attitude of qin players toward playing in ancient China: the pursuit of aesthetic and the realization of personal musical standards.

Bo Ya's playing style is also unique and superb, which could provoke a connection with literature. As Francesca points out in his work, "Bo Ya's performance on the qin is not actually heard or imitated in the telling of the story, but is instead simulated synesthetically through the poetry of the narrative." He thinks that It provides a bridge between the natural world and the music.

=== Morality and philosophy ===
In Chinese culture, the word Zhiyin has become a special cultural mark. On the one hand, the word Zhiyin could be understood as a person who is proficient in music, on the other hand, it is regarded as the most intelligent critic and appreciator of all arts, including music. Zhiyin has now been extended to a broader meaning of a close friend who understands one's mind. When talking about Zhiyin, it would be generally accepted by people this word could be used to describe a soul mate or an intimate friend. This word is also frequently used by Chinese people to express their sadness for finding it hard to find a friend that knows about them. The story of Bo Ya and Ziqi has been considered as one important part the philosophy of inter-person relationship in Chinese culture, reflecting the Chinese ideal of friendship.

The story of Zhiyin also can show philosophical value through the lens of Confucian thoughts. In the story, Ziqi's understanding was not a matter of knowledge of melody. Obviously, he had a deep understanding of Boya's personality and was himself a man who pursues freedom and ideal, so he could arouse a "resonance" in Bo Ya's music. "Resonance" refers to the discovery of "oneself" in the object of appreciation. Ziqi knew that Boya was committed to high mountains and flowing water through his music, because he himself was committed to the mountains and water in the natural world as well. Ziqi found himself in Bo Ya's music, thus making himself empathize and sympathize with Bo Ya. Sympathy and empathy in the resonance could be heading to the realm of the integration of heart and object, subject and object, which is an important content in Confucianism.

=== Presence in literary and artistic works ===
- Bo Ya Jue Xian (2021) – A stage play created by Hunan Grand Theatre and Changsha Song and Dance Theater. The play is an artistic re-creation of the well-known story of "High mountains and flowing water, meeting an intimate friend (Gao Shan Liu Shui Yu Zhi Yin)"
- Bo Ya Qin (2016) – A song composed by songwriter Wu Xiaoping with lyrics written by lyricist Liu Pengchun, and sung by singer Wang Zhe.
- Bo Ya Jue Xian (2010) – A song sung and composed by Wang Leehom with lyrics written by Chen Xinhong and A Pu.
