= The Book of the Dead (film) =

- Japanese poster

Japanese name
- Kanji: 死者の書
Transcriptions
- Revised Hepburn: Shisha no Sho
- Directed by: Kihachirō Kawamoto
- Written by: Shinobu Orikuchi
- Produced by: Sakura Motion Picture Co., Ltd.
- Starring: Tetsuko Kuroyanagi; Rie Miyazawa
- Narrated by: Kyōko Kishida
- Cinematography: Minoru Tamura; Kunihiko Itami
- Music by: Ryohei Hirose
- Release date: 11 February 2006
- Running time: 70 minutes
- Country: Japan
- Language: Japanese

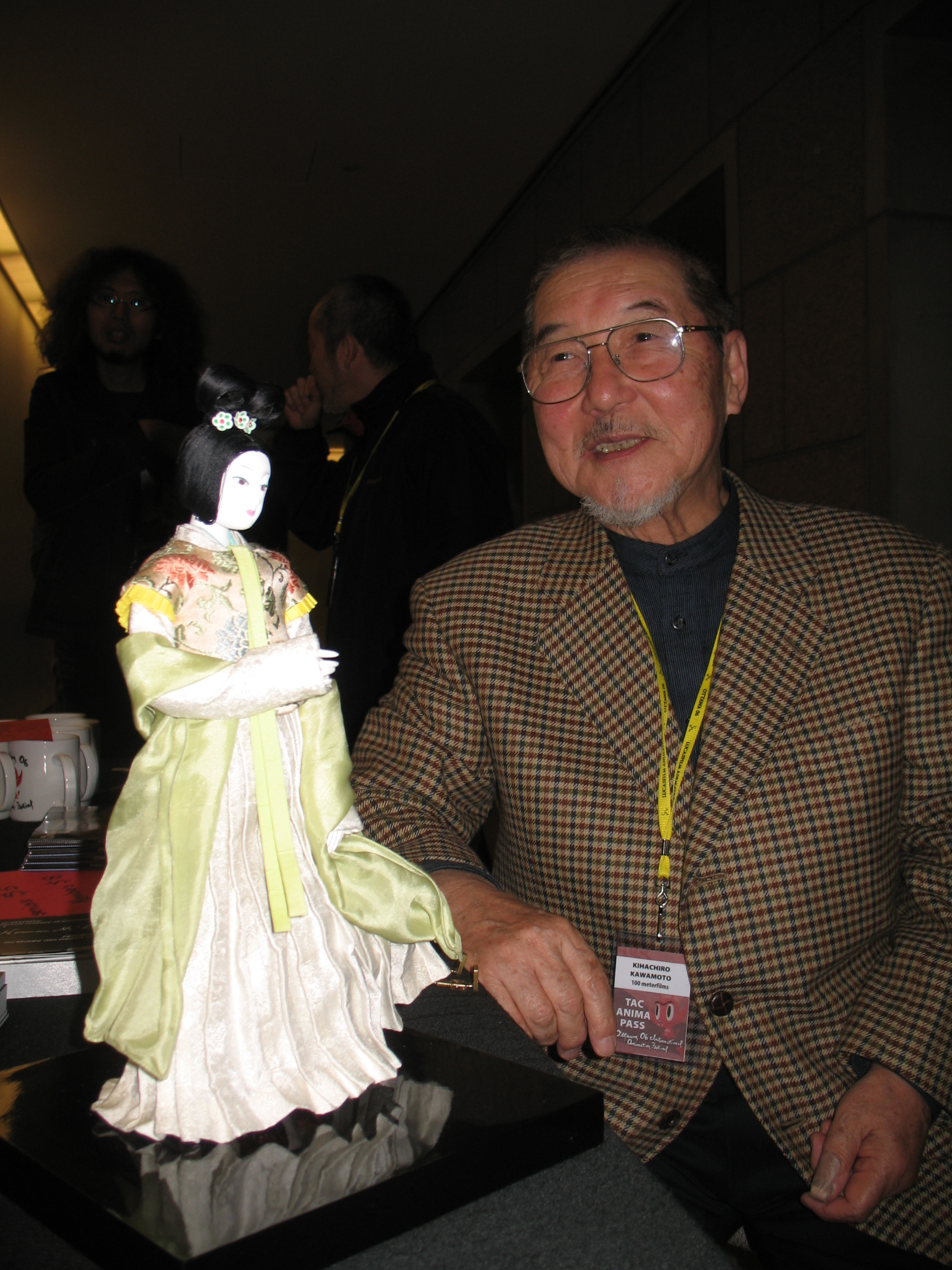
Kihachiro Kawamoto at the 2006 Ottawa International Animation Festival, sitting next to the puppet of the main character from the film.

The Book of the Dead (死者の書, Shisha no Sho; also known as "The Book of a Dead Person") is a 2005 Japanese historical Buddhist stop motion animation feature film directed by Kihachirō Kawamoto. It is about the legend of Chūjō-hime who translated some of the significant Pure Land sutras from Chinese to Japanese, and is said to have witnessed weaving of Taima mandala by Amitabha Buddha himself & his attendants from lotus stems. It is his second feature film, the first being the Rennyo and His Mother (1981) and is based on the novel of the same name by Shinobu Orikuchi. It appeared in a couple of film festivals in 2005 before going into wide release in Japan on 11 February 2006 and has since won several awards at international animation festivals. It was shown in cinemas across the United Kingdom in the spring of 2008 as part of Kawamoto: The Puppet Master, a touring season of the Watershed Media Centre, and was released on DVD-Video in North America on 22 April 2008.

== Plot ==
The Book of the Dead is set in the Nara period at around 750 CE, the era when Buddhism was being introduced from China.

Iratsume, a young woman from a noble house, becomes obsessed with the new religion and spends much of her time hand-copying the sutras, trying to understand the teachings of the Buddha. On the eve of each equinox and solstice she begins to see a radiant figure looking not unlike the Buddha floating between the twin peaks of distant Mount Futakami. One evening, after completing her one-thousandth copy of a sutra, her view the figure she has been longing to see again is obscured by a rainstorm. In pursuit of it she slips away from her household to the foot of the mountain, where she arrives at a temple that women are forbidden to enter. There she learns that the figure might not be Buddha, but the soul of the executed Prince Ōtsu which wanders in torment between this world and the next. When Iratsume and Ōtsu's soul encounter, they feel compelled to unite. They forge a bond, bringing comfort and peace to each other – a bond that allows the prince's soul to find rest. The film follows the Japanese teaching that came from Buddhism: that no matter who they are, friends or foes, the souls of the dead need to be relieved. Kawamoto has said that the film is dedicated to all the innocent people who have died in recent wars.

== Awards ==
The Book of the Dead received an Excellence Prize for animation at the 2005 Japan Media Arts Festival.

== See also ==
- List of animated feature films
- List of stop-motion films

== Notes ==
Acclaimed Russian animator and director Yuri Norstein was invited to work on the film as a "guest animator".
