= Katsushi =

- Gender: Male

Origin
- Origin: Japanese
- Meaning: Different meanings depending on the kanji used

Katsushi (written: 克志, 克史, 勝志, 豪氏 or かつし in hiragana) is a masculine Japanese given name. Notable people with the name include:

- Katsushi Boda (保田 克史), Japanese animator
- Katsushi Kurihara (栗原 克志; born 1977), Japanese footballer
- Katsushi Ōta (太田 克史; born 1972), Japanese editor
- Katsushi Sakurabi (桜美 かつし), Japanese anime director
- Katsushi Takemura (竹村 豪氏; born 1972), Japanese professional wrestler
- Katsushi Tao (田尾 克史; born 1963), Japanese ski jumper
