= Taima-dera =

Buddhist temple in Japan

- 當麻寺
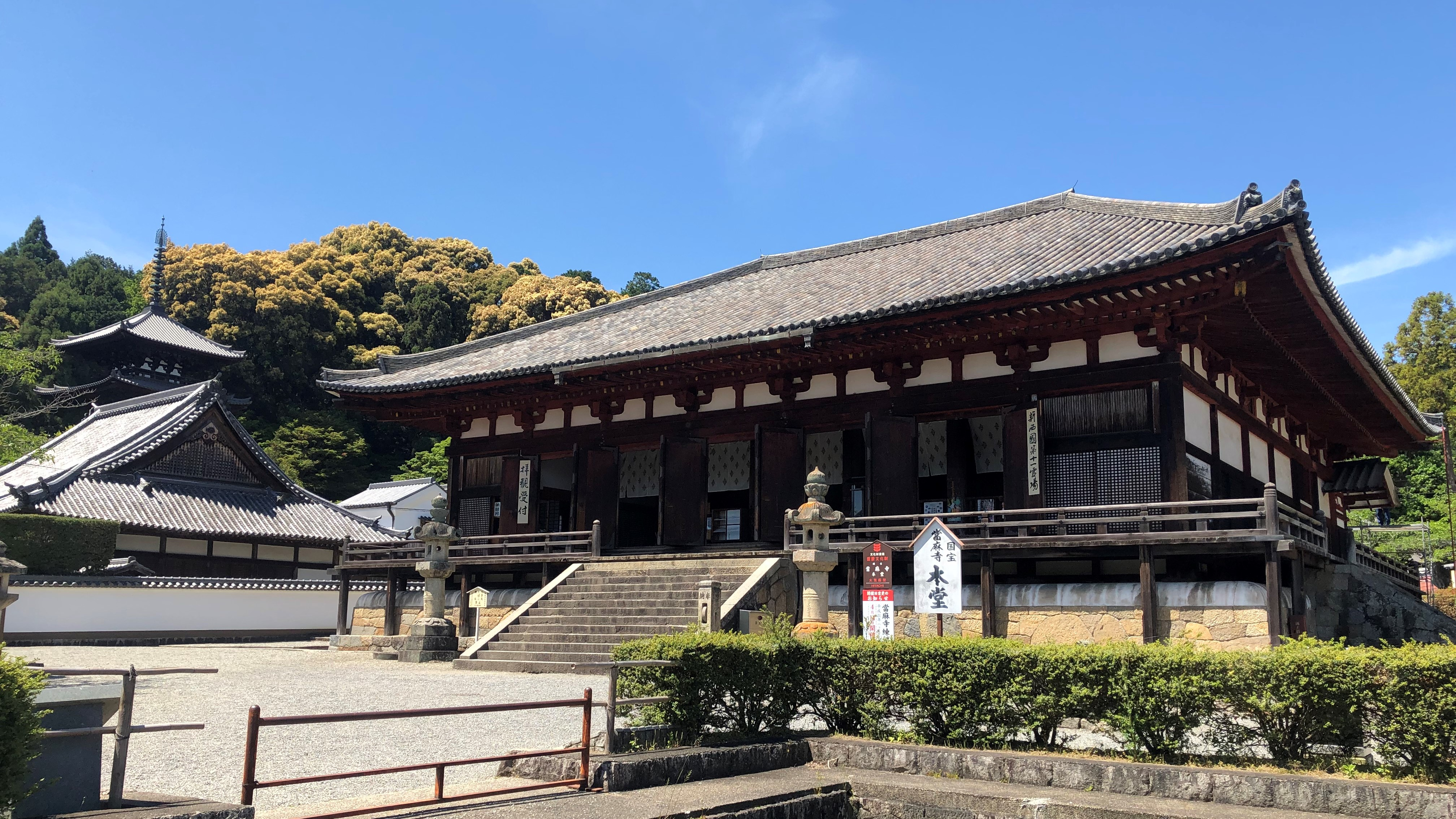
- Mandara-do (NT)

- Location within Nara Prefecture Location within Japan

Religion
- Affiliation: Buddhist
- Deity: Taima Mandala
- Rite: Shingon and Jōdo-shū
- Status: functional

Location
- Location: 1263 Taima, Katsuragi-shi, Nara-ken
- Country: Japan
- Coordinates: 34°30′57.9″N 135°41′40.7″E

Architecture
- Founder: c.Prince Maroko
- Completed: c.Asuka period

Website
- Official website
- National Historic Site of Japan National Place of Scenic Beauty }

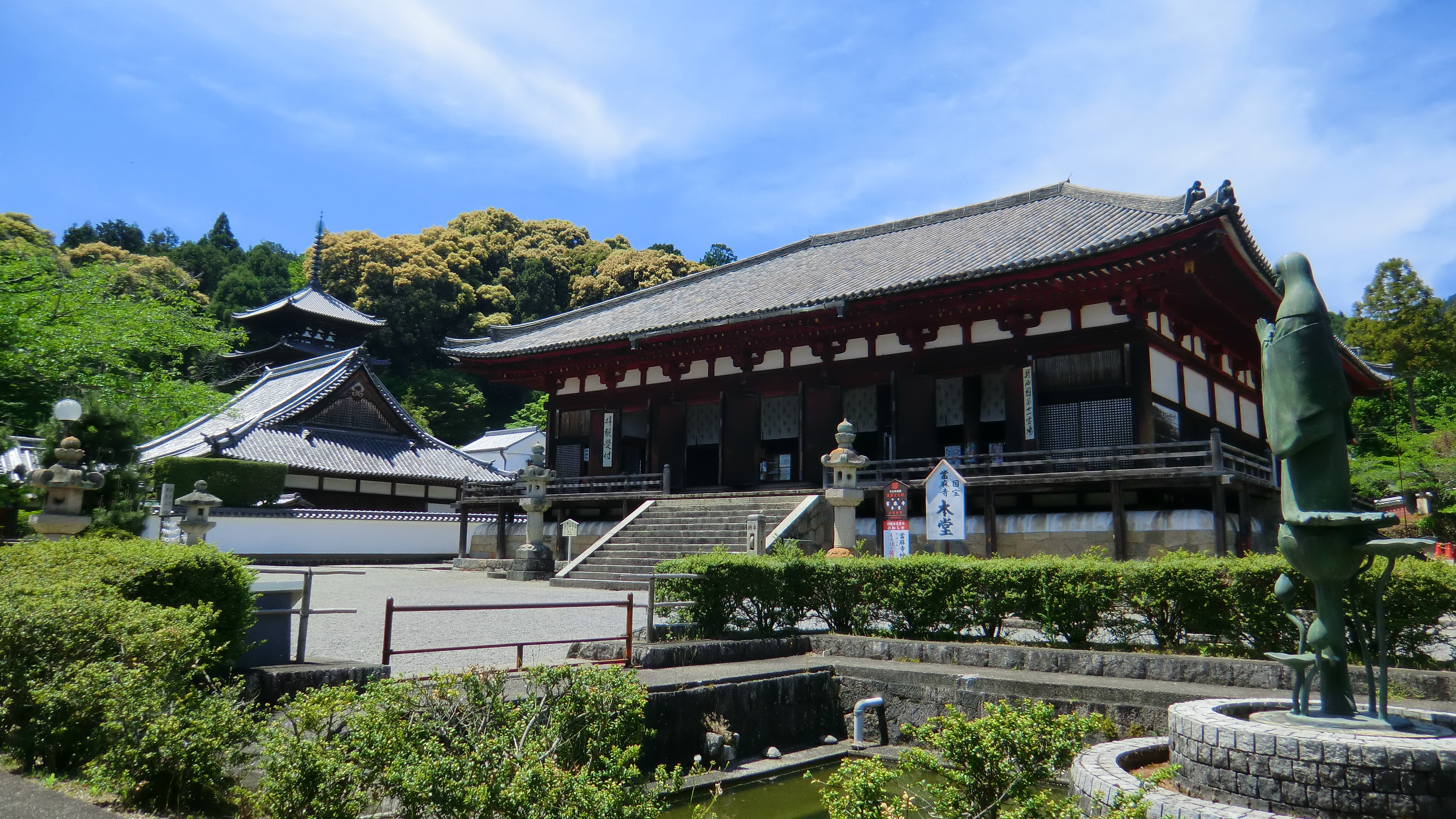
Taima-dera

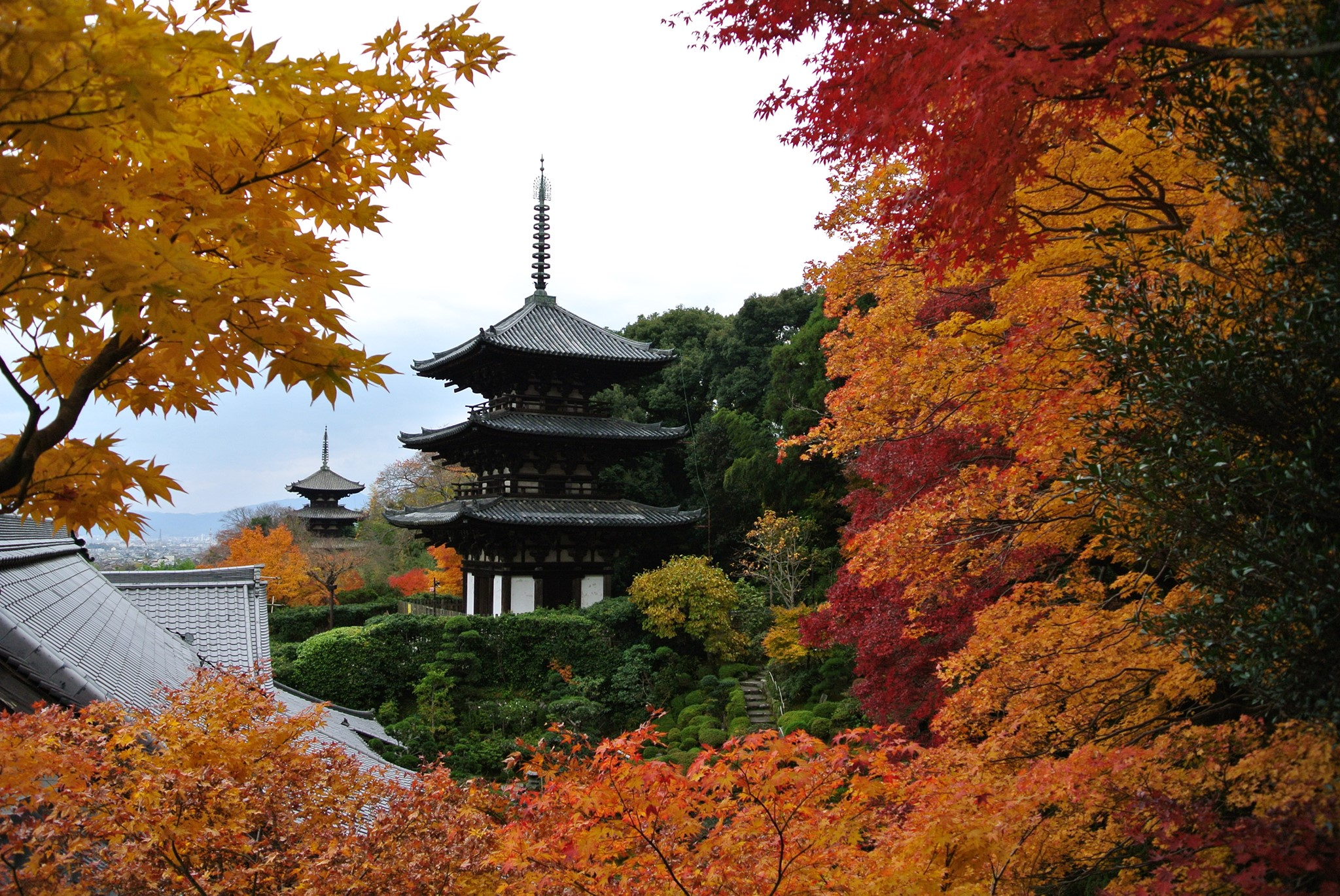
Taima-dera's twin pagodas

Taima-dera (當麻寺; also written 当麻寺) is a Buddhist temple located in the Taima neighborhood of the city of Katsuragi, Nara Prefecture, Japan. It belongs to the Shingon and Jōdo traditions of Japanese Buddhism and its honzon is the Taima Mandala, a graphical representation of the Pure Land. The temple's full name is Nijō-san Zenrin-ji (二上山 禅林寺).The temple is a pilgrimage site for Pure Land Buddhists, and for its connection to the legend of Princess Chūjō, as well as for its twin triple-story pagodas built in the Nara period to the early Heian period.

== History ==
The temple is said to have been founded by Prince Shōtoku's half-brother, Prince Maroko (Prince Taima), but there are many unknowns about its founding. The temple is located at the western edge of the Nara Basin, bordering Osaka Prefecture, and was an important transportation and military location in ancient times. Mount Nijō was a sacred mountain and is located opposite Mount Miwa, a sacred mountain in the eastern part of the Nara Basin. As Mount Nijō is located in the west of Yamato Province, and since the setting sun sets between its two peaks, it was regarded to be the entrance to the Western Paradise and the destination of the souls of the dead. Mount Nijō was also a source of tuff, which was used to make burial chambers for kofun burial mounds and later as the foundation stone for Buddhist temples. The Taima area was on the Yokooji road, the mai east-west road connecting Yamato with Kawachi Province and thus the main route along which cultural artifacts from Tang China and the Korean Peninsula were transported from the port of Naniwa (Osaka) to the capital. It is believed that Taima-dera was built as the clan temple of the Taima clan, a branch of the powerful Katsuragi clan that held sway in this area. Its statues of Miroku Bosatsu (Maitreya Bodhisattva), and the Four Heavenly Kings statues enshrined in the main hall, the temple bell and stone lanterns in the precincts, the excavated brick Buddhas, and old roof tiles all show a style dating to the reign of Emperor Tenmu (late 7th century), and it is believed that the temple was founded around this time. However, the exact date and circumstances of its founding are not clear as there are no records in the official histories.

It was only in the Kamakura period, when faith in the Taima Mandala began to spread, that the origins of Taima-dera began to appear in various books and records. One of the earliest examples is the book "Kenkyū Pilgrimage Record," which was compiled in the late 12th century, recording a pilgrimage in 1191, when a monk from Kofuku-ji guided a noble woman (presumably Hachijō-in, the daughter of Emperor Toba) on a tour of famous temples and shrines in Yamato. According to the origins in the book, the temple was founded by Prince Shōtoku's half-brother, Prince Maroko, and was relocated by his grandson, Taima no Mahito Kunimi, in the 9th year of the reign of Emperor Tenmu (680). According to the Yamato no Kuni Taima-dera Engi (The History of Taima-dera in Yamato Province) written in 1253, the temple was founded in 612 by Prince Maroko in Kawachi Province. Later, in 673, En no Gyōja donated the temple site where Taima-dera is currently located, but construction did not begin until 685. The Taima-dera Engi, cited in the Jōgū Taishi Shūiki (1237), also states that the temple was founded in the 20th year of the reign of Empress Suiko, and was originally located in a place called Ajisoji, south of the current Taima-dera temple, and was moved to its current location in 692.

The temple's history from the Nara to Heian periods is poorly documented. Taima-dera is the only temple in Japan to have its original twin pagodas intact, which date from around 710 AD. The existing main hall (Mandala Hall) was built in 1161, according to the ink inscription on the ridgepole, but an investigation during dismantling and repair revealed that the building reused parts from a predecessor building built in the Nara period. The Taima Mandala handed down at the temple is said to have been created in 763, according to the aforementioned Kenkyū Gojunrei-ki. Originally, the temple was of the Sanron tradition, but the Kōbō Daishi Nenpu (Chronological Records of Kōbō Daishi) states that in 823, Kūkai visited Taima-dera and worshipped the mandala, and from then on Taima-dera became a Shingon temple. On January 15, 1181, Taima-dera, which had a close relationship with Kofuku-ji, was also burned down by Taira no Shigehira during the Genpei War, with only the temple's east and west pagodas surviving. At the end of the Heian period, with the spread of the Mappō ideology, the belief that one would be reborn in the Western Pure Land of Amida Buddha in the next life spread, and Amida halls were built in great numbers. From this time on, Taima-dera began to attract worshippers as the temple as the "Taima Mandala," depicts of Amida Buddha's Pure Land. Shoku, the founder of the Jōdo tradition's Seizan school, wrote the "Taima Mandala Commentary" in 1223 and created over a dozen copies of the Taima Mandala, placing them in various provinces, contributing to the spread of the Taima Mandala. In 1370, during the Nanboku-chō period, the 12th abbot of Chion-in in Kyoto, founded Ojo-in (now Oku-in) within the temple grounds, and since then the temple has been a place of study for both Shingon and Jōdo traditions. As the legend of Princess Chūjō was popularized in Noh plays, Jōruri and Kabuki, the temple remained a popular pilgrimage destination in the modern era. In the Hōreki era (1751-1764) in the Edo period, the temple had 31 sub-temples, of which 13 still exist.

== Precincts ==
At the current Taima-dera, the Kondō and lecture hall stand side by side, facing south, and to the west is the Mandala Hall, facing east. It was customary for ancient Japanese temples to face south, but the grounds of Taima-dera are bordered by mountains on the south and west, and there is no trace of a main gate on the south side. The main gate is the East Great Gate. To the south of the central temple complex stand two three-story pagodas, one on the east side and one on the west side, but these two pagodas are located at the tip of a plateau, six to seven meters higher than the ground on which the main hall, lecture hall, and other buildings are built. Furthermore, the eastern and western pagodas are not built exactly symmetrically when viewed from the north-south central axis of the temple complex connecting the main hall and lecture hall. It is not known why the temple was built on the border between the flat land and the plateau, but an ancient tomb was found underground the main hall, and supports the presumption that Taima-dera was constructed on this location as a clan temple on land where the ancestors of the Taima clan were buried.

=== Main Mandala Hall ===
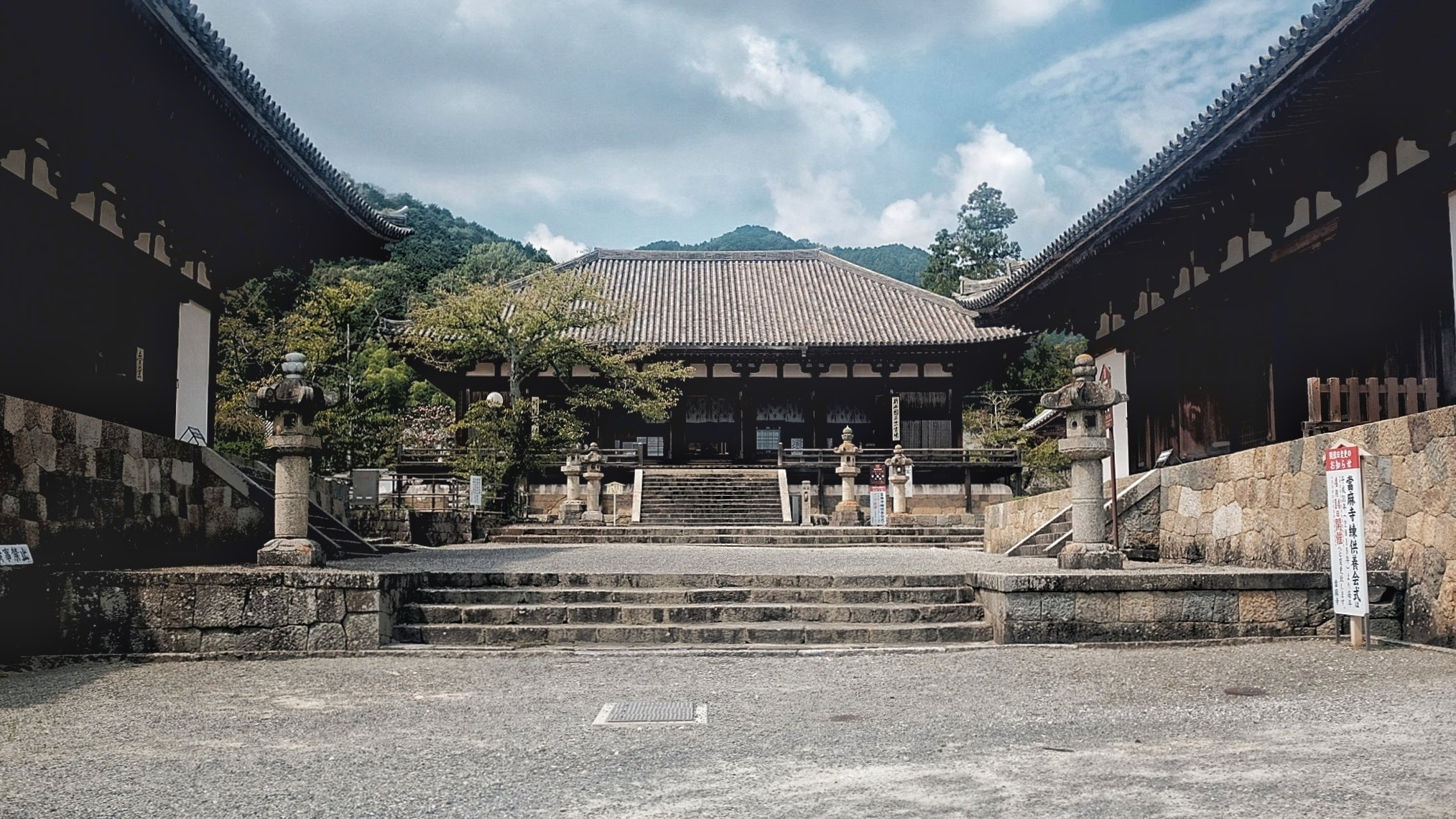
Mandala main hall with Kondō on the left and Kōdō on the right

The Mandala Hall is the main hall of Taima-dera and is a National Treasure. It stands to the west of the Kondō and lecture hall, facing east. It is a seven-by-six bay structure with a hipped roof. Of the six bays, the back three bays are the inner sanctuary, and the front three bays are the prayer hall. The inner sanctuary has a five-meter-tall shrine (National Treasure) on a stepped platform that houses the Taima Mandala (National Treasure). The bays on the left and right (north and south) ends are divided into small rooms, and the westernmost room on the north side houses a standing statue of Jūichimen Kannon, commonly known as the Ori-dono Kannon. The three bays on the north side of the back are fitted with an altar shelf. During the dismantling and repair work carried out from 1957 to 1960, calligraphy dated 1161 was discovered on the ridgepole, revealing that the structure was built in the late Heian period, and investigation revealed that this hall was a remodeled version of the predecessor hall built in the early Heian period (around the 9th century), and that the predecessor hall itself re-used materials from buildings dating back even further to the Nara period. The investigation revealed that the first predecessor hall from the Nara period was a gabled building with seven bays across and four beams, with pillars standing in the ground, and materials from at least two buildings of the same style were reused for the current main hall. The building was clearly built in the Nara period, as it was built using Tenpyo shaku. Later, in the early Heian period, it was remodeled into a hall (the second predecessor hall) with seven bays across and four beams, and a hipped roof. At this time, the roof was not tiled, but was made of cypress bark or planks. Since the existing shrine in the main hall was also constructed around this time, it is presumed that the remodeling into the second predecessor hall was for the purpose of enshrining the Taima Mandala. Later, a grand eaves was added to the front of the hall, and in 1262, it became the current structure with seven bays across and six bays deep. The inscription on the tiles indicates that the roof was repaired in 1268, and around the same time, other modifications were made, such as the addition of a ledge to the back of the hall, a coffered ceiling (originally a decorative attic) to the outer sanctuary, and the division of the north and south eaves into small rooms. During the aforementioned dismantling and repair, numerous wooden haloes for Buddhist statues were discovered in the attic. These wooden haloes are estimated to have been made in the 9th to 11th centuries, but the Buddha statues to which they belonged were not found, and it is a mystery why so many of them were left behind and stored in the attic.

=== Kondō ===
At the time of construction, the Kondō was designated as the main hall at Taima-dera before switching to the Main Mandala Hall. It is a National Important Cultural Property (ICP). It was rebuilt in the Kamakura period. It has a hip-and-gable roof and is a five-by-four bay structure. The roof was originally made of thick planks and covered with wooden tiles. The interior has a dirt floor, with the central three bays across and two bays deep forming the inner sanctuary. The entire sanctuary is plastered, and a turtle-bellied altar is built, housing the principal image of a clay seated Maitreya Buddha and dry lacquer statues of the Four Heavenly Kings. It is small compared to the main halls of the great temples of Fujiwara-kyō and Heijō-kyō, but is an appropriate size for a main hall of a clan temple, and is thought to have maintained the same size since its founding. The hall stands on a high foundation of stonework, but the foundation is high compared to the size of the hall because the ground has been eroded over the years and the foundation was raised. On the left pillar facing the front of the inner sanctuary is an inscription of a land donation dated 1268, which suggests that the temple was rebuilt in 1184, during the early Kamakura period. No burnt soil layer was found under the floor, but there are signs of fire on the pedestal of the main image, which is believed to have been burned when the lecture hall to the north was destroyed in the fire of 1181. Large-scale repairs were carried out in 1326.

The stone lantern in front of the Kondō is also an ICP. It dates to the Asuka period and is the oldest known stone lantern in Japan.

=== Kōdō ===
The Kōdō (ICP) is situated opposite to the Kondō and houses many Buddhist statues dating from the 9th to 12th century. It is a seven-by-four bay structure. Ink inscriptions on the rafters indicate that it was rebuilt in 1303. Like the Kondō, the roof was originally made of thick planks and tiled wood. The interior of the hall has a wooden floor covering the central two bays, and houses a seated Amida Nyorai statue, another seated Amida Nyorai statue, a standing Myodo Bosatsu statue, and a standing Jizō Bosatsu statue (all Important Cultural Properties), as well as many other Buddhist statues. A layer of burnt soil has been found under the floor, proving that it was burned down in 1181.

=== East Pagoda ===
The East Pagoda (NT) is a three-story pagoda with a total height (including the spire) of 24.4 meters. Based on the style of the details, it is estimated to have been built at the end of the Nara period. The first story is three bays long (meaning four pillars on each side and three spaces between them), while the second and third stories are two bays long. In Japanese shrine and temple architecture, it is unusual for the number of spaces between the pillars to be an even number and for the pillar to be in the center. The three-story pagoda at Hōki-ji has an example of a two-bay structure, but the East Pagoda at Taima-dera is the only ancient pagoda in Japan that has two spaces between the second story instead of three. The spire on the roof has nine ring-shaped components called "kyurin" in ordinary pagodas, but this pagoda has eight rings. Furthermore, the water smoke (suien) design at the top of the spire has an unprecedented fishbone-shaped design, making this a pagoda with many unusual features. It is not clear whether the spire is from the original construction.

=== West Pagoda ===
The West Pagoda (NT) is a three-story pagoda with a total height (including the spire) of 25.2 meters, slightly higher than the East Pagoda. Judging from its style, it is estimated to have been built slightly later than the East Pagoda, in the early Heian period. The West Pagoda differs from the East Pagoda in many ways aside from its height. The spacing between the pillars is three bays from the first to the third story. Like the East Pagoda, the spire on the roof has eight rings, but the water smoke design is different from that of the East Pagoda. Inside the first story, boards have been laid around the central pillar, and there are traces of paintings of 3,000 Buddhas and the Pure Land Mandala. When the West Pagoda was repaired between 1911 and 1914, a reliquary made of three nested containers made of gold, silver, and gilt bronze (gold-plated copper), and is thought to have been made in the late Asuka period (Hakuhō period, late 7th century) based on its style. was discovered enshrined at the top of the central pillar. Documents discovered at the same time indicate that it was placed there during the repair work carried out in 1219, but placing the relics at the top of the central pillar instead of under it is rare. In addition, whereas the East Pagoda is made of hinoki cypress, the West Pagoda is made of zelkova serrata. This is also unusual for hardwood materials to be used in architecture up to the Heian period. Since the construction date of the Western Pagoda (early Heian period) does not match the production date of the relic container (late Asuka period), it is highly likely that the Western Pagoda was built in the Asuka period and rebuilt in the early Heian period.

=== Oku-no-in (Inner Temple) ===
The Oku-no-in temple is situated at the west end of the temple. It contains the Jōdo Garden (Garden of Pure Land) which is the largest garden representing the paradise shown in the Taima Mandala. There are peonies, colored leaves, and other flowers bloom throughout the year. In 1370, the 12th abbot of Chion-in, moved the statue of Honen (ICP) that was the principal image of Chion-in, and founded the temple sub-temple. It was originally called Ojo-in.

=== Sainan-in (South-West Temple) ===
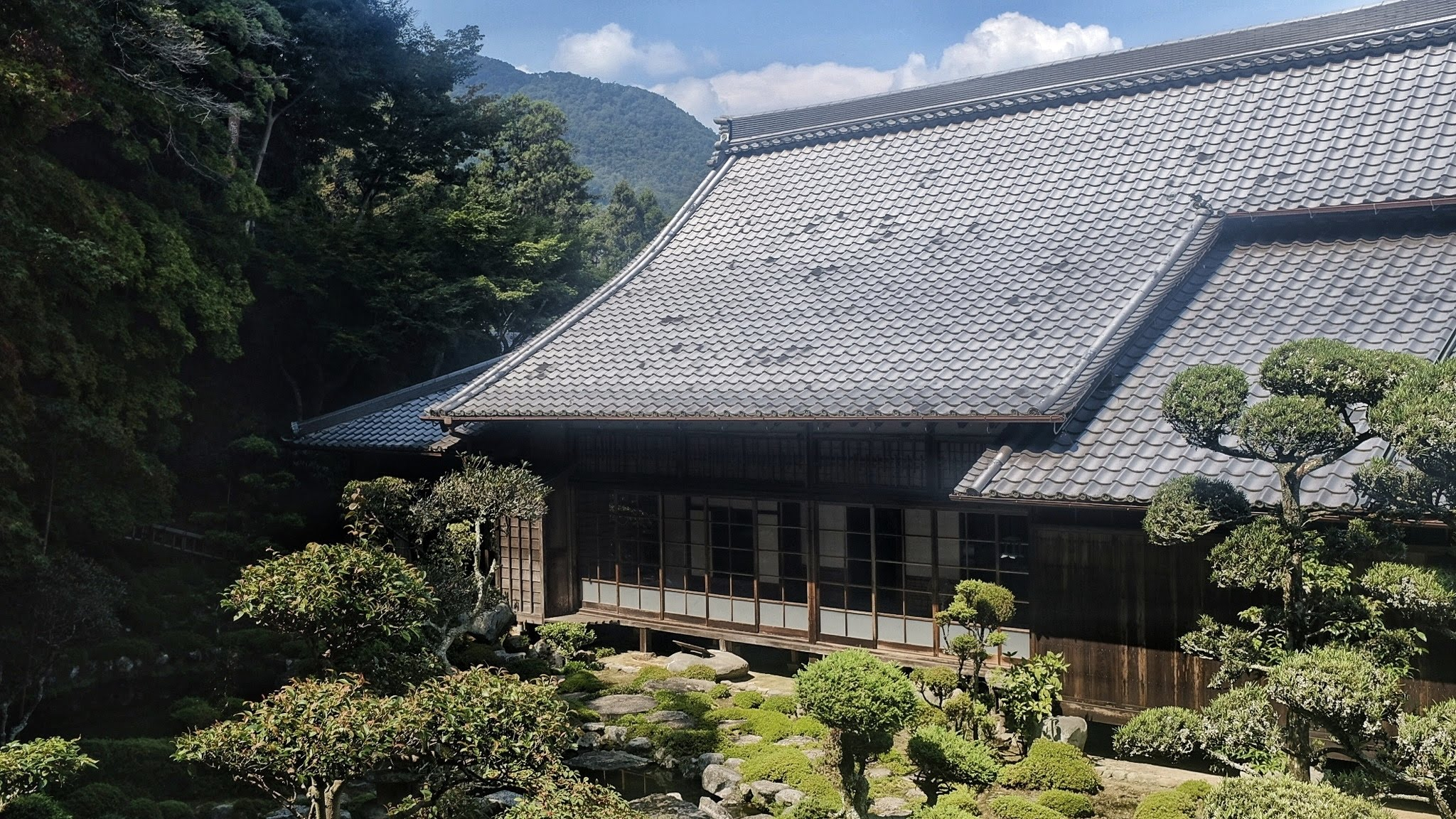
Sainanin temple

The Sainan-in was originally built to be a guardian temple near the back gate. There are three statues of Kannon which worshipped in its main hall and in the back there is a garden made in the early Edo era.

=== Naka-no-bo (Middle Temple) ===
The Naka-no-bo is the oldest temple in Taima-dera, and belongs to the Koyasan Shingon school. It is said to be the place where Princess Chujō became a nun, and was founded by her Buddhist teacher, Jitsuga. It is also said to have been founded by En no Gyōja. The temple is known for its gardens which are especially famous for its spring peonies. The temple is a National Historic Site and its garden is designated a National Place of Scenic Beauty.

=== Gonen-in Temple (Praying Temple) ===
Gonen-in temple is said to have been the residence of Princess Chujō. This temple houses the masks and costumes representing Boddhisatvas which are used in the Neri-Kuyo Eshiki, a special memorial parade for Princess Chujō, which is one of the main events in the Taima-dera calendar. It features a procession of twenty-five priests wearing masks and special costumes representing Bodhisattvas and who re-enact the world depicted by the Taima Mandala. They walk and dance across a long bridge, which is believed to link this world with the Pure Land, giving hope to commoners that they, too, one day may reach the Pure land.

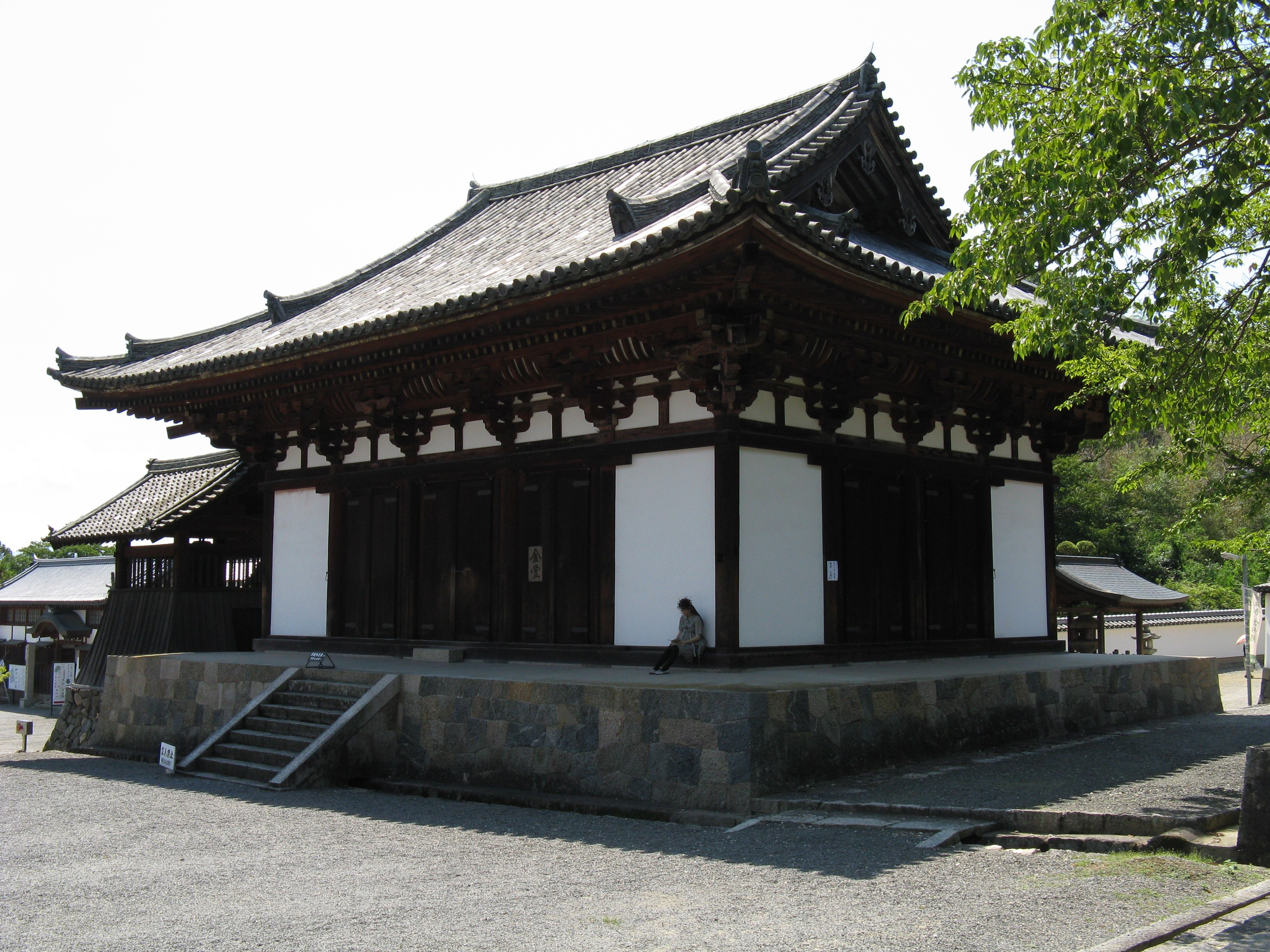
Kondō (ICP)

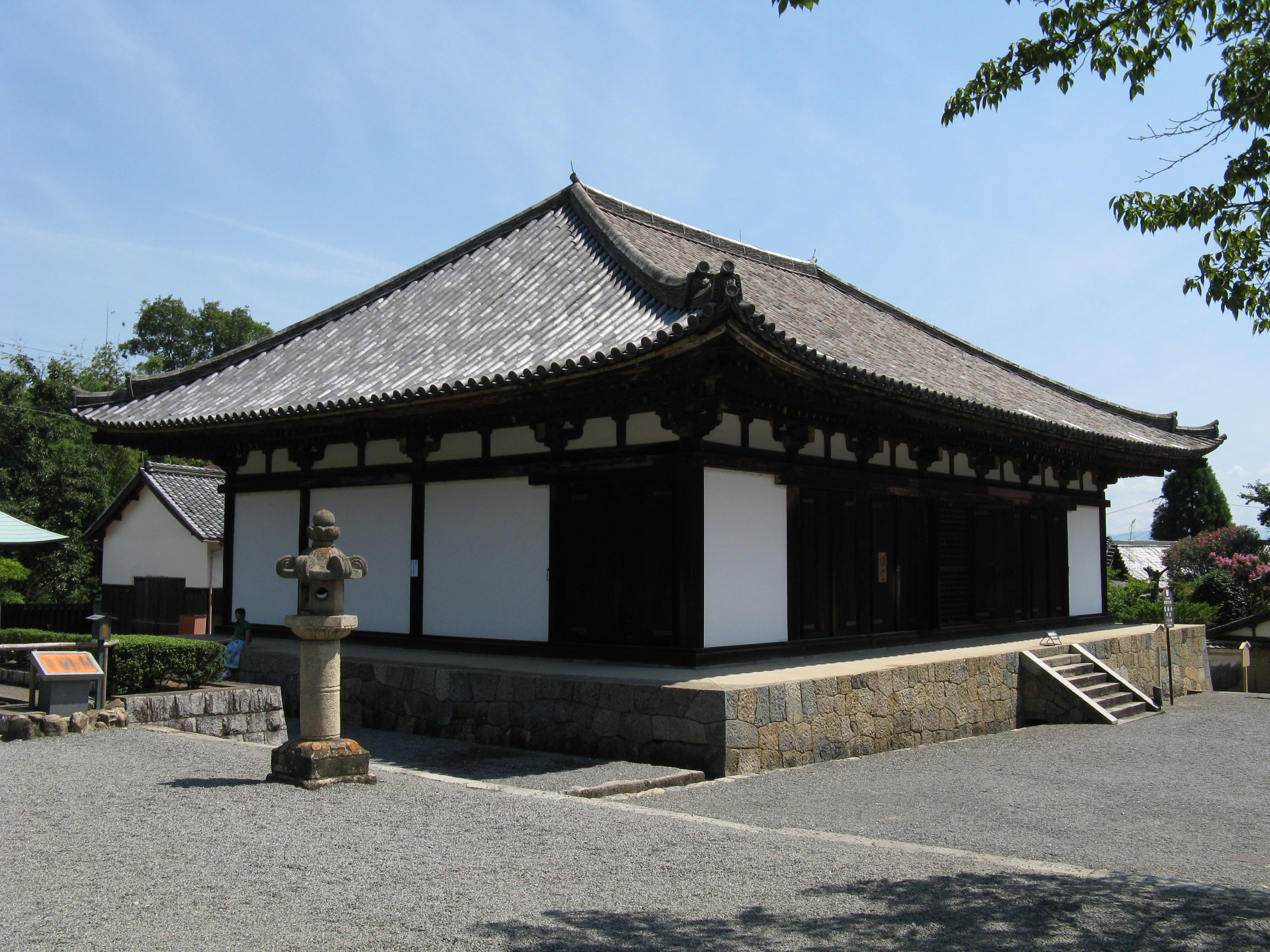
Kōdō (ICP)

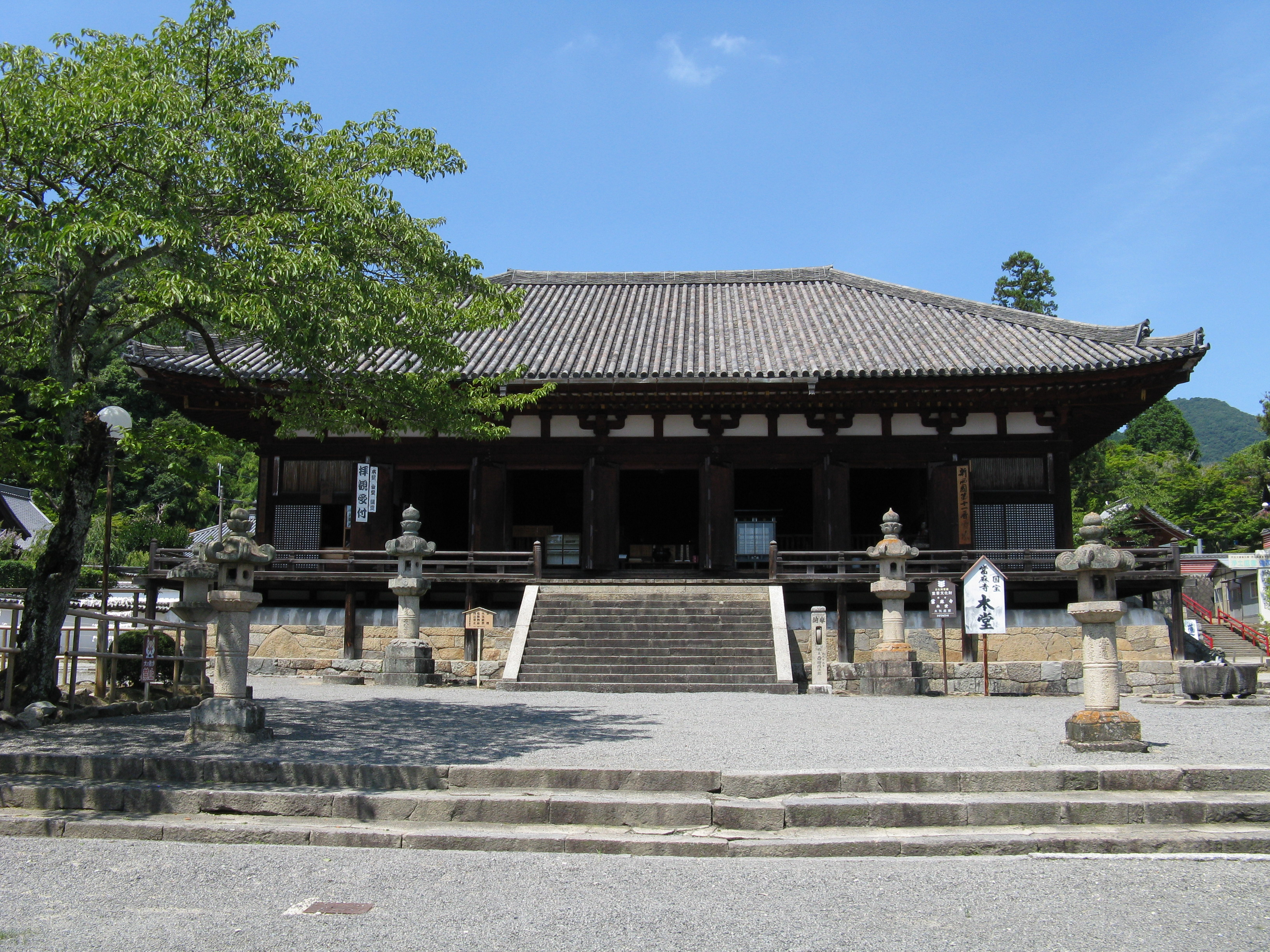
Mandara-dō (NT)

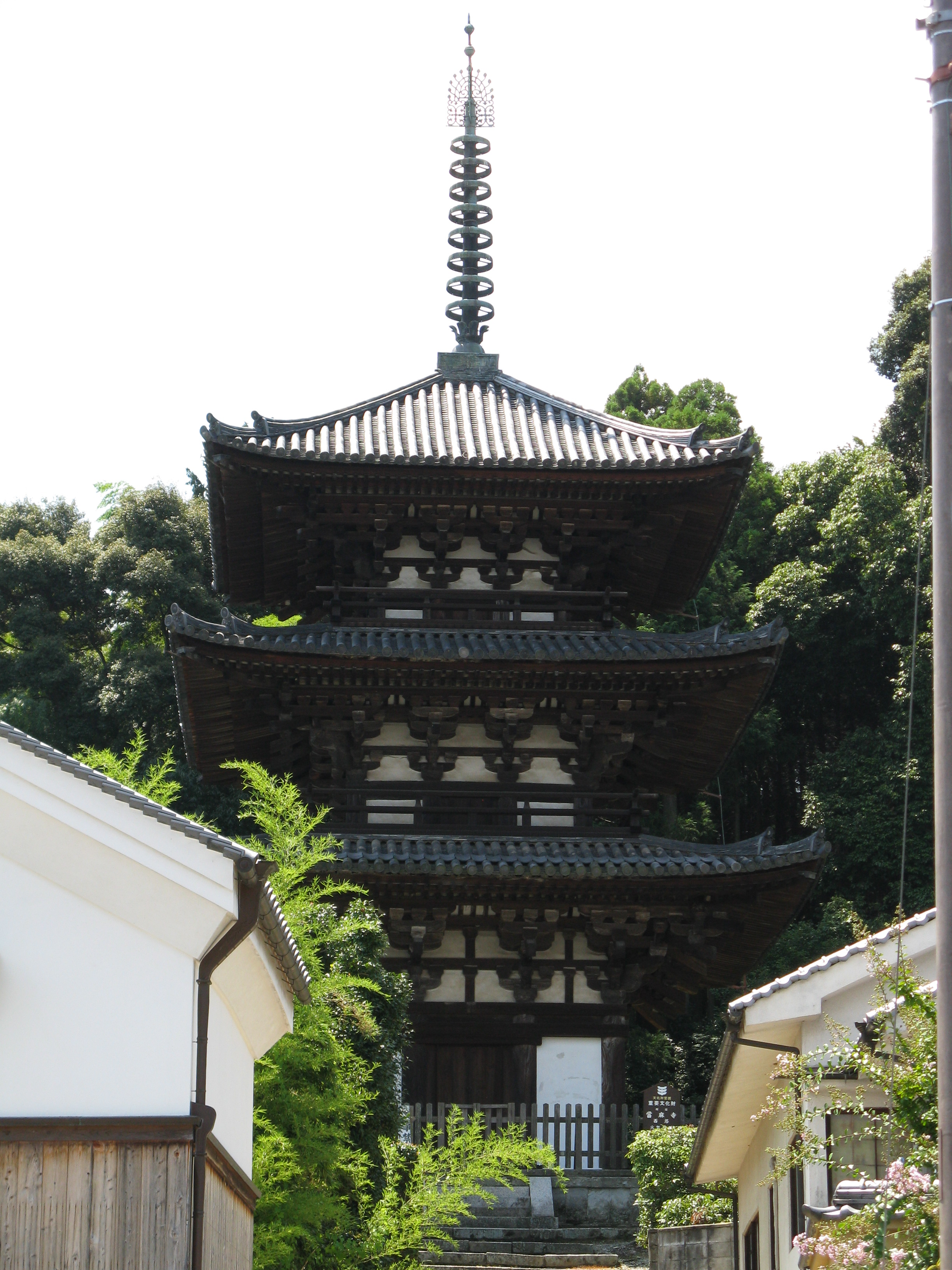
West Pagoda (NT)

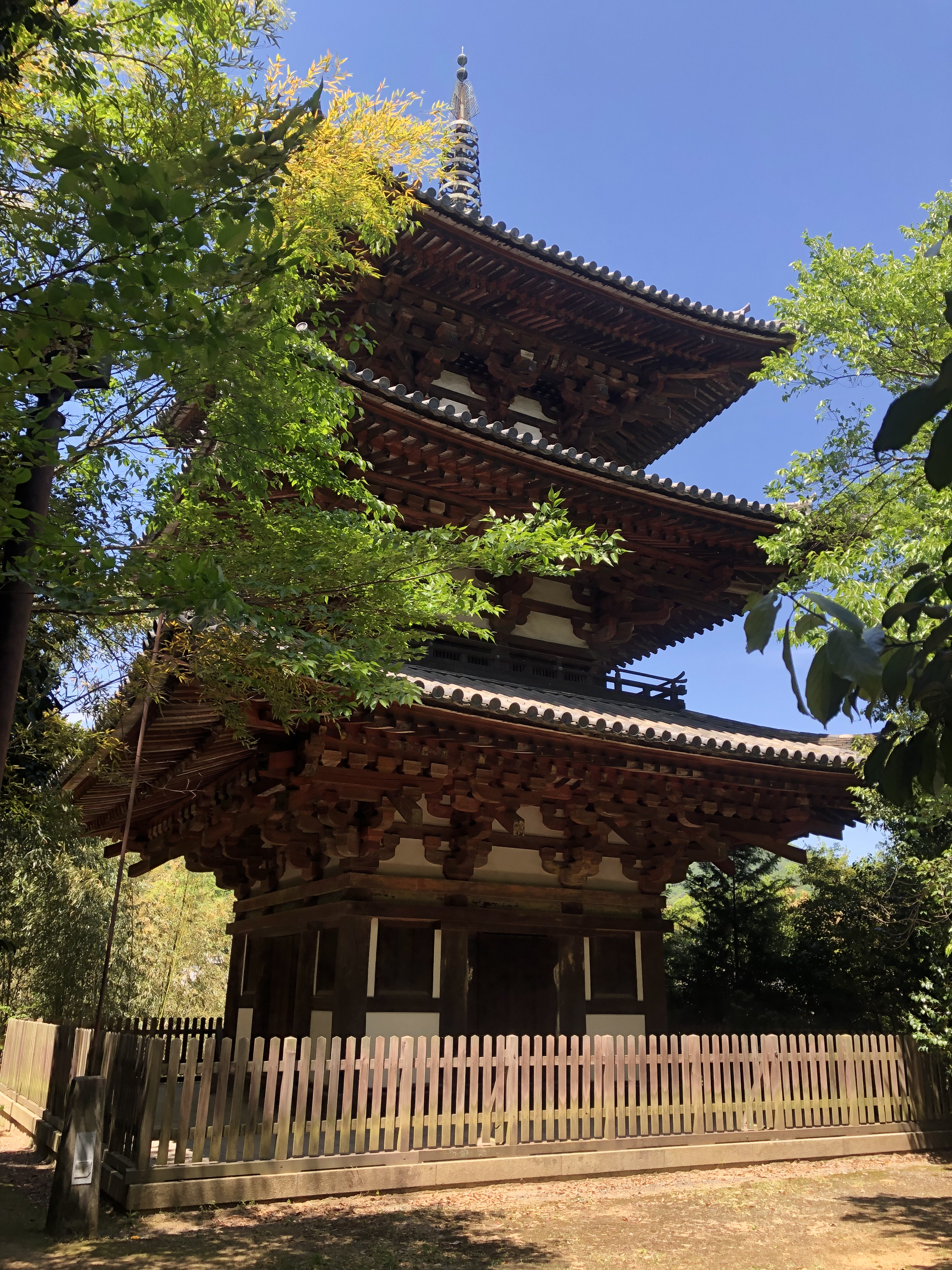
East Pagoda (NT)

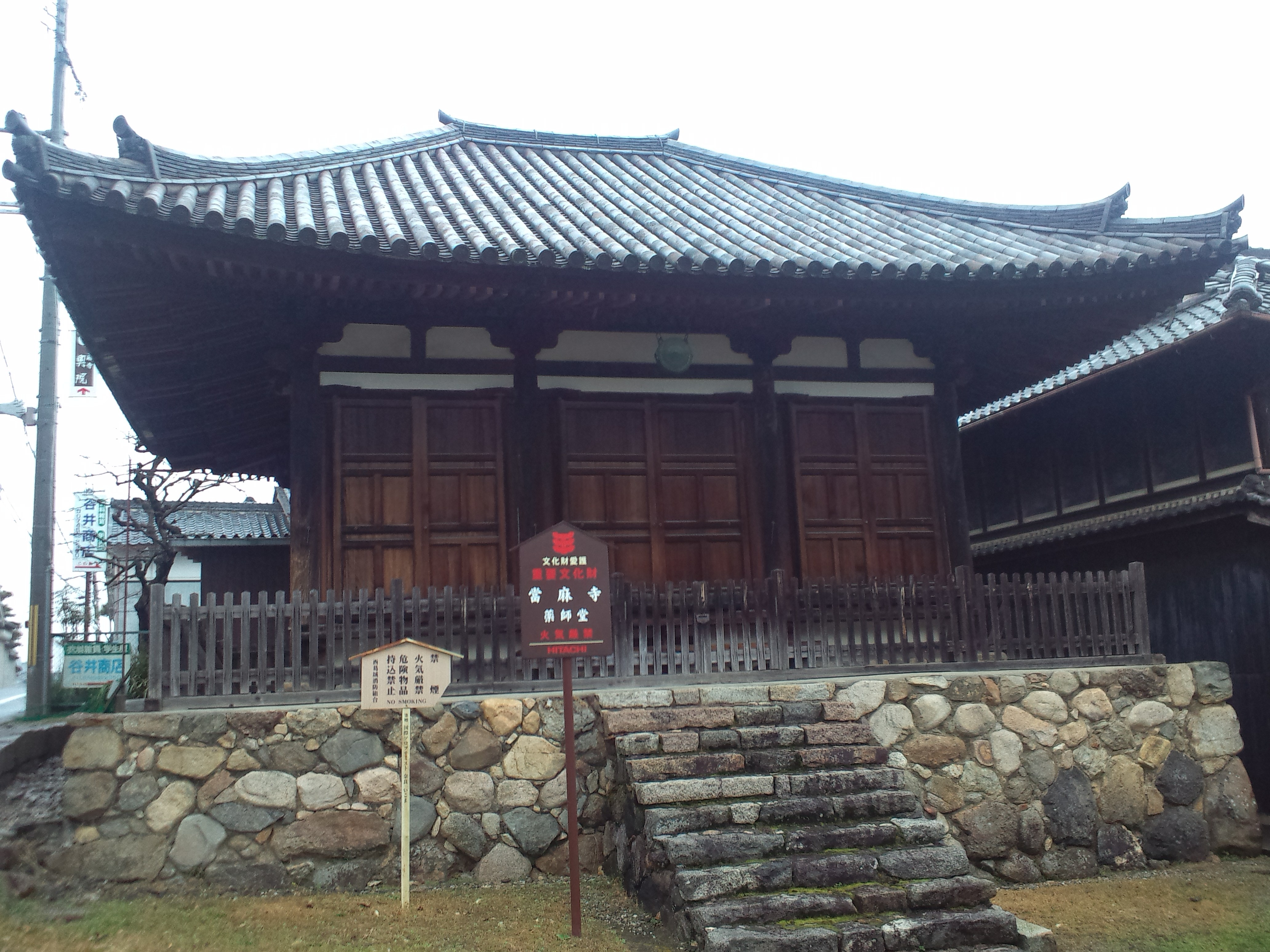
Yakushi-dō (ICP)

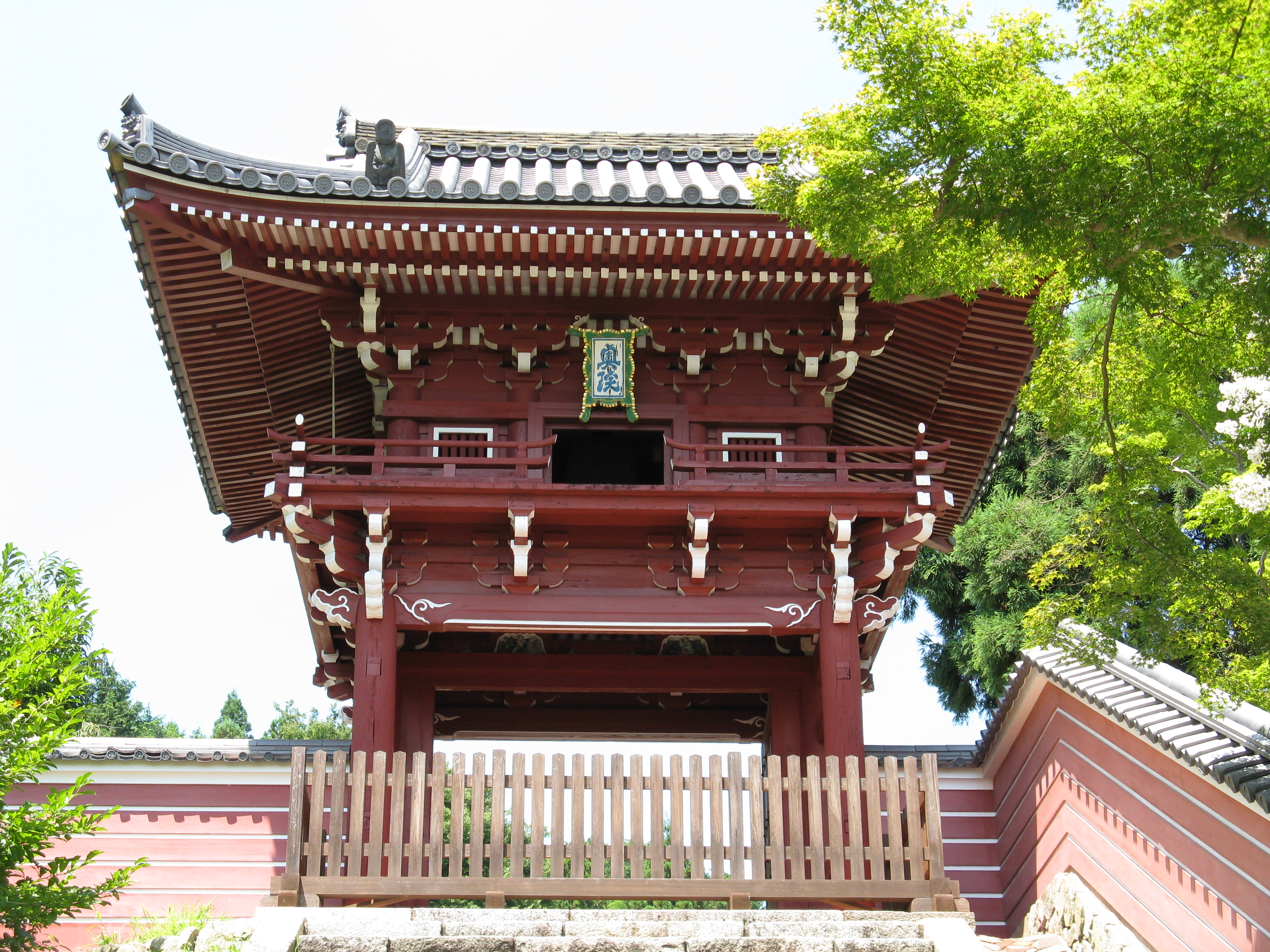
Oku-no-in Rōmon (ICP)

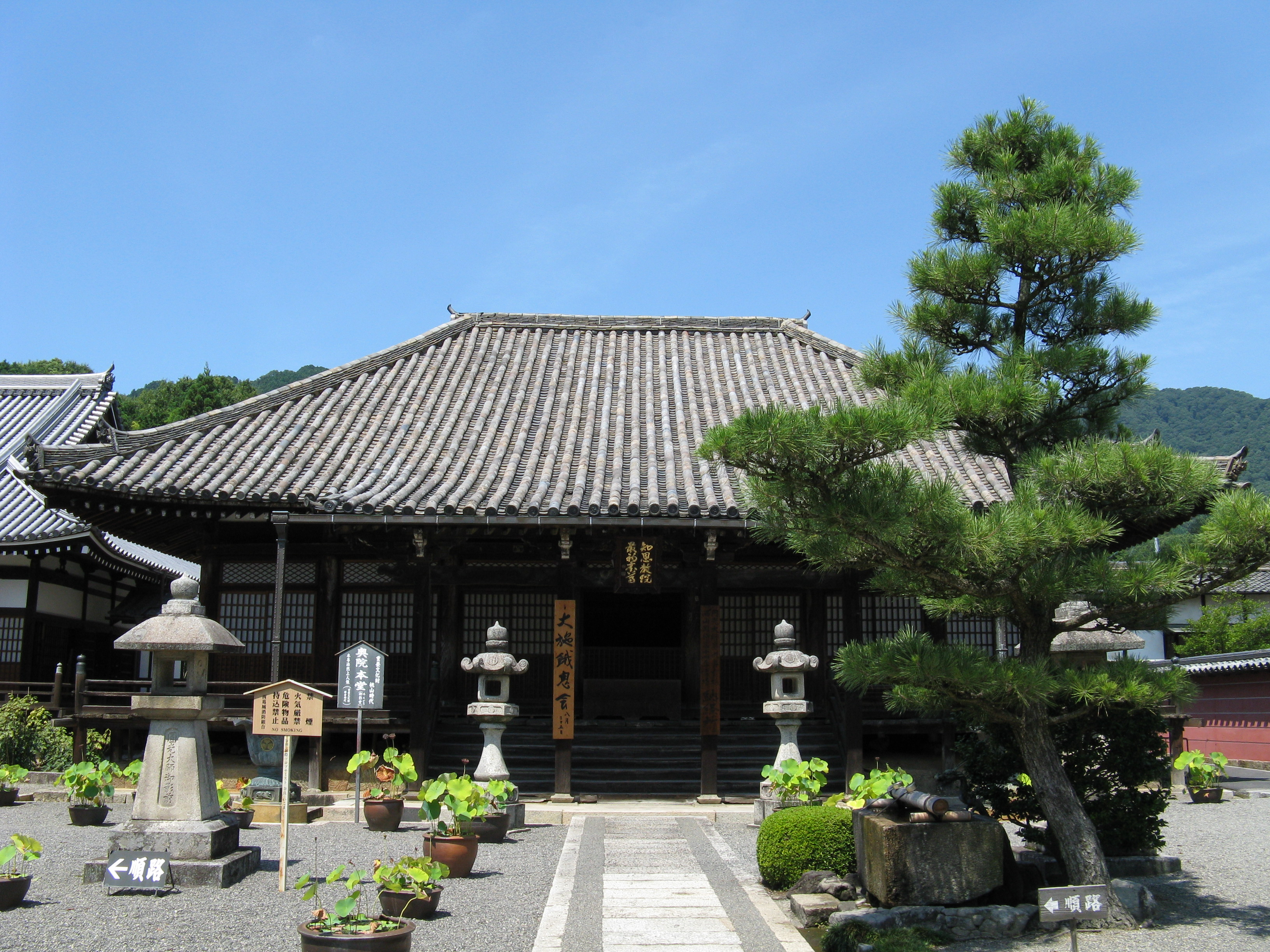
Oku-no-in Main Hall (ICP)

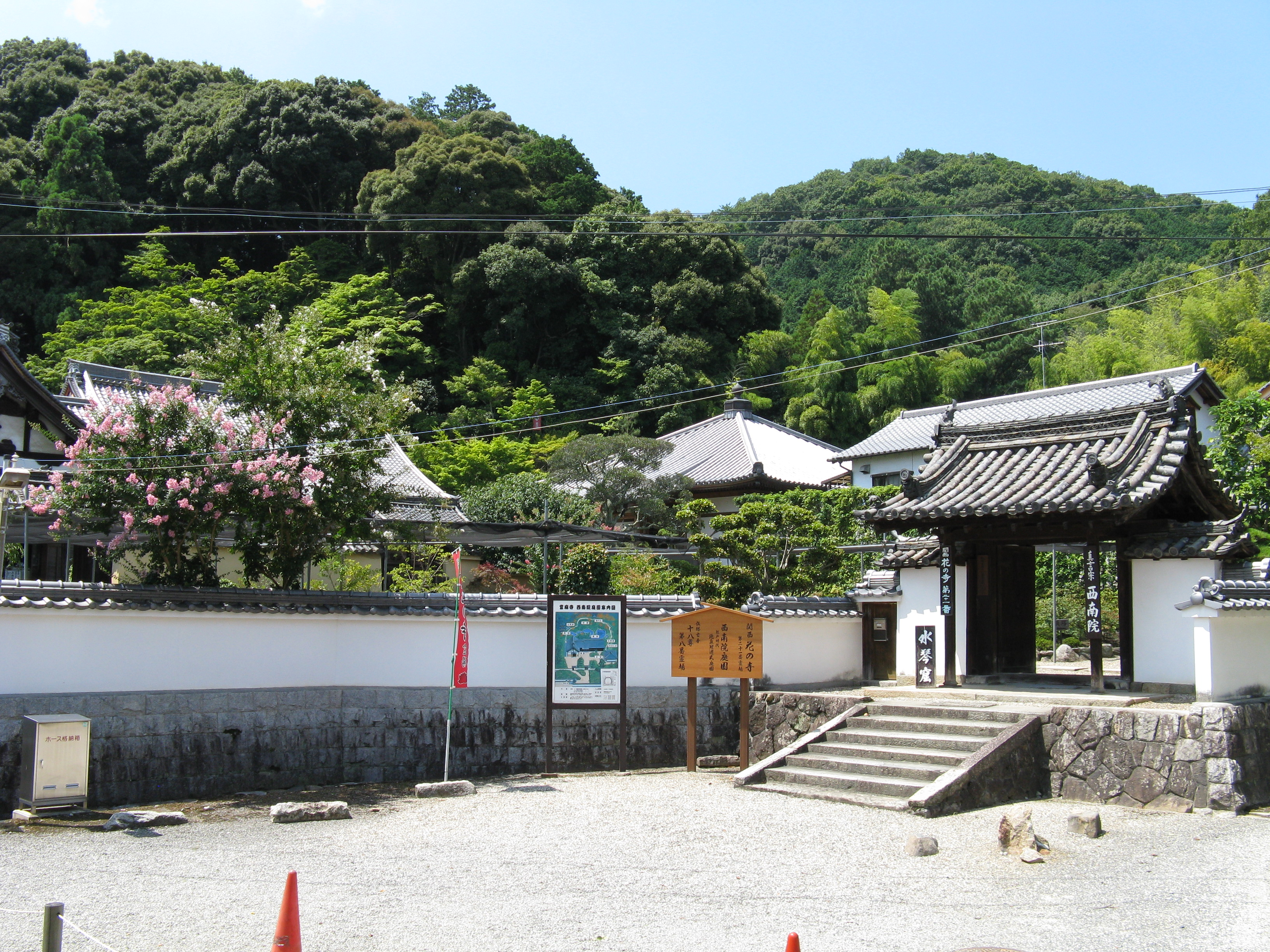
Sainan-in

== See also ==
- List of National Treasures of Japan (temples)
- List of National Treasures of Japan (crafts-others)
- List of National Treasures of Japan (sculptures)
- List of Historic Sites of Japan (Nara)
- List of Places of Scenic Beauty of Japan (Nara)
- Taema (Noh play)
