= Kihachirō Kawamoto =

Japanese anime director

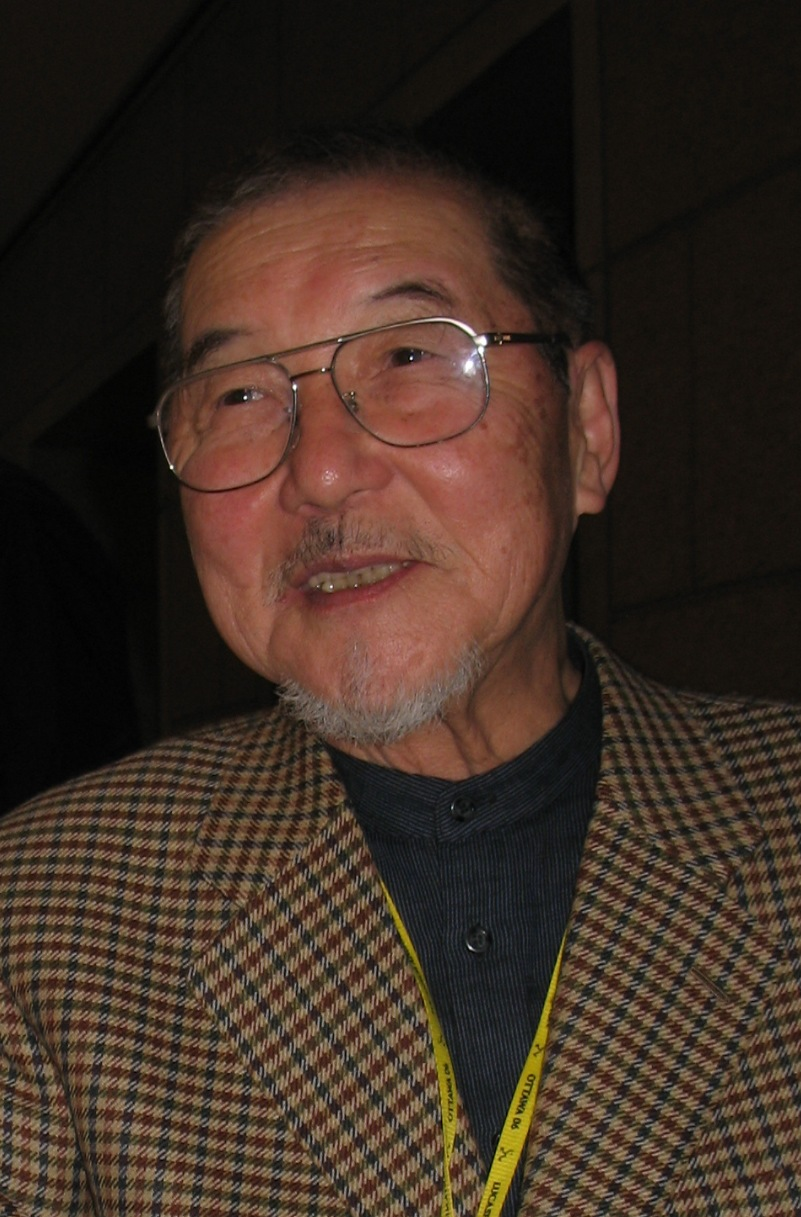
- Kihachirō Kawamoto at the Ottawa International Animation Festival in September 2006
- Born: January 11, 1925; Tokyo, Japan
- Died: August 23, 2010 (aged 85)
- Monuments: Iida City Kawamoto Kihachirō Puppet Museum
- Occupation: Director of animated films
- Years active: 1968–2005
- Style: Stop motion
- Title: President of the Japan Animation Association
- Term: 1989–2010
- Predecessor: Osamu Tezuka
- Successor: Taku Furukawa
- Awards: Winsor McCay Award; Order of the Rising Sun, Gold Rays with Rosette

Kihachirō Kawamoto (川本 喜八郎, Kawamoto Kihachirō; January 11, 1925 – August 23, 2010) was a Japanese puppet designer, independent film director, screenwriter, animator and the second president of the Japan Animation Association, succeeding founder Osamu Tezuka in 1989 and serving until his own death. He is best-remembered in Japan as designer of the puppets for the long-running NHK live action television series of the Puppet theater, the Three Kingdoms in the early 1980s and The Tale of the Heike in the 1990s but better-known internationally for his own animated short films, the majority of which are model animation but which also include the cutout animation Tabi and Shijin no Shōgai and mixed media, French-language Farce anthropo-cynique.

Since beginning his career in his early twenties as a production design assistant under So Matsuyama in the art department of Toho in 1946, he met Tadasu Iizawa and left the film studio in 1950 to collaborate with him on illustrating children's literature with photographs of dolls in dioramas, many of which have been republished in English editions by such American publishers as Grosset & Dunlap and Western Publishing's Golden Books imprint, and trained in the art of stop motion filmmaking under Tadahito Mochinaga and, later, Jiří Trnka.

He is also closely associated with Tadanari Okamoto, another independent filmmaker. They collaborated in booking private halls in which to show their films to the public as the "Puppet Animashow" in the 1970s. Okamoto's last film, The Restaurant of Many Orders (注文の多い料理店, Chūmon no Ōi Ryōriten; 1991), was left incomplete following his death during its production. Kawamoto completed the film. The film was based on Kenji Miyazawa's short story "The Restaurant of Many Orders."

== Biography ==
Born in 1925, from an early age Kawamoto was captivated by the art of doll and puppet making. After seeing the works of maestro Czech animator Jiří Trnka, he first became interested in stop motion puppet animation and during the 1950s began working alongside Japan's first puppet animator, the legendary Tadahito Mochinaga.

In 1958, he co-founded Shiba Productions to make commercial animation for television, but it was not until 1963, when he traveled to Prague to study puppet animation under Jiří Trnka for a year, that he considered his puppets to have truly begun to take on a life of their own. Trnka encouraged Kawamoto to draw on his own country's rich cultural heritage in his work, and so Kawamoto returned from Czechoslovakia to make a series of highly individual, independently produced artistic short works, beginning with Breaking of Branches is Forbidden (Hana-Ori) in 1968.

Heavily influenced by the traditional aesthetics of Nō, bunraku-style puppetry and kabuki, since the '70s his haunting puppet animations such as The Demon (Oni, 1972), Dōjōji Temple (Dōjōji, 1976) and House of Flame (Kataku, 1979) have won numerous prizes internationally. He has also produced cut-out (kirigami) animations such as Travel (Tabi, 1973) and A Poet's Life (Shijin no Shogai, 1974). In 1990 he returned to Trnka's studios in Prague to make Briar Rose, or The Sleeping Beauty.

In Japan, he is best known for designing the puppets used in the long-running TV series Puppet theater, the Three Kingdoms, which was based on the Chinese literary classic Romance of the Three Kingdoms (Sangokushi, 1982–84), and later for The Tale of the Heike (Heike Monogatari, 1993–94). In 2003, he was responsible for overseeing the Winter Days (Fuyu no Hi) project, in which 35 of the world's top animators each worked on a two-minute segment inspired by the renka couplets of celebrated poet Matsuo Bashō. The project received the Grand Prize in the Animation Division of the Japan Media Arts Festival in 2003.

The Book of the Dead (Shisha no Sho) is Kawamoto's only feature length animation, 1981's Rennyo and His Mother (Rennyo to Sono Haha) being a live-action puppet film. It had its world premiere as a part of a Special Retrospective Tribute at the 40th Karlovy Vary International Film Festival (July 1–9, 2005, Karlovy Vary, Czech Republic).

Kawamoto died of pneumonia on August 23, 2010, at the age of 85.

== Filmography ==
=== Short films ===
- Breaking of Branches is Forbidden (花折り, Hana-Ori; March 1, 1968, 14 min.)
- Anthropo-Cynical Farce (Farce anthropo-cynique, January 1, 1970, 8 min., from a story by Riichi Yokomitsu)
- The Demon (鬼, Oni; September 2, 1972, 8 min.)
- Travel (旅, Tabi; January 1, 1973, 12 min.)
- A Poet's Life (詩人の生涯, Shijin no Shōgai; January 1, 1974, 19 min., from a story by Kōbō Abe)
- Dōjōji (道成寺; June 19, 1976, 19 min., from the Nō play of the same name)
- House of Flame (火宅, Kataku; December 10, 1979, 19 min., from the Nō play Motomezuka)
- Self-Portrait (セルフポートレート, Serufu-Pōtorēto; January 1, 1988, 1 min., part of a multi-artist ASIFA project of animated self-portraits by animators)
- To Shoot without Shooting (不射之射, Fusha no Sha; January 10, 1988, 25 min., from a story by Atsushi Nakajima; coproduction with People's Republic of China made at Shanghai Animation Film Studio)
- Briar-Rose or The Sleeping Beauty (いばら姫またはねむり姫, Ibara-Hime matawa Nemuri-Hime; January 1, 1990, 22 min., from a concept by Kyōko Kishida; coproduction with Czechoslovakia made at Jiří Trnka Studio)
- Amefutakami, in the Sky (ひさかたの天二上, Hisakata no Amefutakami; 2006, 14 min.)

=== Feature films ===
- Rennyo and His Mother (蓮如とその母, Rennyo to Sono Haha; October 7, 1981, 93 min., live-action puppet film)
- Winter Days (冬の日, Fuyu no Hi; November 27, 2003, 40 min.)
- The Book of the Dead (死者の書, Shisha no Sho; October 21, 2006, 70 min., from a novel by Shinobu Orikuchi)

== DVD releases ==
=== Short films ===
Title	Format	Region	Distributor	Series	Date	Catalogue #	Subtitles
Kihachiro Kawamoto Film Works (川本喜八郎作品集, Kawamoto Kihachirō Sakuhinshū)	NTSC	All	Pioneer Corporation	New Animation Animation	2002.7.10	PIBA-3032	English, Japanese
Kihachiro Kawamoto Film Works (川本喜八郎作品集, Kawamoto Kihachirō Sakuhinshū)	NTSC	All	Geneon	New Animation Animation	2007.1.25	GNBA-3034	English, Japanese
The Exquisite Short Films of Kihachiro Kawamoto	NTSC	1	Kino International	The KimStim Collection	2008.4.22	KV623DVD	English

=== Winter Days ===
See Winter Days.

=== The Book of the Dead ===
Title	Format	Region	Distributor	Series	Date	Catalogue #	Subtitles
The Book of the Dead (死者の書, Shisha no Sho)	NTSC	2	Geneon	New Animation Animation	2007.10.24	GNBA-3062	None
The Book of the Dead	NTSC	1	Kino International	The KimStim Collection	2008.4.22	KV613DVD	English
