= Puppet theater, the Three Kingdoms =

Japanese TV puppetry series

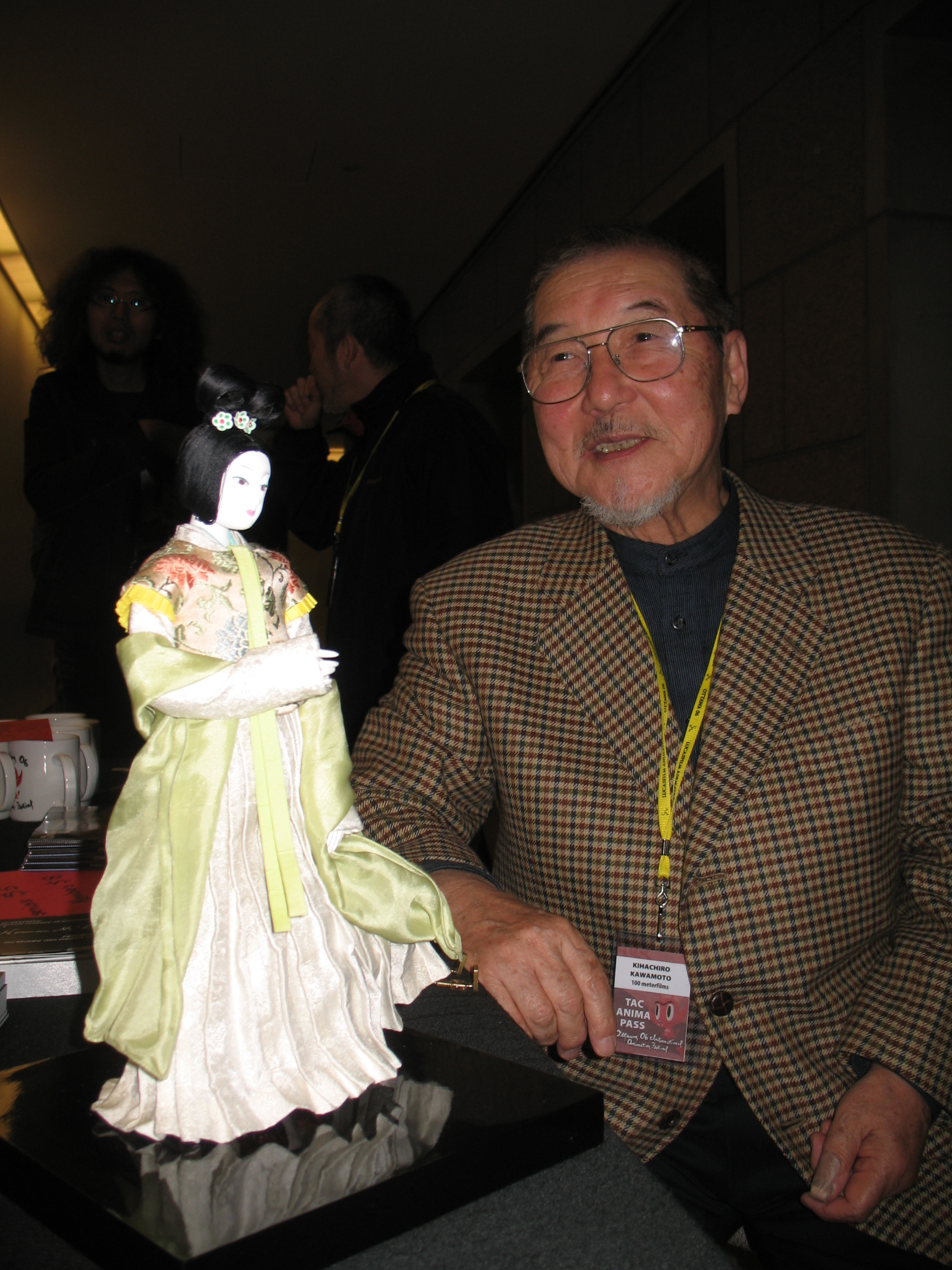
Kihachirō Kawamoto in Ottawa, 2006

Puppet theater, the Three Kingdoms (人形劇 三国志, Ningyō geki Sangokushi) is a puppet animation television program produced by NHK, Japan's national television station Nippon Hōsō Kyōkai, based on the Romance of the Three Kingdoms. All 68 episodes were broadcast on television between 1982 and 1983.

Set in ancient China in the 2nd and 3rd centuries, it depicts the exploits of the sworn brothers Liu Bei, Guan Yu, and Zhang Fei, as well as the military strategist Zhuge Liang, and the rise and fall of the Three Kingdoms of Wei, Wu, and Shu.

== Production ==
Previous NHK's puppet theaters were made for children, like Hyokkori Hyōtan Island or The Tale of Princess Prin Prin. On the other hand, Three Kingdoms was produced to appeal to adult audiences, with a script that would satisfy adults and performed by highly artistic puppets. As for music, Haruomi Hosono composed the opening and ending themes.

In terms of special effects, the use of fire and water, which had previously been definitely avoided in puppet shows for fear of damaging the puppets, was innovative. Another new attempt is the use of computer-controlled movements of the cavalry puppets. In 1982, using a computer to recreate the movements of a horse was new and difficult.

The use of professional actors as voice actors in this puppet theater was also an attempt to set it apart from past puppet theaters aimed at children. Renji Ishibashi, who played the good hero Guan Yu, was motivated to take on the role because up until then he had often played scary villains.

== Puppets ==
Puppet theater, the Three Kingdoms is well known for the puppets created by Kihachirō Kawamoto, which have been described as highly artistic. They were consciously modeled after bunraku puppets. At least 500 puppets had to be made by the end of the series. Kawamoto worked with other talented puppet makers to complete all the puppets.

Until the broadcast of this work, Kawamoto was a stop-motion animation craftsman known only to a select few, but this television show made him known to a much larger audience.
