= Taema (Noh play) =

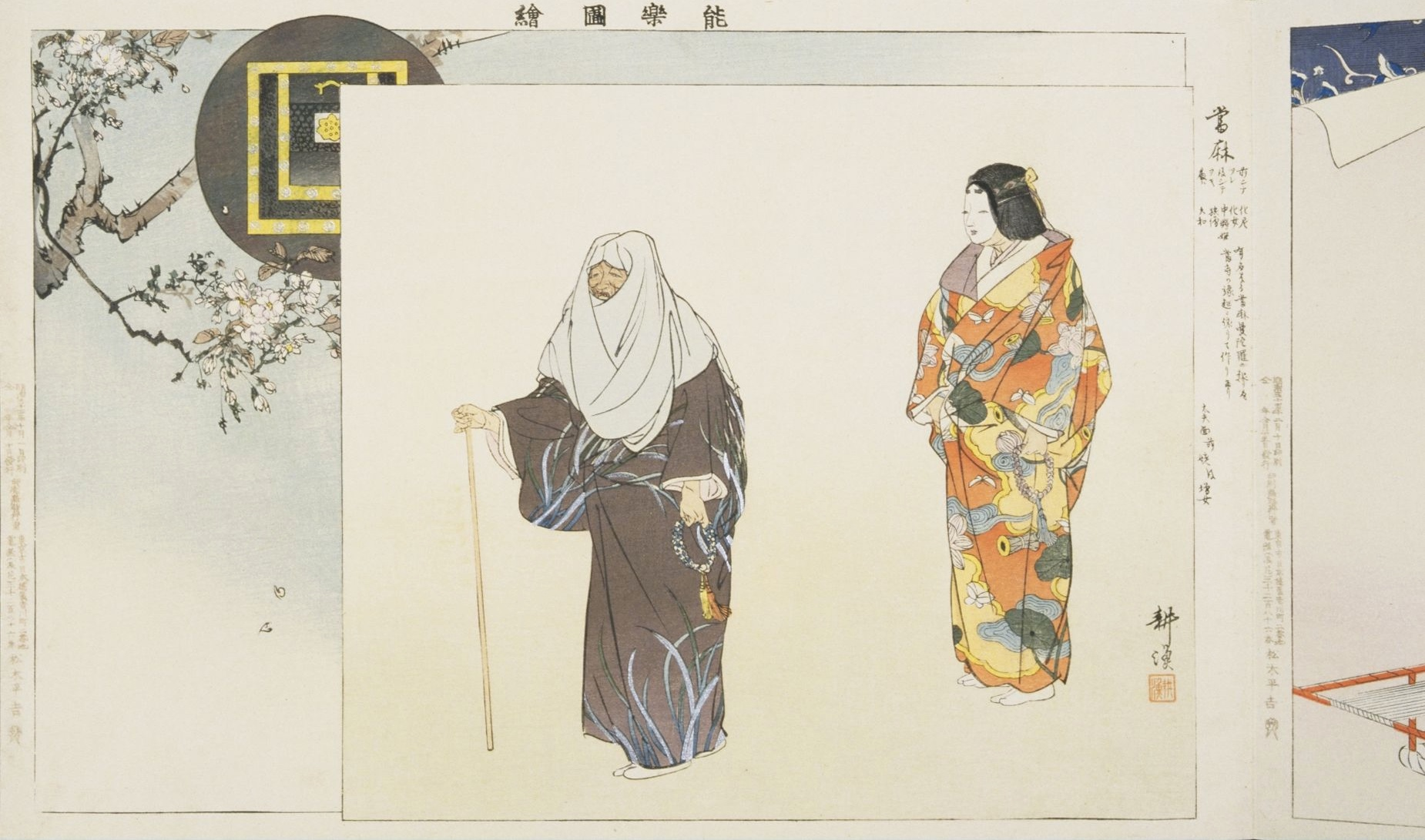
Woodblock print with a scene from Taema, by Tsukioka Kōgyo

Taema (当麻) is a Noh play of the fifth category, Kiri Noh, attributed to Zeami, and centred around the origin legend of the Taema Temple in Nara Prefecture, Japan.

== Background ==
The play draws the traditional stories of otogizoshi, with their merger of elite and popular concerns, and their focus on miracles and origin stories. In particular, it is concerned with the role of Princess Chujo-hime in creating the Taima Mandala.

== Plot ==
A relatively undramatic play, Taema recounts how an old man visits the temple and learns the legend of the Princess from an old nun, who is revealed as the Bodhisattva Kannon. Thereafter the Princess herself appears, and dances in a representation of the Pure land.

== Recent history ==
Though rarely performed, 2012 saw a performance in Japan featuring (equally rarely) a central role for a female actor.

== See also ==
- Mandala
- Pure Land Buddhism
