= Winter Days =

- Film Poster
- Directed by: Kihachirō Kawamoto
- Written by: Matsuo Bashō
- Produced by: Viktor Mayer (Czech); Tatsuo Shimamura (Japan)
- Release date: November 27, 2003 (Japan)
- Running time: 105 minutes (40 minutes animation)
- Country: Japan
- Language: Japanese

Winter Days (冬の日, Fuyu no Hi) is a 2003 Japanese anime film directed by Kihachirō Kawamoto. It is based on one of the renku (collaborative linked poems) in the 1684 collection of the same name by the 17th-century Japanese poet Bashō.

The creation of the film followed the traditional collaborative nature of the source material – the visuals for each of the 36 stanzas were independently created by 35 different animators. As well as many Japanese animators, Kawamoto assembled leading names of animation from across the world. Each animator was asked to contribute at least 30 seconds to illustrate their stanza, and most of the sequences are under a minute (Yuri Norstein's, though, is nearly two minutes long).

The released film consists of the 40-minute animation, followed by an hour-long 'Making of' documentary, including interviews with the animators. Winter Days won the Grand Prize of the Japan Media Arts Festival in 2003.

Bashō's hokku, or opening verse, of the 36-verse poem:

(kyôku) kogarashi no mi wa chikusai ni nitaru kana	(Crazy verse); In the withering wind it is Chikusai whom I resemble!

== Animated segments ==
Norstein animated the opening stanza (hokku) as the special guest (kyaku). Chikusai is running around listening to trees, and meets Bashō. He's awed, but is amused to see that Bashō is picking bugs out of a cloak that is as torn as his own. He gives Bashō his own hat in exchange for Bashō's (which has a gaping hole at the top) and goes away. Suddenly, the wind picks up and blows the torn hat away. Chikusai chases after it and manages to catch it, but then with a shrug lets it go and allows it to fly off wherever the wind will take it. Meanwhile, Bashō is moving slowly and laboriously against the wind, with a hand on his new hat to keep it from flying away.

Speaking at the November 30, 2007 Russian theatrical premiere of Winter Days, Norstein said that he had made a longer, 3-minute version of this segment, but had not yet added sound to it.

Kawamoto animated the second (waki) and final (ageku) stanzas as the organiser (shōshō).

#	Poet	Animator	Length (seconds)	Type	Country
Sheet 1 Side 1 - jo (introduction)
1	Bashō	Yuri Norstein	110	cut-out	Russia
2	Yasui	Kihachirō Kawamoto	52	puppet	Japan
3	Kakei	Fumio Oi	44	CGI	Japan
4	Jūgo	Tatsutoshi Nomura	48	cel	Japan
5	Tokoku	Shinichi Suzuki	51	cel	Japan
6	Shōhei	Haru Fukushima	47	vector animation	Japan
Sheet 1 Side 2 - ha (intensification)
7	Yasui	Tatsuya Ishida			Japan
8	Bashō	Raoul Servais			Belgium
9	Jūgo	Noriko Morita			Japan
10	Kakei	Tatsuo Shimamura			Japan
11	Bashō	Yōichi Kotabe & Reiko Okuyama			Japan
12	Tokoku	Aleksandr Petrov		paint-on-glass	Russia
13	Kakei	Maya Yonesho			Japan
14	Yasui	Yoji Kuri			Japan
15	Tokoku	Uruma Delvi			Japan
16	Jūgo	Seiichi Hayashi			Japan
17	Yasui	Azuru Isshiki			Japan
18	Bashō	Břetislav Pojar			Canada; Czech Republic
Sheet 2 Side 1 - ha (intensification)
19	Jūgo	Katsushi Boda			Japan
20	Kakei	Masahiro Katayama			Japan
21	Bashō	Mark Baker			UK
22	Tokoku	Yuichi Ito			Japan
23	Kakei	Keita Kurosaka			Japan
24	Yasui	Reiko Yokosuka			Japan
25	Tokoku	Yuko Asano			Japan
26	Jūgo	IKIF			Japan
27	Yasui	Byron Wang			China
28	Bashō	Isao Takahata			Japan
29	Jūgo	Nori Hikone			Japan
30	Kakei	Masaaki Mori			Japan
Sheet 2 Side 2 - kyū (rapid finale)
31	Bashō	Taku Furukawa			Japan
32	Tokoku	Co Hoedeman			Canada; Netherlands
33	Kakei	Jacques Drouin		pinscreen	Canada; France
34	Yasui	Fusako Yusaki			Japan
35	Tokoku	Kōji Yamamura	40		Japan
36	Jūgo	Kihachirō Kawamoto		puppet	Japan

== DVD releases ==
The film is currently available in four DVD versions, none of which has English dubbing or subtitles.

- Regular Japanese release, November 22, 2003 (R2, NTSC). Contains original film (40+65 min), no subtitles.
- "Complete Box" Japanese release, November 22, 2003 (R2, NTSC). Contains film + eight additional DVDs with making-of featurettes (total: 945 mins). No subtitles.
- Korean "RABA Animation" release, February 7, 2006 (R3, NTSC). Contains Korean subtitles; otherwise, identical to "regular" Japanese release in all but the region encoding and price.
- French release, June 20, 2008 (R2, PAL). Original animation with French audio, and 'making-of' with French sub-titles.

== See also ==
- List of films based on poems
- List of animated feature films
- List of stop-motion films
- Renku
- Matsuo Bashō
