= Kishu ryūritan =

Japanese plot archetype

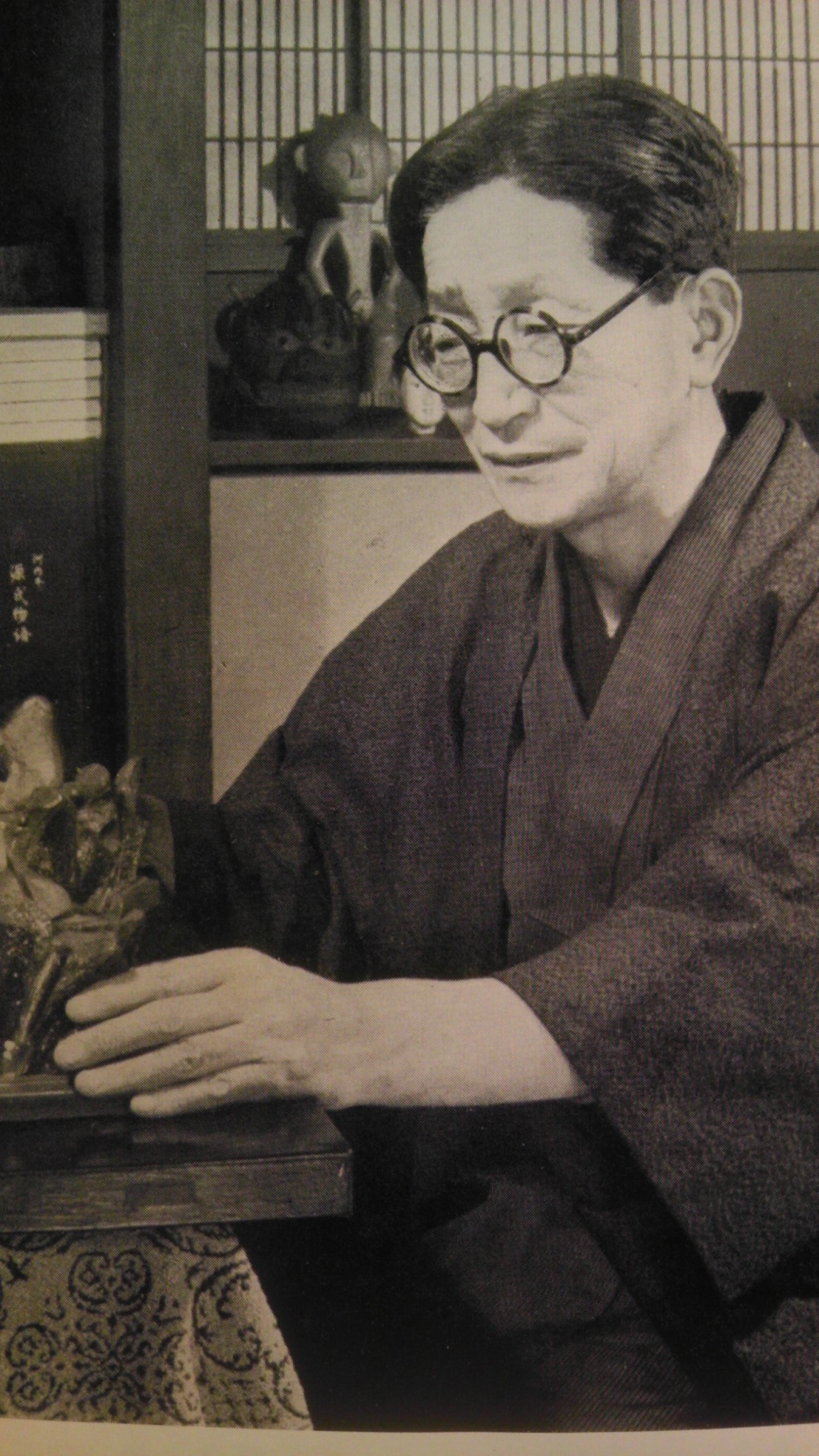
Ethnologist Shinobu Orikuchi, who originated the term kishu ryūritan in his study of the Japanese literary tradition

In Orikuchiism, kishu ryūritan (貴種流離譚, lit. "noble wandering narrative") is a plot archetype found in Japanese folklore and Japanese literature. In these narratives, a hero is exiled from their society, faces a variety of trials and ordeals, and either returns to their society in triumph or dies in exile. Though stories depicting this archetype date to as early as the classical period of Japanese history, use of the term "kishu ryūritan" to describe these kinds of stories collectively was originated by ethnologist Shinobu Orikuchi in 1918.

== Characteristics ==
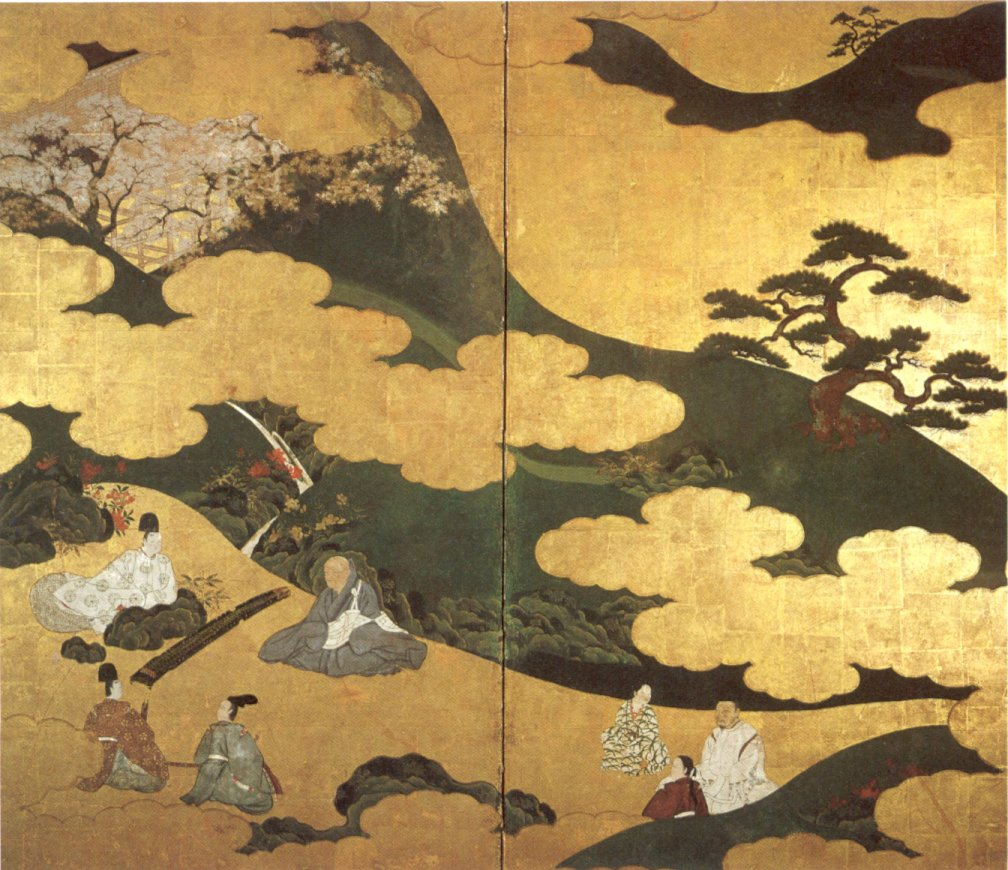
Panel by Tosa Mitsuoki depicting The Tale of Genji, a quintessential kishu ryūritan narrative

Orikuchi argued that stories about wandering nobles contain three core elements: a hero of divine birth, the theme of exile, and the movement of the protagonist from a center to a remote margin. The hero is typically a person of high social standing, such as a deity, emperor, or court noble, though stories also focus on other social classes such as criminals and pilgrims. A defining trait of a kishu ryūritan story is the manner in which the hero begins their exile as powerless, but as a result of those they encounter during their wanderings, acquire greater or even god-like powers. Orikuchi saw the archetype as representing a crucial link between early oral accounts of gods and mythical figures collected in the Kojiki, and the emergence of more formalized Japanese historical and literary traditions.

The kishu ryūritan archetype is especially common in stories of the Heian era. Notable examples include The Tale of Genji, The Tales of Ise, The Tale of the Bamboo Cutter, and the legends of Ōkuninushi and Yamato Takeru. Orikuchi argues that kishu ryūritan reached its apex in The Tale of Genji, after which changing social conditions lead to a decline in variants and new expressions of the archetype.

== Origins of the term ==
Shinobu Orikuchi's earliest use of kishu ryūritan was in 1918, in the book Aigo no Waka (愛護若). (Note: Some sources, like Dix 2009, p. 286 credits Orikuchi's earliest use to 1924 in his book Nihon Bungaku no Hassei Josetsu.) He later wrote about it in the 1924 book Nihon Bungaku no Hassei Josetsu (日本文学の発生序説, An Introduction to the Emergence of Japanese Literature). In Nihon Bungaku no Hassei Josetsu, Orikuchi attempted to connect the various strands he believed formed the Japanese literary tradition. He argued that the kishu ryūritan archetype was a link between early oral tradition and archaic myths to later literary narratives. Sociologist Tōru Takahashi noted a similarity between Orikuchi's theory and the 1920 essay Nagasare-ō (流され王) by his mentor Kunio Yanagita. In turn, Jonathan Stockdale argues that Heinrich Heine's 1853 work "Die Götter im Exil" may have influenced Yanagita's essay.

== Criticism ==
While critics have concurred with Orikuchi's general analysis of Japanese literature, some have questioned whether kishu ryūritan represents a uniquely Japanese archetype as distinct from other expressions of the hero's journey across cultures. Jonathan Stockdale argues that while Orikuchi correctly identifies the exiled noble as a common motif in Japanese literature, Orikuchi's analysis reveals "an ongoing quest to uncover the origins of a purely Japanese identity, untainted by 'foreign' influence", an approach that is typical of the Kokugaku movement that neglects Chinese and Korean contributions to this archetypal story. Theologian Alain Rocher argued that the link to Japanese mythology was "often somewhat doubtful" and that the hero's descent and exile was only an "extremely tenuous link" between the Kojiki and later stories.
