= Chūjō-hime =

Japanese politician

- Chūjō-hime and the spirit of her wicked stepmother, represented as a snake. The lotuses are a reference to the Lotus Thread embroidery she wove. Woodblock print by Yoshitoshi

Folk tale
- Name: Chūjō-hime
- Also known as: Chūjōhime
- Country: Japan
- Origin Date: 8th Century
- Related: Cinderella

Chūjō-hime (中将姫, Chūjō-hime; Middle Captain Princess) (also written Chūjō Hime or Hase-Hime) (c. 753?–781?) was by most accounts a daughter of the court noble Fujiwara no Toyonari who escaped persecution at the hands of her stepmother by becoming a nun at the Taima-dera in Nara. There she took on the name Zenshin-ni or the Dharma name Honyo (法如). She has become a folk heroine, the subject of numerous Japanese folktales which celebrate her filial piety. She is sometimes called the Japanese Cinderella.

== Folklore ==
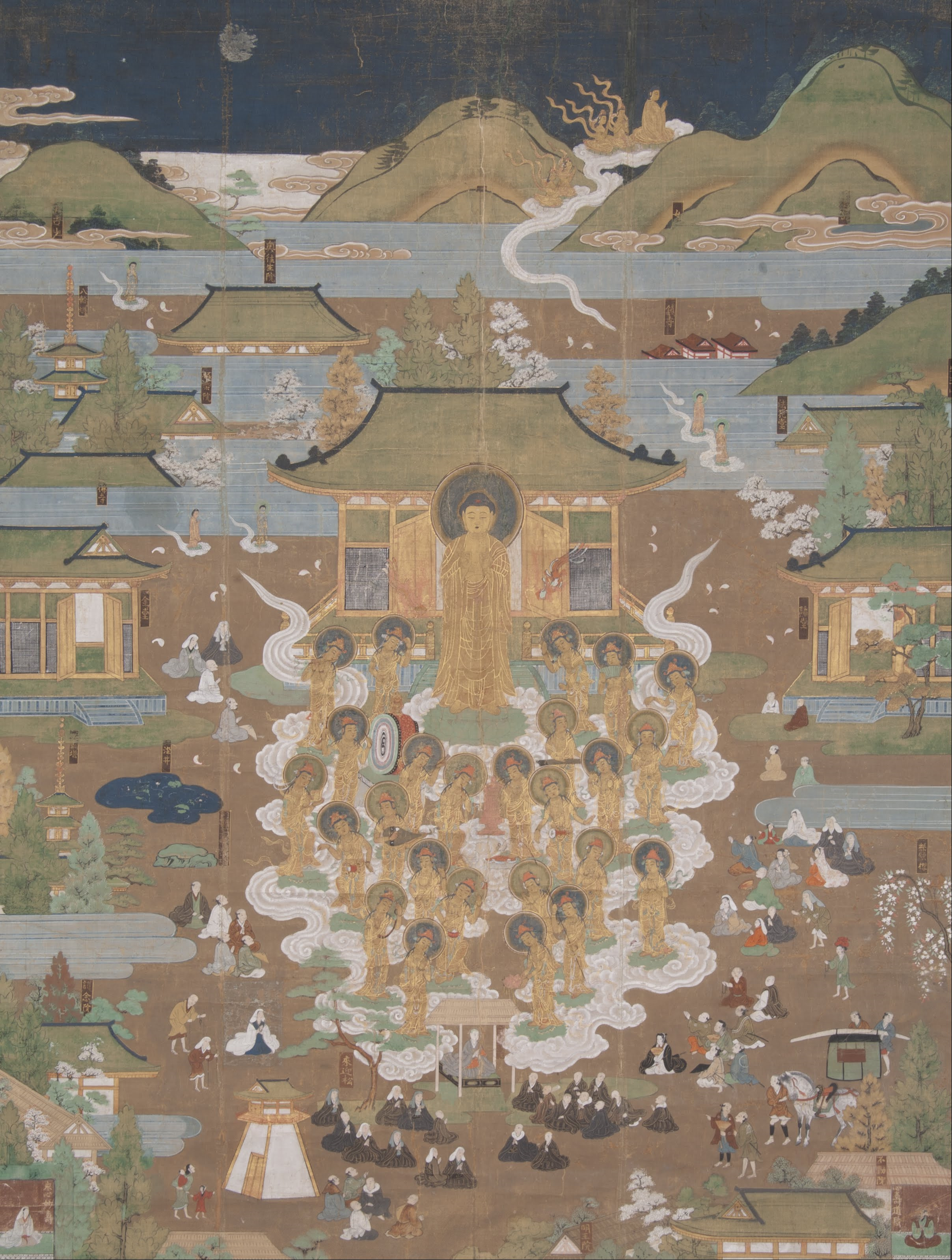
Amitābha welcomes Chūjō-hime to the Western Paradise. Japan, 16th century.

She is said to be the daughter of an imperial minister of the Fujiwara clan and a royal princess. Different stories disagree on her date of birth: most place it in the 8th century, during Emperor Shōmu's reign, and suggest she was the daughter of Fujiwara no Toyonari; however, a few state she was the daughter of Fujiwara no Toyoshige, a century earlier. It is said that the childless couple had appealed to Kannon and been granted a daughter in exchange for the life of one parent. When Chūjō-hime is three, therefore, her mother dies; her father subsequently remarries.

In some versions of the story, her stepmother then orders her taken into the mountains and abandoned to die. In others, she remains at home and makes copies of the Buddhist sutras for her mother's salvation, and this devotion earns the enmity of her stepmother. In either case, she is rescued by the Buddhist nuns of Taima-dera and becomes a nun herself. As a nun, she lives an austere and meditative life, and comes to be known as a "living Buddha." She is credited with inventing the art of embroidery during this time.

Chūjō-hime is credited with weaving the Lotus Thread, Taima Mandala, a mandala depicting the cosmography of the Pure Land. It is said that she managed this miracle in a single night. Some versions of the story say that she was aided in the task by an apparition of Amida Butsu in response to her prayers. Other beliefs hold that she was herself an incarnation of Kannon.

=== Evolution of Chūjō-hime's legend ===
The earliest mention of Chūjō-hime and her association with the origin of the Taima Mandala dates back to the thirteenth century in the form of a handscroll painting titled Taima Mandara engi emaki. In the text accompanying the handscroll, she is referred to as "Yokohagi's no Otodo's daughter." She is then mentioned by name in the pictorial and calligraphic work Ippen Hijiri-e, dated 1299. This text also identifies Chūjō-hime as "an incarnation of a Buddhist deity." Both of these texts depict Chūjō-hime's legend in a more traditional form, focusing primarily on her days as a nun in Taima-dera and her deity status. Later depictions would elaborate on her life before she became a nun.

The religious connotations of the Chujō-hime tale became increasingly prevalent in the 14th-15th centuries with the contributions of traveling pastors using her story to spread Buddhist teachings. Monk Yūjo Shōsō included details concerning Chujō-Hime's tale in Commentary on the Taima Mandala (1436) in which she travels to Hibariyama after her step-mother orders her death. This tale came in conjunction with the proselytization of nuns traveling along the Kumano pilgrimage, who spread oral tales (etoki) of Chujō-hime that emphasized female salvation. Through these etoki Hibariyama came to be associated with Tokushō-ji temple in Arita city which was a stop along the Kumano pilgrimage.

During the late fourteenth and early fifteenth centuries, new themes were added to Chūjō-hime's story, particularly regarding her life before becoming a nun. This new retelling of the legend took the shape of Nō plays.

One such play was Hibariyama (Skylark Mountain, writer unknown). The first act tells how Chūjō-hime's father, Minister Toyonari, ordered one of his retainers to kill his daughter, after having believed a lie about her. The retainer then takes Chūjō-hime to Mount Hibari with the intention of killing her, but, unable to do so, he instead builds a shelter for her and her nurse.

In the second act, some time has passed and Chūjō-hime's father has realized that the rumors of his daughter were untrue and has come to regret his actions. He then encounters Chūjō-hime and, upon learning that she is alive and well, they reunite, and he takes Chūjō-hime back home. Hibariyama does not make any mention of Chūjō-hime's time as a nun.

Another Nō play that develops Chūjō-hime's legend is Taema, attributed to the playwright Zeami. In this retelling, Chūjō-hime is abandoned in Mount Hibari by her wicked stepmother. Despite the harsh conditions of the mountains, she survives, and this is attributed to her being the reincarnation of a Buddha. She is later found by her father Lord Toyonari, who takes her back home. Chūjō-hime, however, uninterested in worldly affairs, leaves the capital and becomes a nun at Taima-dera. Although this play focuses on her time before entering the Taima-dera, this play also includes the miracle of the mandala. An apparitional nun appears and helps mount the mandala and preaches to Chujo-hime about its meaning. The nun reveals herself as Amida and promises Chujo-hime entry into the Pure Land in 13 years time. Unlike the original narrative told by Lady Nijō, in this play the weaving of the mandala is not just attributed to Chujō-hime's piousness, but instead on her desire to see her mother's final resting place. When she passes on, she reaches the Pure Land in a female form.

=== Relics ===
Besides the mandala, there are many purported relics of Chujō-hime that traveled across the Yamato region during the 15th century, mostly by accounts of monk Yūzen. These included handscrolls, ink brushes and statues that were attributed to Chujō-hime. Statues of Chujō-hime as a nun are mostly dated to the 17th century, however there are regional claims that some were carved by Chujō-hime herself. One such statue, housed at Seirenji in Uda-gun, Nara prefecture became the principal object of worship at this Pure Land sect convent.

== In popular culture ==
There is a 1911 short silent film, starring Matsunosuke Onoe, based upon Chūjō-hime's legend.

She is cast as the main female character in the 1939 novel Shisha no sho by Shinobu Orikuchi.

In the late Muromachi period the Chujō-hime tale was also used to popularize the gynecological patent medicine known as Chūjōtō which was produced by the pharmaceutical drug company, Tsumura Juntendō. In the otogizōshi versions of the Chujō-hime tale, her concern with her dead mother's salvation is what allowed her character to rise to the status of sainthood. Marketing for Chūjōtō focused on the connection between menstruation and sin.

== See also ==
- Cinderella
- Hachikazuki
- Kannon
