= Shinobu Orikuchi =

Japanese folklorist, novelist and poet

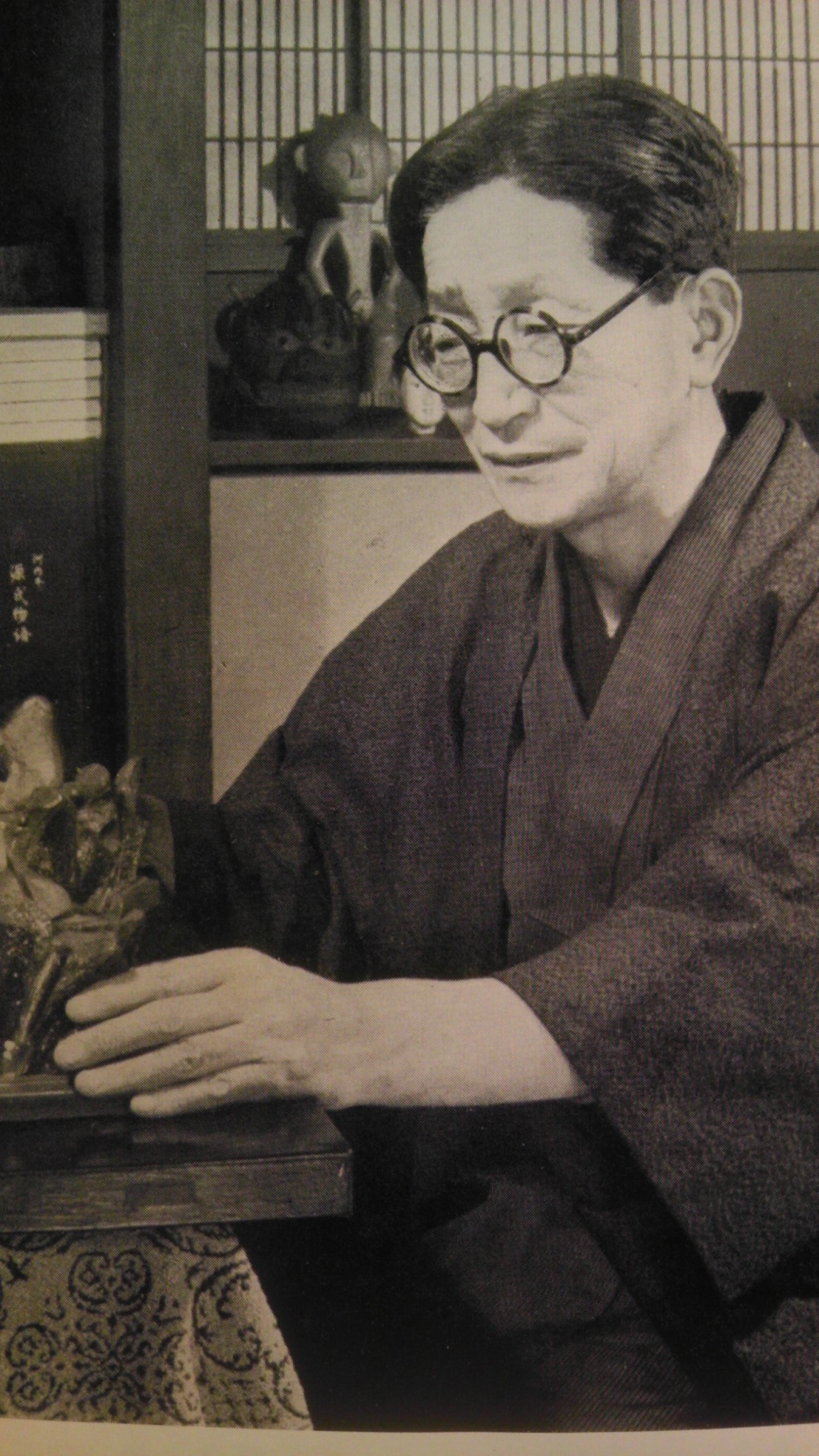
- Born: February 11, 1887; Japan Osaka
- Died: September 3, 1953 (aged 66)
- Other name: 折口 信夫 (a pen name:釋 迢空)
- Education: Kokugakuin University (Bachelor of Letters, Doctor of Letters)
- Occupations: ethnologist, linguist, folklorist, novelist, and poet
- Partner: Harumi Orikuchi

Japanese name
- Kanji: 折口 信夫
- Hiragana: おりくち しのぶ
Transcriptions
- Romanization: Orikuchi Shinobu

Shinobu Orikuchi (折口 信夫, Orikuchi Shinobu; 11 February 1887–3 September 1953), also known as Chōkū Shaku (釋 迢空, Shaku Chōkū), was a Japanese ethnologist, linguist, folklorist, novelist, and poet. As a disciple of Kunio Yanagita, he established an original academic field named "Orikuchiism" (折口学, Orikuchigaku), which is a mixture of Japanese folklore, Japanese classics, and Shintō. He produced many works in a diversity of fields covering the history of literature, folkloric performing arts, folklore itself, Japanese language, the classics study, Shintōology, ancient study, and so on. Yukio Mishima once called him the "Japanese Walter Pater".

== Biography ==
Orikuchi was born in the former Nishinari, Ōsaka (now part of Naniwa-ku, Osaka). After graduating with a degree in Japanese literature from Kokugakuin University in 1910, he started to teach Japanese and Chinese classics at junior high schools. In 1919, he was employed as a part-time instructor in Kokugakuin University. In 1922, he was promoted to professor. In 1924, he was hired as a professor at Keio University as well; afterward, he taught at two different universities until he died. As a poet, he and Kitahara Hakushu established a tanka magazine called Nikkō ("Sunshine") in 1924. In 1925, he published Between the Sea and the Mountains (海山の間, Umi Yama no Aida), his first tanka book, which is highly esteemed.

In 1934, he received a doctorate for his study on the Man'yōshū. He also established the Japan Folklorists Society (日本民俗協会). As a folklorist, Yanagita was known for rejecting every sexual subject; Orikuchi, in contrast, was very open-minded to these matters. He became a model for the protagonist in Mishima's short story Mikumano Mōde (三熊野詣), while his novel Shisha no Sho was the basis for a film by Kihachiro Kawamoto.

== Personal life ==
Orikuchi was a homosexual (nanshokuka). Harumi Orikuchi (折口春洋), scholar of Japanese literature and poet, was his de facto partner. Harumi died in the Battle of Iwo Jima.

== Major works ==
- Umi Yama no Aida (海やまのあひだ, "Between The Sea And The Mountains") – Tanka book
- Haru no Kotobure (春のことぶれ, "The Spring Forerunner") – Tanka book
- Shisha no Sho (死者の書, "The Book of the Dead") – Novel, translated into English in 2016 by Jeffrey Angles (ISBN 978-0816688104)
- Kodai Kenkyū (古代研究, "The Ancient Study") – Treatise on folklore and literature in ancient Japan
- Kabuki San (かぶき讃, "Viva Kabuki") – Kabuki review

=== Spanish translations ===
- Entre el mar y las montañas (Umi Yama no Aida).Translated by Leonel Flores. Santiago, Inti ediciones (2026).

== See also ==
- Kishu ryūritan

== Sources ==
- 加藤守雄『わが師折口信夫』朝日新聞社(1967)
- 諏訪春雄『折口信夫を読み直す』講談社現代新書(1994)
- 山折哲雄、穂積生萩『執深くあれ 折口信夫のエロス』小学館(1997)
- 富岡多恵子『釈迢空ノート』岩波書店(2000)
- 安藤礼二『神々の闘争 折口信夫論』講談社(2004)
