= Katsushi Boda =

Japanese stop motion animator

Katsushi Boda (Japanese: 保田 克史) (sometimes spelled 'Bowda') is a Japanese stop motion animator. He is most famous for creating the character Robot Palta.

While much of his work is for advertisements, he has made several works of independent animation, including Pulsar (1990), Form of Stress (1992), Robot Apartments (ja:ロボットパルタ) (1994 anime series), and Kiadoryoku REAL (1998). Many of his films feature a gear motif, and utilize pixilation and replacement-series animation.

In 1999 his film Kiadoryoku REAL won the Special Jury Prize in the Off Theatre Competition at the 10th Yubari International Fantastic Film Festival.

In 2003, he participated in the collaborative project Winter Days.
