= Taima mandala =

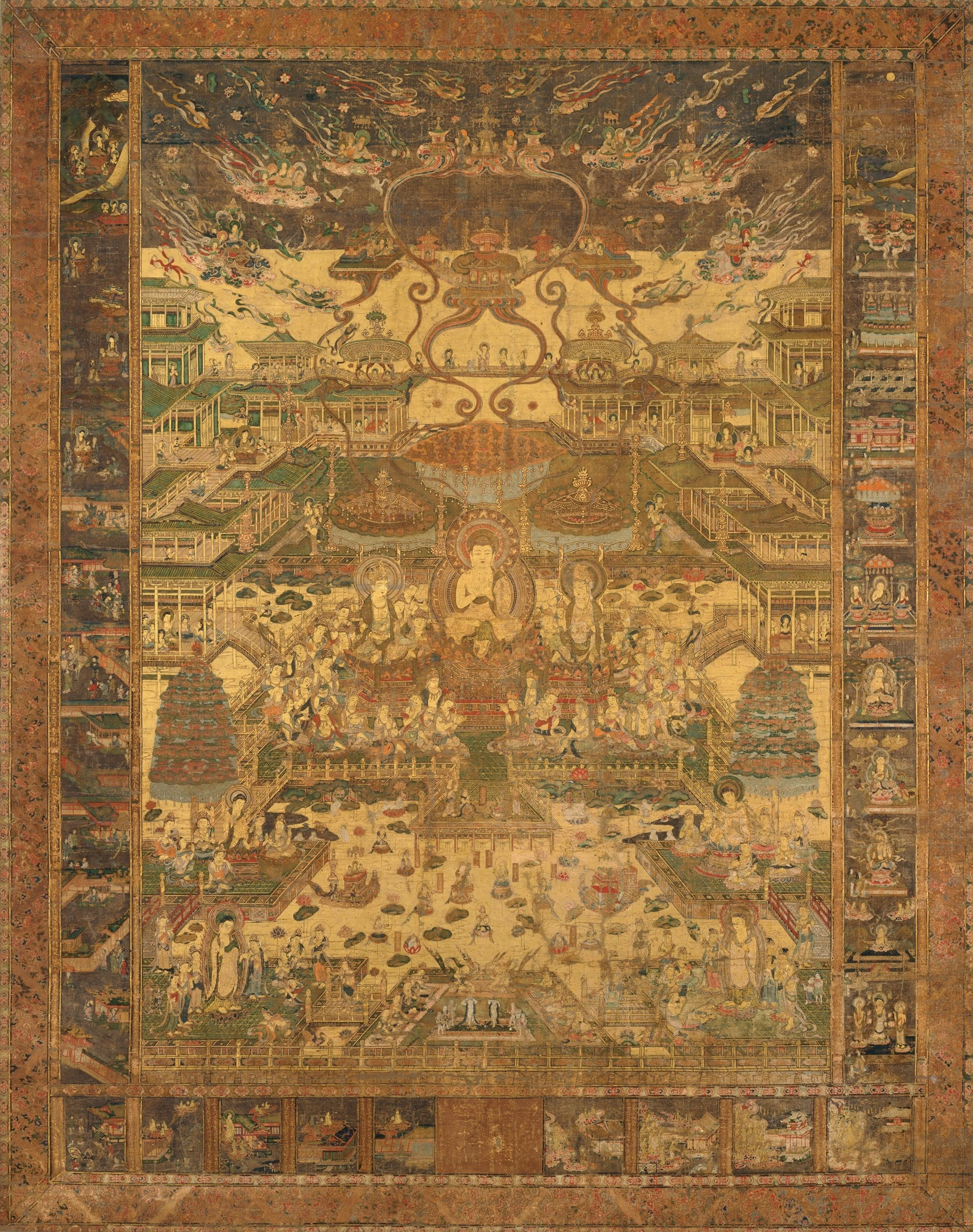
14th-century copy of the Taima Mandala. Japan, Kamakura period

The Taima Mandala (當麻曼荼羅,綴織当麻曼荼羅図) is an 8th century mandala in Japanese Pure Land Buddhism. It depicts Sukhavati, the western Pure Land, with the Buddha Amitābha (Japanese: Amida) in the center. The original copy was made around 763 AD, and is currently kept at Taima-dera temple in Nara. Many copies have been made since, and the original work has degraded considerably.

According to popular legend, Chūjō-hime witnessed the creation of the mandala, crafted from fibers of lotus stems by two nuns who were thought to be Amida and Kannon in disguise. The imagery on the painting is largely based on the Sutra of the Contemplation of Amitayus, and has been the subject of several doctrinal commentaries in Japanese Buddhism.

The mandala was designated a national treasure of Japan on April 27, 1961.

== Description ==
The central image is Sukhavati, the Pure Land of the west. The left, right, and lower borders are lined with images from the Contemplation Sutra. The central image, called the Court of Essential Doctrine, depicts the Amida Buddha surrounded by his worshippers that have reached enlightenment, buildings, and the land that exists in his Paradise. At the top of the central image there are many figures floating in the sky on clouds. Each of these figures have the distinctive characteristic of a halo behind their heads. This detail is a signifier that each of them have achieved enlightenment. Alongside of them are various birds flying about, scarves floating in the air, and some lotus flowers. All the figures, scarves, and birds all float towards the center of the image.

Below the floating figures, in the center, near the top of the image, there are images of buildings that appear to look like temples or palaces floating in the sky, as well. These floating buildings lead down to what appears to be an indoor garden surrounded by more buildings, this time located to the ground. These buildings are designed after eighth-century Chinese Palaces. Each of these buildings, as well as the trees in the garden, are made of the seven precious substances–gold, silver, lapis lazuli, rock crystal, coral, agate, and mother-of-pearl. Throughout the palaces are more enlightened figures meditating.

Most Chinese palaces are raised on a platform as their foundation. The structural beams are primarily used to support the roof of the building. They are connected to directly to each other due to the brackets. The walls are either curtained or door panels to define the rooms or to enclose the building. In the Taima, the buildings display a sweeping roof. This type of roof holds a sweeping curve that raises the corners of the roofs.

In the very center of this image is what appears to be a dock in the middle of a lotus pond. On this dock, there are three figures seated on lotus thrones surrounded by many meditating enlightened figures. All three of these figures are bigger than the rest throughout the image, but the centered one is the largest of them all. The centered figure is known as Amida, the deity of the Western Paradise. The figure to each of his sides are known as bodhisattvas, people who have reached enlightenment, but stayed on earth to teach the ways of the Buddha to help others reach their enlightenment. These two figures are the bodhisattva Kannon and bodhisattva Seishi.

Surrounding the middle dock holding Amida are several smaller docks, all connected to the centered dock, each holding more meditating figures. In the pond itself are boats and lotus flowers. Upon close examination, one can see many figures being born from the lotus flowers. These are people who have reached enlightenment and are being welcomed into the Western Paradise. The boats are there to bring the enlightened figures to land so they can continue their worship.

The left border (the Court of Prefatory Legend) shows, first, the discovery of the Sutra on Vulture Peak at the top, and then illustrates the introduction of the Sutra, from the bottom upward: Prince Ajasatru's temptation, the imprisonment of his father and then his mother, and Queen Vaidehi's prayers answered by Shakyamuni Buddha. Shakyamuni transmits the knowledge of the Pure Land to his disciple in the last panel, second from the top.

Queen Vaidehi was given the task to meditate and visualize the elements that represented of the western paradise, illustrated in the right border. This is called Thirteen Meditational Contemplations (The Jozengzi). The elements are as shown:

1. The Sun 2. The Moon 3. The Lapis Lazuli (Jeweled Realm of the Western Paradise) 4. The Trees of Paradise 5. The Lakes of Paradise 6. The Multi-storied Jeweled Towers of Paradise 7. Amida's Jeweled Lotus Throne 8. The Amida Triad 9. The Great Body of Amida 10. Amida in Half-lotus Position 11. The Bodhisattva Shishi 12. Imagining oneself reborn in Paradise 13. The Small Body of Amida

The bottom border illustrate the nine levels of birth. This is described as the Court of General Meditations (Sanzengi). This is an extension of the Thirteen Meditational Concentrations. The General Meditations are three levels of rebirth that are subdivided into three degrees (six births total). These births include from middle birth to upper degree to the upper birth of the lower degree (higher ranks closer to center of pond), and middle birth to lower degree and the lower birth of the lower degree (enclosed in the calyxes of lotus flowers further away from Amida). Surrounding the borders to the ends of the hanging scroll are designs of lotus flowers. Each lotus is painted with small and careful details to help make the images stand out.

== See also ==
- List of National Treasures of Japan (paintings)
- List of National Treasures of Japan (crafts-others)
- Taema (Noh play)
