= Separation Edict =

Law from 16th century Japan

The Separation Edict (身分統制令, Mibun Tōsei Rei, literally the “Social Status Control Edict”) was a law composed of three articles which was promulgated by Toyotomi Hideyoshi on 8 October 1591, the 19th year of the Tensho era during the Azuchi–Momoyama period.

== Summary of contents ==
The law prohibits samurai and their retainers the buke hokonin, which were in turn divided into the chugen and the komono, from becoming peasants or merchants, and also bans peasants from abandoning their fields to engage in commerce or wage labor and warriors from employing buke hokonin who fled from their original masters. It lays down punishments for those who violate these provisions. Its purpose was to ensure stable revenue from the land tax and a pool of warriors in view of the imminent invasion of Korea.

== Translation of the Edict ==
1. Townspeople and farmers should investigate if any samurai, chugen, or komono have become merchants or farmers since the expedition against Date Masamune in Oshu in the seventh month of last year. If any such people are found, they must be expelled. If any such people are hidden, the entire village will be punished.

2. If any peasant abandons his fields and engages in commerce or wage labor, not only the farmer himself but his fellow villagers will be punished. Those not involved in either military service or working the fields will be investigated and expelled. If an official does not execute these instructions, he will have his lands seized for negligence. If there is any concealment by townspeople or farmers, the whole county or town will be held accountable.

3. Do not employ anyone who has left his former master without permission whether he is a samurai or a komono. Thoroughly investigate an individual's background to ensure he has not done so. If he has done so, he shall be arrested and handed back to his former master. If this law is ignored or if a violator of the law is deliberately released then it is ordered that two or three people will be decapitated in the violator's place and their heads will be delivered to his former master. If this order is not carried out the person who sought to employ the violator will be punished.

== Theory of Shosaku Takagi ==
Though the Separation Edict was widely considered to be the law that first established the rigid class system of the subsequent Tokugawa shogunate based on the four occupations, Japanese historian Shosaku Takagi has called this into question. He believes that during this period of history the word "samurai" did not refer to warriors, but rather to the wakato, who were retainers of warriors just like the chugen and the komono. Takagi thus believes that the draconian social class structures imposed by the Separation Edict were actually intended specifically for the buke hokonin, including the wakato, chugen, and komono, and not for most of the individuals engaged in military service. According to this theory, the feudal class structure in Japan was in fact not legally mandated in 1591, but much later in the Edo period. However, Takagi acknowledges that the portions of the Edict relating to the peasantry did contribute to class separation.

Takagi's theory has now become mainstream, and several Japanese encyclopedias published by Yamakawa Shuppansha, Heibonsha, and others state that the word "samurai" in the text of this law refers to wakatō. In addition, the theory that the Tokugawa Shogunate established a strict class system of four occupations has been replaced by a new theory since the 1990s, and the traditional class chart has been removed from all Japanese history textbooks. According to the new theory, the hierarchy of peasants, artisans, and merchants was only a theoretical aspect of Neo-Confucianism, and in the actual operation of the shogunate, the three classes were not a hierarchy but an occupational classification.

== See also ==
- Sword hunt
- Population Census Edict
- Four occupations
