= Population Census Edict =

The Population Census Edict (人掃令, Hitobarai Rei) was a law promulgated in the name of Kampaku Toyotomi Hidetsugu in 1592, the first year of the Bunroku era during the Azuchi–Momoyama period. It is known in Japanese as the Hitobarai Rei or Ninbetsu Aratame.

The edict ordered a complete national census that was submitted in a document stating the number of households in each village and the gender, approximate age, and profession of their inhabitants. Its purpose was said to be gauging the nation's military potential and the number of laborers that could be mobilized for Hideyoshi's invasion of Korea. The Population Census Edict also had clauses in common with the Separation Edict that had been issued the previous year in 1591 and it contributed to the process of socially separating of the warrior class and peasant class. It thus can be seen as part of both Hideyoshi's policy of expansion into Asia and his policy of strengthening the social class structure.

Although it was recorded in the historical document Chronicles of the Kikkawa Clan that the Population Census Edict was promulgated in 1591, more recent research has called this into question and most experts now agree on 1592 as the correct date.

== See also ==
- Separation Edict
