= Samurai =

Professional warrior class in Japan

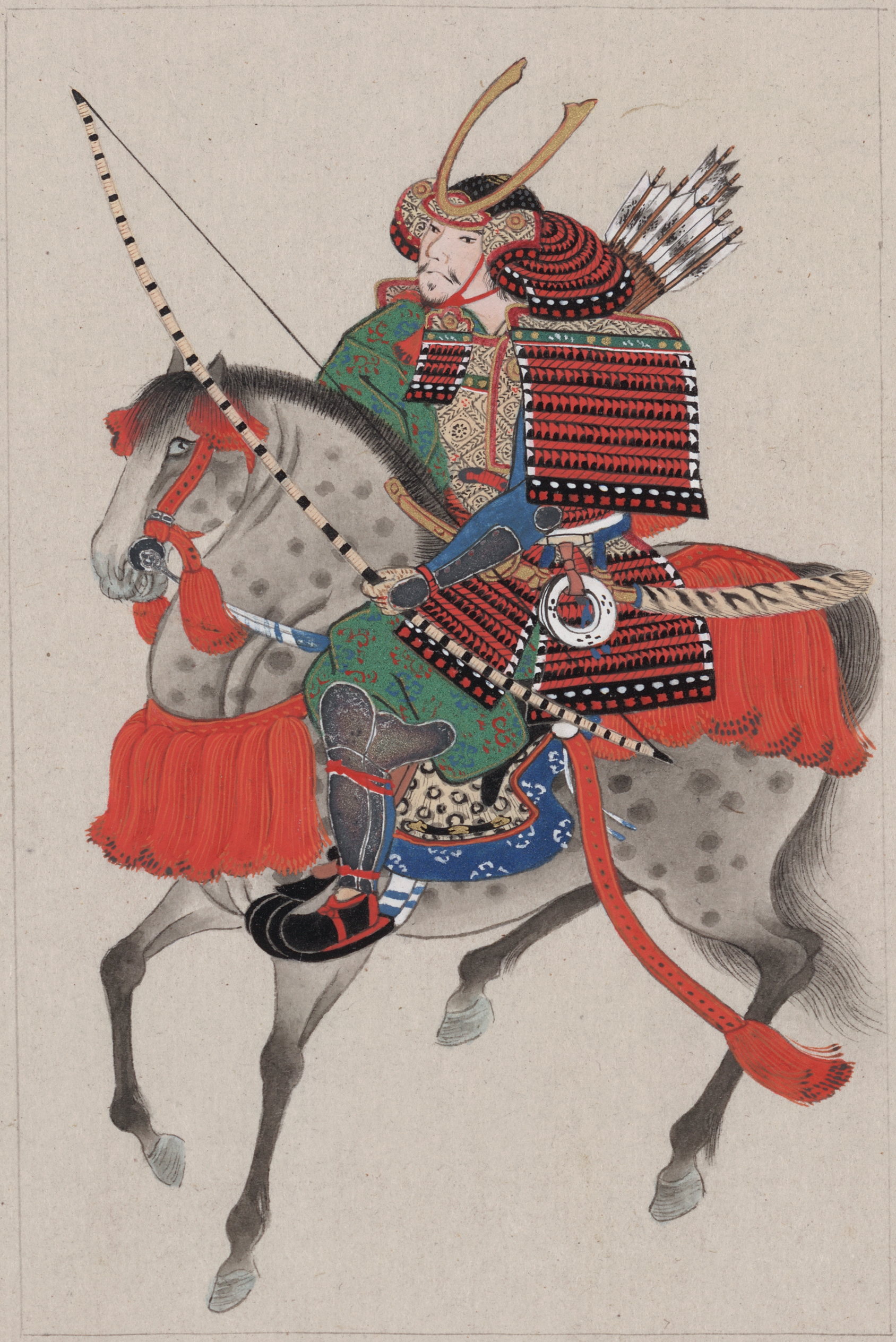
The mounted archer represented the quintessential samurai.

The samurai (侍) were members of the professional warrior class in pre-industrial Japan, who served as retainers to the lords. These men came from warrior families and trained from a young age in military arts through private instruction. Swordsmanship, archery, and horsemanship were the primary martial skills; and often in Japanese history, only samurai had the right to even possess these weapons. These weapons required years of training to master, and this commitment made the samurai superior to conscripts and militia, the latter who were typically given only days of training. The samurai also studied literature, calligraphy, and Confucian philosophy, befitting their roles as bureaucrats under the shoguns.

The role of the samurai changed over time. In the medieval period, warriors were closely associated with military service, landholding, lord-vassal ties, and local authority. Under the Tokugawa shogunate, prolonged peace and domain government transformed the warrior estate into a hereditary status and administrative class. Many samurai served as officials, police, teachers, or domain administrators while retaining privileges such as stipends, status distinction, access to office, and the right to bear arms. After the Meiji Restoration, the abolition of the domains, conscription, the commutation and abolition of hereditary stipends, and the removal of privileges such as sword-wearing dismantled the institutional basis of samurai status; former samurai feudal lords were reorganized as kazoku (nobility) along with court nobles, while most former warriors became shizoku. These classes remained legally recognized until 1947; in the 1918 census, kazoku and shizoku accounted for approximately 0.01% and 4.06% of the population, respectively.

== Terminology ==
The proper Japanese term for a professional warrior is "bushi" (武士) and the word "buke" (武家) meant "warrior family (or families)".

The word "samurai" is thought to come from the word "saburau" and means "one who serves [their lord]", and therefore the samurai are generally defined as retainers or vassals. The warlords who ruled Japan (the daimyo and the shogun) were members of the bushi class but were not referred to as samurai.

English scholars frequently treat samurai and bushi as synonyms. In translating Japanese texts, "bushi" (武士) often gets translated to samurai.

A ronin was a samurai who had lost his master. He could no longer be properly called a samurai as he served nobody, but he did retain some rights as a warrior such as the right to carry weapons and use a surname.

== Rise, transformation, and dissolution ==
=== Rise of the warrior clans (700 - 1180 AD) ===
Illustrated Tale of the Heiji Rebellion detail depicting early Minamoto warriors in 1160 AD

Up until the late 8th century AD, Japan had a national conscript army. As peace settled in, the imperial court began dismantling the system, eventually ending it by 792 AD. Conscripts were seen as unreliable and poorly trained, to be used only when there were not enough professional warriors to deal with a formidable enemy, such as when the Chinese invaded. Conscript footsoldiers proved to be particularly ineffective in the Japanese' war with the Emishi, an ethnic minority in the north that relied on mounted warriors and were thus highly mobile. The deciding factor in most battles had been professional mounted archers who came from the wealthy families. The government didn't train conscripts to be mounted archers because that took years and conscripts were short-term warriors. So it instead recruited men who already had these skills, acquired through private training funded by their families' wealth. Similarly, soldiers in the imperial army were expected to provide most of their own equipment. Wealthy men who could afford horses and archery training were promoted to elite units, whereas the poor were consigned to being footsoldiers. The poor disliked military service for this reason, and because their farms often fell into decay with their absence, so there was popular support for ending conscription.

Taxation during the 8th century was high but temples, monasteries, shrines, and certain aristocrats obtained tax exemptions through their connections to the imperial court. To evade taxes, many landowners in the countryside donated their lands to these tax-exempt entities. The land would be registered in the name of said noble or temple and would become part of their tax-exempt estate (shōen) but would still be used by the same person who originally owned it. The former owner, now a steward on his lord's estate, had to pay his lord an annual tribute that was less than what he would have had to pay the emperor in tax had he been the landowner. There was usually an agreement that when the steward died, his children would inherit his position. If the temple or lord cheated the steward somehow, the farmer could retaliate by exposing the scheme, which might have cost the temple or noble its tax-exempt privilege. The growth of the shōen led to a loss of tax revenue for the imperial court, and a heavier tax burden on those farmers who worked the remaining taxable land. These farmers often could not cope and abandoned their lands, which were bought up by the landowning magnates.

In the middle of the 8th century, the imperial government instituted a major reform which allowed individuals to claim private ownership of new farmland that they had reclaimed from the wilderness. This spurred wealthy people to start reclaiming farmland, which was necessary to feed Japan's growing population. During the 11th and 12th centuries, bushi became conspicuously involved in land reclamation, thereby becoming a landowning class. And like many landowners, the bushi often donated their lands to a shōen to avoid taxes. This had the effect of enriching the bushi while simultaneously depriving the imperial treasury.

In the Heian period it was the habit of emperors to keep harems, and consequently the imperial family got so large, it burdened the treasury. In the early 9th century AD, Emperor Saga expelled several dozen members from the imperial family, who formed two new clans: the Minamoto clan (814 AD) and the Taira clan (825 AD). Many wealthy provincial families married into the Minamotos and Tairas in order to acquire aristocratic status, gaining prestige and often tax exemptions. And so the Tairas and Minamotos became big and wealthy clans with lots of warrior retainers.

Thus with the downsizing of the national army and the decline in tax revenue, the emperors delegated the matter of security in the countryside to the burgeoning class of landed warriors. They had a personal incentive to suppress lawlessness in their own lands as it directly impacted their revenue.

=== The Genpei War (1180–1185) ===
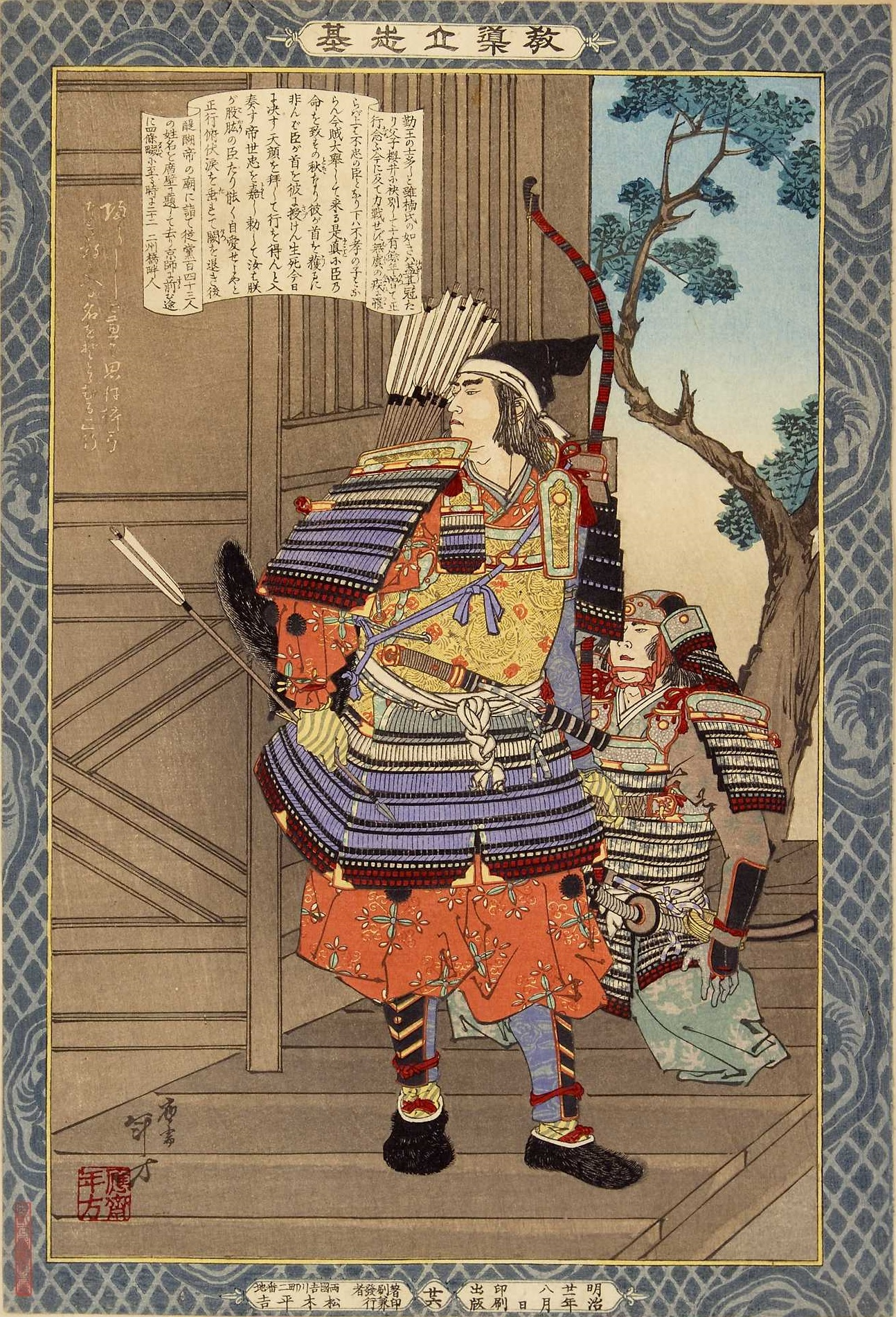
A warrior in ō-yoroi armor typical of the Gempei War (1180–1185).

Two leading warrior clans, the Minamoto clan and the Taira clan, had both gained court positions and became rivals.

In 1156, the former emperor Sutoku attempted to take back the throne from his brother, Emperor Go-Shirakawa, in what is remembered as the Hōgen rebellion. It failed and Sutoku was exiled. Members of the Minamoto and Taira clans had fought on both sides of the rebellion, but the Minamoto loyalists received smaller rewards than the Taira loyalists, and the Minamoto rebels received worse punishments than the Taira rebels. All this angered the Minamotos, and consequently political factions in the imperial court began to reform around clan affiliations rather than personal allegiances. The next rebellion would be a direct Taira/Minamoto clash.

The Minamotos took part in the Heiji Rebellion of 1160 in the hopes that they could have the Taira leader Taira no Kiyomori banished. This rebellion also failed, and in the aftermath the Tairas ended up with even more influence in the imperial court. Their leader, Taira no Kiyomori, became the first bushi ever to be given a senior rank in the imperial court (chief minister in 1167).

In 1180, Taira no Kiyomori installed his two-year-old grandson (Emperor Antoku) on the throne, pushing aside older male heirs whose mothers were from the Minamoto family. This sparked a rebellion by the Minamotos, leading to the Gempei War (1180–1185). Minamoto no Yoritomo promised lands and administrative rights to warriors who swore allegiance to him. The Minamotos won the war and the Taira clan was effectively destroyed. In April 1185, the controversial child emperor was drowned by his own grandmother, who then committed suicide.

=== Kamakura shogunate ===
The new emperor, Emperor Go-Toba, was of Fujiwara lineage, which did not fully satisfy Minamoto no Yoritomo, so he decided to rule Japan through a parallel military government headquartered in Kamakura. It would be staffed by warriors who served the Minamotos during the Gempei War: they had to be rewarded. Yoritomo was appointed sei-i taishōgun by the imperial regent (who didn't really have a choice in the matter). The emperor was reduced to a figurehead.

In 1192, the shogun created the gokenin class, who were his warrior vassals. They owed the shogun military service in exchange for various privileges. The service in question often included "guard duty" or apprehending criminals.

This is how the gokenin were defined in the Sata mirensho, a 14th-century guide to shogunate laws and legal procedures:

Gokenin are original reclaimers and proprietors of land (kaihotsu ryōshu) who are in possession of a warrant from the shogun (onkudashibumi) recognizing their authority over the reclaimed land. Kaihotsu ryōshu are the holders of private estates of which they are the developer of record (konpon shiryō or honryō). Higokenin are people of samurai status who do not serve the shogun and do not manage (chigyō) land bearing gokenin duties. Honchitsu means the surname by which the ancestor of a land steward (jitō) or a gokenin was commonly known.

The samurai class, as the word was used during the Kamakura period, was the warrior subclass below the gokenin. Some samurai were sub-vassals to a gokenin and therefore served the shogun indirectly. Like the gokenin, the samurai were mounted warriors and had surnames. Below the samurai class was the chūgen, footsoldiers who had no surname.

The shogun created the offices of jitō and shugo. The shugo and jitō were typically members of the gokenin class. A shugo was a military governor and among his responsibilities was registering and managing the shogun's gokenin. The jitō were military stewards of the estates.

During the Kamakura shogunate (1185 AD – 1333 AD), it was expected for a member of the bushi class to own land where he had his ancestral home and from which he made a living, although this was not required by law.

=== Nanboku-chō and Muromachi period ===
The Hōjō clan controlled the Kamakura shogunate as regents (shikken) during the Mongol invasions of Japan (1274–1281). Many samurai who fought the Mongols felt that they had not been properly rewarded by the regent, who favored his own clan too much. Emperor Godaigo saw an opportunity to restore imperial power. In 1333, the emperor incited the disgruntled samurai to rebel against the shogunate and return power to the imperial court, leading to the Kenmu Restoration. But Godaigo's policies proved unpopular, and in 1336 his top general Ashikaga Takauji betrayed him and established a new shogunate, this time headquartered in Kyoto. This shogunate is known as the Ashikaga shogunate.

The southern court, descended from Emperor Godaigo, and the northern court, descended from Emperor Kōgōn, were established side by side. This period of coexistence of the two dynasties is called the Nanboku-chō period, which corresponds to the beginning of the Muromachi period. The Northern Court, supported by the Ashikaga shogunate, had six emperors, and in 1392 the Imperial Court was reunited by absorbing the Southern Court, although the modern Imperial Household Agency considers the Southern Court to be the legitimate emperor. The de facto rule of Japan by the Ashikaga shogunate lasted until the Onin War, which broke out in 1467.

From 1346 to 1358 during the Nanboku-cho period, the Ashikaga shogunate gradually expanded the authority of the Shugo (守護), the local military and police officials established by the Kamakura shogunate, giving the Shugo jurisdiction over land disputes between gokenin (御家人) and allowing the Shugo to receive half of all taxes from the areas they controlled. The Shugo shared their newfound wealth with the local samurai, creating a hierarchical relationship between the Shugo and the samurai, and the first early daimyo (大名, feudal lords), called shugo daimyo (守護大名), appeared.

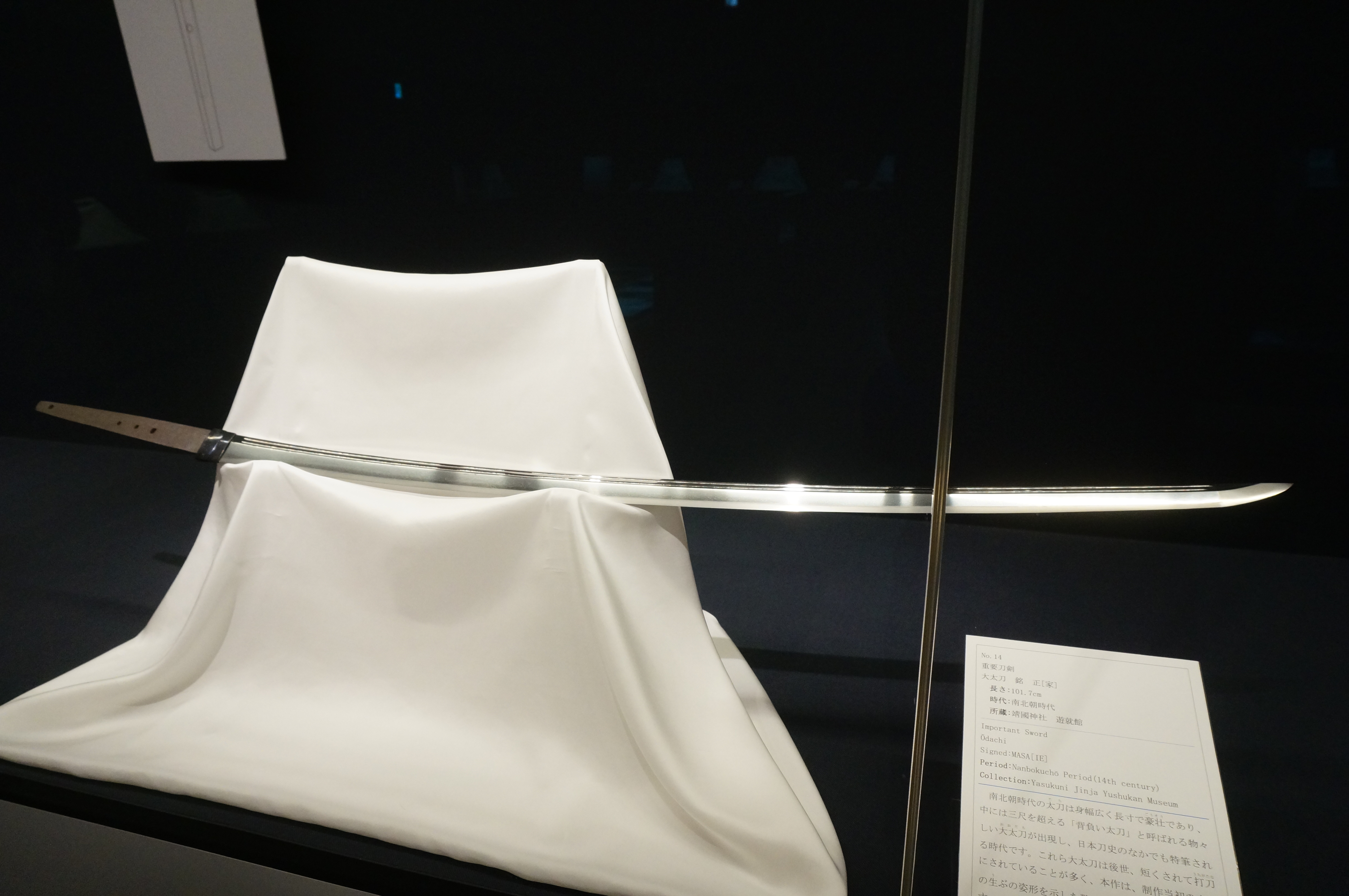
Ōdachi forged by Sadaie, 14th century, Nanboku-chō period, Important Sword

During the Nanboku-chō period, many lower-class foot soldiers called ashigaru began to participate in battles, and the popularity of haramaki increased. During the Nanboku-chō and Muromachi periods, dō-maru and haramaki became the norm, and senior samurai also began to wear haramaki by adding kabuto (helmet), men-yoroi (face armor), and gauntlet.

Issues of inheritance caused family strife as primogeniture became common, in contrast to the division of succession designated by law before the 14th century. Invasions of neighboring samurai territories became common to avoid infighting, and bickering among samurai was a constant problem for the Kamakura and Ashikaga shogunates.

=== Sengoku period ===
The outbreak of the Onin War, which began in 1467 and lasted about 10 years, devastated Kyoto and brought down the power of the Ashikaga shogunate. This plunged the country into the warring states period, in which daimyo (feudal lords) from different regions fought each other. This period corresponds to the late Muromachi period. There are about nine theories about the end of the Sengoku Period, the earliest being the year 1568, when Oda Nobunaga marched on Kyoto, and the latest being the suppression of the Shimabara Rebellion in 1638. Thus, the Sengoku Period overlaps with the Muromachi, Azuchi–Momoyama, and Edo periods, depending on the theory. In any case, the Sengoku period was a time of large-scale civil wars throughout Japan.

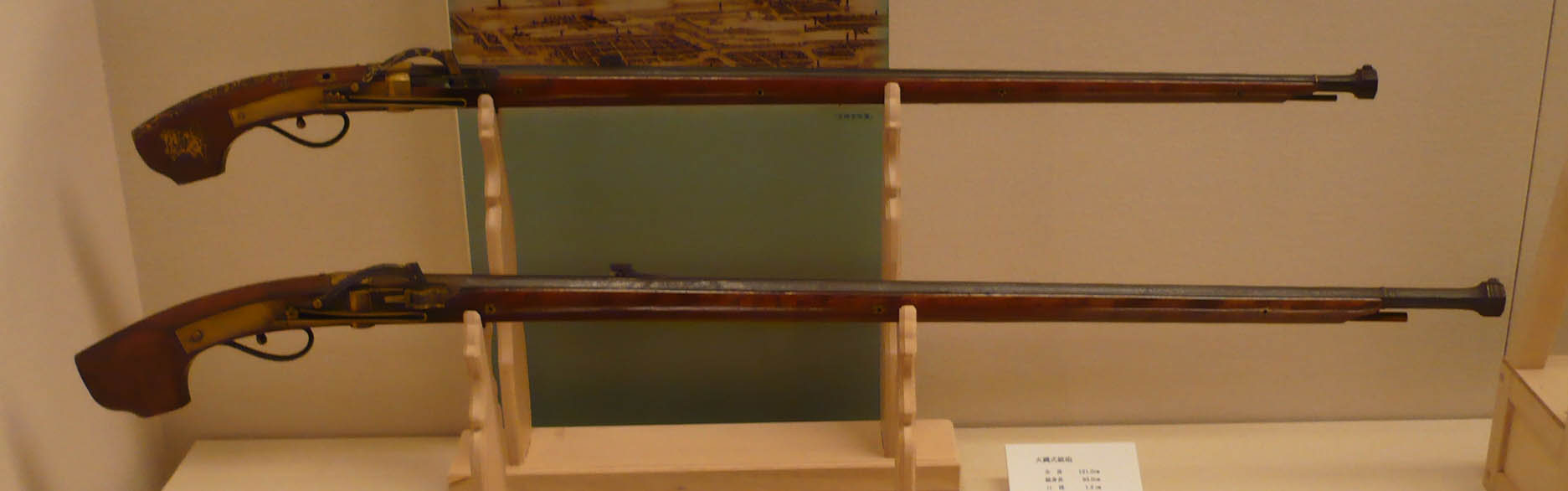
Tanegashima (arquebus)

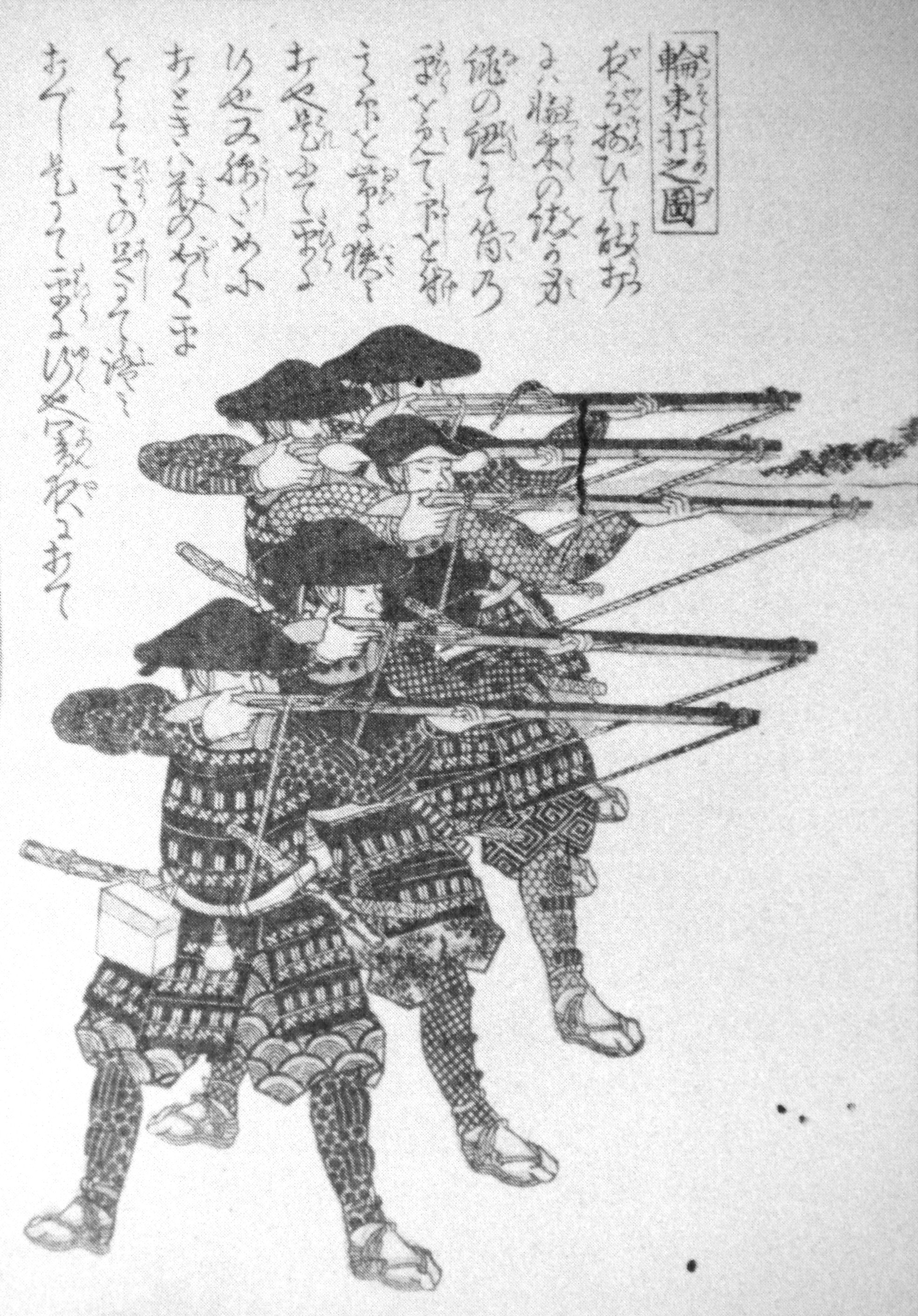
Large numbers of ashigaru (foot soldiers) in close formation began to use yari (spears) and tanegashima (gun), changing battlefield tactics and the equipment of the samurai class.

Daimyo who became more powerful as the shogunate's control weakened were called sengoku daimyo (戦国大名), and they often came from shugo daimyo, Shugodai (守護代, deputy Shugo), and kokujin or kunibito (国人, local masters). In other words, sengoku daimyo differed from shugo daimyo in that a sengoku daimyo was able to rule the region on his own, without being appointed by the shogun.

During this period, the traditional master-servant relationship between the lord and his vassals broke down, with the vassals eliminating the lord, internal clan and vassal conflicts over leadership of the lord's family, and frequent rebellion and puppetry by branch families against the lord's family. These events sometimes led to the rise of samurai to the rank of sengoku daimyo. For example, Hōjō Sōun was the first samurai to rise to the rank of sengoku daimyo during this period. Uesugi Kenshin was an example of a Shugodai who became sengoku daimyo by weakening and eliminating the power of the lord.

This period was marked by the loosening of samurai culture, with people born into other social strata sometimes making a name for themselves as warriors and thus becoming de facto samurai. One such example is Toyotomi Hideyoshi, a well-known figure who rose from a peasant background to become a samurai, sengoku daimyo, and kampaku (Imperial Regent).

In 1543, Portuguese explorers taught the Japanese how to make matchlock muskets. The Japanese took a quick liking to this new weapon. Initially, they were items of prestige wielded only by samurai, but certain daimyo noticed that muskets took only a week or two of training to master and therefore should be used in large numbers by peasant infantry.

From this time on, infantrymen called ashigaru, who were mobilized from the peasantry, were mobilized in even greater numbers than before, and the importance of the infantry, which had begun in the Nanboku-chō period, increased even more. When matchlocks were introduced from Portugal in 1543, Japanese swordsmiths immediately began to improve and mass-produce them. The Japanese matchlock was named tanegashima after the Tanegashima island, which is believed to be the place where it was first introduced to Japan. By the end of the Sengoku Period, there were hundreds of thousands of arquebuses in Japan and a large army of nearly 100,000 men clashing with each other.

On the battlefield, ashigaru began to fight in close formation, using yari (spear) and tanegashima. As a result, yari, yumi (bow), and tanegashima became the primary weapons on the battlefield. The naginata, which was difficult to maneuver in close formation, and the long, heavy tachi fell into disuse and were replaced by the nagamaki, which could be held short, and the short, light katana, which appeared in the Nanboku-cho period and gradually became more common. The tachi was often cut off from the hilt and shortened to make a katana. The tachi, which had become inconvenient for use on the battlefield, was transformed into a symbol of authority carried by high-ranking samurai. Although the ōdachi had become even more obsolete, some sengoku daimyo dared to organize assault and kinsmen units composed entirely of large men equipped with ōdachi to demonstrate the bravery of their armies.

These changes in the aspect of the battlefield during the Sengoku period led to the emergence of the tosei-gusoku style of armor, which improved the productivity and durability of armor. In the history of Japanese armor, this was the most significant change since the introduction of the ō-yoroi and dō-mal in the Heian period. In this style, the number of parts was reduced, and instead armor with eccentric designs became popular.

By the end of the Sengoku period, allegiances between warrior vassals, also known as military retainers, and lords were solidified. Vassals would serve lords in exchange for material and intangible advantages, in keeping with Confucian ideas imported from China between the seventh and ninth centuries. These independent vassals who held land were subordinate to their superiors, who may be local lords or, in the Edo period, the shogun. A vassal or samurai could expect monetary benefits, including land or money, from lords in exchange for their military services.

=== Azuchi–Momoyama period ===
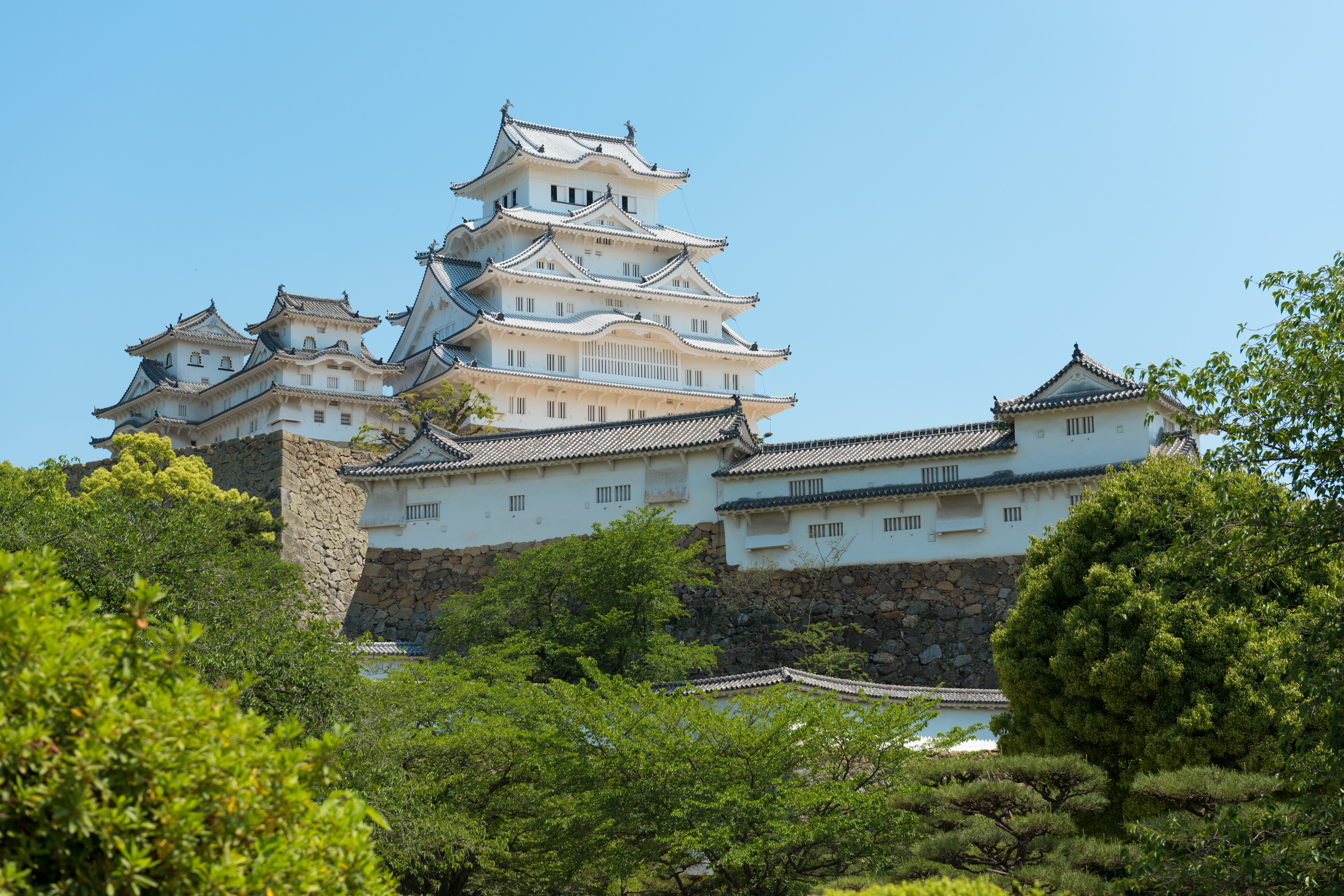
Between 1601 and 1609, Ikeda Terumasa extensively renovated Himeji Castle to give it its present appearance.

The Azuchi-Momoyama period refers to the period when Oda Nobunaga and Toyotomi Hideyoshi were in power. The name "Azuchi-Momoyama" comes from the fact that Nobunaga's castle, Azuchi Castle, was located in Azuchi, Shiga, and Fushimi Castle, where Hideyoshi lived after his retirement, was located in Momoyama. There are several theories as to when the Azuchi–Momoyama period began: 1568, when Oda Nobunaga entered Kyoto in support of Ashikaga Yoshiaki; 1573, when Oda Nobunaga expelled Ashikaga Yoshiaki from Kyoto; and 1576, when the construction of Azuchi Castle began. In any case, the beginning of the Azuchii–Momoyama period marked the complete end of the rule of the Ashikaga shogunate, which had been disrupted by the Onin War; in other words, it marked the end of the Muromachi period.

==== Oda, Toyotomi, and Tokugawa ====
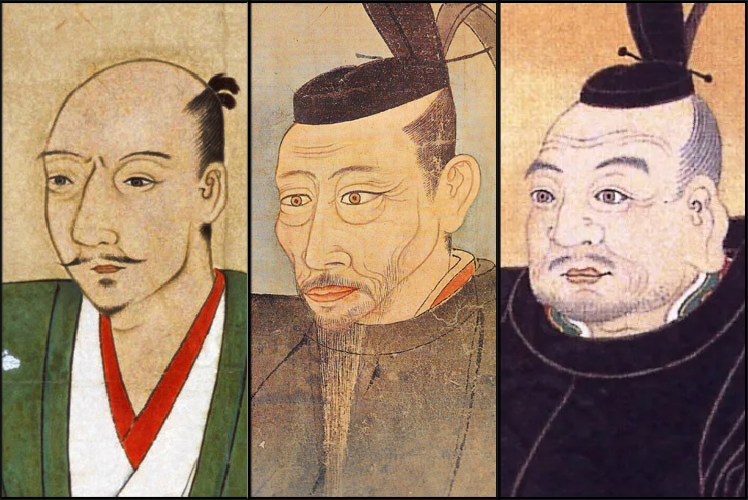
The three unifiers of Japan: from left to right: Oda Nobunaga, Toyotomi Hideyoshi and Tokugawa Ieyasu

Oda Nobunaga was the well-known lord of the Nagoya area (once called Owari Province) and an exceptional example of a samurai of the Sengoku period. He came within a few years of, and laid down the path for his successors to follow, the reunification of Japan under a new bakufu (shogunate).

Oda Nobunaga made innovations in the fields of organization and war tactics, made heavy use of arquebuses, developed commerce and industry, and treasured innovation. Consecutive victories enabled him to end the Ashikaga Bakufu and disarm of the military powers of the Buddhist monks, which had inflamed futile struggles among the populace for centuries. Attacking from the "sanctuary" of Buddhist temples, they were constant headaches to any warlord and even the emperor, who tried to control their actions. He died in 1582 when one of his generals, Akechi Mitsuhide, turned upon him with his army.

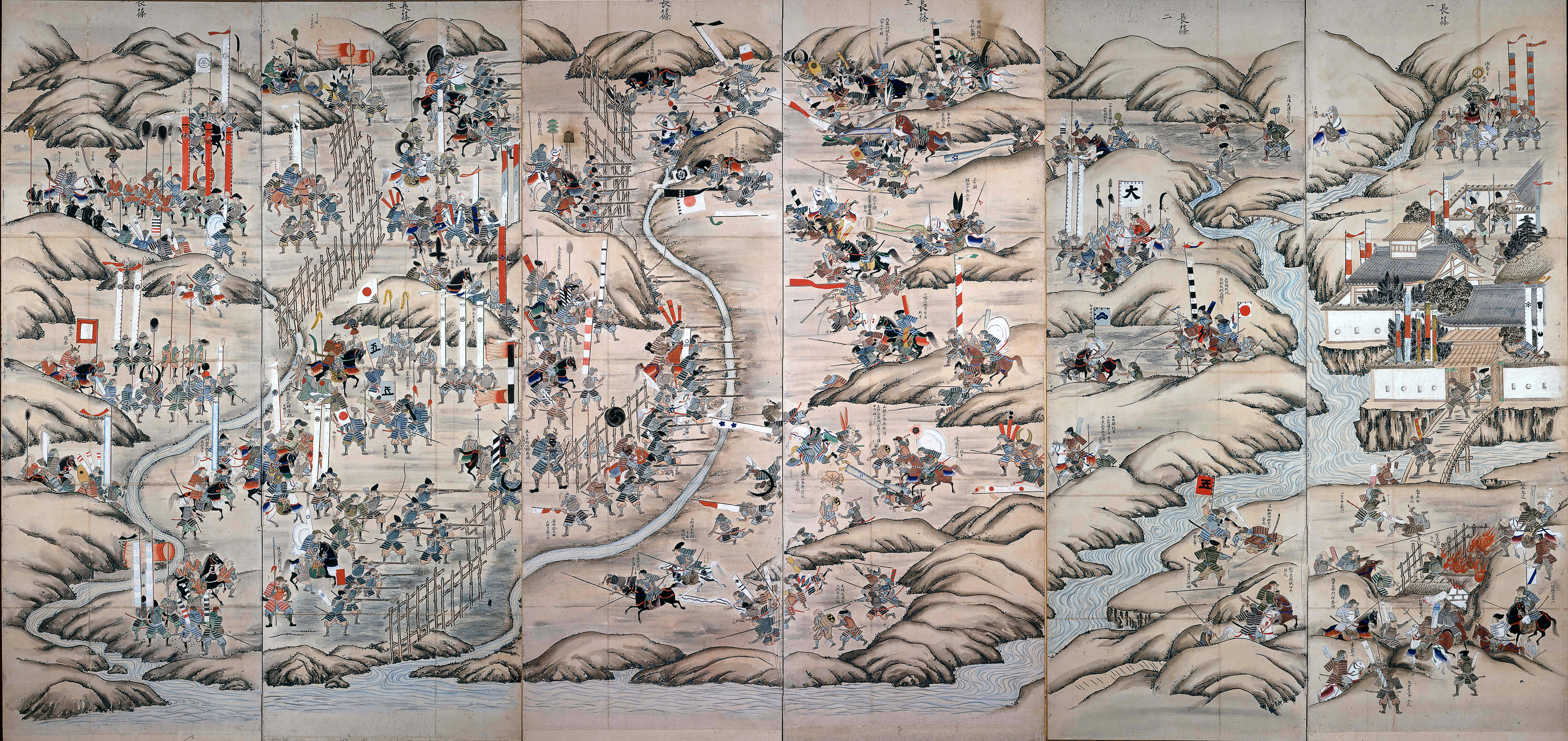
The Battle of Nagashino (1575)

Toyotomi Hideyoshi and Tokugawa Ieyasu, who founded the Tokugawa shogunate, were loyal followers of Nobunaga. Hideyoshi began as a peasant and became one of Nobunaga's top generals, and Ieyasu had shared his childhood with Nobunaga. Hideyoshi defeated Mitsuhide within a month and was regarded as the rightful successor of Nobunaga by avenging the treachery of Mitsuhide. These two were able to use Nobunaga's previous achievements on which build a unified Japan and there was a saying: "The reunification is a rice cake; Oda made it. Hashiba shaped it. In the end, only Ieyasu tastes it." (Hashiba is the family name that Toyotomi Hideyoshi used while he was a follower of Nobunaga.)

Toyotomi Hideyoshi, who became a grand minister in 1586, created a law that non-samurai were not allowed to carry weapons, which the samurai caste codified as permanent and hereditary, thereby ending the social mobility of Japan, which lasted until the dissolution of the Edo shogunate by the Meiji revolutionaries.

The distinction between samurai and non-samurai was so obscure that during the 16th century, most male adults in any social class (even small farmers) belonged to at least one military organization of their own and served in wars before and during Hideyoshi's rule. It can be said that an "all against all" situation continued for a century. The authorized samurai families after the 17th century were those that chose to follow Nobunaga, Hideyoshi and Ieyasu. Large battles occurred during the change between regimes, and a number of defeated samurai were destroyed, went rōnin or were absorbed into the general populace.

During the Azuchi–Momoyama period (late Sengoku period), "samurai" often referred to wakatō (若党), the lowest-ranking bushi, as exemplified by the provisions of the temporary law Separation Edict enacted by Toyotomi Hideyoshi in 1591. This law regulated the transfer of status classes:samurai (wakatō), chūgen (中間), komono (小者), and arashiko (荒子). These four classes and the ashigaru were chōnin (町人, townspeople) and peasants employed by the bushi and fell under the category of buke hōkōnin (武家奉公人, servants of the buke). In times of war, samurai (wakatō) and ashigaru were fighters, while the rest were porters. Generally, samurai (wakatō) could take family names, while some ashigaru could, and only samurai (wakatō) were considered samurai class. Wakatō, like samurai, had different definitions in different periods, meaning a young bushi in the Muromachi period and a rank below kachi (徒士) and above ashigaru in the Edo period.

==== Battle of Sekigahara ====
The Battle of Sekigahara, known as "Japan's decisive battle" (天下分け目の戦い, Tenka wakeme no tatakai)

Before his death, Hideyoshi ordered that Japan be ruled by a council of the five most powerful sengoku daimyo, Go-Tairō (五大老, Council of Five Elders), and Hideyoshi's five retainers, Go-Bugyō (五奉行, Five Commissioners), until his only heir, the five-year-old Toyotomi Hideyori, reached the age of 16. However, having only the young Hideyori as Hideyoshi's successor weakened the Toyotomi regime. Today, the loss of all of Hideyoshi's adult heirs is considered the main reason for the downfall of the Toyotomi clan. Hideyoshi's younger brother, Toyotomi Hidenaga, who had supported Hideyoshi's rise to power as a leader and strategist, had already died of illness in 1591, and his nephew, Toyotomi Hidetsugu, who was Hideyoshi's only adult successor, was forced to commit seppuku in 1595 along with many other vassals on Hideyoshi's orders for suspected rebellion.

In this politically unstable situation, Maeda Toshiie, one of the Gotairō, died of illness, and Tokugawa Ieyasu, one of the Gotairō who had been second in power to Hideyoshi but had not participated in the war, rose to power, and Ieyasu came into conflict with Ishida Mitsunari, one of the Go-Bukyō and others. This conflict eventually led to the Battle of Sekigahara, in which the Tō-gun (東軍, Eastern Army) led by Ieyasu defeated the Sei-gun (西軍, Western Army) led by Mitsunari, and Ieyasu nearly gained control of Japan.

Social mobility was high, as the ancient regime collapsed and emerging samurai needed to maintain a large military and administrative organizations in their areas of influence. Most of the samurai families that survived to the 19th century originated in this era, declaring themselves to be the blood of one of the four ancient noble clans: Minamoto, Taira, Fujiwara, and Tachibana. In most cases, however, it is difficult to prove these claims.

=== Tokugawa shogunate ===
After the Battle of Sekigahara, Tokugawa Ieyasu consolidated power and was declared shogun in 1603. After the siege of Osaka in 1615, there was a period of peace for 250 years. During the Tokugawa shogunate, samurai underwent many changes, and first became a truly hereditary class. Although this process was begun by Hideyoshi with the combination of the Sword Hunt of 1588 and the Separation Edict of 1591. Most samurai moved from the land to the castle towns, with one town in each domain. With no warfare since the early 17th century, samurai gradually lost their military function during the Tokugawa era. Neo-Confucianism became very influential and the division of society into four classes was officially adopted by the shogunate. Landed samurai had to choose to either give up their lands to become stipend samurai, or to keep their lands and become peasants.

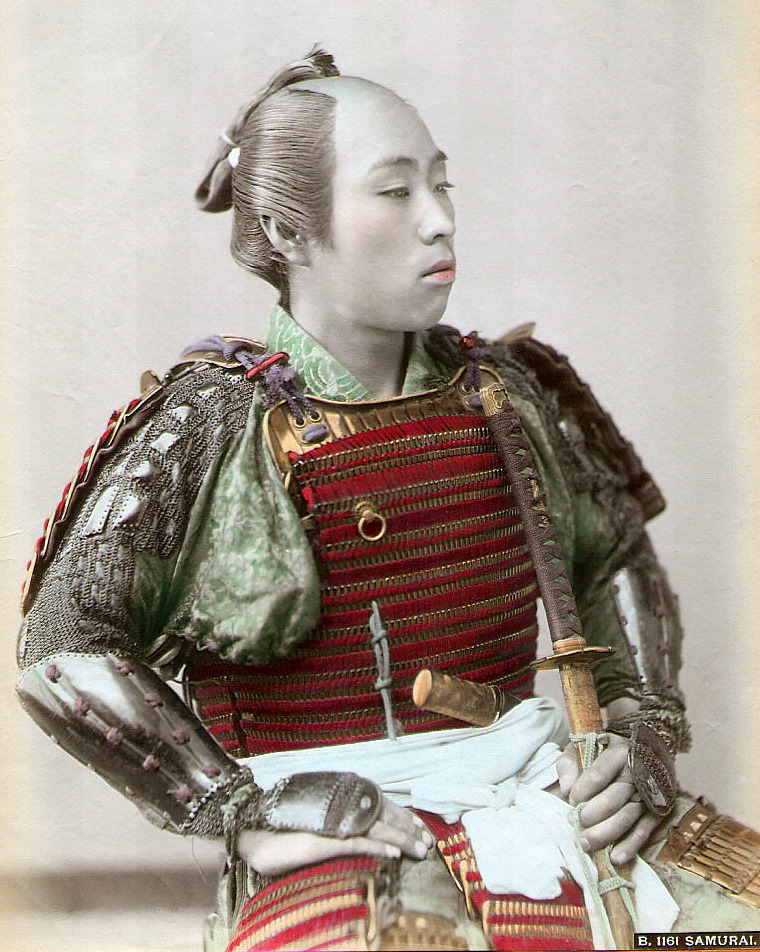
The chonmage became the customary hairstyle for samurai during the Edo period.

Following the passing of a law in 1629, samurai on official duty were required to wear two swords. However, by the end of the Tokugawa era, samurai were aristocratic bureaucrats for their daishō, becoming more of a symbolic emblem of power than a weapon used in daily life. They still had the legal right to cut down any commoner who did not show proper respect (kiri-sute gomen), but to what extent this right was used is unknown. When the central government forced daimyōs to cut the size of their armies, unemployed rōnin became a social problem.

Theoretical obligations between a samurai and his lord (usually a daimyō) increased from the Genpei era to the Edo era, strongly emphasized by the teachings of Confucius and Mencius, required reading for the educated samurai class. The leading figures who introduced Confucianism in Japan in the early Tokugawa period were Fujiwara Seika (1561–1619), Hayashi Razan (1583–1657), and Matsunaga Sekigo (1592–1657).

Pederasty permeated the culture of samurai in the early seventeenth century. The relentless condemnation of pederasty by Jesuit missionaries also hindered attempts to convert Japan's governing elite to Christianity. Pederasty had become deeply institutionalized among the daimyo and samurai, prompting comparisons to ancient Athens and Sparta. The Jesuits' strong condemnation of the practice alienated many of Japan's ruling class, creating further barriers to their acceptance of Christianity. Tokugawa Iemitsu, the third shogun, was known for his interest in pederasty.

From the mid-Edo period, wealthy chōnin (townsman) and farmers could join the samurai class by giving a large sum of money to an impoverished gokenin to be adopted into a samurai family and inherit the samurai's position and stipend. The amount of money given to a gokenin varied according to his position: 1,000 ryo for a yoriki and 500 ryo for an kachi (徒士) Some of their descendants were promoted to hatamoto (旗本) and held important positions in the shogunate. Some of the peasants' children were promoted to the samurai class by serving in the daikan (代官) office. Kachi could change jobs and move into the lower classes, such as chōnin. For example, Takizawa Bakin became a chōnin by working for Tsutaya Jūzaburō.

==== Samurai in Southeast Asia ====
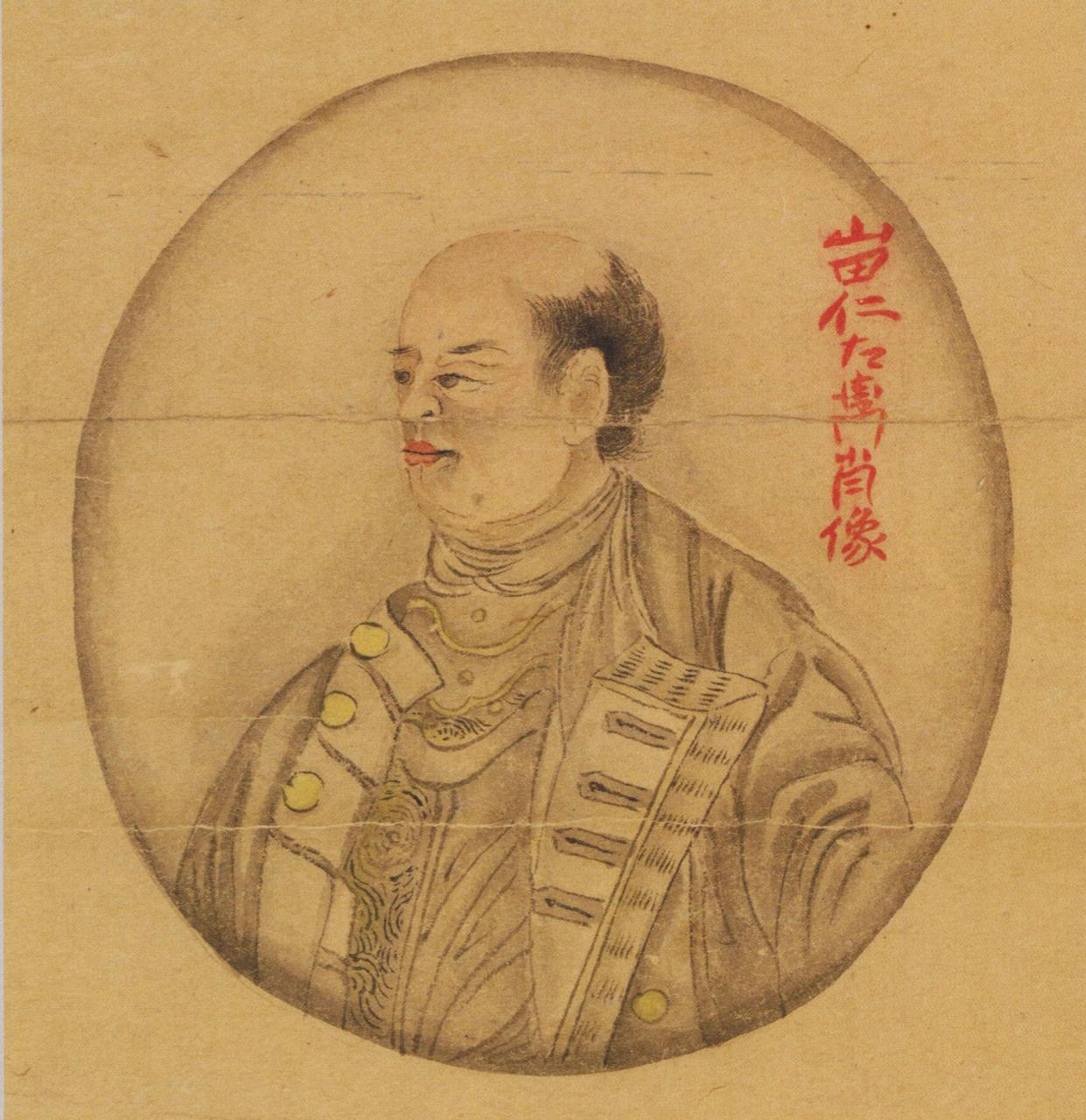
Portrait of Yamada Nagamasa, circa 1630

In the late 1500s, trade between Japan and Southeast Asia accelerated and increased exponentially when the Tokugawa shogunate was established in the early 1600s. The destinations of the trading ships, the red seal ships, were Thailand, the Philippines, Vietnam, Cambodia, etc. Many Japanese moved to Southeast Asia and established Japanese towns there. Many samurai, or rōnin, who had lost their masters after the Battle of Sekigahara, lived in the Japanese towns. The Spaniards in the Philippines, the Dutch of the Dutch East India Company, and the Thais of the Ayutthaya Kingdom saw the value of these samurai as mercenaries and recruited them. The most famous of these mercenaries was Yamada Nagamasa. He was originally a palanquin bearer who belonged to the lowest end of the samurai class, but he rose to prominence in the Ayutthaya Kingdom, now in southern Thailand, and became governor of the Nakhon Si Thammarat Kingdom. When the policy of national isolation (sakoku) was established in 1639, trade between Japan and Southeast Asia ceased, and records of Japanese activities in Southeast Asia were lost for many years after 1688.

==== Samurai as diplomatic ambassadors ====
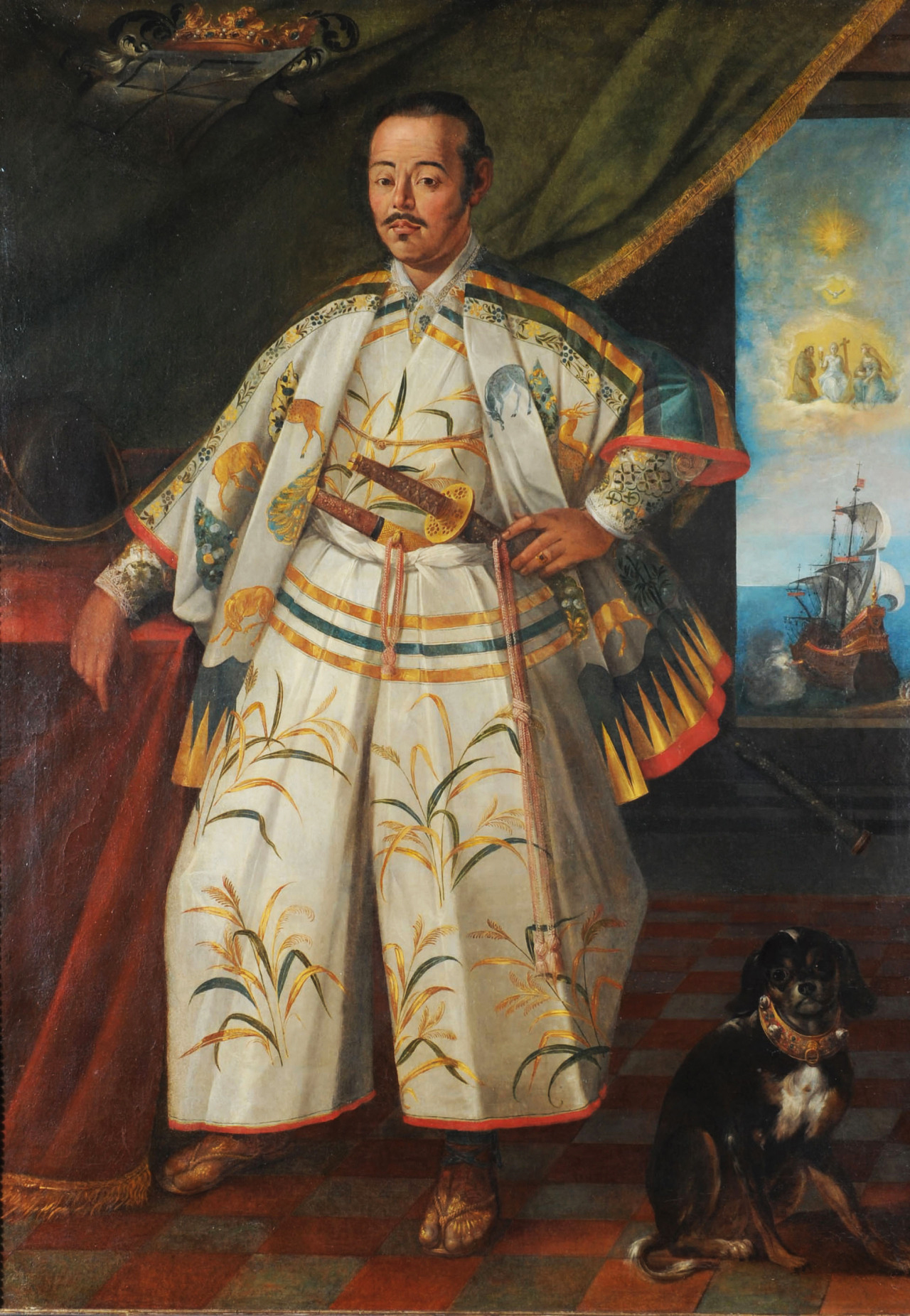
Hasekura Tsunenaga portrayed during his mission in Rome by Archita Ricci, 1615

In 1582, three Kirishitan daimyō, Ōtomo Sōrin, Ōmura Sumitada, and Arima Harunobu, sent a group of boys, their own blood relatives and retainers, to Europe as Japan's first diplomatic mission to Europe. They had audiences with King Philip II of Spain, Pope Gregory XIII, and Pope Sixtus V. The mission returned to Japan in 1590, but its members were forced to renounce, be exiled, or be executed, due to the Tokugawa shogunate's suppression of Christianity.

In 1612, Hasekura Tsunenaga, a vassal of the daimyo Date Masamune, led a diplomatic mission and had an audience with King Philip III of Spain, presenting him with a letter requesting trade, and he also had an audience with Pope Paul V in Rome. He returned to Japan in 1620, but news of the Tokugawa shogunate's suppression of Christianity had already reached Europe, and trade did not take place due to the Tokugawa shogunate's policy of sakoku. In the town of Coria del Rio in Spain, where the diplomatic mission stopped, there were 600 people with the surnames Japon or Xapon as of 2021, and they have passed on the folk tale that they are the descendants of the samurai who remained in the town.

At the end of the Edo period (Bakumatsu era), when Matthew C. Perry came to Japan in 1853 and the sakoku policy was abolished, six diplomatic missions were sent to the United States and European countries for diplomatic negotiations. The most famous were the US mission in 1860 and the European missions in 1862 and 1864.

=== Dissolution ===
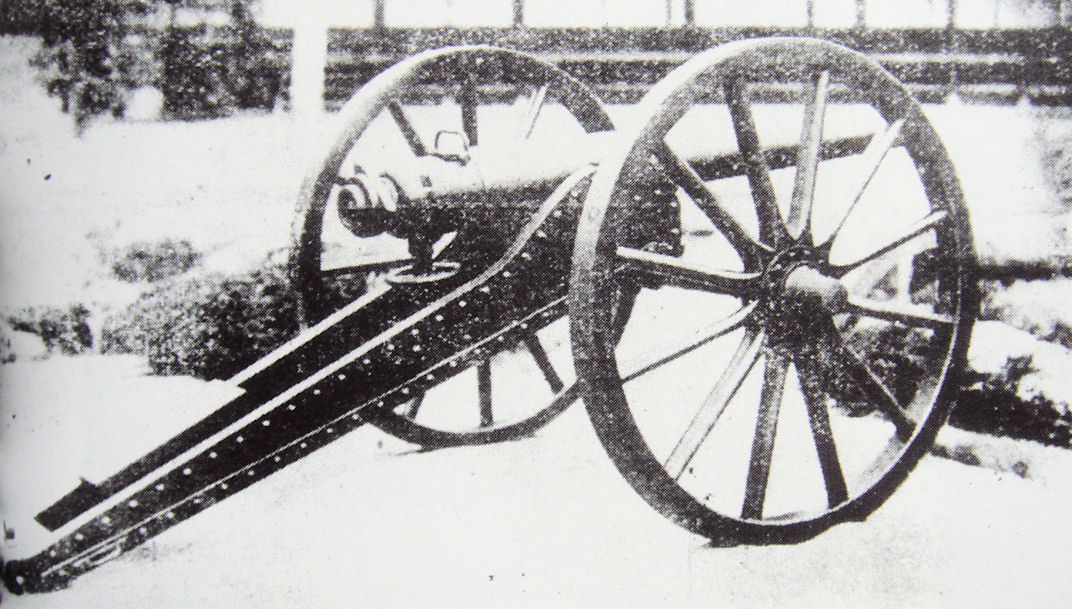
Saga-Domain-built Armstrong gun used at the Battle of Ueno in 1868

By the mid-nineteenth century, the Tokugawa shogunate faced increasing pressure from Western powers in East Asia. The defeat of Qing China in the Opium Wars, repeated foreign naval visits, and American Commodore Matthew C. Perry's expedition of 1853–54 exposed weaknesses in Japan's coastal defence and diplomatic position. These pressures intensified domestic debates over foreign policy and encouraged military and institutional reform.

Military reform had already begun before the Meiji Restoration. From the 1840s, the shogunate and several domains, such as Saga, Choshu, and Satsuma, experimented with Western-style gunnery, drill, coastal defence, and firearms. Imported weapons and foreign military knowledge became increasingly important in the 1860s.

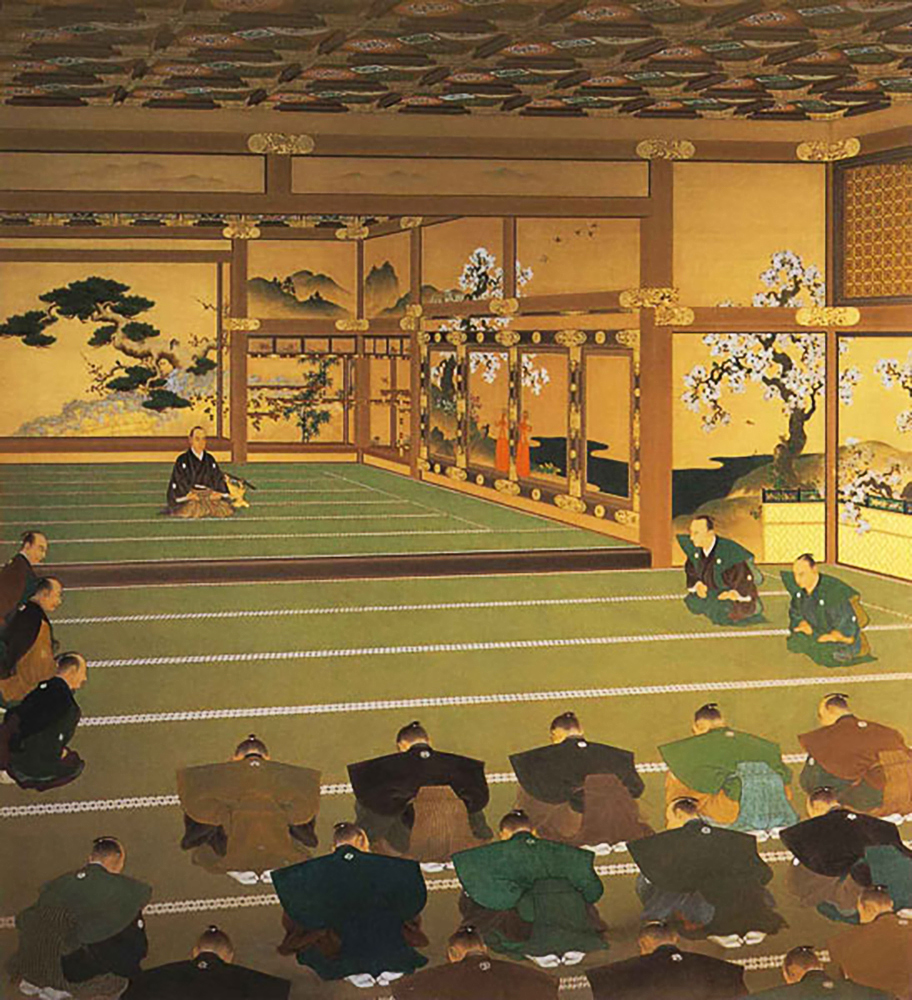
Tokugawa Yoshinobu announcing the return of governing authority to the emperor at Nijō Castle in 1867.

In 1867, Tokugawa Yoshinobu, the 15th Tokugawa shogun, returned governing authority to the emperor, and the following year the new Meiji government was established after the outbreak of the Boshin War. The Restoration did not immediately abolish the samurai. Many of the men who led the new government were themselves former samurai from domains such as Satsuma, Chōshū, Tosa, and Saga, and former members of the warrior status group played important roles in the new bureaucracy, military, police, education system, journalism, business, and politics.

The institutional basis of samurai status was nevertheless dismantled through a series of reforms after the Meiji Restoration. In 1869, samurai feudal lords (daimyo) and court nobles (kuge) were reorganized as kazoku (nobility), while most former warriors became shizoku. The return of lands and people to the emperor and the abolition of the domains in 1871 weakened the old lord-retainer order and transferred the payment of former samurai stipends to the central government. The introduction of conscription in 1873 further separated military service from hereditary warrior status.

The consequences of these reforms varied among former samurai. Some used their education, administrative experience, and connections to adapt to the new order, while others lost hereditary income and status, especially after the abolition of stipends. Economic hardship and alienation among some former samurai contributed to political opposition and local unrest in the 1870s. Discontent among former samurai contributed to several uprisings in the 1870s, including the Saga Rebellion of 1874, the Shinpūren, Akizuki, and Hagi rebellions of 1876, and the Satsuma Rebellion of 1877. The Satsuma Rebellion, led by Saigō Takamori, was the largest of these uprisings and the last major armed revolt by former samurai. Its defeat confirmed the military and political authority of the central government and marked the end of large-scale armed resistance by disaffected shizoku. In the 1918 census, kazoku and shizoku accounted for approximately 0.01% and 4.06% of the population, respectively. The status category of shizoku nevertheless remained in official use until 1947, long after the practical privileges of the samurai had disappeared.

== Martial traditions ==
During the Heian period (794 - 1185), distinctive weapons such as the tachi and naginata, commonly associated with the samurai, came into use. This era also saw the development of armor styles such as the ō-yoroi and dō-maru. High-ranking samurai, who fought primarily on horseback using archery (yumi), typically wore the heavy and expensive ō-yoroi, which was well-suited for mounted combat. In contrast, lower-ranking samurai fought on foot, wielding naginata and wearing the lighter and more affordable dō-maru. The warabite-tō swords used by the Emishi influenced the evolution of Japanese swordsmithing techniques, eventually leading to the development of the curved tachi. As a result, straight swords were gradually replaced by curved ones better suited for slashing in combat.

== Samurai ranks ==
The samurai class was highly stratified. Rank was determined by a variety of factors such as the rank of one's lord and the size of one's stipend. Individual domains also made their own distinctions. The domain of Choshu had forty strata for the military class. The highest ranking Tokugawa vassals were the daimyo, who had at least 10,000 koku. Next came the hatamoto, who were distinguished by the right of audience with the shogun, followed by the gokenin. Samurai with a large enough stipend had their own retainers who were also samurai, called baishin. Each daimyo had his own retainers that were divided into many ranks. They were roughly divided into shi and sotsu. The highest ranking shi could have a larger stipend than some daimyo. These were usually cadet branch of the domain's ruler or karō families. Most samurai were hizamurai (ordinary samurai) who had an average stipend of 100 koku, and typically were mounted. Under them were the kachi who were on foot and were sometimes not considered samurai. Ashigaru were the lowest ranking members of the military class. While they carried two swords they are often not considered samurai, although they are sometimes listed as lower samurai.

== Bushido ==
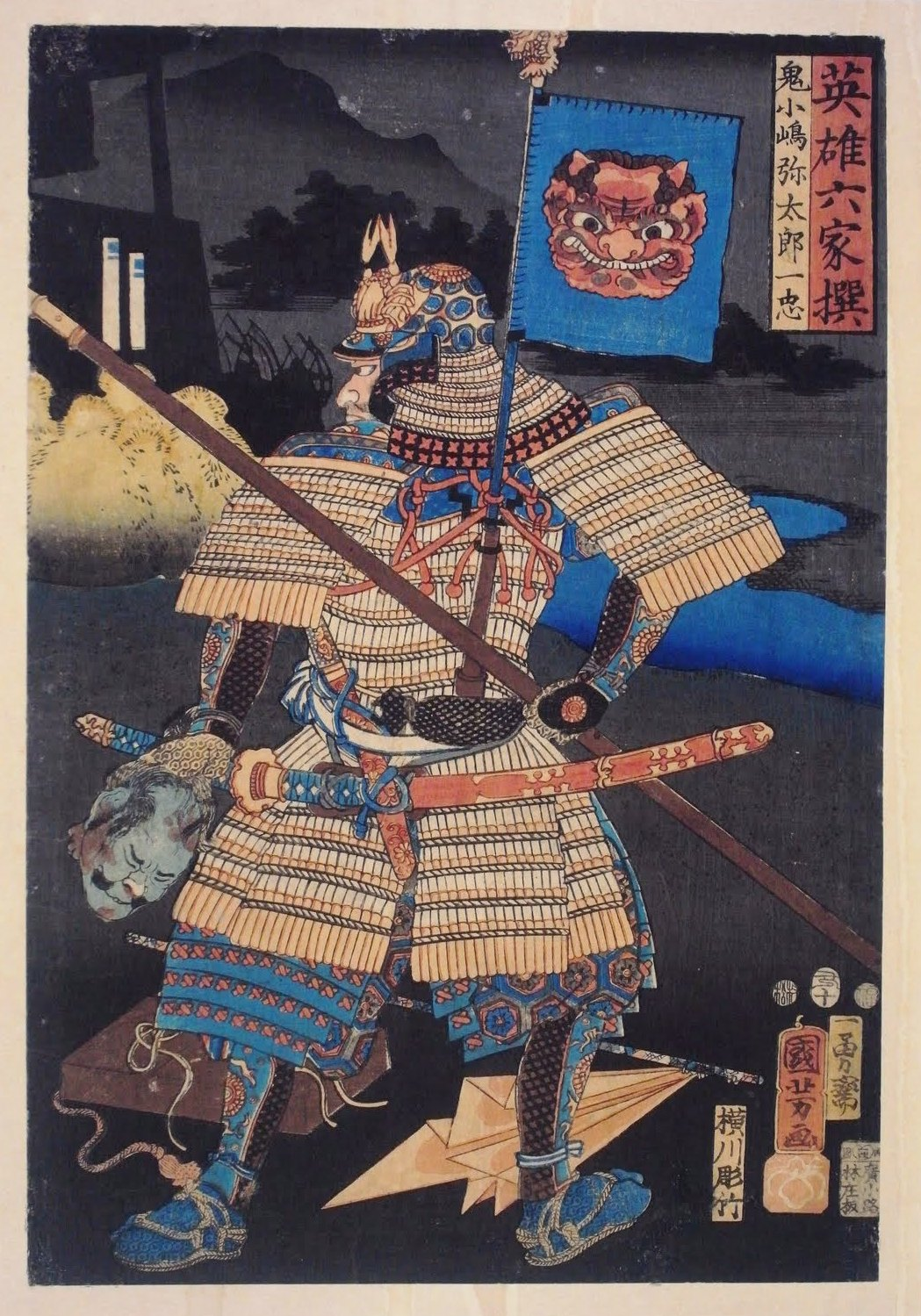
A samurai holding a severed head. After a battle, the heads of enemies were presented to the daimyo.

In the 13th century, Hōjō Shigetoki wrote: "When one is serving officially or in the master's court, he should not think of a hundred or a thousand people, but should consider only the importance of the master." Carl Steenstrup notes that 13th- and 14th-century warrior writings (gunki) "portrayed the bushi in their natural element, war, eulogizing such virtues as reckless bravery, fierce family pride, and selfless, at times senseless devotion of master and man".

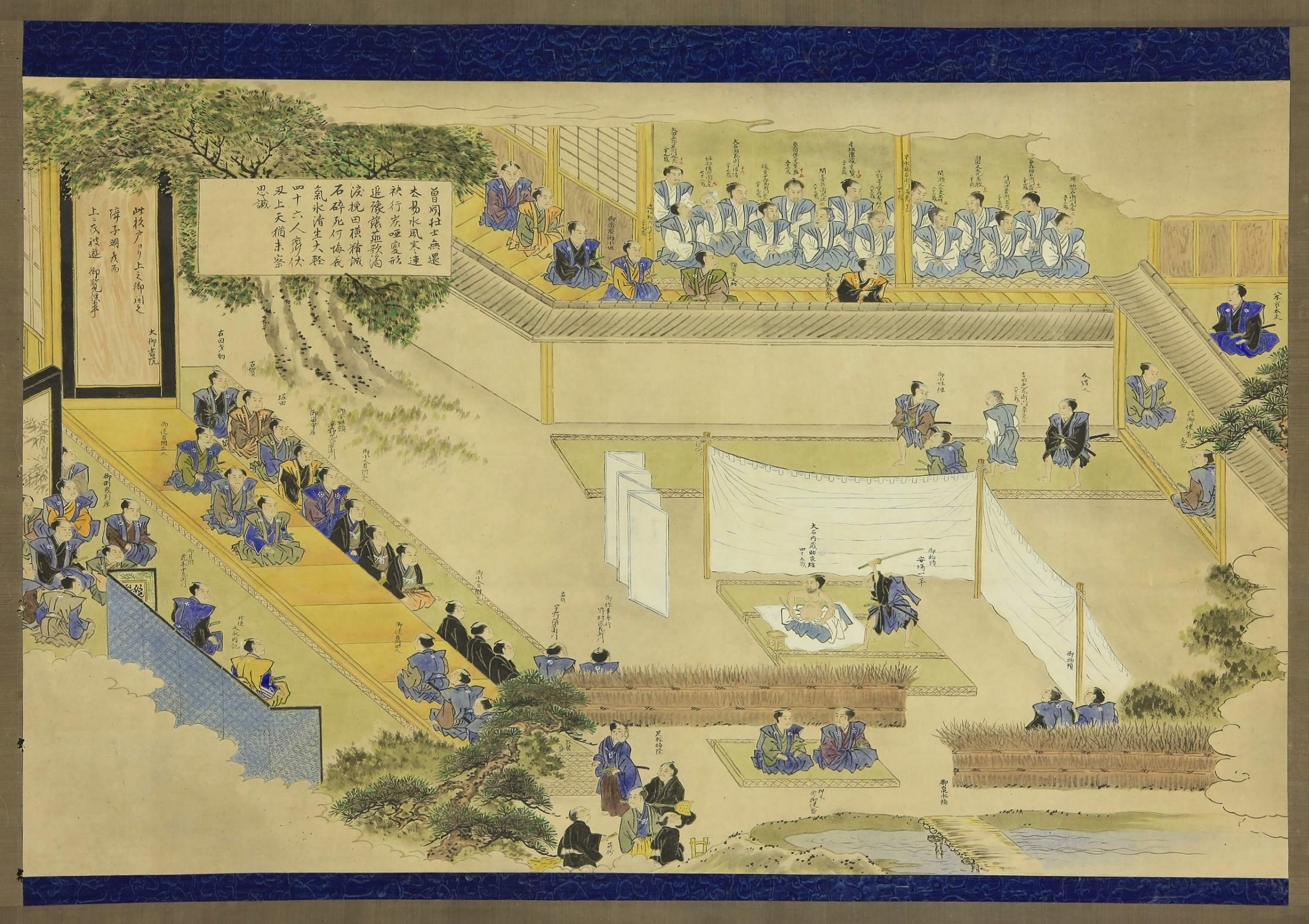
A painting of Ōishi Yoshio performing seppuku, 1703

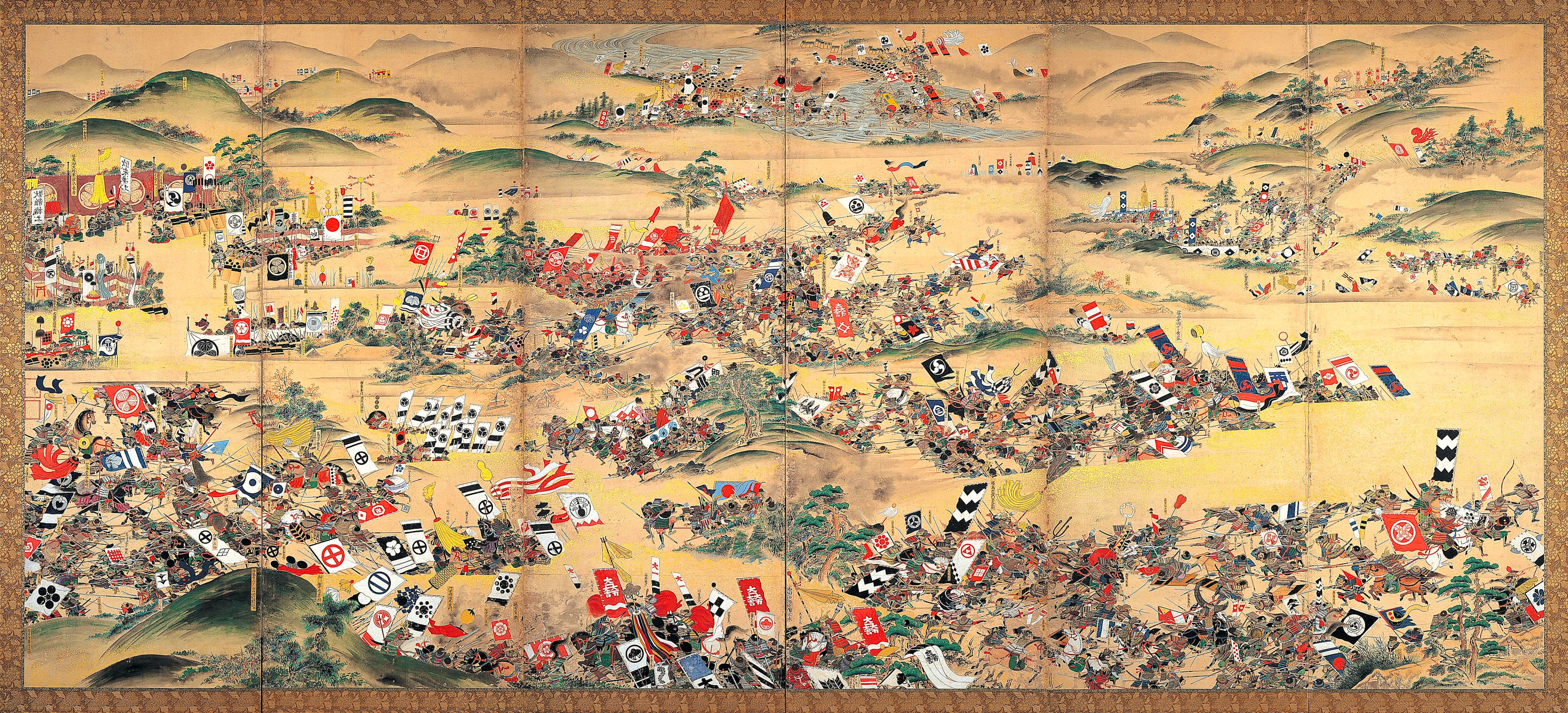
An Edo-period screen depicting the Battle of Sekigahara. It began on 21 October 1600 with a total of 160,000 men facing each other.

The translator of Hagakure, William Scott Wilson, observed examples of warrior emphasis on death in clans other than Yamamoto's: "he (Takeda Shingen) was a strict disciplinarian as a warrior, and there is an exemplary story in the Hagakure relating his execution of two brawlers, not because they had fought, but because they had not fought to the death".

=== Religion ===
The philosophies of Confucianism, Buddhism (popularly Zen Buddhism), and to a lesser extent Shinto, influenced samurai culture. Zen meditation became an important teaching to some samurai as it offered a process to calm one's mind. The Buddhist concept of reincarnation and rebirth often led samurai to abandon torture and needless killing, while some samurai even gave up violence altogether and became Buddhist monks after coming to believe that their killings were fruitless. Some were killed as they came to terms with these conclusions in the battlefield. The most defining role that Confucianism played in samurai philosophy was to stress the importance of the lord-retainer relationship—the loyalty that a samurai was required to show his lord.

Literature on the subject of bushido such as Hagakure ("Hidden in Leaves") by Yamamoto Tsunetomo and Gorin no Sho ("Book of the Five Rings") by Miyamoto Musashi, both written in the Edo period, contributed to the development of bushidō and Zen philosophy.

According to Robert Sharf, "The notion that Zen is somehow related to Japanese culture in general, and bushidō in particular, is familiar to Western students of Zen through the writings of D. T. Suzuki, no doubt the single most important figure in the spread of Zen in the West."

However, despite the popular Western conception that Zen was important to all samurai, even at the height of Zen's prominence it remained merely one of many various Buddhist schools followed by the warrior caste. As Japanologist Martin Collcutt writes in Five Mountains: The Rinzai Zen Monastic Institution in Medieval Japan,

Even at the height of its influence in the last fourteenth century, Zen–including the more widely diffused Sōtō Zen–probably had still not replaced devotion to Kannon, Jizō [Bodhisattva], the Lotus Sutra [e.g. Nichiren Buddhism], or the Pure Land of Amida in the hearts of most ordinary, and many high-ranking, Japanese samurai... Zen in the Kamakura and Muromachi periods can be called “the religion of the samurai” only in the sense that most patrons of Zen were samurai, not in the sense that it was practiced assiduously or exclusive by all, or even perhaps the majority, of those who would be described as warriors.

== Culture ==
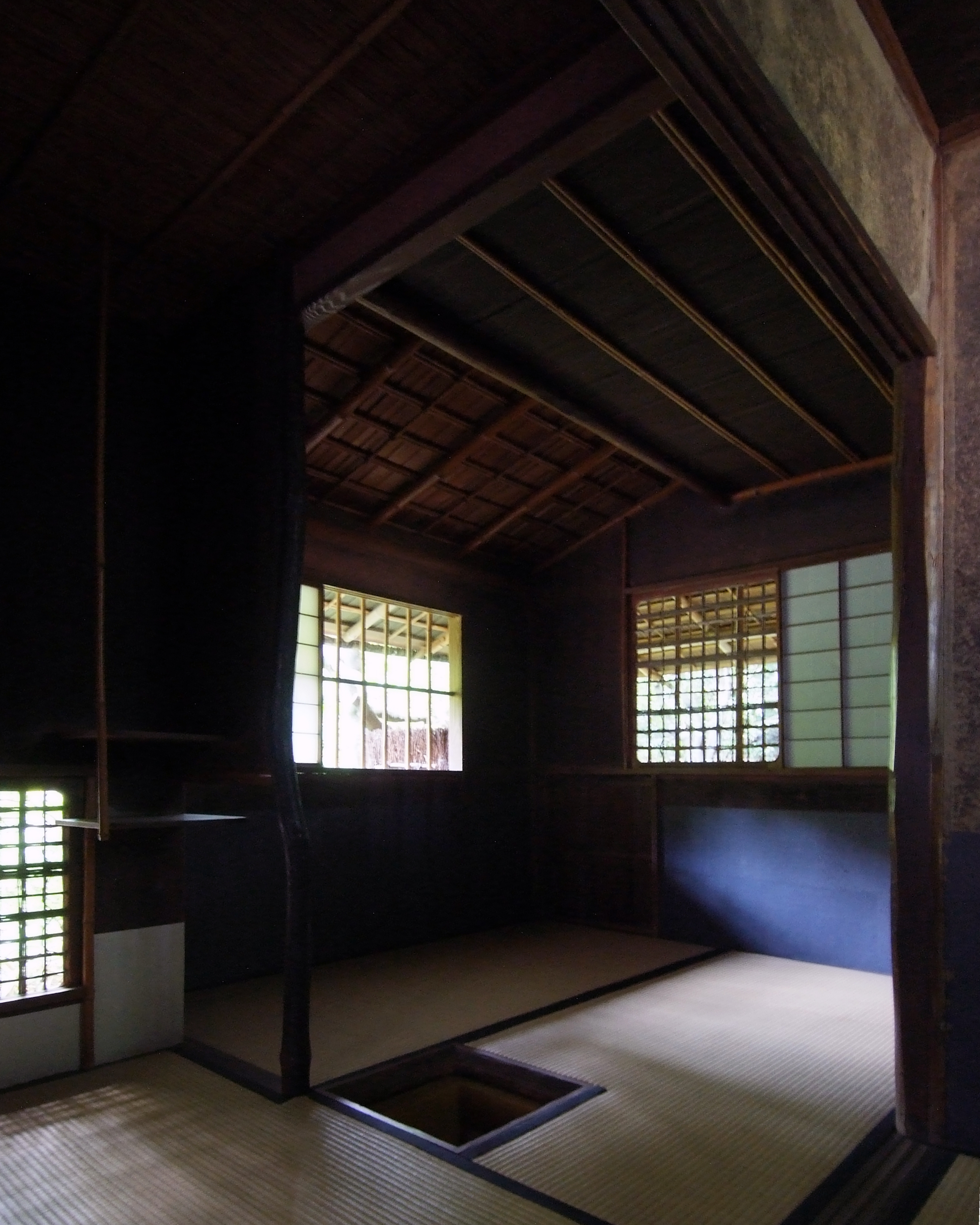
The chashitsu (small tea room) was a place of politics and socializing for lords and samurai.

Waka (Japanese poetry), noh (Japanese dance-drama), kemari (Japanese football game), tea ceremony, and ikebana (Japanese flower arranging) were some of the cultural pursuits enjoyed by the aristocratic samurai in the Sengoku Period.

Waka poems were also used as jisei no ku (辞世の句, death poems). Hosokawa Gracia, Asano Naganori, and Takasugi Shinsaku are famous for their jisei no ku.

Noh and kemari were promoted by the Ashikaga shogunate and became popular among daimyo (feudal lords) and samurai. During the Sengoku period, the appreciation of noh and the practice of tea ceremonies were valued for socializing and exchanging information, and were essential cultural pursuits for daimyo and samurai. The view of life and death expressed in noh plays was something the samurai of the time could relate to. Owning tea utensils used in the tea ceremony was a matter of prestige for daimyo and samurai, and in some cases tea utensils were given in exchange for land as a reward for military service. The chashitsu (small tea room) was also used as a place for political meetings, as it was suitable for secret talks, and the tea ceremony sometimes brought together samurai and townspeople who did not normally interact.

=== Education ===
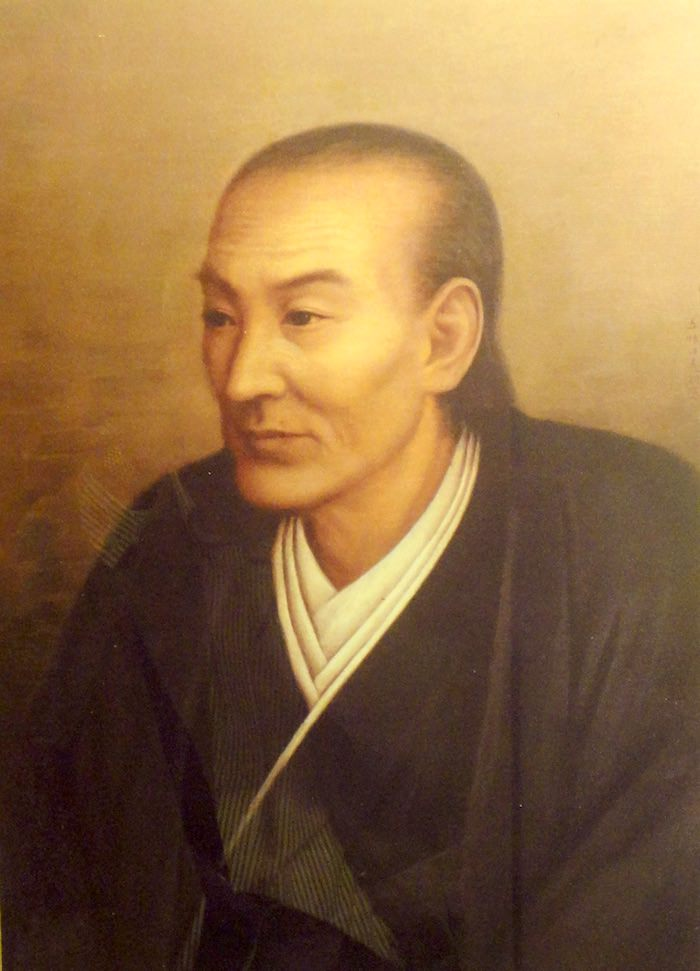
Kōan Ogata, a samurai, physician and rangaku scholar in late Edo period Japan, noted for establishing an academy which later developed into Osaka University

In general, samurai, aristocrats, and priests had a very high literacy rate in kanji. Recent studies have shown that literacy in kanji among other groups in society was somewhat higher than previously understood. For example, court documents, birth and death records and marriage records from the Kamakura period, submitted by farmers, were prepared in Kanji. Both the kanji literacy rate and skills in mathematics improved toward the end of Kamakura period.

Some samurai had buke bunko, or "warrior library", a personal library that held texts on strategy, the science of warfare, and other documents that would have proved useful during the warring era of feudal Japan. One such library held 20,000 volumes. The upper class had Kuge bunko, or "family libraries", that held classics, Buddhist sacred texts, and family histories, as well as genealogical records.

There were to Lord Eirin's character many high points difficult to measure, but according to the elders the foremost of these was the way he governed the province by his civility. It goes without saying that he acted this way toward those in the samurai class, but he was also polite in writing letters to the farmers and townspeople, and even in addressing these letters he was gracious beyond normal practice. In this way, all were willing to sacrifice their lives for him and become his allies.

In a letter dated 29 January 1552, St Francis Xavier observed the ease of which the Japanese understood prayers due to the high level of literacy in Japan at that time:

In a letter to Father Ignatius Loyola at Rome, Xavier further noted the education of the upper classes:

The Nobles send their sons to monasteries to be educated as soon as they are 8 years old, and they remain there until they are 19 or 20, learning reading, writing and religion; as soon as they come out, they marry and apply themselves to politics.

=== Names ===
A samurai was usually named by combining one kanji from his father or grandfather and one new kanji. Samurai normally used only a small part of their total name.

For example, the full name of Oda Nobunaga was "Oda Kazusanosuke Saburo Nobunaga" (織田上総介三郎信長), in which "Oda" is a clan or family name, "Kazusanosuke" is a title of vice-governor of Kazusa province, "Saburo" is a formal nickname (yobina), and "Nobunaga" is an adult name (nanori) given at genpuku, the coming of age ceremony. A man was addressed by his family name and his title, or by his yobina if he did not have a title. However, the nanori was a private name that could be used by only a very few, including the emperor. Samurai could choose their own nanori and frequently changed their names to reflect their allegiances.

Samurai were given the privilege of carrying two swords and using 'samurai surnames' to identify themselves from the common people.

=== Marriage ===
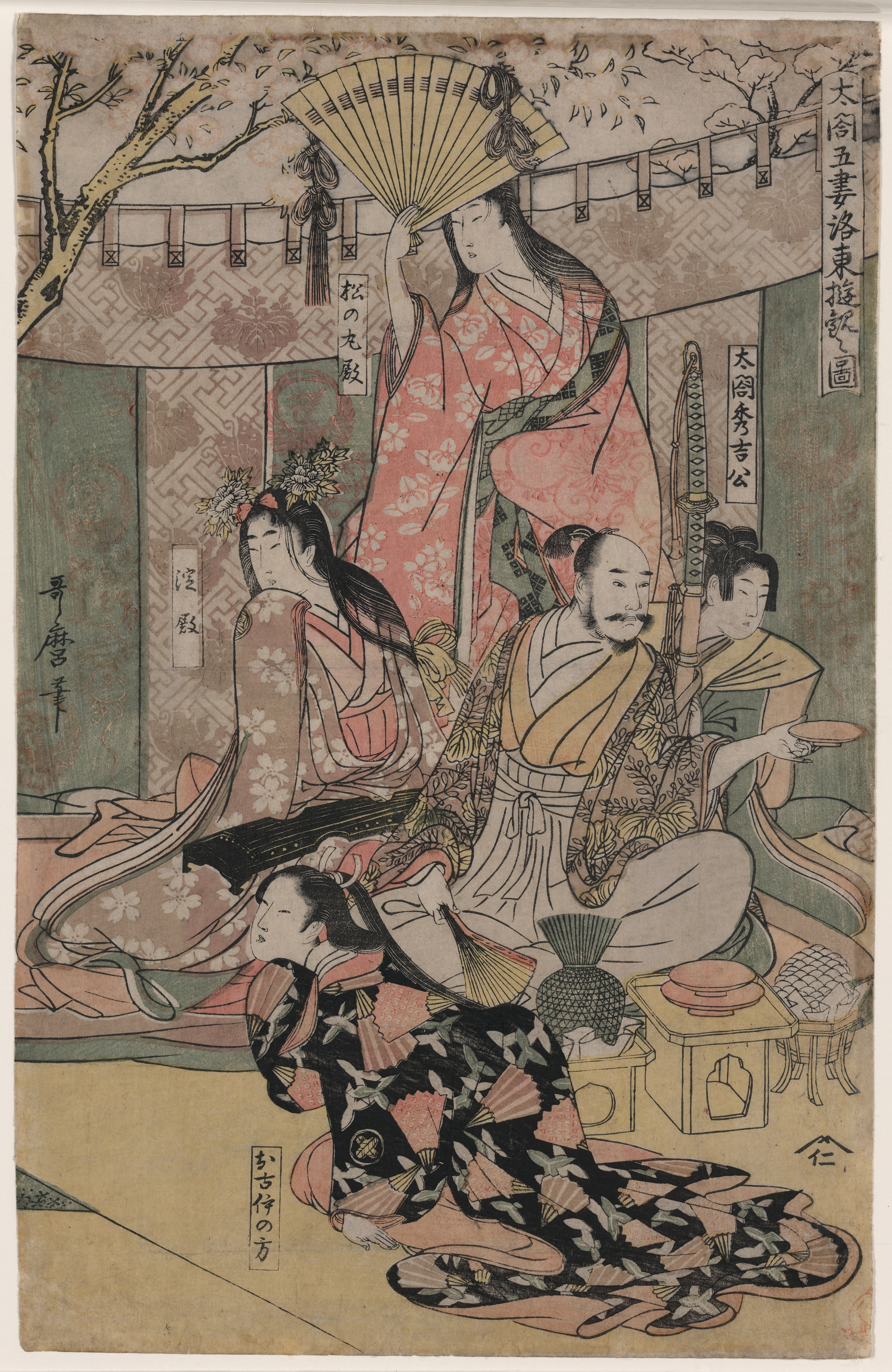
Toyotomi Hideyoshi with his wives and concubines

Samurai had arranged marriages, which were arranged by a go-between of the same or higher rank. While for those samurai in the upper ranks this was a necessity (as most had few opportunities to meet women), this was a formality for lower-ranked samurai. Most samurai married women from a samurai family, but for lower-ranked samurai, marriages with commoners were permitted. In these marriages a dowry was brought by the woman and was used to set up the couple's new household.

A samurai could take concubines, but their backgrounds were checked by higher-ranked samurai. In many cases, taking a concubine was akin to a marriage. Kidnapping a concubine, although common in fiction, would have been shameful, if not criminal. If the concubine was a commoner, a messenger was sent with betrothal money or a note for exemption of tax to ask for her parents' acceptance. Even though the woman would not be a legal wife, a situation normally considered a demotion, many wealthy merchants believed that being the concubine of a samurai was superior to being the legal wife of a commoner. When a merchant's daughter married a samurai, her family's money erased the samurai's debts, and the samurai's social status improved the standing of the merchant family. If a samurai's commoner concubine gave birth to a son, the son could inherit his father's social status.

A samurai could divorce his wife for a variety of reasons with approval from a superior, but divorce was, while not entirely nonexistent, a rare event. A wife's failure to produce a son was cause for divorce, but adoption of a male heir was considered an acceptable alternative to divorce. A samurai could divorce for personal reasons, even if he simply did not like his wife, but this was generally avoided as it would embarrass the person who had arranged the marriage. A woman could also arrange a divorce, although it would generally take the form of the samurai divorcing her. After a divorce, samurai had to return the betrothal money, which often prevented divorces.

== Women ==
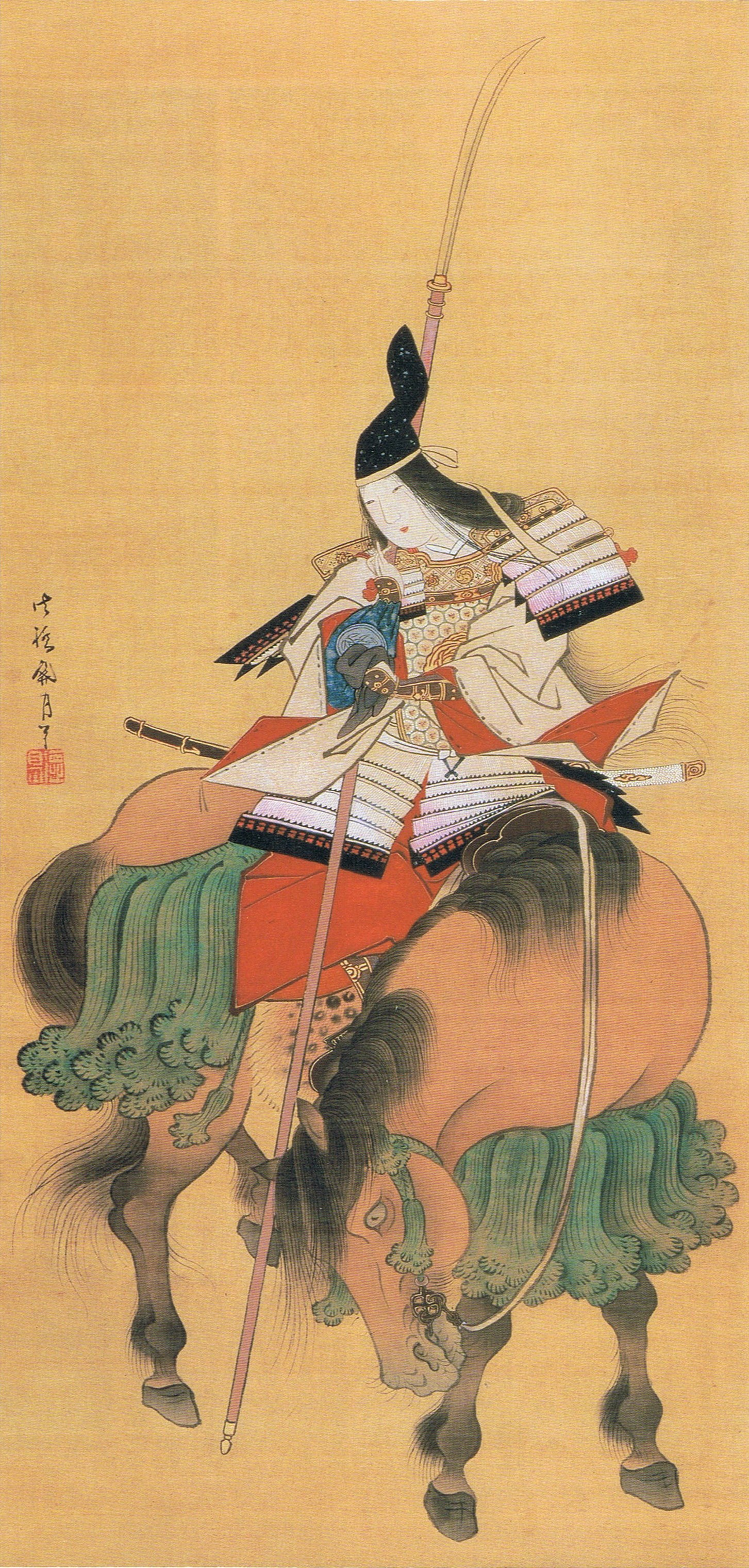
Tomoe Gozen by Shitomi Kangetsu, c. 18th century

Maintaining the household was the main duty of women of the samurai class. This was especially crucial during early feudal Japan, when warrior husbands were often traveling abroad or engaged in clan battles. The wife, or okugatasama (meaning: one who remains in the home), was left to manage all household affairs, care for the children, and perhaps even defend the home forcibly. For this reason, many women of the samurai class were trained in wielding a polearm called a naginata or a special knife called the kaiken in an art called tantojutsu (lit. the skill of the knife), which they could use to protect their household, family, and honor if the need arose. There were women who actively engaged in battles alongside male samurai in Japan, although most of these female warriors were not formal samurai.

A samurai's daughter's greatest duty was political marriage. These women married members of enemy clans of their families to form diplomatic relationships. These alliances were stages for many intrigues, wars and tragedies throughout Japanese history. A woman could divorce her husband if he did not treat her well and also if he was a traitor to his wife's family. A famous case was that of Oda Tokuhime (daughter of Oda Nobunaga); irritated by the antics of her mother-in-law, Lady Tsukiyama (the wife of Tokugawa Ieyasu), she was able to get Lady Tsukiyama arrested on suspicion of communicating with the Takeda clan (then a great enemy of Nobunaga and the Oda clan). Ieyasu also arrested his own son, Matsudaira Nobuyasu, who was Tokuhime's husband, because Nobuyasu was close to his mother Lady Tsukiyama. To assuage his ally Nobunaga, Ieyasu had Lady Tsukiyama executed in 1579 and that same year ordered his son to commit seppuku to prevent him from seeking revenge for the death of his mother.

Though women of wealthier samurai families enjoyed perks of their elevated position in society, such as avoiding the physical labor that those of lower classes often engaged in, they were still viewed as far beneath men. Women were prohibited from engaging in any political affairs and were usually not the heads of their household. This does not mean that women in the samurai class were always powerless. Samurai women wielded power at various occasions. Throughout history, several women of the samurai class have acquired political power and influence, even though they have not received these privileges de jure.

After Ashikaga Yoshimasa, 8th shōgun of the Muromachi shogunate, lost interest in politics, his wife Hino Tomiko largely ruled in his place. Nene, wife of Toyotomi Hideyoshi, was known to overrule her husband's decisions at times, and Yodo-dono, his concubine, became the de facto master of Osaka castle and the Toyotomi clan after Hideyoshi's death. Tachibana Ginchiyo was chosen to lead the Tachibana clan after her father's death. Yamauchi Chiyo, wife of Yamauchi Kazutoyo, has long been considered the ideal samurai wife. According to legend, she made her kimono out of a quilted patchwork of bits of old cloth and saved pennies to buy her husband a magnificent horse, on which he rode to many victories. The fact that Chiyo (though she is better known as "Wife of Yamauchi Kazutoyo") is held in such high esteem for her economic sense is illuminating in the light of the fact that she never produced an heir and the Yamauchi clan was succeeded by Kazutoyo's younger brother. The source of power for women might have been that samurai left their finances to their wives. Several women ascended the Chrysanthemum Throne as a female imperial ruler (女性天皇, josei tennō)

As the Tokugawa period progressed more value became placed on education, and the education of females beginning at a young age became important to families and society as a whole. Marriage criteria began to weigh intelligence and education as desirable attributes in a wife, right along with physical attractiveness. Though many of the texts written for women during the Tokugawa period only pertained to how a woman could become a successful wife and household manager, there were those that undertook the challenge of learning to read, and also tackled philosophical and literary classics. Nearly all women of the samurai class were literate by the end of the Tokugawa period.

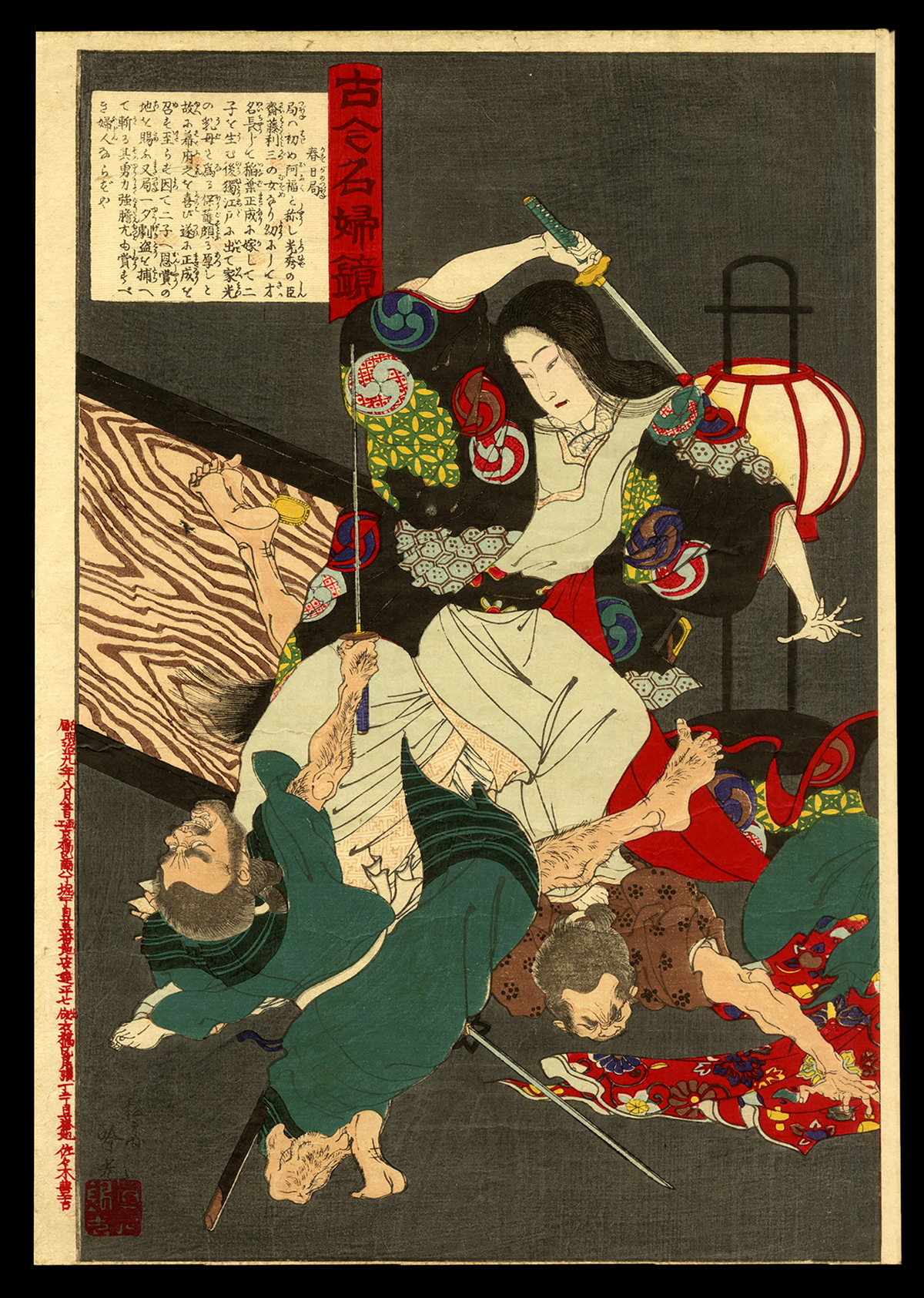
Kasuga no Tsubone fighting robbers – Adachi Ginko (c. 1880)

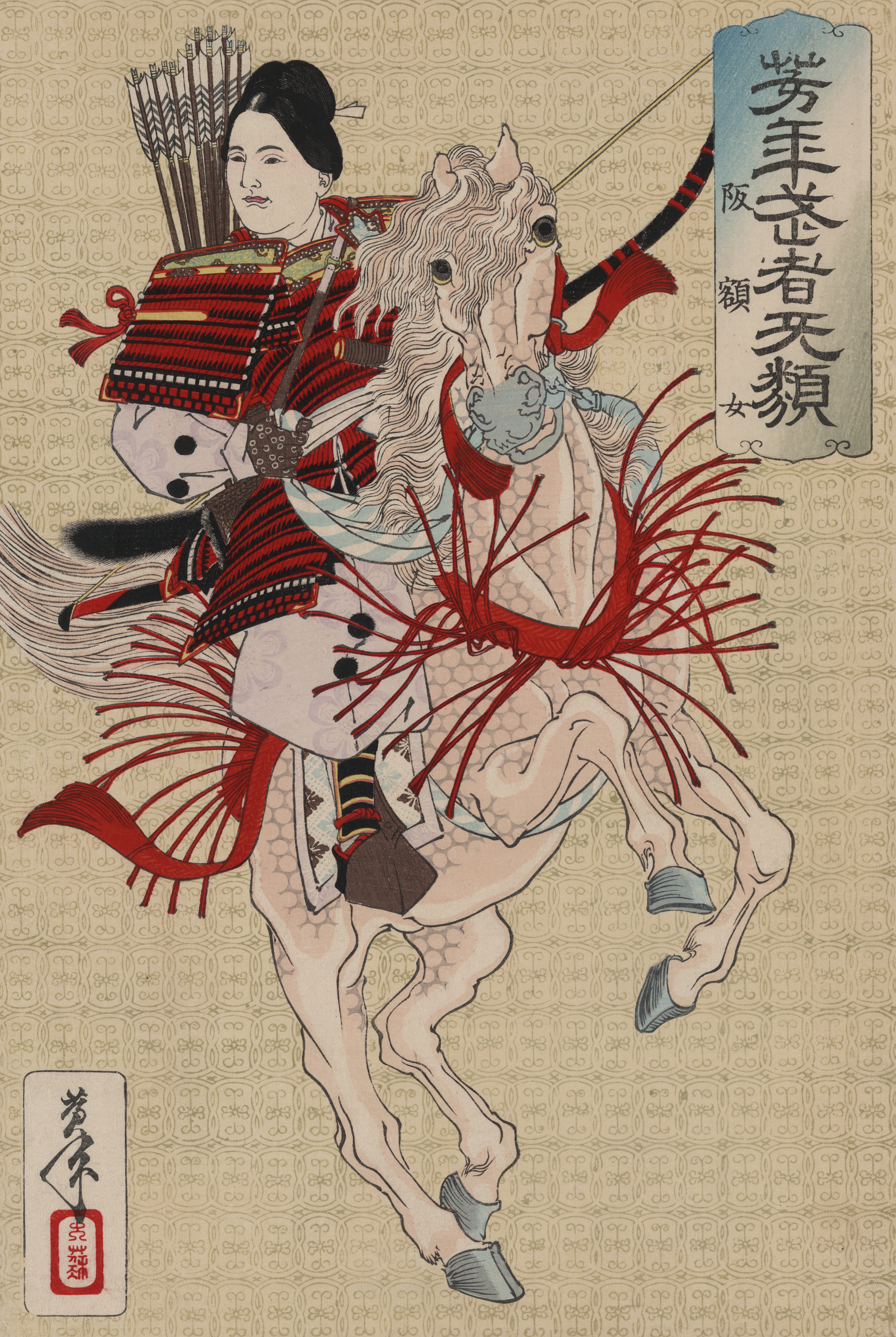
Hangaku Gozen by Yoshitoshi, c. 1885

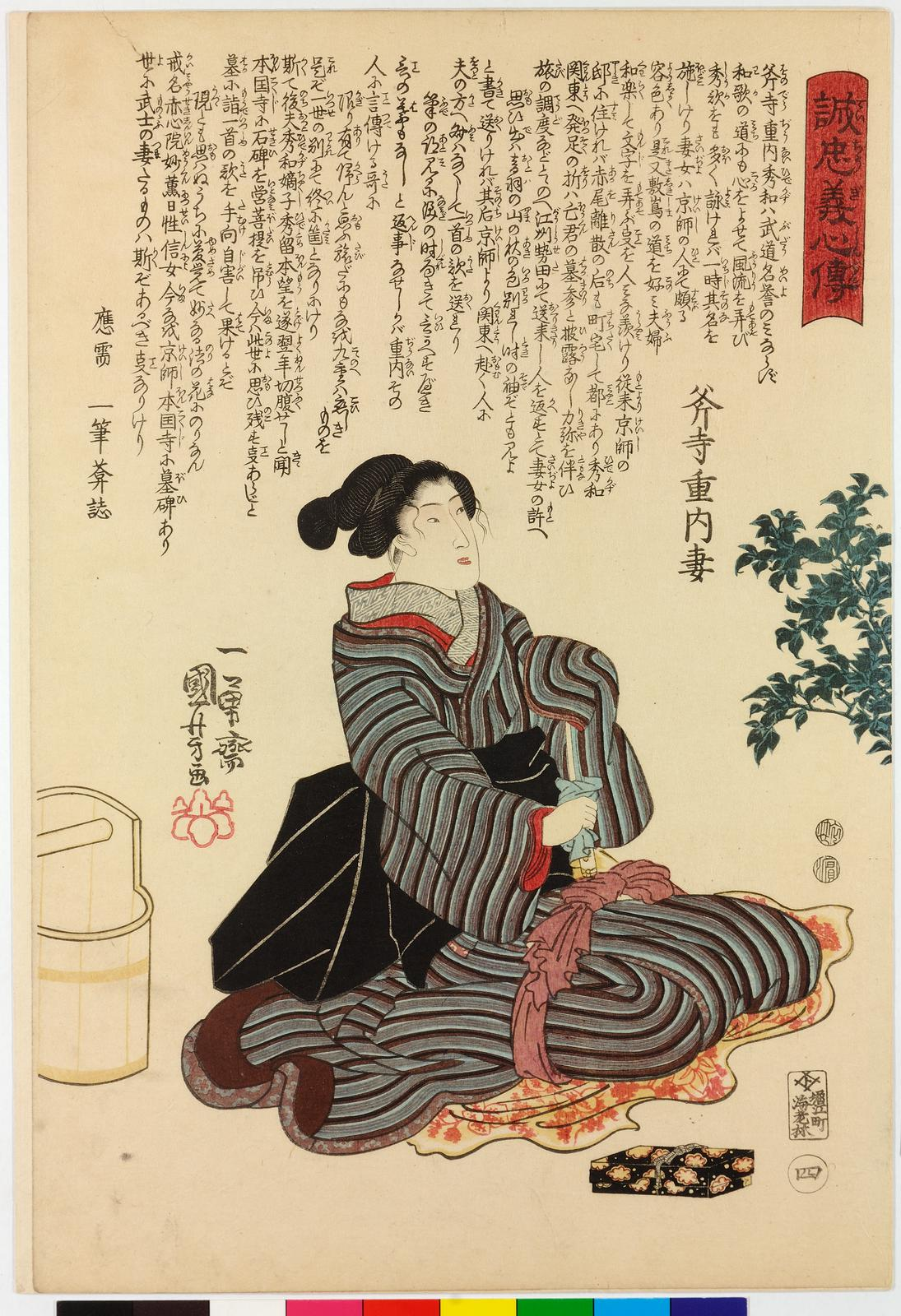
Japanese woman preparing for ritual suicide

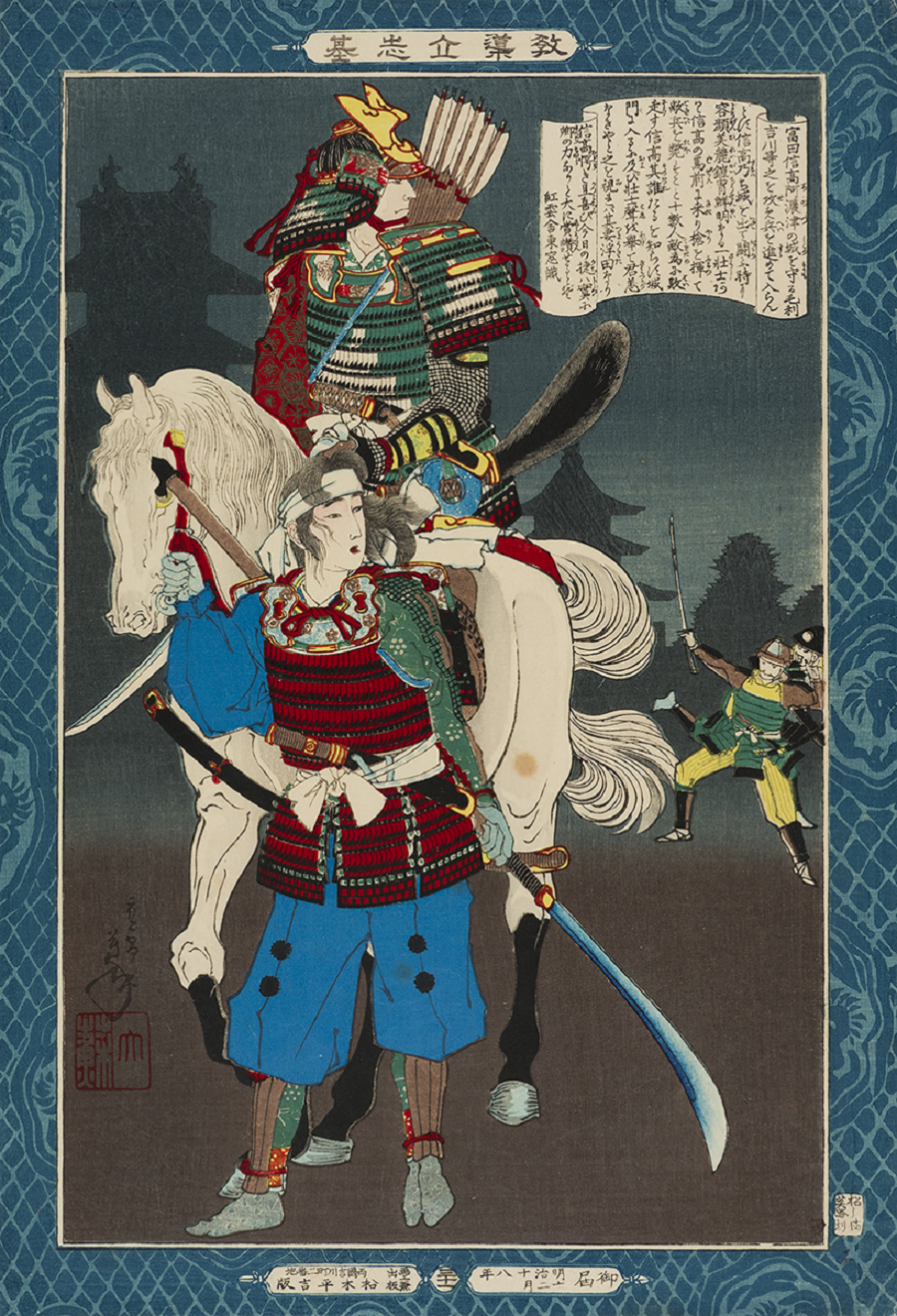
Yuki no Kata defending Tsu Castle. 18th century

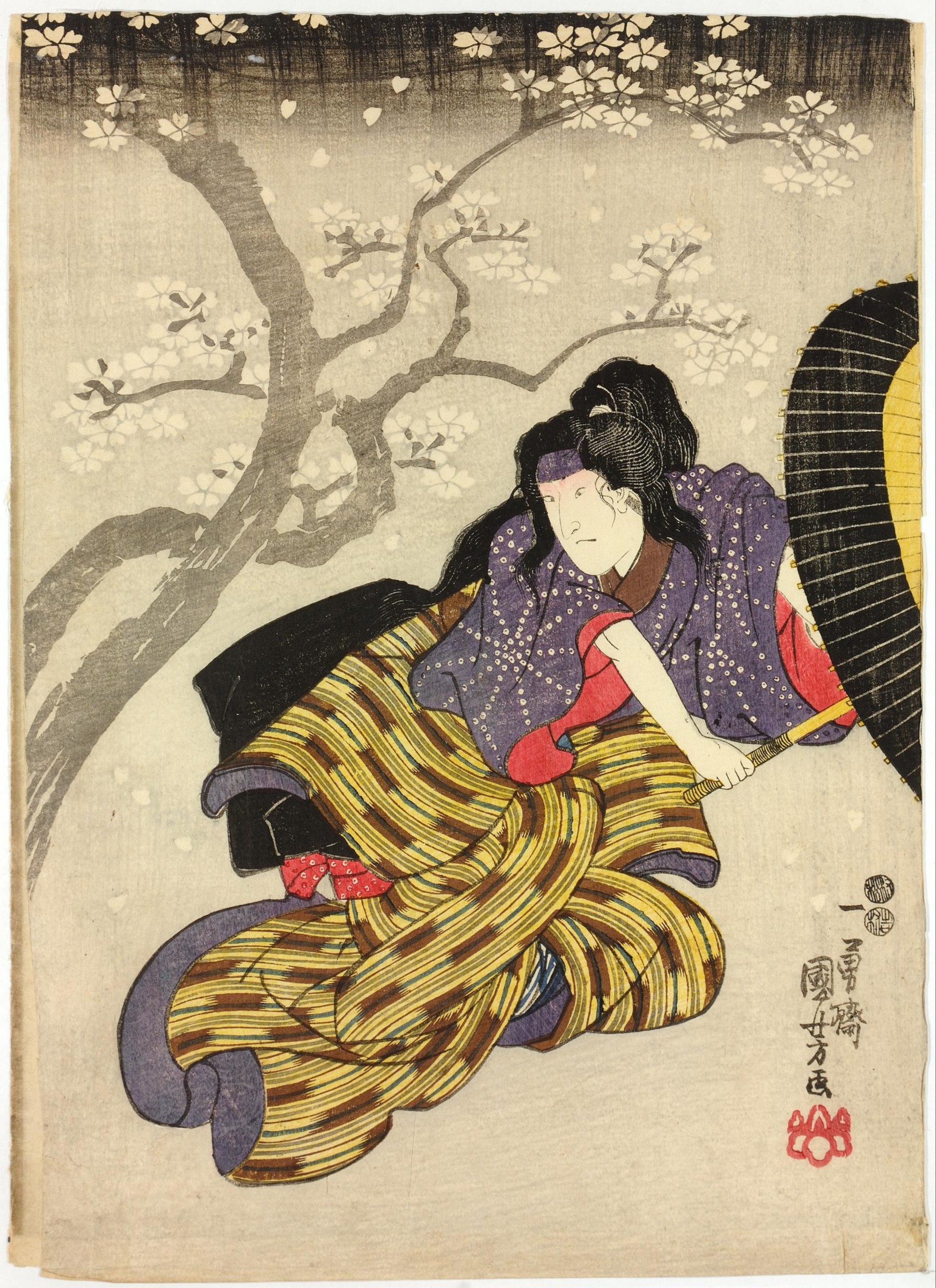
A samurai class woman

== In popular culture ==
Much of "everything we think we know about Japan's warrior elite" has been challenged; many ideas about the samurai myth, including the word "samurai" itself, evolved in mass media and pop culture long after the heyday of the warriors. Samurai women, for example, although not part of the legend, were educated, governed and even fought; and there was a balance between the military, and the literary and artistic. A major exhibition at the British Museum, "Samurai", from 3 February – 4 May 2026, revealed a world beyond armor-clad warriors and epic duels.

Samurai figures have been the subject for legends, folk tales, dramatic stories (i.e. gunki monogatari), theater productions in kabuki and noh, in literature, movies, animated and anime films, television shows, manga, video games, and in various musical pieces in genre that range from enka to J-Pop songs.

Jidaigeki (literally historical drama) has always been a staple program on Japanese movies and television. The programs typically feature a samurai. Samurai films and westerns share a number of similarities, and the two have influenced each other over the years. One of Japan's most renowned directors, Akira Kurosawa, greatly influenced western film-making. George Lucas' Star Wars series incorporated many stylistic traits pioneered by Kurosawa, and Star Wars: A New Hope takes in part its core story of a rescued princess being transported to a secret base from Kurosawa's The Hidden Fortress. Kurosawa was inspired by the works of director John Ford, and in turn Kurosawa's works have been remade into westerns such as Seven Samurai into The Magnificent Seven and Yojimbo into A Fistful of Dollars. There is also a 26-episode anime adaptation (Samurai 7) of Seven Samurai. Along with film, literature containing samurai influences are seen as well. As well as influence from American Westerns, Kurosawa also adapted two of Shakespeare's plays as sources for samurai movies: Throne of Blood was based on Macbeth, and Ran was based on King Lear.

Most common are historical works where the protagonist is either a samurai or former samurai (or another rank or position) who possesses considerable martial skill. Eiji Yoshikawa is one of the most famous Japanese historical novelists. His retellings of popular works, including Taiko, Musashi and The Tale of the Heike, are popular among readers for their epic narratives and rich realism in depicting samurai and warrior culture. The samurai have also appeared frequently in Japanese comics (manga) and animation (anime). Examples are Samurai Champloo, Shigurui, Requiem from the Darkness, Muramasa: The Demon Blade, and Afro Samurai. Samurai-like characters are not just restricted to historical settings, and a number of works set in the modern age, and even the future, include characters who live, train and fight like samurai. Some of these works have made their way to the west, where it has been increasing in popularity with America.

In the 21st century, samurai have become more popular in America. Through various media, producers and writers have been capitalizing on the notion that Americans admire the samurai lifestyle. The animated series, Afro Samurai, became well-liked in American popular culture because of its blend of hack-and-slash animation and gritty urban music. Created by Takashi Okazaki, Afro Samurai was initially a dōjinshi, or manga series, which was then made into an animated series by Studio Gonzo. In 2007, the animated series debuted on American cable television on the Spike TV channel. The series was produced for American viewers which "embodies the trend... comparing hip-hop artists to samurai warriors, an image some rappers claim for themselves". The story line keeps in tone with the perception of a samurai finding vengeance against someone who has wronged him. Because of its popularity, Afro Samurai was adopted into a full feature animated film and also became titles on gaming consoles such as the PlayStation 3 and Xbox. Not only has the samurai culture been adopted into animation and video games, it can also be seen in comic books.

The tokusatsu television series Samurai Sentai Shinkenger is inspired by the way of the samurai.

== See also ==
- List of Japanese battles
- List of samurai
- Musha shugyō
- Ninja
- Pechin
- Kabukimono
- Seiwa Genji
- Shudō
- Shi
- Hwarang
- Kheshig

== Bibliography ==
- Absolon, Trevor. Samurai Armour: Volume I: The Japanese Cuirass (Bloomsbury Publishing, 2017).
- Anderson, Patricia E. "Roles of Samurai Women: Social Norms and Inner Conflicts During Japan's Tokugawa Period, 1603–1868". New Views on Gender 15 (2015): 30–37. online
- Ansart, Olivier. "Lust, Commerce and Corruption: An Account of What I Have Seen and Heard by an Edo Samurai". Asian Studies Review 39.3 (2015): 529–530.
- Benesch, Oleg. Inventing the Way of the Samurai: Nationalism, Internationalism, and Bushido in Modern Japan (Oxford UP, 2014). ISBN 978-0-19-870662-5
- Benesch, Oleg. "Comparing Warrior Traditions: How the Janissaries and Samurai Maintained Their Status and Privileges During Centuries of Peace." Comparative Civilizations Review 55.55 (2006): 6:37–55 Online.
- Benjamin Duke (2019). Dr. David Murray: Superintendent of Education in the Empire of Japan, 1873-1879. Rutgers University Press. ISBN 9780813594996.
- Clements, Jonathan. A Brief History of the Samurai (Running Press, 2010) ISBN 0-7624-3850-9
- Coleridge, Henry James. the Life and Letters of St. Francis Xavier. Forgotten Books. ISBN 978-1-4510-0048-1.
- Cummins, Antony, and Mieko Koizumi. The Lost Samurai School (North Atlantic Books, 2016) 17th century Samurai textbook on combat; heavily illustrated.
- Karl F. Friday (1992). Hired Swords: The Rise of Private Warrior Power in Early Japan. Stanford University Press. ISBN 0-8047-2696-5.
- Gwynne Dyer (1985). War. Crown. ISBN 9780517556153.
- Hubbard, Ben. The Samurai Warrior: The Golden Age of Japan's Elite Warriors 1560–1615 (Amber Books, 2015).
- Jaundrill, D. Colin. Samurai to Soldier: Remaking Military Service in Nineteenth-Century Japan (Cornell UP, 2016).
- Mark Ravina (2017). To Stand with the Nations of the World: Japan's Meiji Restoration in World History. Oxford University Press. ISBN 978-0-19-532771-7.
- Kinmonth, Earl H. Self-Made Man in Meiji Japanese Thought: From Samurai to Salary Man (1981) 385pp.
- Ogata, Ken. "End of the Samurai: A Study of Deinstitutionalization Processes". Academy of Management Proceedings Vol. 2015. No. 1.
- Sharf, Robert H. (August 1993). "The Zen of Japanese Nationalism". History of Religions. 33 (1). University of Chicago Press: 1–43. doi:10.1086/463354. S2CID 161535877.
- Thorne, Roland. Samurai films (Oldcastle Books, 2010).
- Turnbull, Stephen. The Samurai: A Military History (1996).
- Kure, Mitsuo. Samurai: an illustrated history (2014).
- Wilson, William Scott (1982). Ideals of the Samurai: Writings of Japanese Warriors. Kodansha. ISBN 0-89750-081-4.

=== Historiography ===
- Howland, Douglas R. "Samurai status, class, and bureaucracy: A historiographical essay". The Journal of Asian Studies. 60.2 (2001): 353–380. doi:10.2307/2659697 online.
