= Watagami =

Watagami may refer to:

- shoulder straps of the dō-yoroi, made of leather with attached metal plates
- Cotton candy
