= O-yoroi Armor of Ashikaga Takauji =

Armor of shogun Ashikaga Takauji

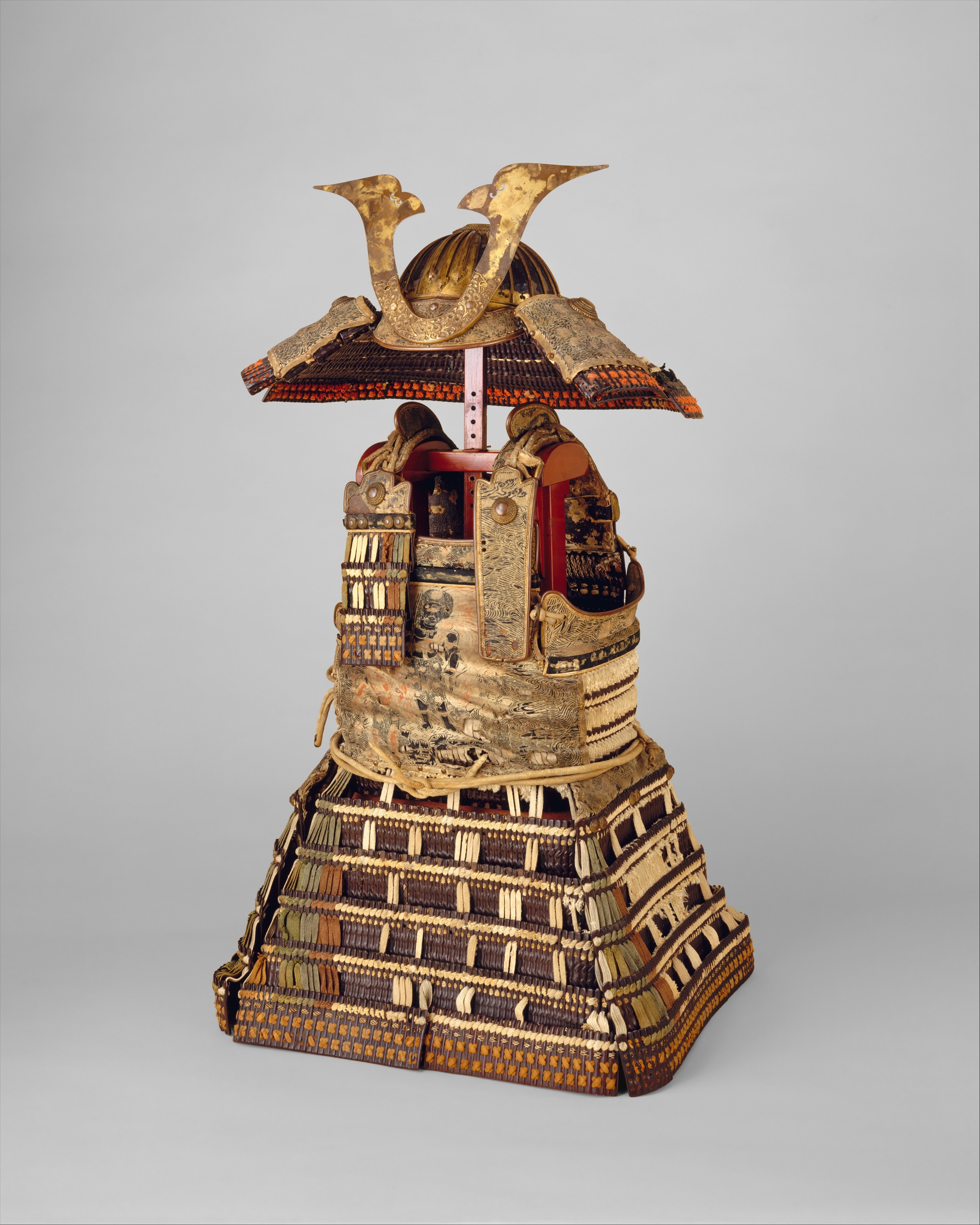
- Year: early 14th century, ca. 1336
- Medium: Iron, lacquer, leather, silk, gilt copper, gold, pigments
- Dimensions: 108.59 cm × 61.6 cm (42.75 in × 24.3 in); 11.77 kilograms (25.9 lb)
- Location: Metropolitan Museum of Art; New York City

The O-yoroi Armor of Ashikaga Takauji [白絲威褄取鎧（しろいとおどしつまどりよろい)] Shiro-ito Odoshi Tsumadori O-yoroi) is a piece of Japanese armour made for the shogun of the Ashikaga shogunate, Ashikaga Takauji. This piece of armor belongs in the Arms and Armor Department of the Metropolitan Museum of Art.

== History ==
From 1185 to 1333, the Kamakura shogunate was dominated by members of the Minamoto clan, the Fujiwara clan, minor princes of the Imperial family, and members of the Hojo clan. The collapse of the Hojo clan was a result of the Genkō War, where power of the Kamakura shogunate was temporarily transferred to Emperor Go-Daigo in the Kenmu Restoration, the return of Imperial rule. The restoration lasted only three years, to be replaced by Takauji, who marched into Kyoto and later ousted Go-Daigo in the Battle of Minatogawa.

The armor was enshrined within the Shinomura Hachimangū (篠村八幡宮) in Kameoka, Kyoto, for over 570 years. It is believed to be a donation made by Takauji during a ten-day stay at the shrine, prior to engaging Go-Daigo's forces. The armor was an offering to the kami of war, Hachiman.

=== Provenance ===
Shinomura Hachimangū was under the patronage of the Matsui family, who sold the armor to Ide Zenbei (井手善兵衛) in 1902, who owned an antique store called Jidai’ya (時代屋) on Kyōto's Shijō Street. Ide sold it to the Met's Department of Arms and Armor, Bashford Dean for 1,200 yen on July 19, 1905. Dean donated the armor to the Met in 1914.

== Armor ==
The o-yoroi was generally worn by samurai on horseback, typically possessing a cuirass and a four-sided skirt. The yoroi also had white silk and rainbow lacings, representing beauty and fortune. The breastplate is decorated with a representation of the fire deity Fudo Myoo, accompanied by boy servants Kimkara and Cetaka, representing calmness and inner strength.

There are believed to be less than 40 surviving specimens of o-yoroi.

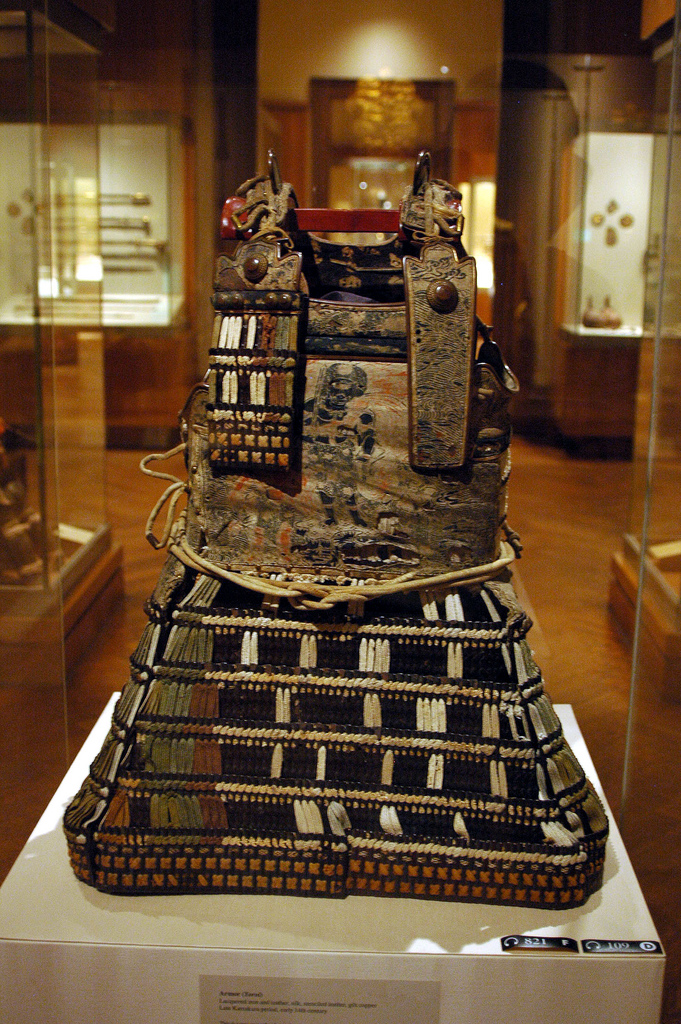

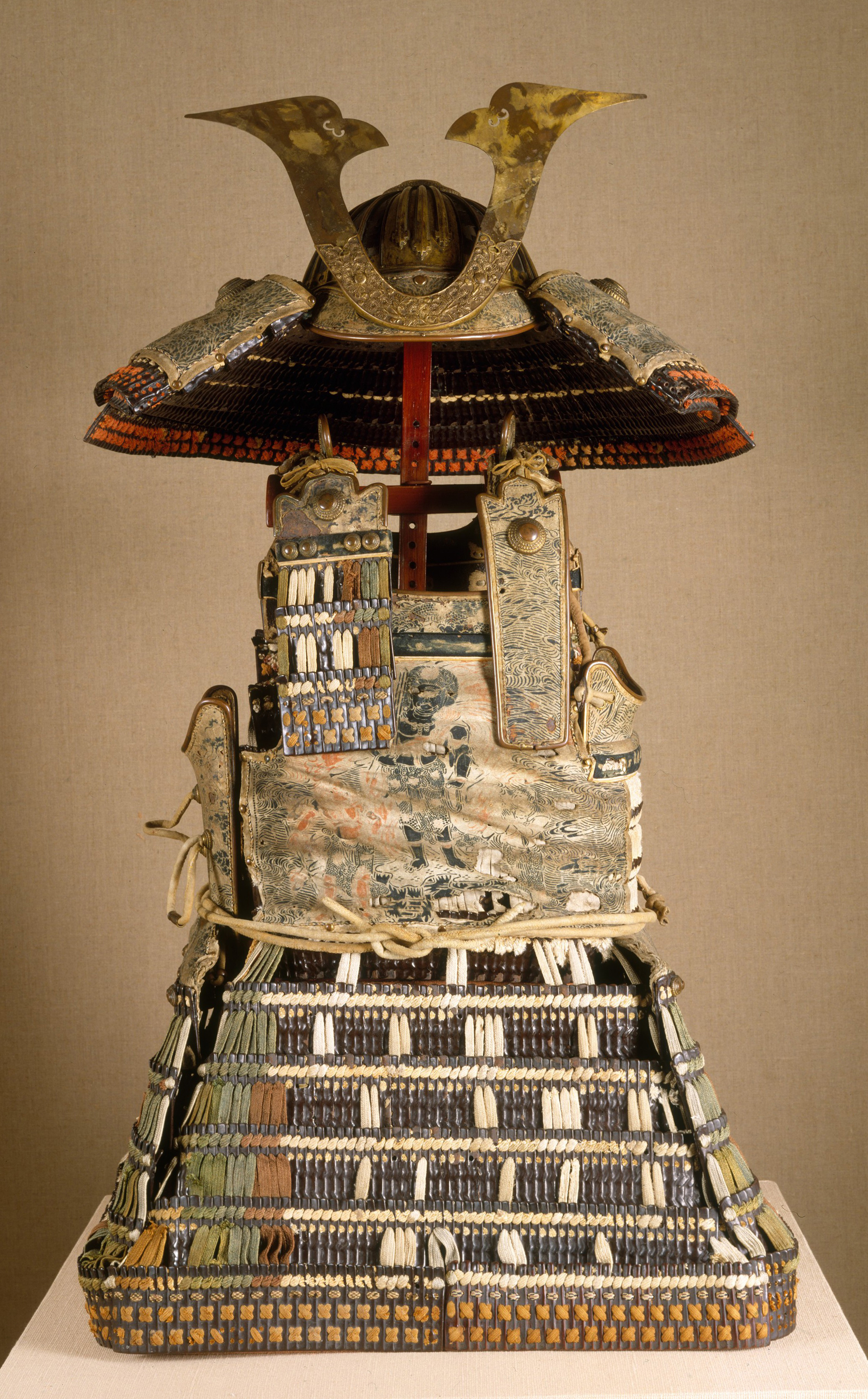

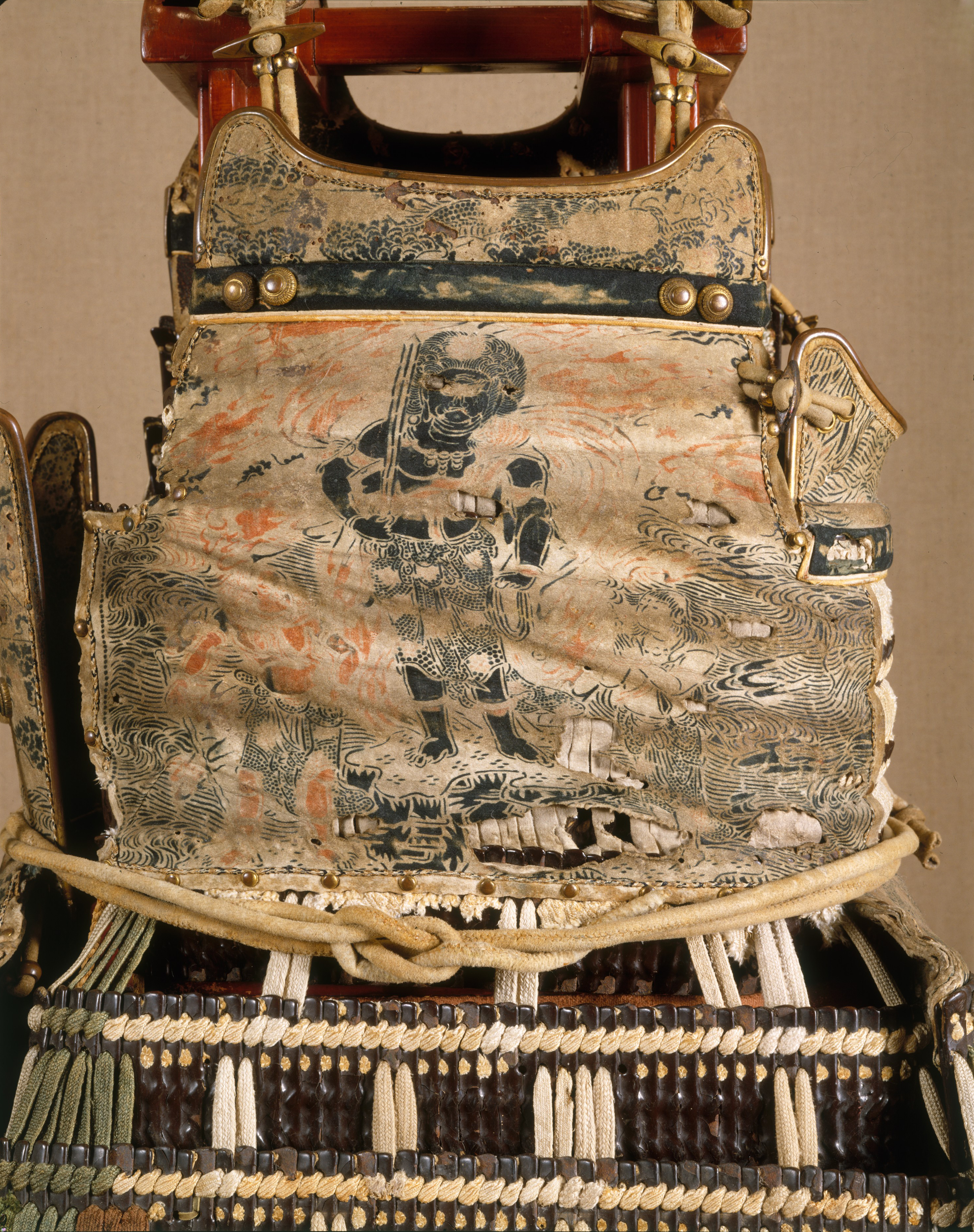

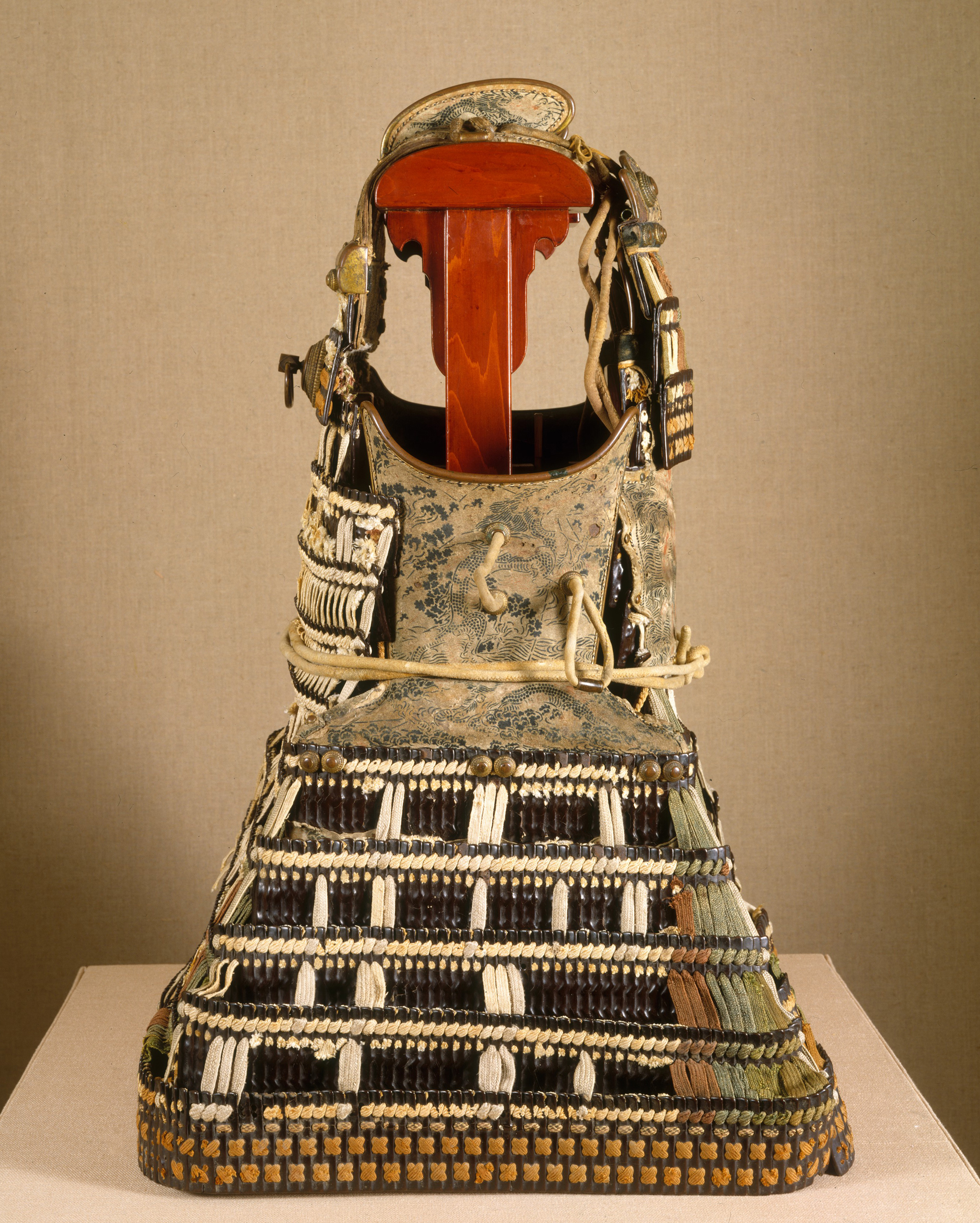
