= Men-yoroi =

Facial armour worn by Japanese samurai

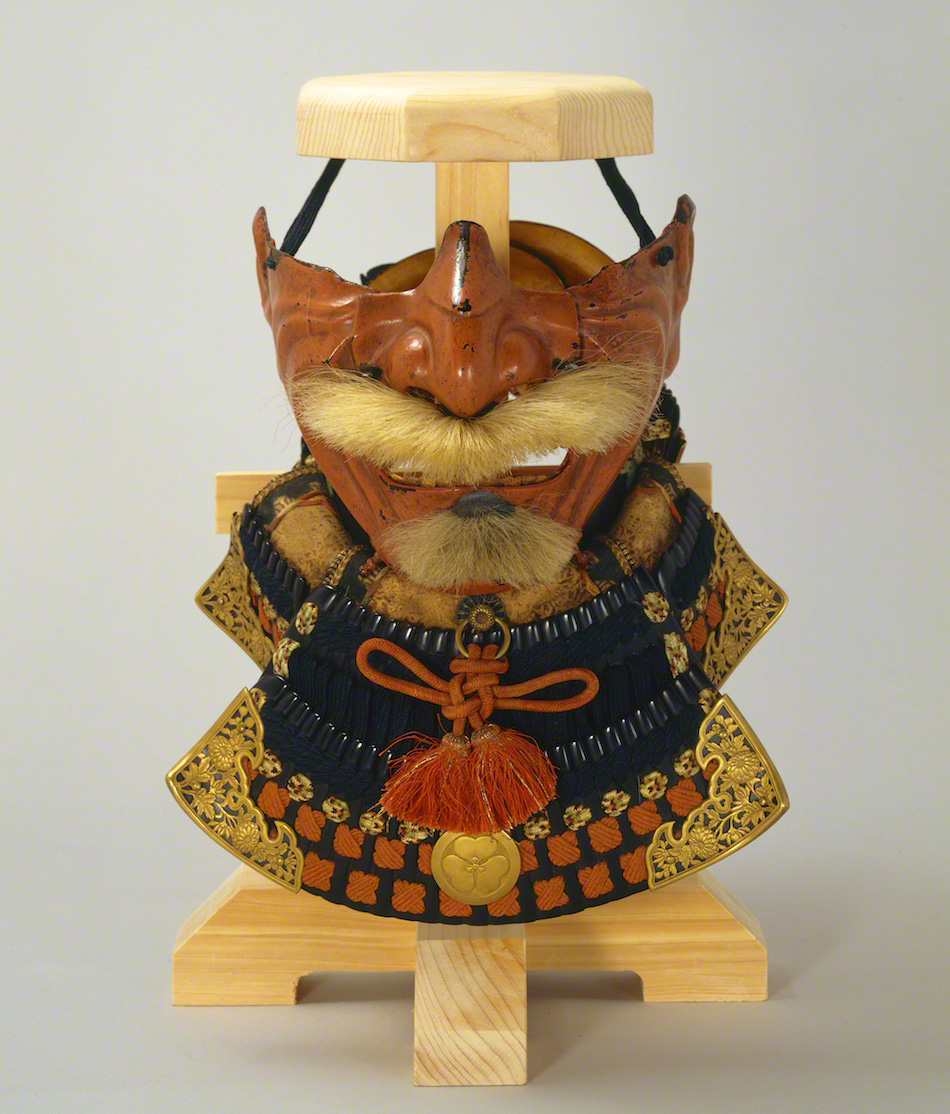
Shirohige Ressei-menpo. 18th century, Edo period. Tokyo Fuji Art Museum.

Men-yoroi (面鎧), also called menpō (面頬) or mengu (面具), are various types of facial armour that were worn by the samurai class and their retainers in feudal Japan. These include the sōmen, menpō, hanbō or hanpō, and happuri.

== Description ==
The men-yoroi, which covered all or part of the face, provided a way to secure the top-heavy kabuto (helmet). The Shinobi-no-o (chin cord) of the kabuto would be tied under the chin. Small hooks called ori-kugi or posts called odome located on various places would help secure the chin cord. The men-yoroi was constructed from iron, leather, or a combination of both. It had a lacquered or rusted type of finish and included a variety of facial details, such as a moustache, fierce teeth and a detachable nose. With the exception of the happuri, a men-yoroi had a small hole underneath the chin for sweat drainage.

== History ==
Face armour in Japan begins with the happuri, which is depicted in Heian- and Kamakura-era yamato-e paintings and is thought to have appeared during the 10th or 11th centuries. It is depicted as being worn with or without a helmet by both mounted warriors and foot retainers. By the 14th century, the hōate appears, and according to Tom Conlan, this development is behind decreased facial wound statistics. However, others, such as Yamagishi Sumio, believe that the hōate was not widespread at that time, as it—and the later menpō—restricted the vision of the wearer. Hōate are also portrayed in art and literature of the period, most notably the Aki no yo no Nagamonogatari scroll and Taiheiki. The menpō (half-mask with detachable nosepiece) and the sōmen (full face mask) are believed to have been introduced around the mid to late 15th century, and the hanbō (chin guard) in the second half of the 16th century.

== Types of men-yoroi ==
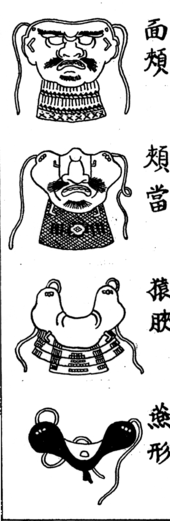
A Japanese Edo period wood block print of various types of men-yoroi or mengu (facial armour)

=== Sōmen ===
Sōmen covered the entire face.

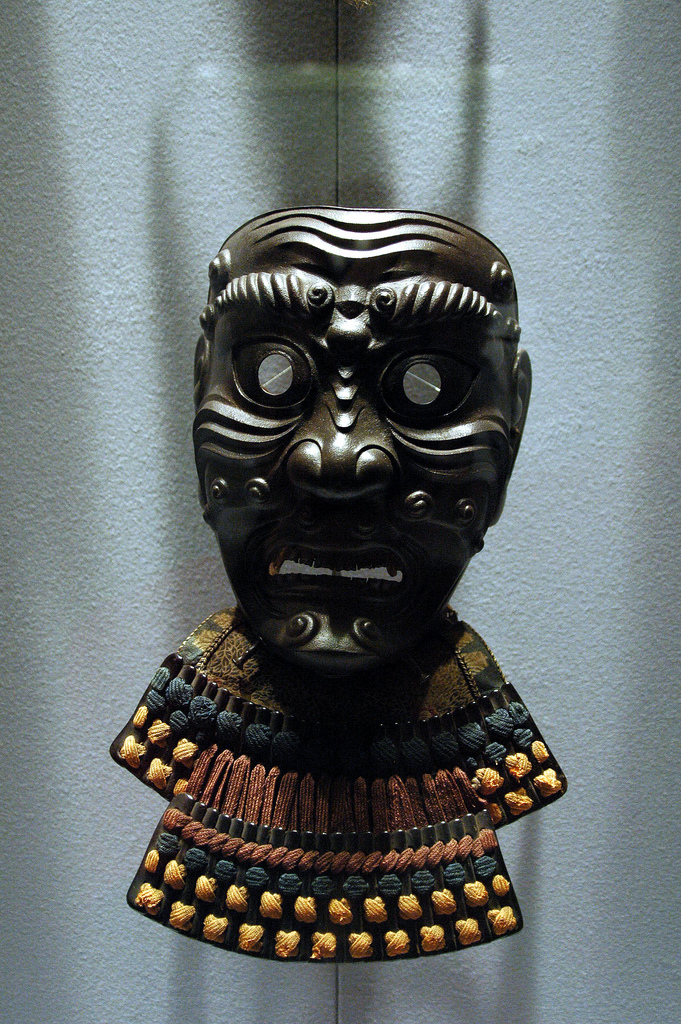

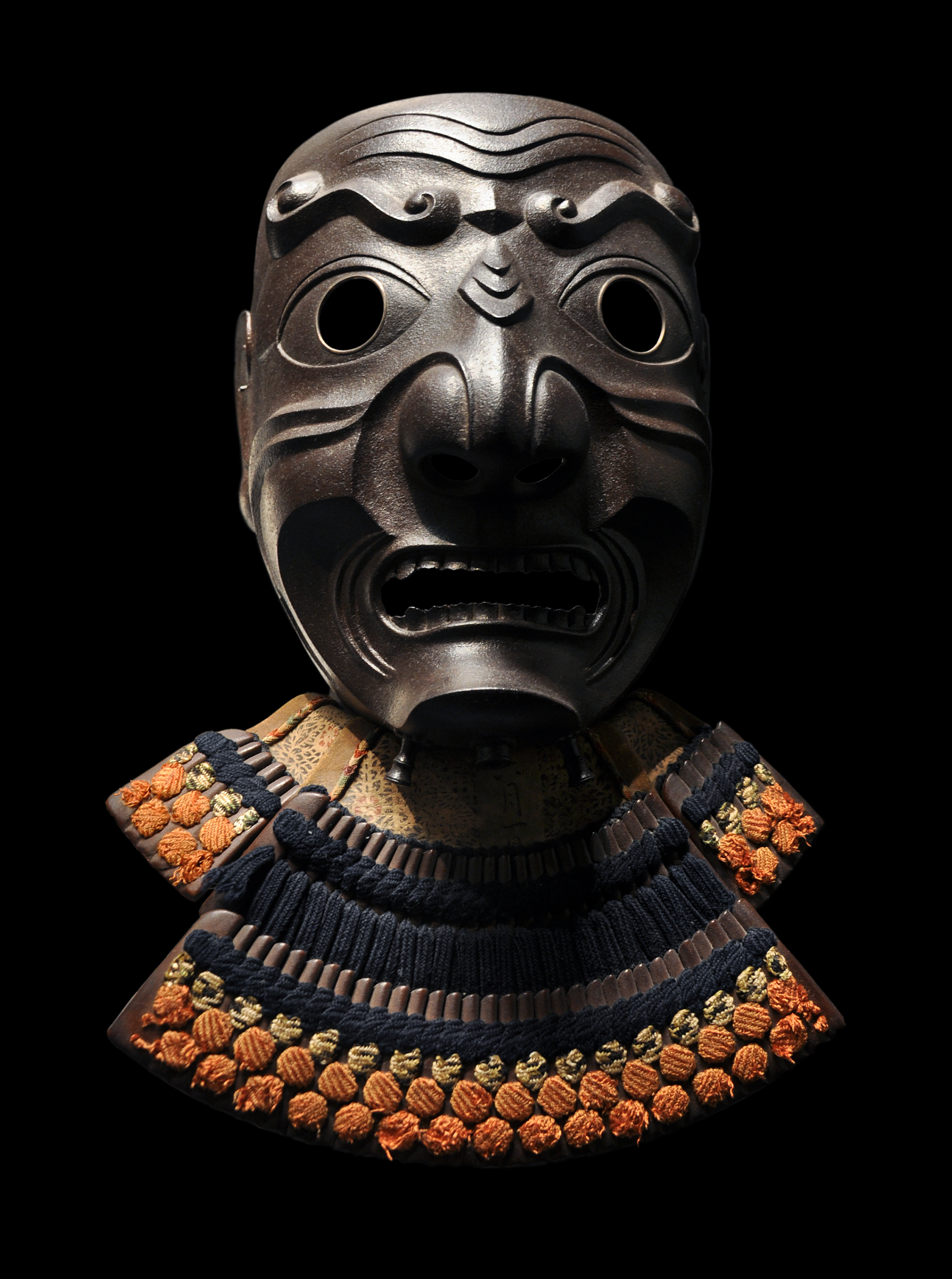

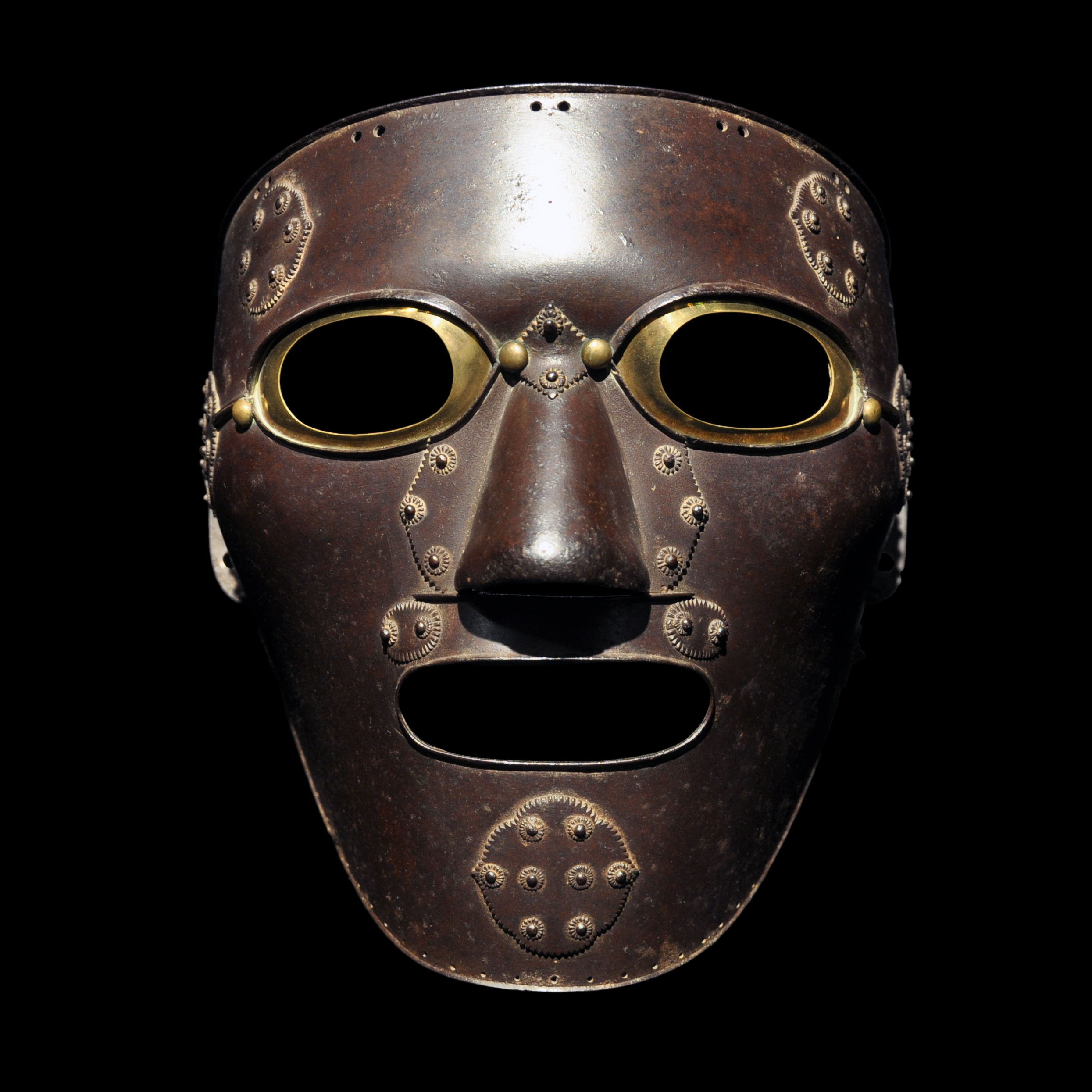

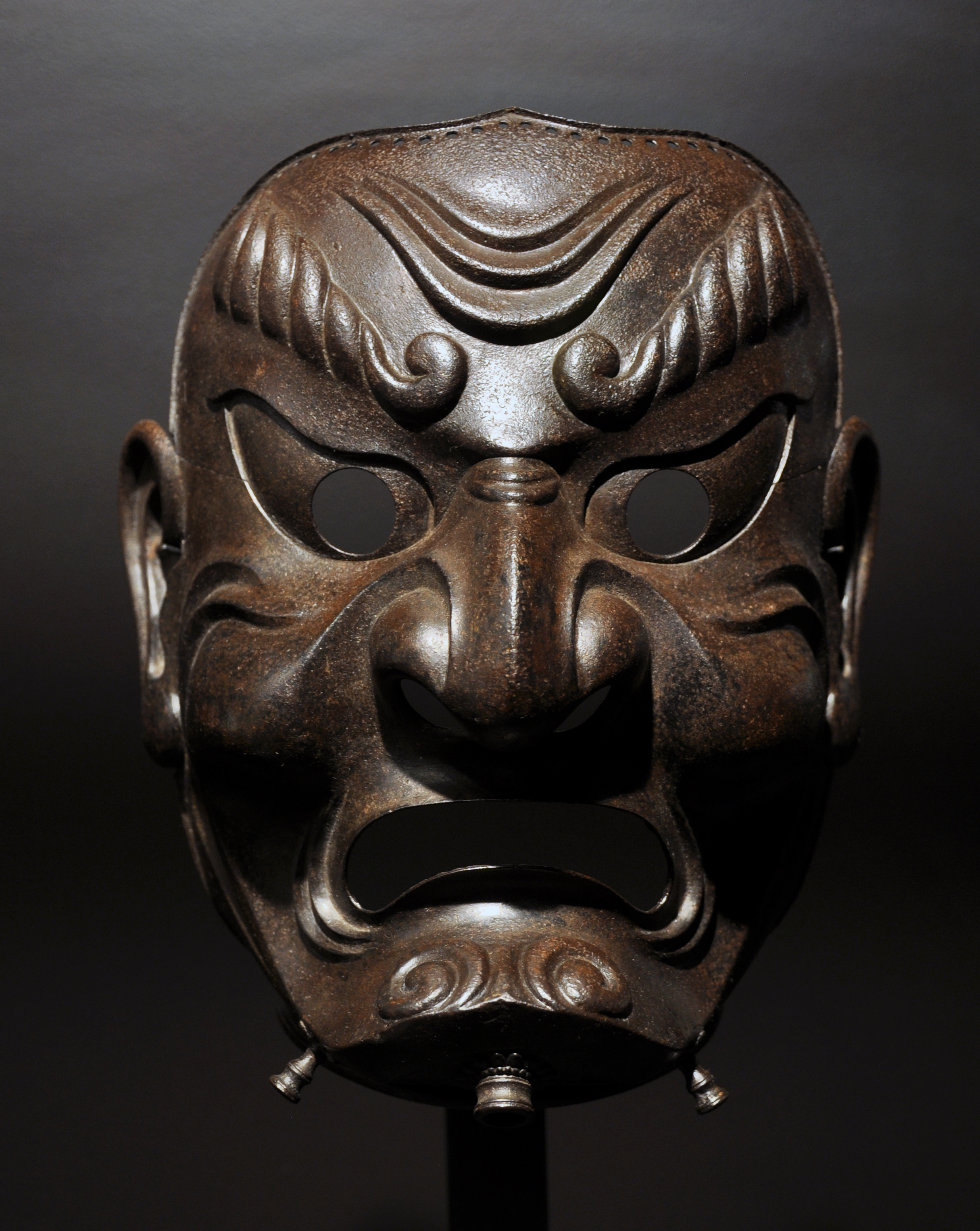

=== Menpō ===
Menpō covered the face from the nose down to the chin.

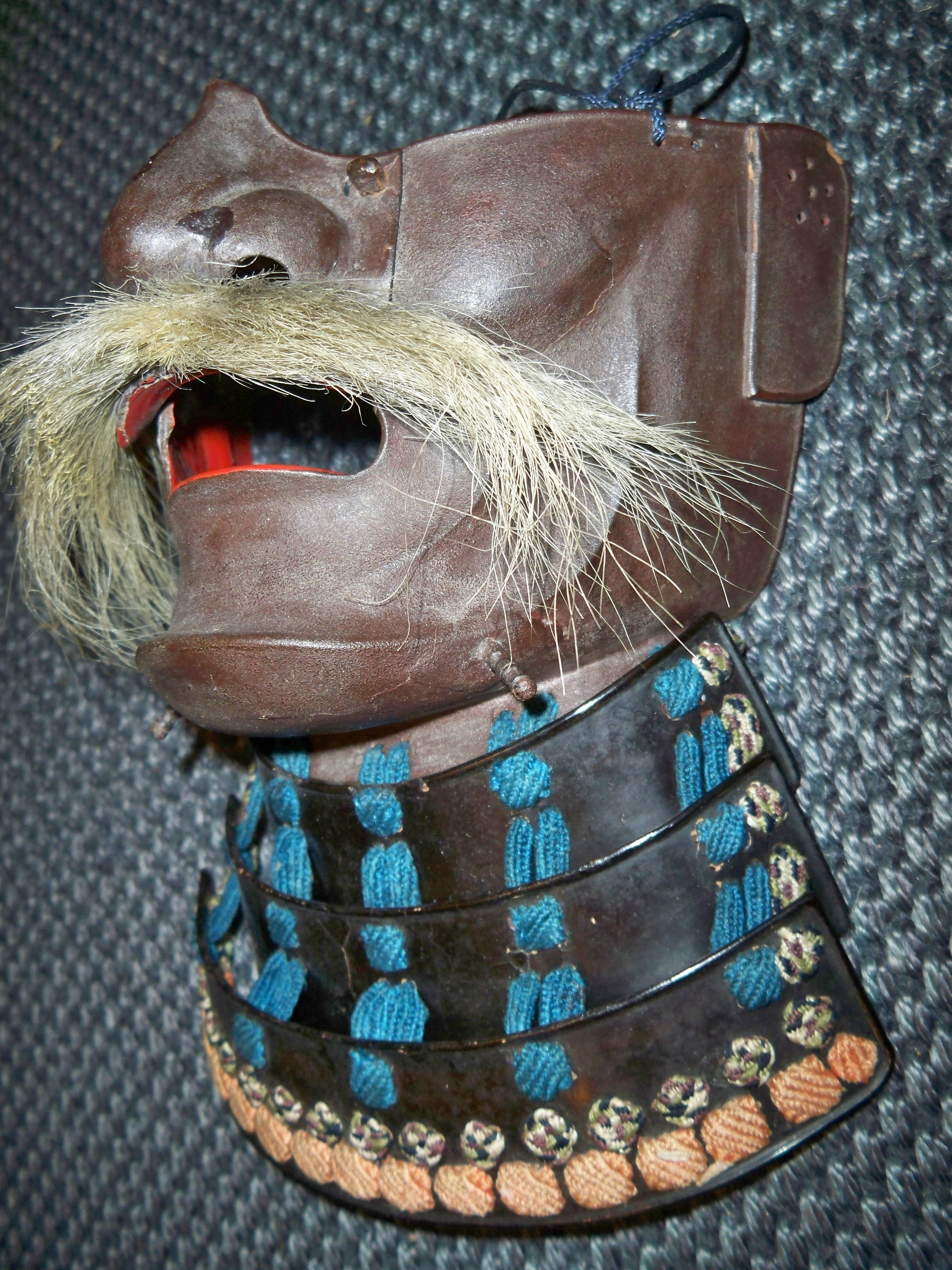

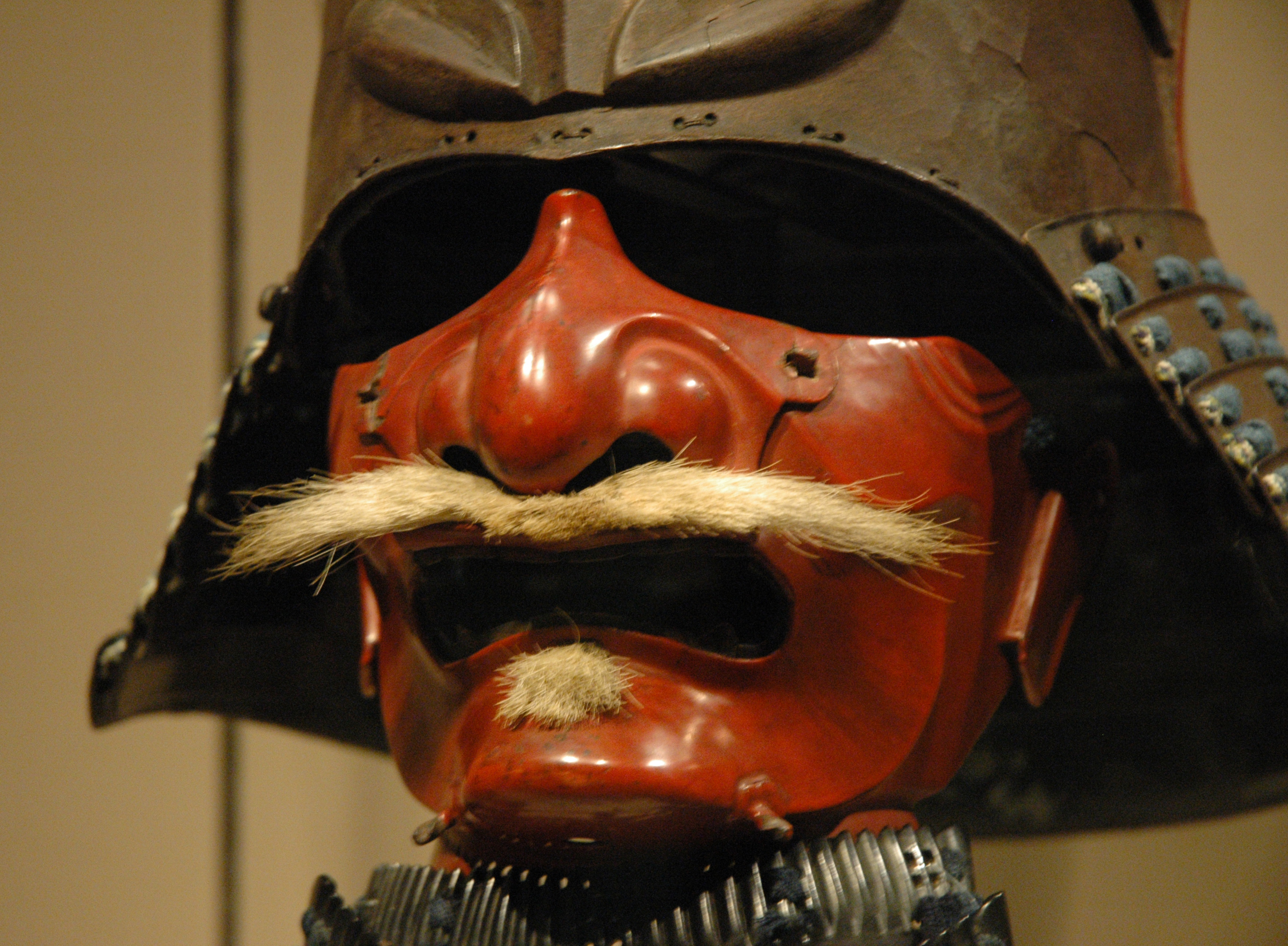

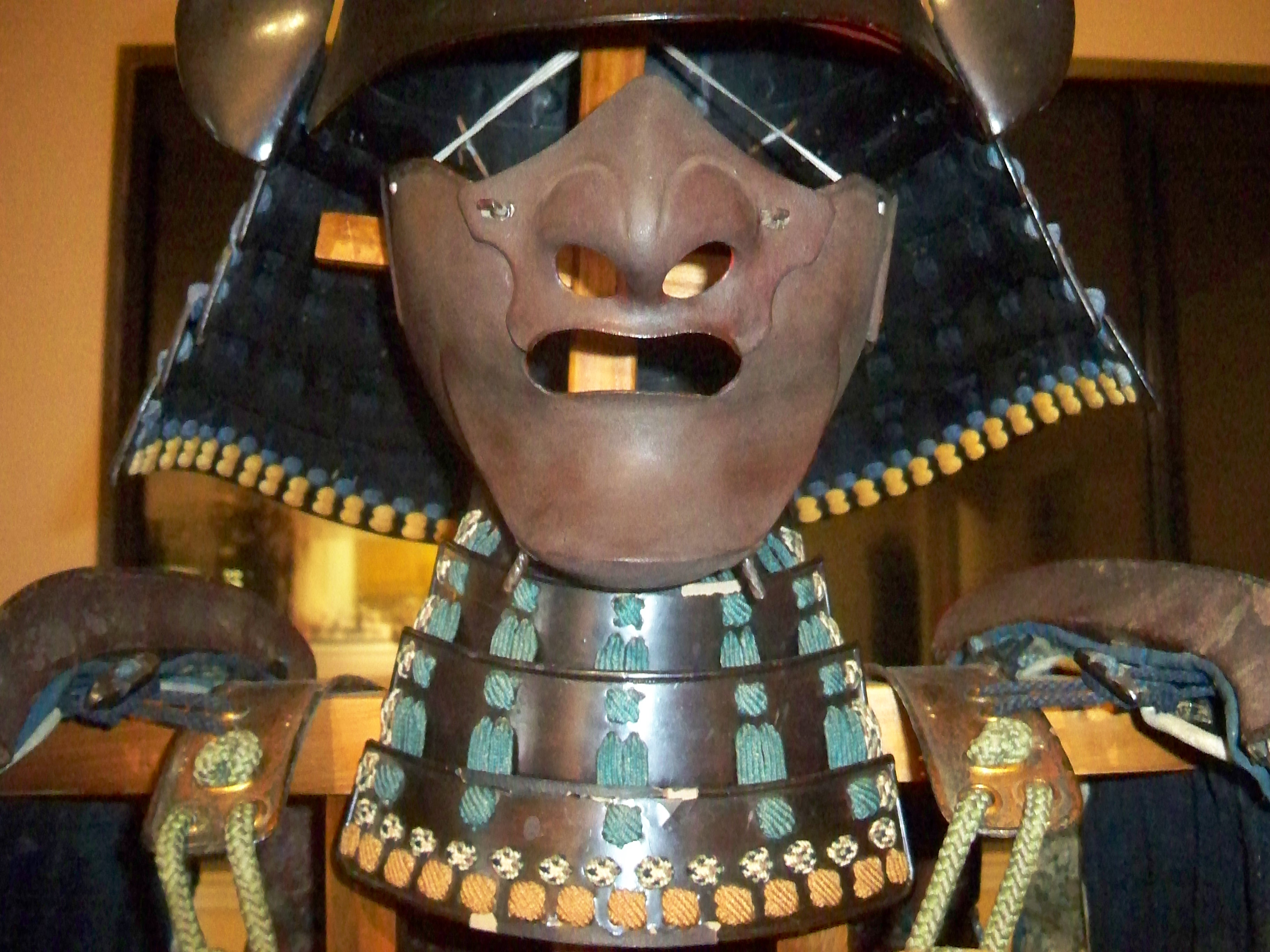

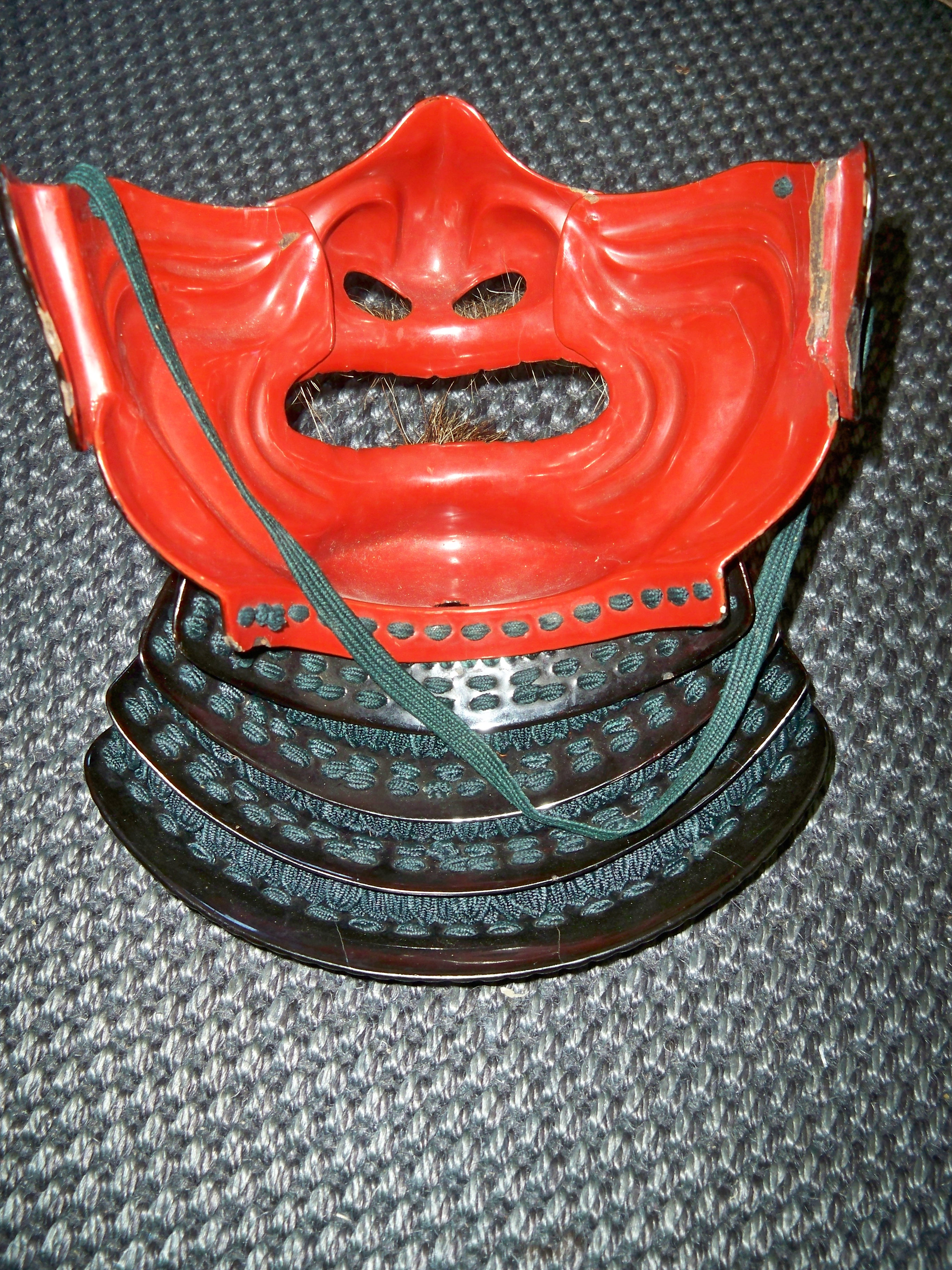

=== Hanbō (hanpō) ===
Hanbō covered the lower face from under the nose to the chin.

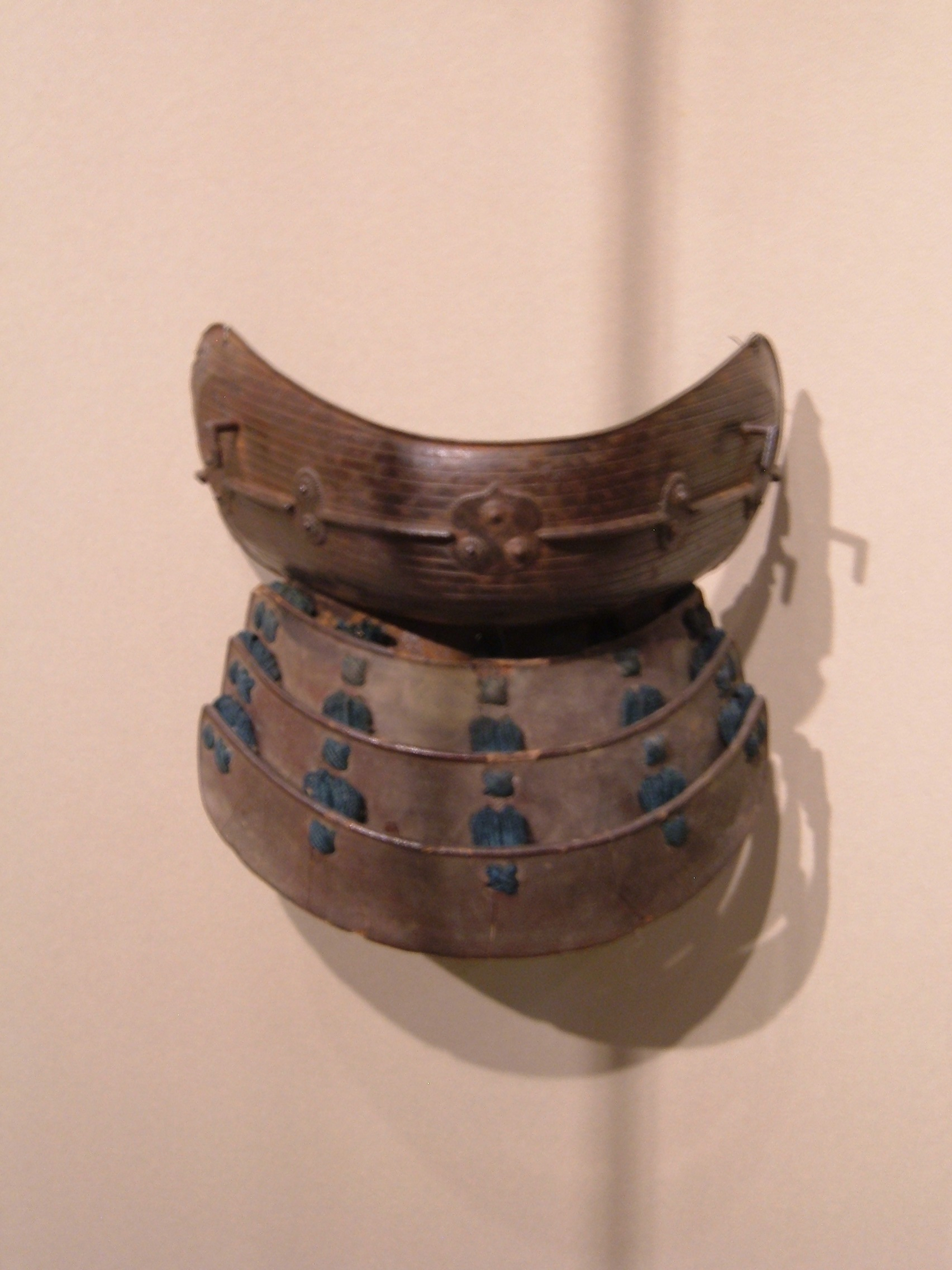

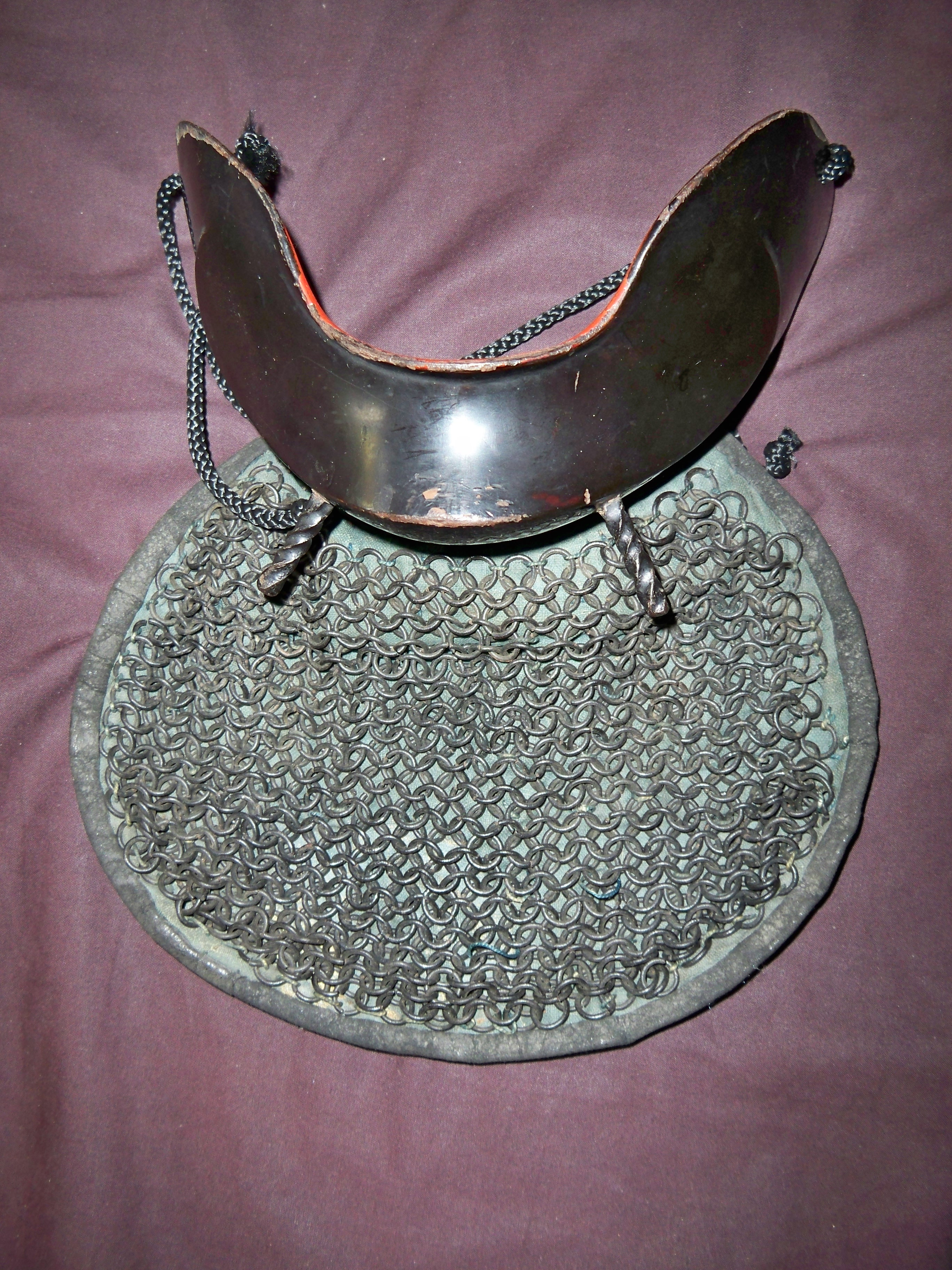

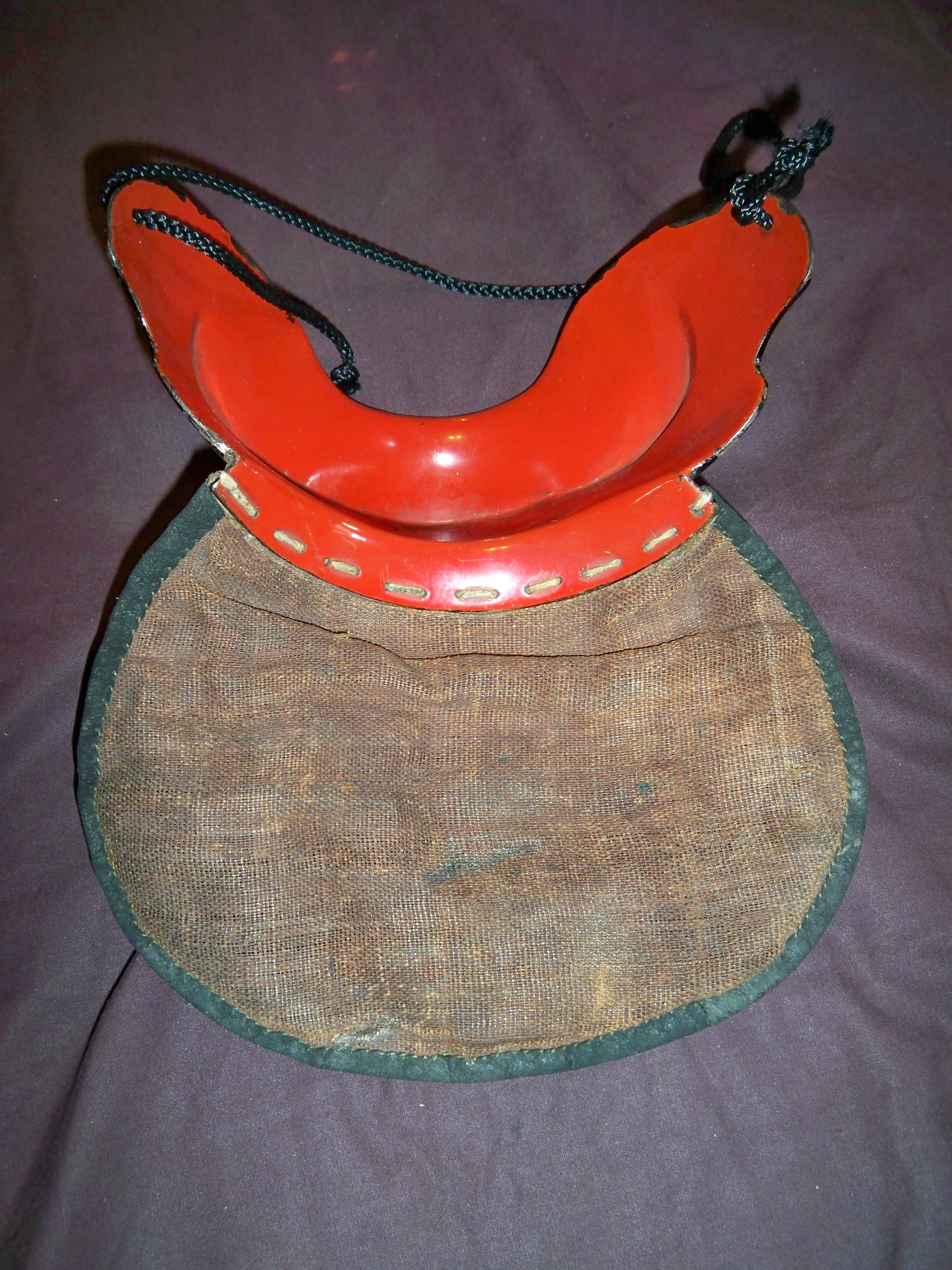

=== Happuri ===
Happuri covered the forehead and cheeks.

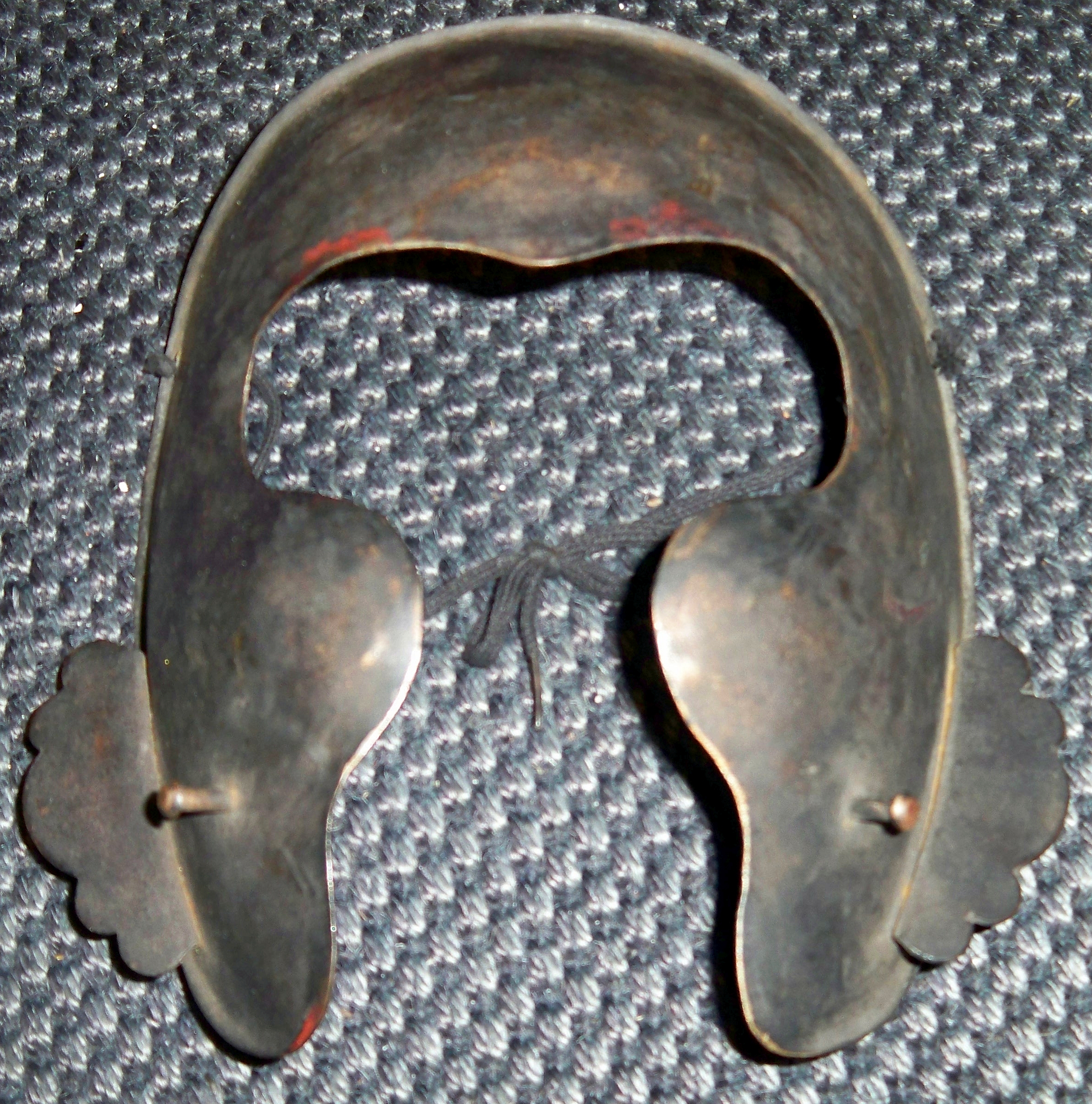

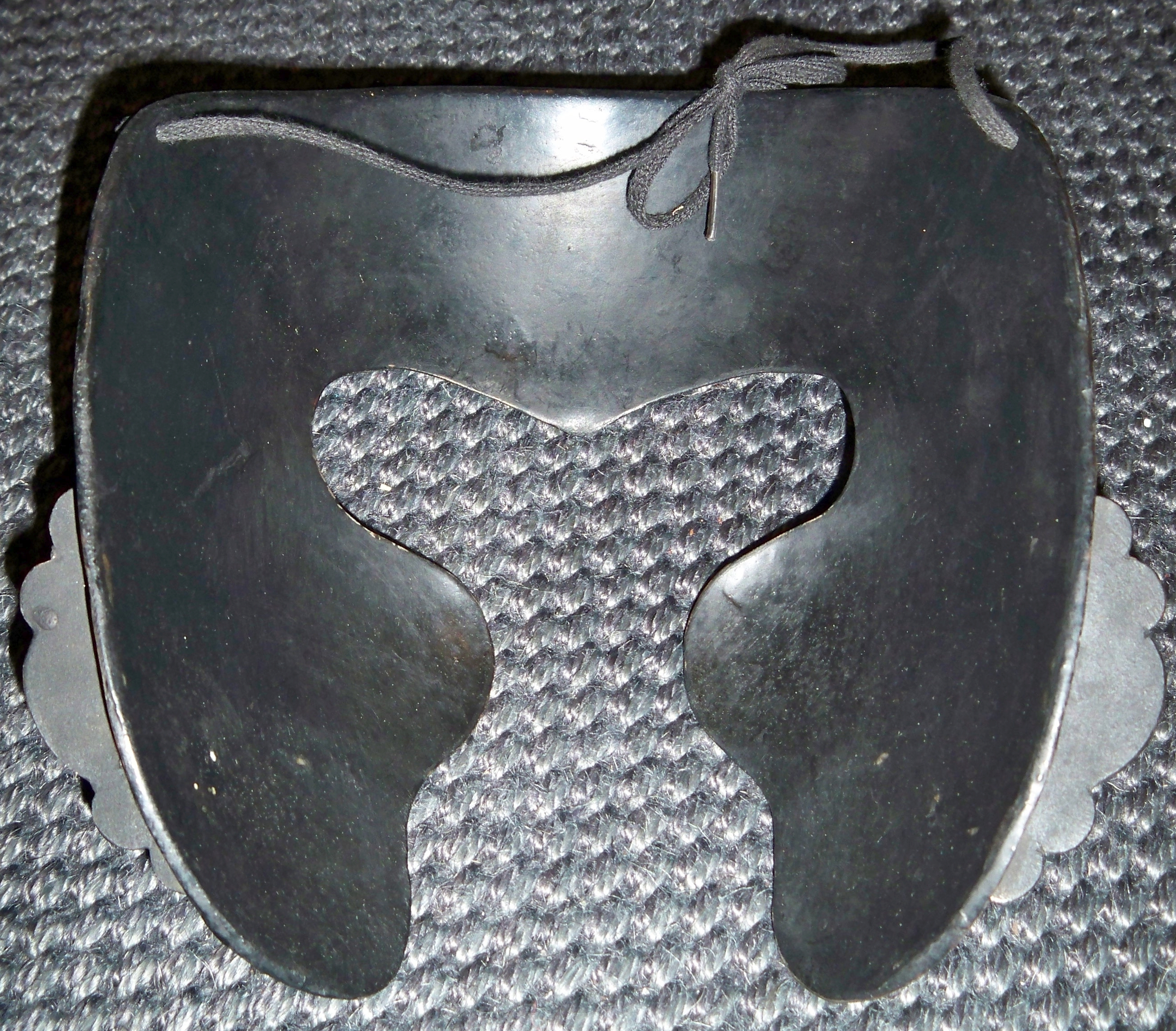

=== Parts of the men-yoroi ===
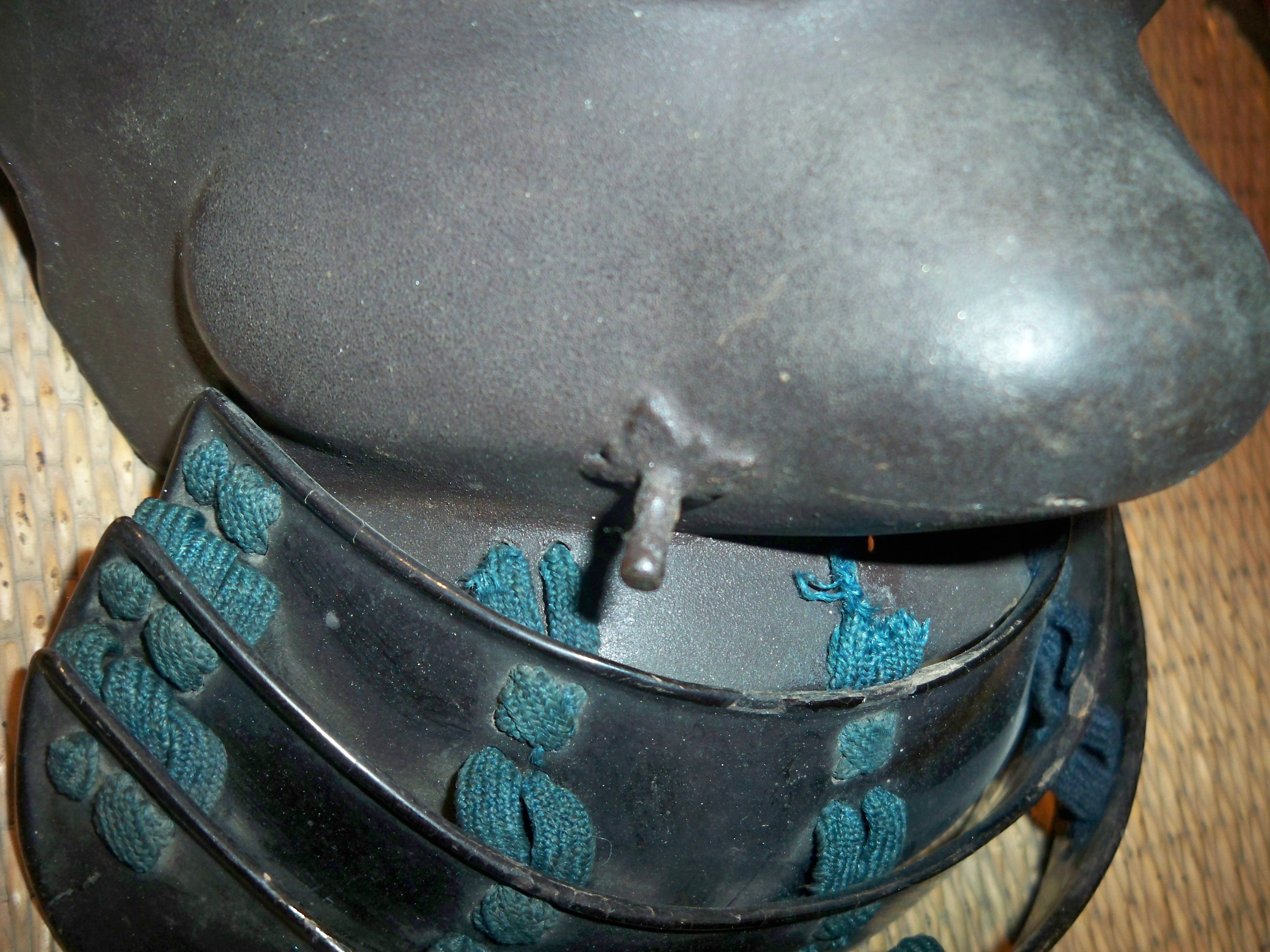
Odome, an attachment post for securing the chin strap of a kabuto (helmet)

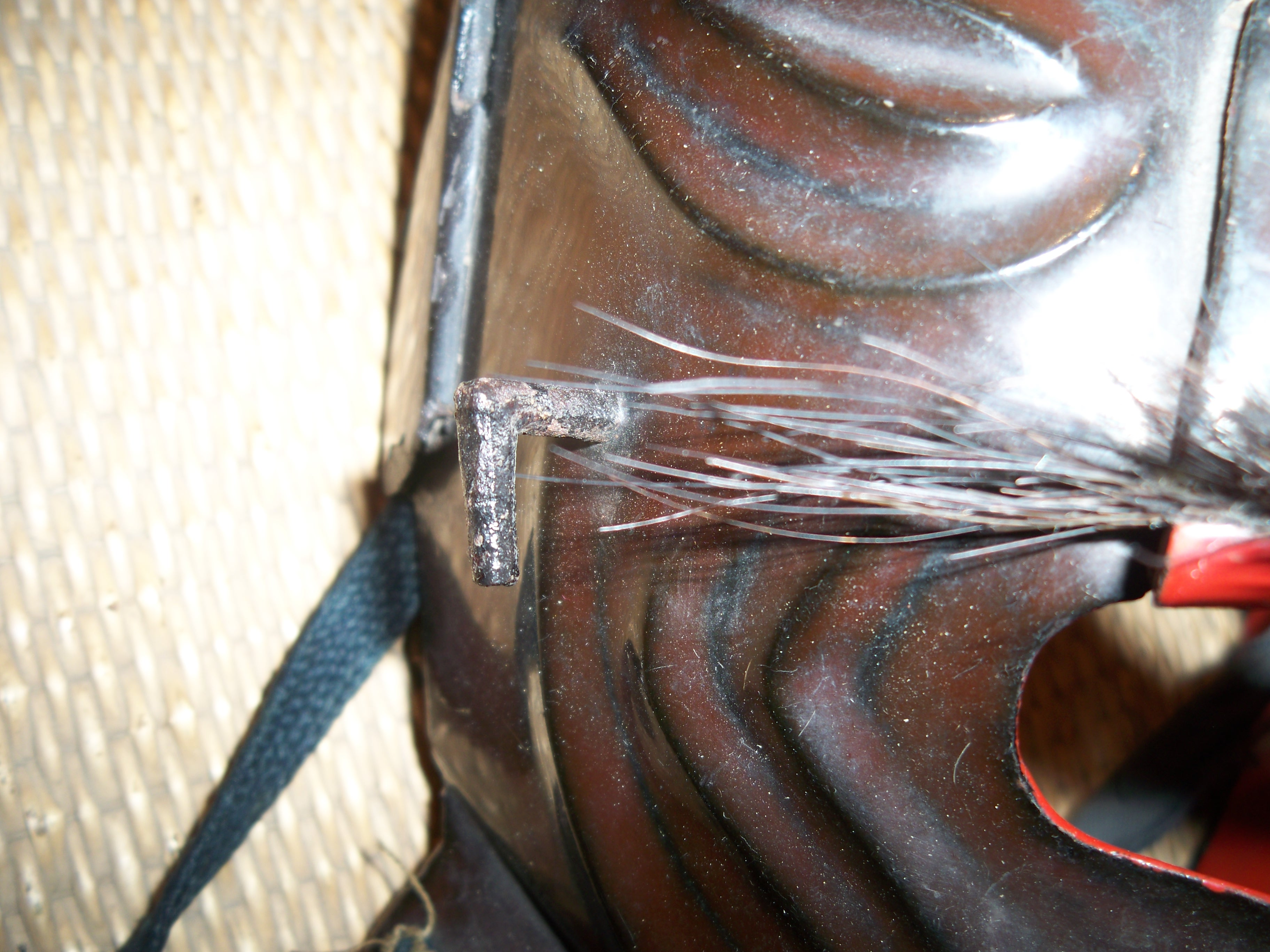
Ori-kugi, an attachment hook for securing the chin strap of a kabuto (helmet)

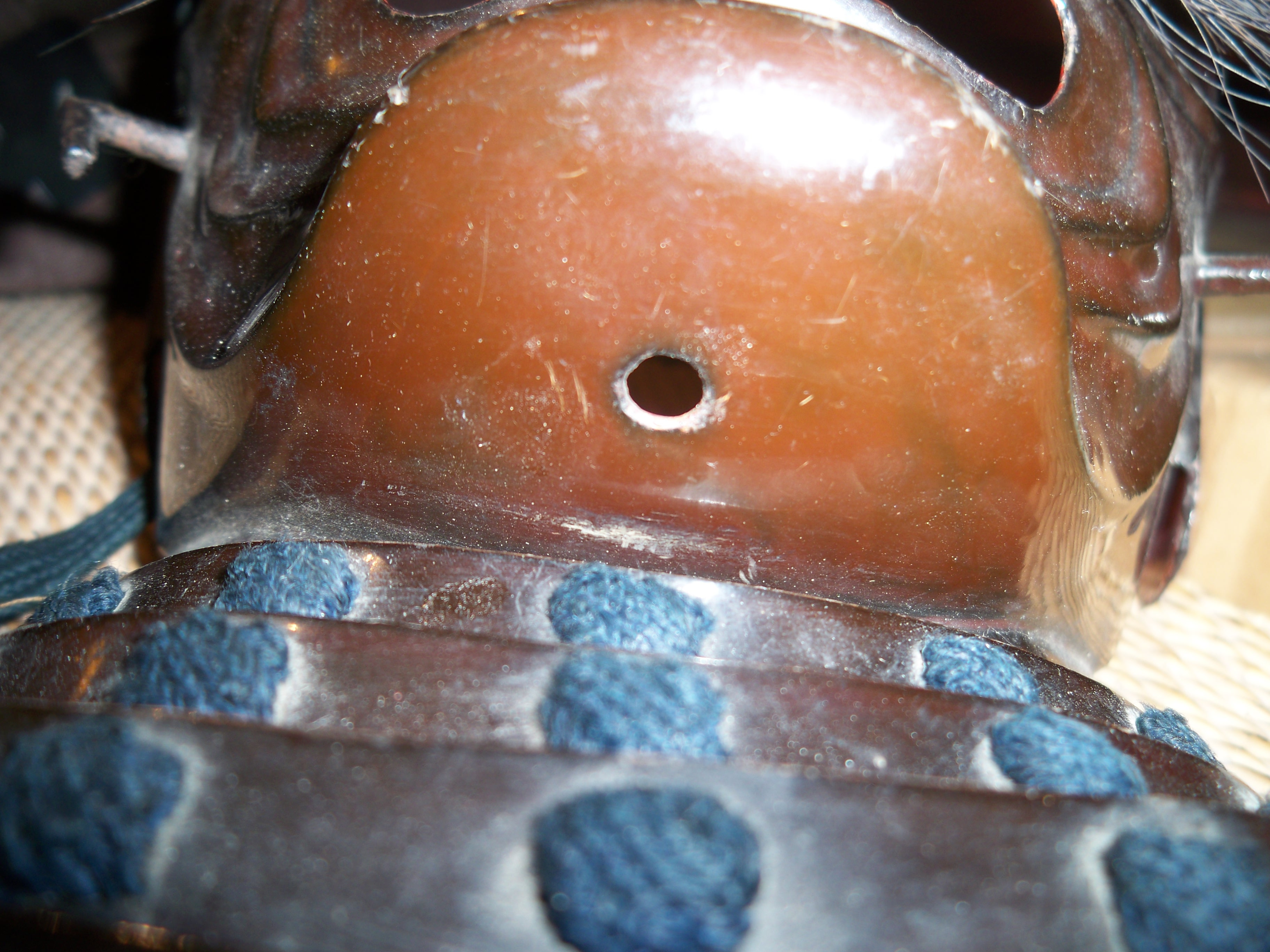
Ase nagashi no ana, a drain hole (or tube) for perspiration located under the chin of various mengu

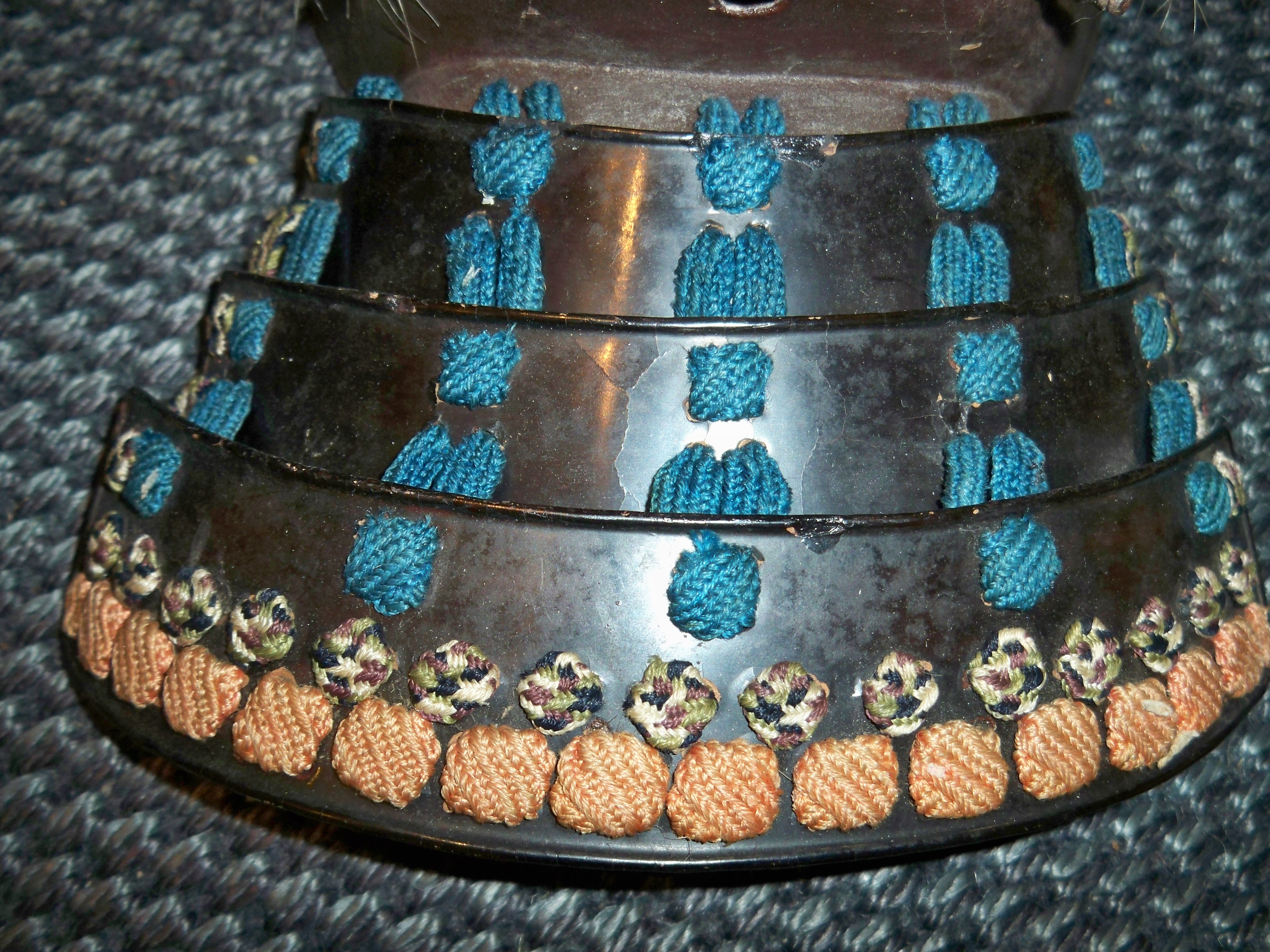
Yodare-kake, throat guard on various mengu

== See also ==
- Japanese armour
- Ō-yoroi

== Notes ==
1.See http://digital.princeton.edu/heijiscroll/ or Heiji monogatari.
