= Ō-yoroi =

Armor worn by the samurai class of feudal Japan

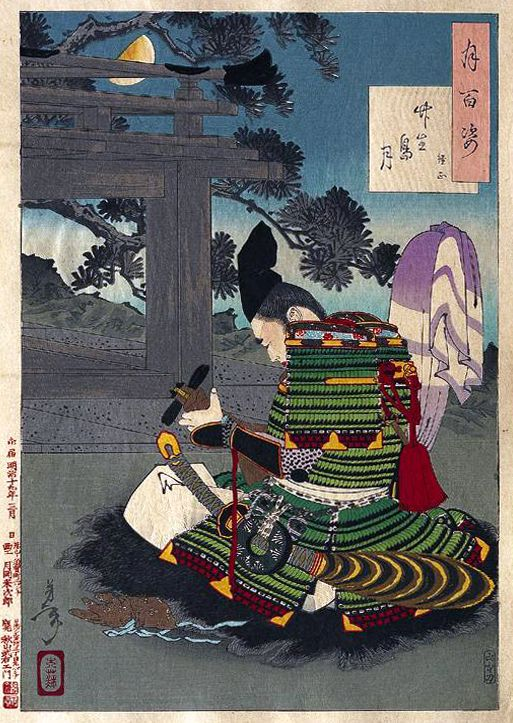
A samurai wearing an ō-yoroi; two of the large skirt-like kusazuri can be seen—Ō-Yoroi had four kusazuri, unlike other armour of the era, which usually had seven kusazuri.

The ō-yoroi (大鎧) is a prominent example of early Japanese armor worn by the samurai class of feudal Japan. The term ō-yoroi means "great armor".

== History ==
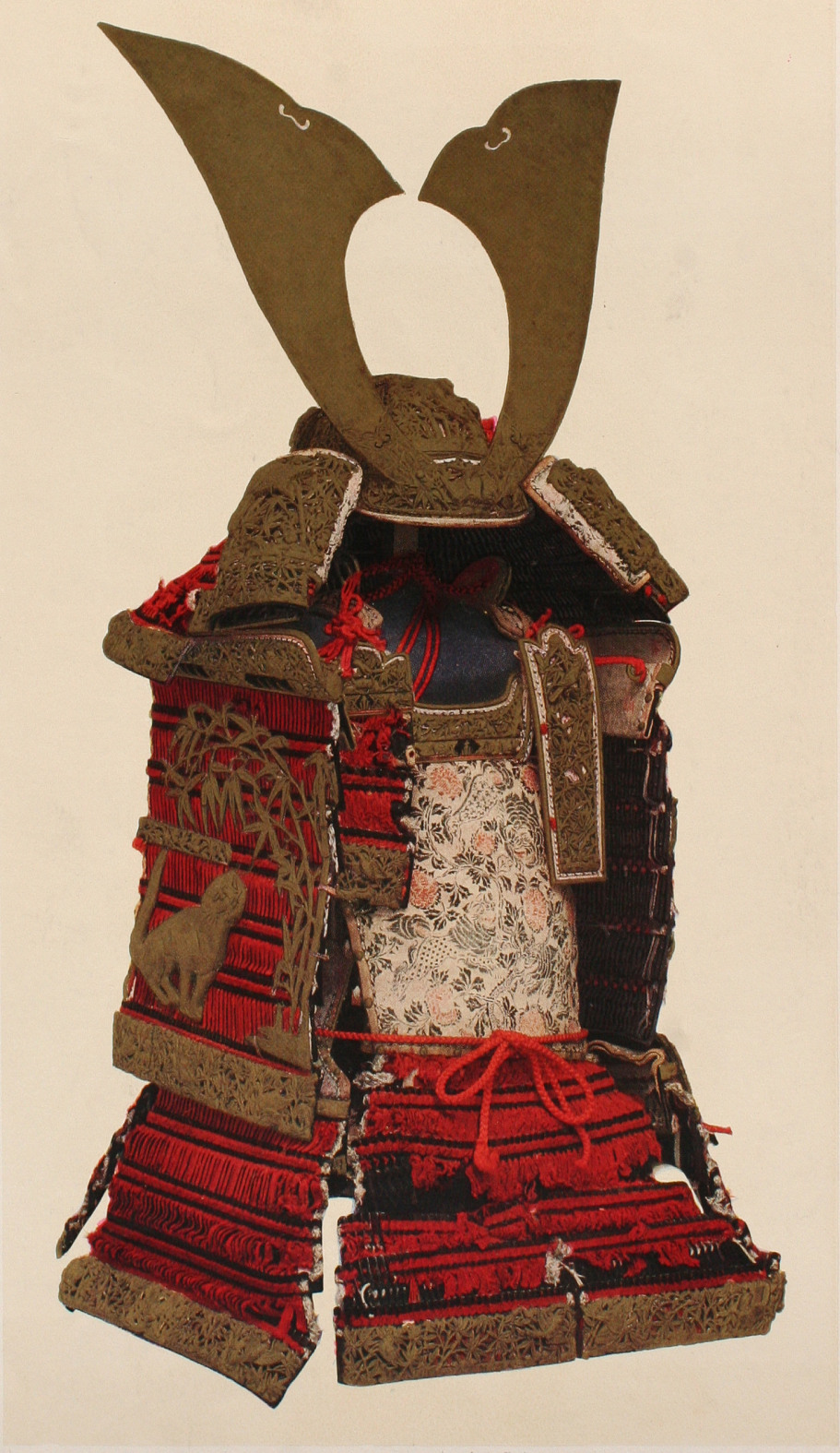
Ō-yoroi, Kamakura period, 13th–14th century, National Treasure, Kasuga grand shrine

Ō-yoroi first started to appear in the 10th century during the middle and late Heian period, and came into widespread use in the Genpei War around the 12th century when the call for armor was at its peak. Significant aspects of this armor were designed for cavalry archers. The box shaped ō-yoroi was heavy and did not allow as much movement or flexibility as its counterpart the dō-maru, so the armor fell out of favor in the fifteenth century when samurai shifted to mostly infantry tactics.

For the most part the ō-yoroi was a rich man's armor and not used by lower ranking samurai. The armor was mainly worn by the higher ranking samurai on horseback. The lower ranking soldiers had armor that was similar to the ō-yoroi, but had fewer components, was lighter, and lacked the decorative markings of the higher ranking samurai.

Most of the information known about the ō-yoroi is based on the armor of the higher-ranking officials since the armor was either donated to a shrine as an offering or maintained by the descendants of the original wearer. Many of the original components of the ō-yoroi still in existence have been replaced over time due to the items being lost or damaged. The few remaining examples of ō-yoroi are on display in museums (in several different countries) or in Shinto shrines where they have been maintained and protected for centuries.

== Components ==
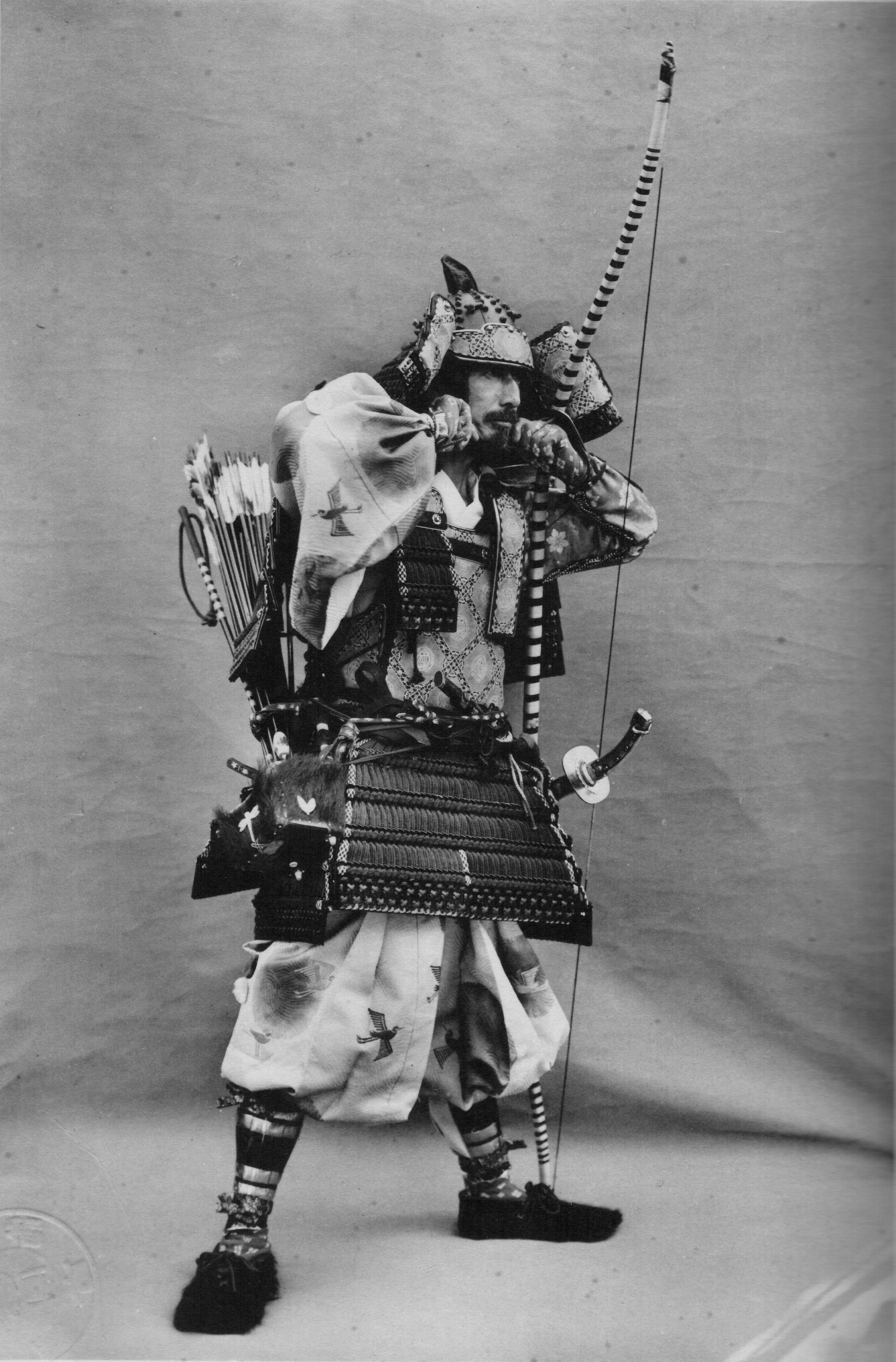
A man wearing a replica of the dark blue threaded Kon'ito-odoshi Ō-yoroi, 1935

The basic components of the ō-yoroi and other samurai armor are known collectively as the "hei-no-rokugu" or simply "rokugu," which means six articles of arms. The six major components are the dō (cuirass), kabuto (helmet), menpo (mask), kote (armoured sleeves), sune-ate (greaves), and the hai-date (cuisses). The ō-yoroi combines plate and scales (kozane) laced together (lamellar). One specific advance over earlier armors is that the kozane of ō-yoroi are first laced together and then covered with lacquer, which enhances resistance to corrosion. The dō of the ō-yoroi is unique from later models because it is composed of two separate parts instead of one piece with an opening on the side or back of the dō to allow the samurai to put on the armor.

The ō-yoroi (dō) consisted of two parts. One (the waidate) was a separate defense for the right side and the other part covered the rest of the wearer's trunk. The upper part of the waidate was solid iron plate covered with leather. The lower part was lamellar. When dressing for battle, the waidate was put on before the rest of the dō and fastened with cords that tied around the body. The rest of the dō was constructed with individual lacquered scales (kozane) laced together and covered with leather on top. The shoulder straps of the dō-yoroi, the watagami, were also unique from those on the dō-maru. The watagami were made of leather with attached metal plates. They were thicker and offered more protection than the straps on the dō-maru. The watagami of the dō-maru were eventually adopted because it was lighter and allowed more flexibility. A four piece box like skirt (kusazuri) of similar construction to the rest of the armor differentiated the ō-yoroi from the other armours of the era, the (dō-maru) and the (haramaki), which usually had seven panels of kusazuri.

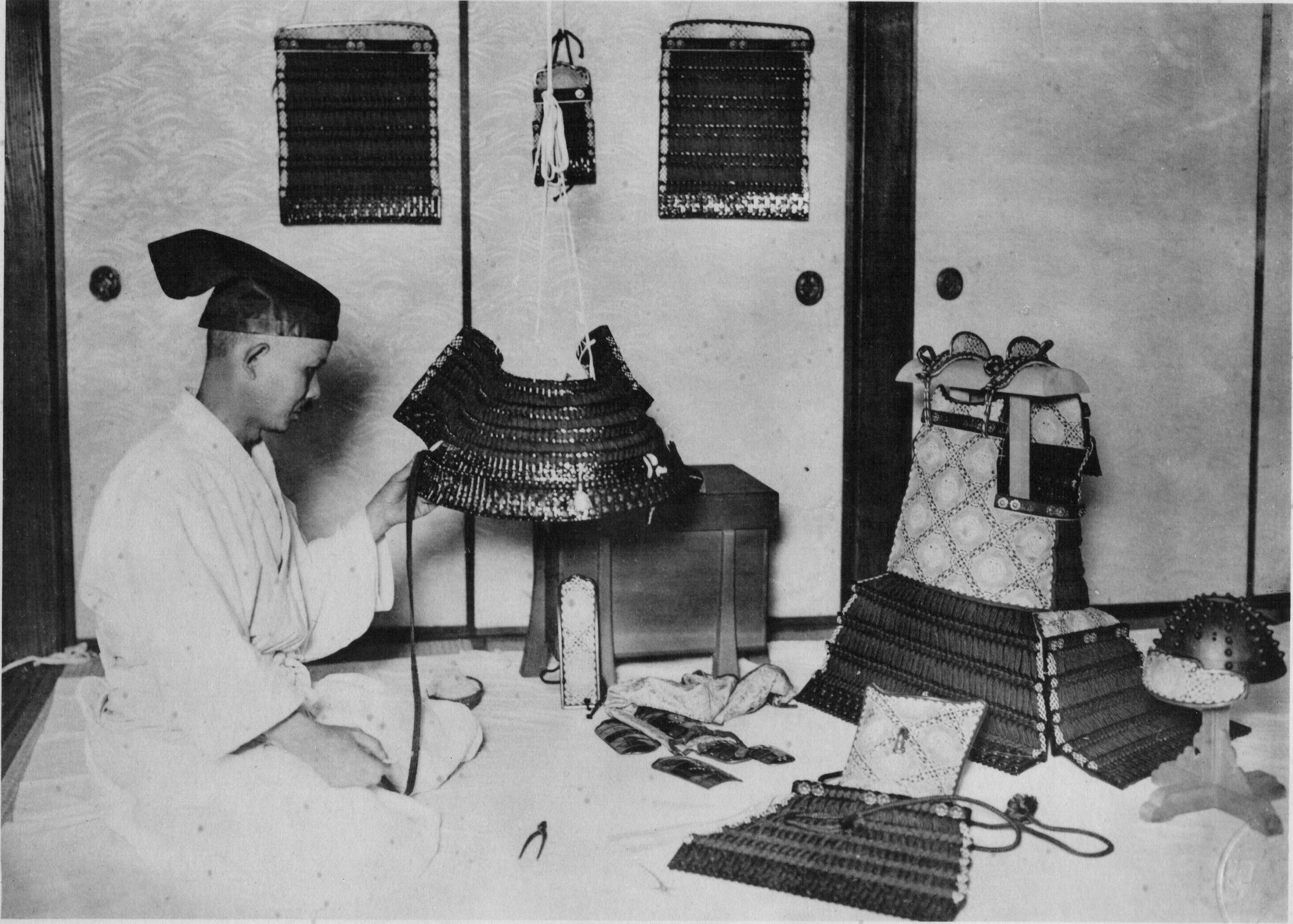
An armourer making a replica of Ō-yoroi, 1935

The kabuto (helmet) of the ō-yoroi is known as a hoshi-bachi-kabuto (star helmet), because of the protruding rivets. This type of helmet first appeared around the 10th century and was constructed with iron plates (tate hagi-no-ita) that are arranged vertically, and radiate from an opening in the top called the tehen or hachiman-za, the rivets that connect the plates have large protruding heads (o-boshi).

Facial armor called mengu was worn to protect the samurai's face as part of the full yoroi. It was composed of iron or lacquered leather. Mengu could cover the entire face or only sections of it. There were many different types and styles of mengu.

Ō-yoroi weighed around 30 kg or 65 pounds, and the metal of choice was iron. Due to the weight of iron, armour makers limited its use to cover the vitals, and substituted leather for the rest. One way to lower the weight was by alternating metal and leather kozane (scales) when constructing the rows of lamellar, creating a very strong armor with great flexibility and a more manageable weight. The ō-yoroi could take up to 265 days to make, using 2000 kozane in its construction. The time, materials and labor meant that an o-yoroi was a substantial investment for a samurai. It was big, boxy armor designed for use on horseback and was loose fitting. The boxy shape hindered the samurai from using the sword with the free, fluid motion vital in hand-to-hand combat, hence the use of yari.

== Lacing ==
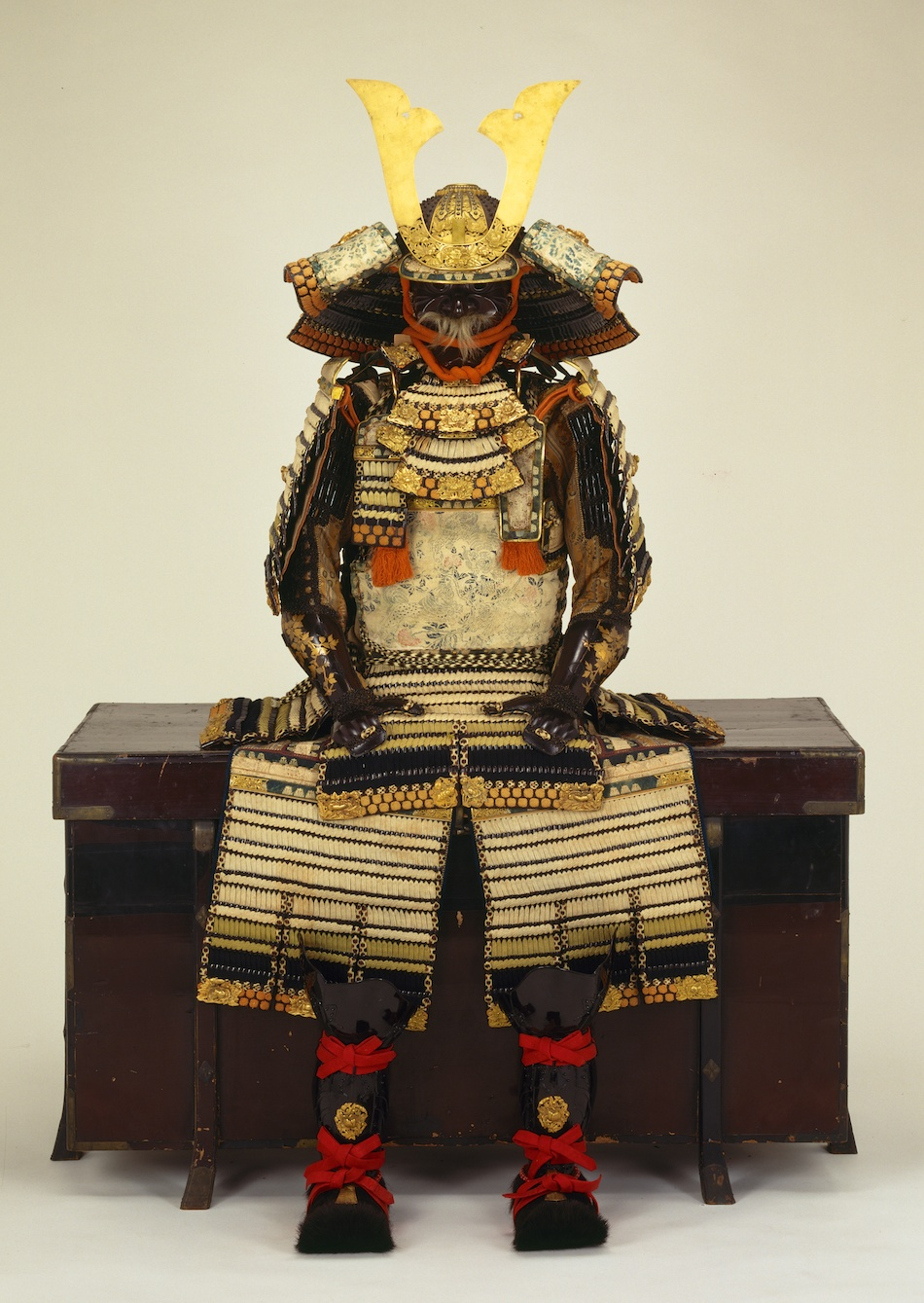
Ō-yoroi owned by Shimazu Nariakira. Edo period. Tokyo Fuji Art Museum

The color, design, and material of the lacing identified the clan of the warrior. The clans were also identified by the designs painted on the armor. Many of the clans used symbols as a crest, such as cherry blossoms or depictions of deities. The color and design of lacing the plates together, odoshi, was a system used for identification on the field. There were many different color combinations that identified warriors from a distance.

The design and coloring of the lacing also indicated rank. Higher-ranking officers had the plates of their armor laced together tightly, while lower ranking samurai had armor that was laced more loosely. The loosely laced armor was adopted for all ranks of samurai over time to decrease the weight, allow more flexibility, and help ventilate the armor. This allowed air to flow, keeping the samurai comfortable in hot and cool weather.

The loose lacing also allowed the armor to be cleaned and dried out, preventing the armor from rotting. It also reduced the weight of the armor by reducing the amount of water and ice retained on the lacing since it would be dried by the air flow. Once the loose lacing was adopted by all ranks, the lacing of the neck protector was then used to indicate rank.

The pattern and number of pairs in the lacing specifically indicated the rank of the wearer. Many of the remaining examples of the ō-yoroi have been re-laced to maintain the original form of the armor. However, some of the remaining ō-yoroi contain sections of the original lacing which impart valuable knowledge of the clan association.

== Gallery ==
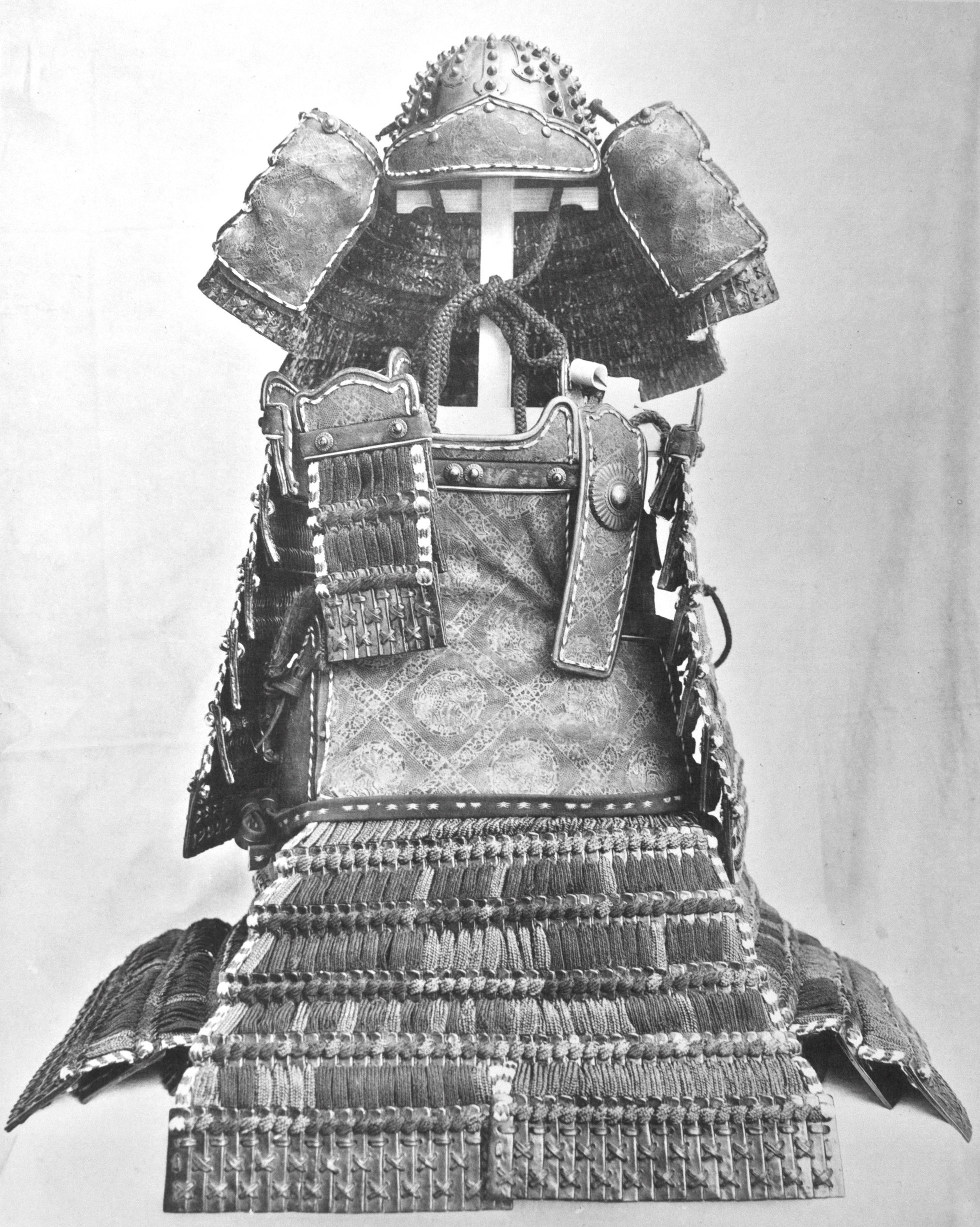
Ō-yoroi dedicated to Itsukushima Shrine. 12th century

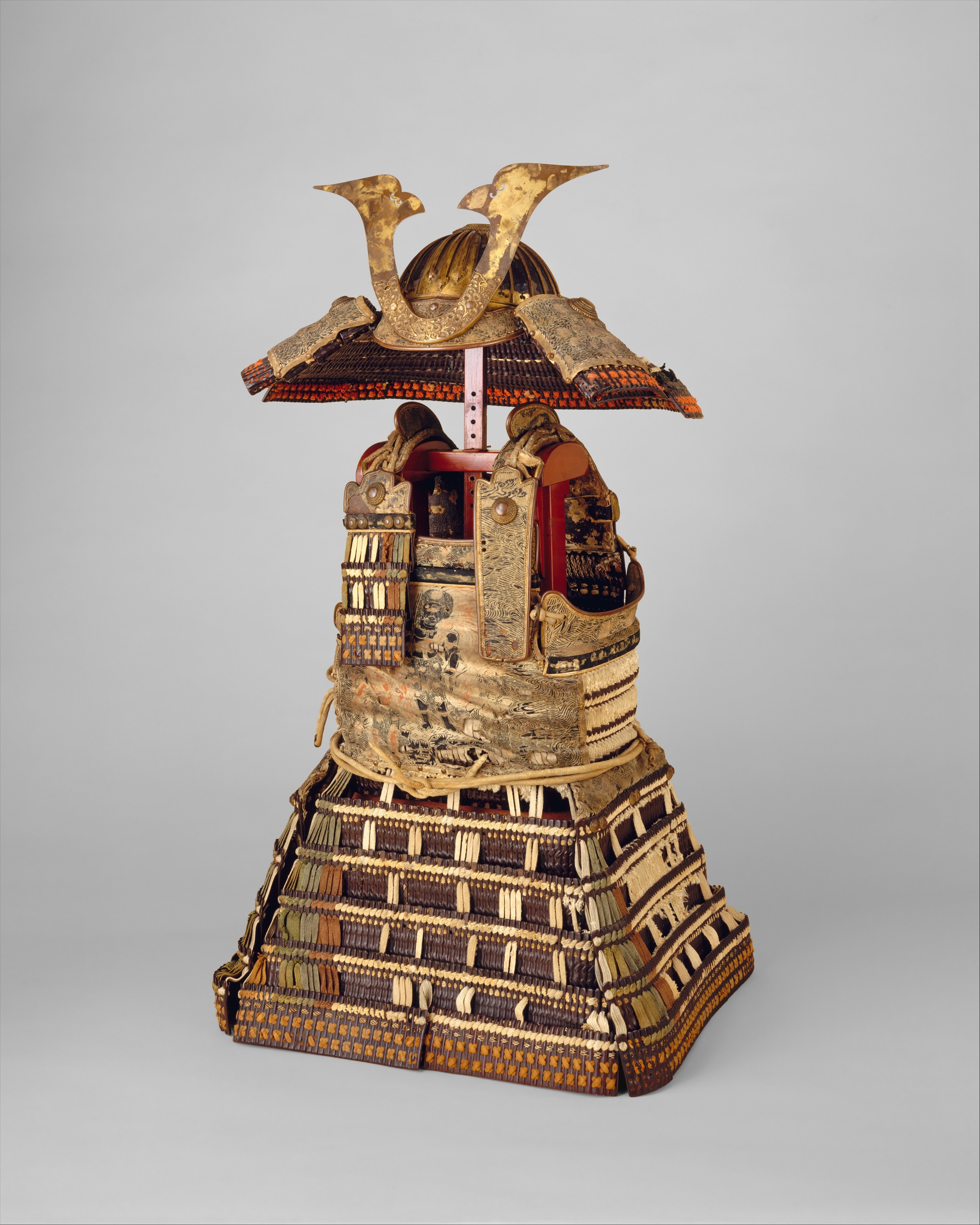
O-yoroi Armor of Ashikaga Takauji

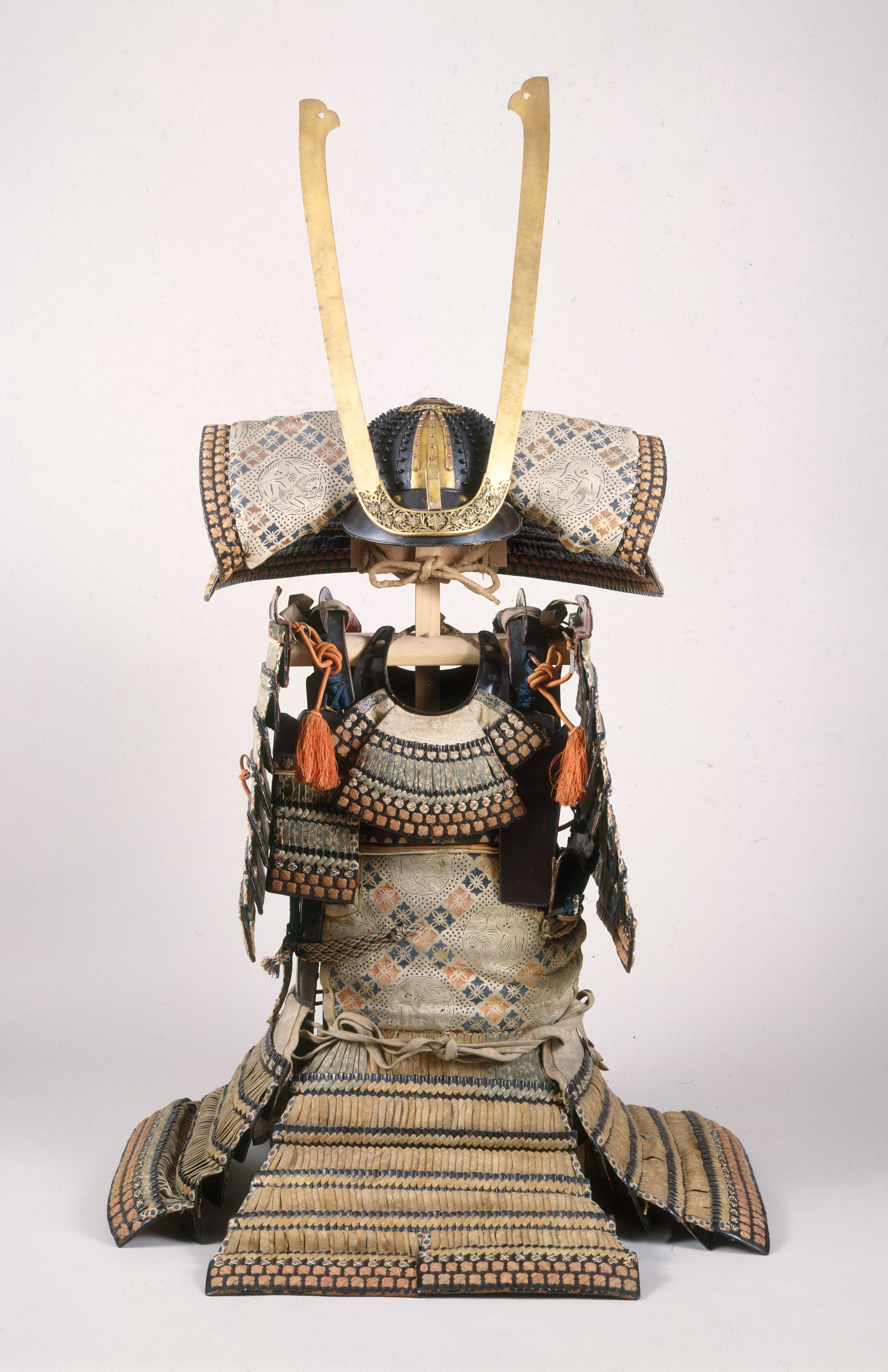
Yoroi donated to the Kurama Temple, near Kyoto, by one of the Ashikaga shoguns, early 14th–early 15th century

== See also ==
- List of National Treasures of Japan (crafts-others)
- Japanese armour
